= One Piece season 20 =

Season of television series

One Piece
- Season 20; Wano Country
- Cover for the first Japanese DVD compilation of the twentieth season as released by Avex Pictures
- No. of episodes: 197

Release
- Original network: Fuji Television
- Original release: July 7, 2019 – December 17, 2023

Season chronology
- ← Previous; Season 19 Next → Season 21

The twentieth season of the One Piece anime television series is produced by Toei Animation and directed by Tatsuya Nagamine, Satoshi Itō and Yasunori Koyama. The season was broadcast in Japan on Fuji Television from July 7, 2019, to December 17, 2023. On April 19, 2020, Toei Animation announced that the series would be delayed due to the ongoing COVID-19 pandemic. They later scheduled the series' return for June 28, 2020, resuming from episode 930. On March 10, 2022, it was announced that the series would be delayed until further notice due to a security breach in Toei Animation's network on March 6, 2022. On April 5, 2022, it was announced that the series would return on April 17, 2022, with the airing of episode 1014.

Like the rest of the series, this season follows the adventures of Monkey D. Luffy and his Straw Hat Pirates. The main story arc, called "Wano Country", adapts material from the rest of the 90th volume to the beginning of the 105th volume of the manga by Eiichiro Oda. It deals with the alliance between the pirates, samurai, minks and ninja to liberate Wano Country from the corrupt shogun Kurozumi Orochi, who has allied with the Beast Pirates led by one of the Four Emperors, Kaido. Episodes 895 and 896 contain an original story arc, "Cidre Guild" which ties into the film One Piece: Stampede. Episode 907 is an adaptation of Oda's one-shot manga Romance Dawn, which features "the story of a Luffy slightly different from the one in One Piece". Episodes 1029 and 1030 constitute a One Piece Film: Red tie-in making up the "Uta's Past" arc, taking place over a decade before the present and following Luffy's childhood interactions with Uta, the adoptive daughter of "Red-Haired" Shanks. At 197 episodes, season 20 is the first-ever longest season of the series.

Seven pieces of theme music are used for this season. From episodes 892 to 934, the first opening theme is "Over the Top", performed by Hiroshi Kitadani. From episodes 935 to 999 and 1001 to 1004, the second opening theme is "Dreamin' On", performed by Da-ice. For episode 1000, the special opening theme is "We Are!", performed by Hiroshi Kitadani. From episodes 1005–1027 and 1031–1073, the fourth opening theme is "Paint", performed by I Don't Like Mondays. From episodes 1028–1030 and recap special 4 (1030.5), in the Japanese broadcast only due to licensing reasons and as to promote One Piece Film: Red, the special opening theme is the theme song of the aforementioned film, "New Genesis" (新時代, Shin Jidai; lit. 'New Age'), performed by Ado, the vocalist of the character from the aforementioned film, Uta. From episodes 1074 to 1088, the fifth opening theme is "The Peak" (最高到達点, Saikō Tōtatsuten) by Sekai no Owari. From episodes 1071 to 1088, the first ending theme is "Raise" by Chili Beans, which marked the first ending theme for the series in 17 years.

== Episodes ==
No. overall (Note: Episode number by Toei Animation's count)	No. in season	Title (Note: Title of the episode: literally translated, romanized using Hepburn romanization, and in kanji form)	Directed by	Written by	Animation directed by	Original release date (Note: Date the episode originally aired on Fuji Television)
Wano Country
892	1	"The Land of Wano! To the Samurai Country where Cherry Blossoms Flutter!"; Transliteration: "Wano Kuni! Sakuramau Samurai no Kuni e" (Japanese: ワノ国！桜舞うサムライの国へ)	Tatsuya Nagamine	Shōji Yonemura	Midori Matsuda	July 7, 2019
Zoro, Usopp, Franky, and Robin are incognito inside Wano Country. Zoro poses as a ronin, Usopp works as a toad oil merchant, Franky works as a carpenter, and Robin trains as a geisha. One night, Zoro is arrested for street murders. Zoro plans to defend himself, but remembers how Kin'emon told them not to cause trouble, as any acts against Wano's corrupt shogun, Kurozumi Orochi, or his men will be heard about by Kaido, who's backing them. On the next day, he is sentenced to commit seppuku. Deducing that the magistrate is the culprit, Zoro using the small seppuku knife cuts down the magistrate and his house from a distance, before combating his men. Elsewhere, Luffy and the Thousand Sunny washed up on a beach, before two large beasts catch his attention.
893	2	"Otama Appears! Luffy vs. Kaido's Army!"; Transliteration: "Otama Tōjō – Rufi tai Kaidō-gun!" (Japanese: お玉登場 ルフィVSカイドウ軍！)	Kōhei Kureta	Atsuhiro Tomioka	Shūichi Itō	July 14, 2019
While fighting the magistrate's men, Zoro retrieves his swords and demolishes the magistrate's home. Afterwards, Zoro becomes a wanted man. Back at Kuri Beach, Komachiyo, a large Komainu and a giant sword-wielding baboon, are fighting near the Thousand Sunny. Luffy then remembers that when the Sunny was entering the whirlpool, he helped the others get away, but the octopus that snuck onto the ship grabbed him and dragged him into the water. Two Beast Pirates then arrive with a captive girl and try to capture Luffy. He easily defeats them and frees the girl, who introduces herself as O-Tama. After Tama tames Hihimaru by feeding him a Kibi Dango that she pulls from her cheek, Luffy gets acquainted with her.
894	3	"He'll Come! The Legend of Ace in the Land of Wano!"; Transliteration: "Kanarazu kuru – Wano Kuni no Ēsu Densetsu!" (Japanese: 必ず来る ワノ国のエース伝説！)	Aya Komaki	Hitoshi Tanaka	Yusuke Isouchi & Yukiko Nakatani	July 21, 2019
After securing the Sunny, Tama, along with Komachijo and the baboon, who Tama names Hihimaru, takes Luffy to the house where she lives with her master, while telling Luffy her dream of becoming a "bewitching" ninja. After feeding Luffy all the rice she had as thanks, Tama walks away for a moment when her stomach starts growling. Tama's master, a swordsmith who dresses as a tengu, Tenguyama Hitetsu, arrives and attacks Luffy, telling him of how Tama can barely get by and that the rice he ate was supposed to be Tama's eighth-birthday dinner. Tama begs Hitestsu to stop, before collapsing due to drinking river water that's highly polluted due to runoff from Kaido's factories to sate her hunger. Despite the land being desolate, the two still live there waiting for the return of the pirate, Portgas D. Ace. Luffy reveals to them that unfortunately they waited in vain since Ace died. Refusing to believe Ace is dead, Tama accuses Luffy of lying before fainting. Hitetsu explains a year ago, X Drake, working under Kaido, ransacked their village and how the capital is the only place in Wano that is not desolate land. He also explains that four years ago, Ace, from before he joined Whitebeard's crew, wrecked on the island and helped them during a famine, having grown particularly close with Tama. Meanwhile, Basil Hawkins, now a subordinate of Kaido, goes to investigate the soldiers defeated by Luffy.
Cidre Guild
895	4	"Side Story! The World's Greatest Bounty Hunter, Cidre!"; Transliteration: "Tokubetsu-hen! Saikyō no Shōkin Kari Shīdoru" (Japanese: 特別編！最強の賞金狩りシードル)	Yutaka Nakashima	Atsuhiro Tomioka	Masahiro Kitazaki	July 28, 2019
A bounty hunter group who uses carbonated water-based weapons called the Cidre Guild unsuccessfully attempt to capture the Straw Hats, leaving the Thousand Sunny without any cola fuel. Luffy visits a nearby island in search of cola and is directed to a factory run by the Cidre Guild but is attacked on the way by Cidre Guild members run by Ginger, leader of the guild's firearms squad, who uses a pair of soda-firing bazookas. Luffy is knocked into a stream and washes up in a pool where Hancock is bathing. Luffy and members of the Kuja Pirates defeat everyone except Ginger, who escapes using a CO2 attack which separates the Kujas from Luffy and Hancock. As Hancock asks Luffy to attend the Pirates Fest with her, they are attacked by Cidre, the Cidre Guild's commander.
896	5	"Side Story! Clash! Luffy vs. the King of Carbonation!"; Transliteration: "Tokubetsu-hen! Kessen! Rufi tai Tansan-ō" (Japanese: 特別編！決戦！ルフィVS炭酸王)	Yutaka Nakashima	Atsuhiro Tomioka	Shigefumi Shingaki	August 4, 2019
As Luffy fights Cidre as Hancock fights Guarna, who uses a pair of pressurized carbonated hoses as swords. meanwhile, the rest of the Straw Hats discovers that the Cidre Guild soldiers are local men who Cidre forced to fight for him. When Giger and Hancock's sisters arrive, the Cidre Guild fall back, with Luffy and the others following. Cidre equips his most powerful carbonated rig to battle Luffy, and he discovers that the Cidre Guild soldiers are local men who Cidre coerced by taking their families hostage. Hancock defeats both Ginger and Guarana, turning them to stone. Luffy is able to defeat Cidre with a Gum-Gum Elephant Gun, and Hancock revives the Guild's slaves she had turned to stone. Afterwards, Luffy finds an invitation to the Pirate Fest, and the freed Cidre Guild members gift the Straw Hats several barrels of cola. The Straw Hats sail to Delta Island for the Pirate Fest, with a planned race for Gol D. Roger's treasure in particular exciting Luffy. Other Supernovas make their way as, elsewhere, Buena Festa looks forward to a clash between Luffy and Douglas Bullet, leading to the events in One Piece: Stampede.
Wano Country
897	6	"Save Otama! Straw Hat, Bounding through the Wasteland!"; Transliteration: "O-Tama Sukue – Mugiwara Kōya o Kakeru!" (Japanese: お玉救え 麦わら荒野を駆ける！)	Satoshi Itō	Tomohiro Nakayama	Kimitaka Itō & Eisaku Inoue	August 11, 2019
After Luffy dons a kimono and takes the famed blade, Nidai Kitetsu, he and Komachiyo leave Hitetsu to take Tama to a doctor. Along the way Tama wakes up, but still refuses to believe that Ace is dead, recalling how he promised to let her join his crew if she became a "bewitching" ninja upon his return. As they leave the forest, Luffy is shocked to see how truly desolate the wasteland is. Tama explains that all of the animals living there have become poisonous due drinking from the polluted water and that any clean food and water is controlled by the shogun and Kaido. Meanwhile, Zoro saves a woman from two Beast Pirates. Soon after this, Luffy reunites with Zoro. However, they are soon confronted by Hawkins, now a Headliner for the Beast Pirates.
898	7	"The Headliner! Hawkins the Magician Appears!"; Transliteration: "Shin'uchi! Majutsu-shi Hōkinsu Tōjō" (Japanese: 真打ち! 魔術師ホーキンス登場)	Yasunori Koyama	Shinzō Fujita	Masahiro Shimanuki	August 18, 2019
Zoro takes an interest in Nidai Kitetsu, but Luffy refuses to let him see it before engaging in a fight against Hawkins' men, though Zoro becomes irritated by Luffy's improper use of a sword. Hawkins eventually steps in and displays his Straw-Straw Fruit powers to them, such wielding a deadly sword of straw and being able to make voodoo dolls that redirect any damage he receives to his subordinates before creating a giant scarecrow-like monster whose actions are governed by tarot cards to attack them. Komachiyo grabs Luffy and Zoro and runs from the battle, as Tama's condition worsens, but Hawkins pursues them.
899	8	"Defeat is Inevitable! The Strawman's Fierce Attack!"; Transliteration: "Haiboku Kakutei – Sutorō Man no Mōkō!" (Japanese: 敗北確定 ストローマンの猛攻！)	Yusuke Suzuki	Akiko Inoue	Toshio Deguchi	August 25, 2019
As Komachiyo flees with Luffy, Zoro, and the ill Tama, Hawkins pursues them with the straw entity. Zoro defends against the straw entity's attacks and eventually defeats it. After the group escapes from Hawkins, the woman Zoro saved, Otsuru, who had been hiding inside Komachiyo's tail, reveals herself and invites the group to her teahouse in Okobore Town, where she can help Tama. In Okobore Town, the yokozuna Urashima tries to court the teahouse's waitress, O-Kiku, into marrying him, but she declines. Luffy's groups arrive and Otsuru orders Kiku to brew a tea to help heal Tama as Zoro intimidates Urashima into leaving. Having watch from afar, Bepo, Penguin and Shachi go to inform Law of Luffy's arrival in Wano.
900	9	"The Greatest Day of My Life! Otama and Her Sweet Red-bean Soup!"; Transliteration: "Saikō no Hi – O-Tama Hajimete no O-Shiruko" (Japanese: 最高の日 お玉初めてのおしるこ)	Directed by : Tasuku Shimaya; Storyboarded by : Aya Komaki	Shōji Yonemura	Kenji Yokoyama	September 1, 2019
Luffy, Tsuru and Kiku prepare the medicine for Tama. Okiku also helps to bandage up Zoro after he sustained an injury during the battle with Hawkins. After Otama recovers, Otsuru treats her to oshiruko (sweet red bean soup), As she eats, Tama say the kibi dangos she pulls from her cheeks offer no nutritional value, before she declares that this is the best birthday ever. Zoro makes a new alias for Luffy, Luffytaro, to hide his identity, though Otsuru already figured out they are foreigners, but promises to keep their secret. Luffy and Zoro learns from Otsuru how Kaido and Orochi pollute the environment and turn Wano into a wasteland and that while the wealthy who live in places like Bakura Town have clean food and water from the Paradise Farm, which Oden originally made for everyone, the impoverished are forced to live off of scraps, which is how Okobore Town gets its name (which means "leftovers"). Otsuru then gets attacked by Batman, a bat SMILE Fruit Gifter, for taking ill of the shogun but is saved by Zoro. While Luffy and Zoro fend off Batman's arrows, Otama gets abducted.
901	10	"Charging into the Enemy's Territory! Bakura Town – Where Officials Thrive!"; Transliteration: "Tekijin Totsunyū – Yakunin Habikoru Bakura-chō!" (Japanese: 敵陣突入 役人はびこる博羅町！)	Satoshi Itō	Hitoshi Tanaka	Masahiro Kitazaki	September 8, 2019
Luffy, Zoro and Kiku, who reveals herself as a samurai, chase after Gazelleman, the gazelle SMILE Fruit Gifter that abducted Tama, but they fail to catch up. He arrives in a residence in Bakura Town, the town where Orochi's officials and Kaido's men live. He hands Tama over to Holdem, a lion SMILE Fruit user, who has a lion's arms and head (named Kamijiro) growing out of his stomach and one of three Headliners ruling over the Town, who wants to know how Tama's powers work. When she tries to play dumb, Holdem decides to threaten her with pliers. Luffy's group arrive at the entrance of the town but get stopped by the guards. Bepo, Sachi and Penguin see them using binoculars from a nearby hilltop, and they find Law who was chilling in an abandoned building, and inform him that Luffy has arrived.
902	11	"The Yokozuna Appears! The Invincible Urashima Goes After Okiku!"; Transliteration: "Yokozuna Tōjō – O-Kiku Nerau Muteki no Urashima!" (Japanese: 横綱登場 お菊狙う無敵の浦島！)	Katsumi Tokoro	Tomohiro Nakayama	Masahiro Kitazaki	September 15, 2019
Luffy, Zoro, Kiku and Komachiyo enter Bakura Town to rescue Tama after Luffy knocks out the guards with his Conqueror's Haki. Kiku explains that no in town will aid them, as everyone in the town either works for Orochi or is under his influence. They later come across Urashima participating in sumo matches. After Urashima's men grab Okiku and bring her to the ring, Kiku rejects Urashima by cutting off his topknot. Enraged, Urashima attacks her but Luffy steps in and clashes with him.
903	12	"A Climactic Sumo Battle! Straw Hat vs. the Strongest Ever Yokozuna!"; Transliteration: "Sumō Kessen – Mugiwara tai Saikyō no Yokozuna!" (Japanese: 相撲決戦 麦わらVS最強の横綱！)	Directed by : Yusuke Suzuki; Storyboarded by : Yutaka Nakashima	Ryo Yamazaki	Shūichi Itō	September 22, 2019
Luffy faces against Urashima in a sumo match. Unable to over power Luffy Urashima starts using illegal moves, but Luffy sends him flying him with a Third Gear palm thrust. Holdem tries to pull off Tama's cheek with pliers until the defeat Urashima comes crashing into Holdem's residence. The crowd then recognizes Zoro from his wanted posters. Law prepares to head out but becomes preoccupied help Bepo who ate fish from the contaminated river, while Luffy, Zoro and Okiku wait for the town's boss to appear.
904	13	"Luffy Rages! Rescue Otama from Danger!"; Transliteration: "Rufi Gekido – Pinchi no Otama o Sukue!" (Japanese: ルフィ激怒 ピンチのお玉を救え！)	Masahiro Hosoda	Shinzō Fujita	Masayuki Takagi	September 29, 2019
Luffy, Zoro, and Okiku fight back against the attacking Beast Pirates and their samurai allies. Meanwhile, another Headliner, the centaur-like Speed, a horse SMILE Fruit user, gathers the latest harvest from the Paradise Farm. Afterwards, Luffy calls out to Holdem who approaches the group while holding Tama hostage in Kamijiro's jaws. Holdem comes to believe that Luffy is a subordinate to the bandit Shutenmaru, as Law and his crew observe Hawkins entering the town.
905	14	"Taking Back Otama! A Fierce Fight Against Holdem!"; Transliteration: "Otama Dakkan Gekitō! Hōrudemu-sen!" (Japanese: お玉奪還 激闘！ホールデム戦！)	Tasuku Shimaya	Akiko Inoue	Masahiro Shimanuki	October 6, 2019
Holdem continues to taunt Luffy's group while holding Otama hostage, threatening to chew her up with Kamijiro. Okiku warns Luffy against attacking Holdem as Kuri is ruled by Jack and he will destroy Bakura Town if they fight back. Speed arrives with the Treasure Ship of food from Paradise Farm. Luffy orders Zoro to steal the food cart, which he does with Okiku's and Komachiyo's help. As Hawkins enters Bakura Town, he is confronted by a masked Law. Luffy proceeds to punch Kamijiro and rescue Otama, only to see the injuries on her cheek Holdem caused, causing him to punch Holdem with Red Hawk, reminding Tama of Ace.
906	15	"Duel! The Magician and the Surgeon of Death!"; Transliteration: "Ikkiuchi – Majutsushi to Shi no Gekai!" (Japanese: 一騎打ち 魔術師と死の外科医！)	Directed by : Yasunori Koyama; Storyboarded by : Toshinori Fukuzawa	Shōji Yonemura	Shigefumi Shingaki	October 13, 2019
After defeating Holdem, Luffy grabs Otama and flees the scene. During the escape, they encounter Speed and Tama tames her with a kibi dango. Meanwhile, Law fights Hawkins, with Law unable to injure him because of his power and Hawkins figuring out Law's identity because of his powers and hand tattoos. Luffy, Tama and Speed then catch up to Zoro, Kiku and Komachiyo as they flee with the stolen food cart, but Luffy leaves saying they forgot something important. As Law and Hawkins continue their battle, Law incapacitates Hawkins' underlings, preventing the Headliner from using them to redirect damage. Their battle is then interrupted when the food cart passes by them. After jumping on the food cart, Law reprimands Zoro for his group's actions.
Romance Dawn
907	16	"20th Anniversary Special! Romance Dawn"; Transliteration: "20-Shūnen! - Tokubetsu-hen Romansu Dōn" (Japanese: 20周年！特別編ロマンスドーン)	Kōhei Kureta	Shōji Yonemura	Kimitaka Itō & Eisaku Inoue	October 20, 2019
An adaptation of the second Romance Dawn one-shot manga, a predecessor to One Piece. The pirate Luffy is sailing in a search of "Piece Mains", pirates that focus on adventure and attack the "Morganeer" pirates who plunder lawlessly, when a Ruku ("monster bird") named Balloon lands in his ship. Luffy hands Balloon over to the nearby sorcerer pirate Speil, but gets imprisoned on Spiel's ship after insulting him. Luffy is trapped with Anne, a close friend of Balloon who explains that Spiel is after his magic blood and has kidnapped her as bait. Luffy in turn mentions that he was inspired by his pirate grandfather, and as a child unknowingly ate the Gum-Gum Devil Fruit belonging to him. Luffy uses his rubber powers to break them both out but is uninterested in saving Balloon. Spiel shoots Anne after discovering her unlocking Balloon's cage and attacks Luffy when insulted again. Losing the fight and having obtained the Ruku he was after, Spiel destroys his ship with his former crew still aboard and uses Balloon to escape. After Anne saves him from drowning, Luffy successfully fights Spiel and rescues Balloon. Luffy then part ways with Anne and Ballon, as the narrator states the whole world would soon come to know the name, Monkey D. Luffy.
Wano Country
908	17	"The Coming of the Treasure Ship! Luffytaro Returns the Favor!"; Transliteration: "Takarabune Tōrai – Rufitarō no Ongaeshi!" (Japanese: 宝船到来 ルフィ太郎の恩返し！)	Yutaka Nakashima	Hitoshi Tanaka	Toshio Deguchi	October 27, 2019
As Zoro's group delivers the stolen food cart to Okobore Town a trio of Beast Pirates tries to stop them only to be crushed when Luffy drops a large tub of clean water that he stole on them. Meanwhile, Hawkins informs his higher-ups of Luffy's, Law's and Zoro's actions. As the people of Okobore Town celebrate, Luffy makes a vow to Tama that by the time he leaves Wano, he will make it so that she can eat her fill every day, something that Tama remembers Ace said he would do years ago. After Luffy parts ways with Tama and Speed, Law takes the group to the ruins of Oden Castle. Kiku gets suspicious of them because they plan to visit Oden's castle. Law explains that they are going to meet the "Ghosts of Wano" at the mountain there is an "unbelievable truth." At the top of the mountain, there are weathered graves marked for Kanjuro, Raizo, Momonosuke, Kin'emon, and Oden.
909	18	"Mysterious Grave Markers! A Reunion at the Ruins of Oden Castle!"; Transliteration: "Nazo no Bohyō – Oden Jōseki de no Saikai!" (Japanese: 謎の墓標 おでん城跡での再会！)	Aya Komaki	Tomohiro Nakayama	Kenji Yokoyama	November 10, 2019
As the group heads up the mountain, Luffy is skeptical about seeing ghost. Luffy's group then encounters a ferocious tiger wielding a sword in its mouth that Zoro decides to fight while the others arrive at the ruins of Oden Castle. In the Flower Capital, an adult expresses disgust on how children are being taught lies and propaganda that paints and the Kouzuki as villains and Orochi as a hero. Elsewhere, an incognito Robin listens in on the city's money manager, "Napping" Kyoshio, on how Orochi believes that the last word's spoken by Oden's wife twenty years ago is a curse in where Kouzuki Clan's nine samurai, the Akazaya Nine, will return in twenty years to claim Orochi's life. After seeing the graves of the Kozuki Family, Luffy reunites with Kin'emon, as Luffy chastises Law for making it sound like Kin'emon was dead. Kiku then arrives and reveals she knows Kin'emon happily reuniting with him. Luffy then reunites with Momonosuke, as Sanji, Nami, Brook, Chopper and Carrot. Once inside Oden Castle, Kin'emon reveals that he, Momonosuke, Kiku, Raizo and Kanjuro are from twenty years in the past.
910	19	"A Legendary Samurai! The Man Who Roger Admired!"; Transliteration: "Densetsu no Samurai – Rojā ga Horeta Otoko!" (Japanese: 伝説の侍 ロジャーが惚れた男！)	Satoshi Itō	Shinzō Fujita	Kazuya Hisada	November 17, 2019
Kin'emon explains to Luffy's group what happened in the past. He recounts stories such as the one of his Lord and Momonosuke's farther, Kozuki Oden. Despite being the son of Shogun Sukiyaki, Oden's nonconformist lifestyle and violent ways led to his banishment from the Flower Capital. Sometime later he brought order to the once lawless Kuri after defeating the criminal Ashura Doji, and reforming the criminals that lived there, eventually being given the title of daimyo of Kuri at the age of twenty, though he maintained he disorderly behavior. Meanwhile, Dogstorm reminisces on how when he and Cat Viper washed ashore on Wano, Oden saved them from being persecuted for their appearance and took them under his wing. After beating the tiger, Zoro turns his attention to a nearby fishing pier. Kin'emon continues telling how Kaido and Orochi formed an alliance and had Oden executed as a criminal. Kin'emon, Kanjuro, Kiku, Raizo and another samurai were able to escape the same fate and headed to Oden Castle as they knew Orochi would target Momonosuke next, but were forced to abandon the captured Cat Viper and Dogstorm. They'd arrived at the already burning Oden Castle to rescue Momonosuke, as well as his mother Toki and his younger sister Hiyori. Toki, having been rumored to be from the distant past, having decided to die in the time of her husband, used her Time-Time Fruit ability to send Kin'emon, Kanjuro, Kiku, Raizo and Momonosuke into the future, with Kin'emon vowing to avenge Oden and fulfill his lord's dream of opening Wano's borders. After arriving into the future, Kin'emon's group learned of what has happened to their home, and were surprised to find allies still loyal to Oden.
911	20	"Bringing Down the Emperor of the Sea! A Secret Raid Operation Begins!"; Transliteration: "Datō Yonkō – Gokuhi Uchiiri Sakusen Hatsudō" (Japanese: 打倒四皇 極秘討ち入り作戦発動)	Daisuke Nakajima	Ryo Yamazaki	Masahiro Kitazaki	November 24, 2019
When Kin'emon's group dispared over what has happened to their home, there hope was restored when they met those still loyal to the Koukuki Clan, who explained that those who bare a reversed crescent moon tattoo on their left ankle are allies waiting for the moment to avenge Oden. Afterwards, Kiku remained in Wano to gather information while Kin'emon, Kanjuro, Raizo and Momonosuke left the country to gather allies against Kaido, which eventually lead to them meeting the Straw Hats in Punk Hazard. Kin'emon explains their plan to gather at least five thousand allies, were in two weeks, they'll raid an island which looks like a horned skull near the Land of Wano that serves as the Beast Pirate's base, Onigashima, during the annual Fire Festival, were a banquet will be held with Kaido and Orochi in attendance. It is then revealed that Otsuru is Kin'emon's wife. Kin'emon then explains the preparation they have done till now, Zoro and Usopp being task to find allies by handing out encrypted flyers, Franky is working as a carpenter to find the blueprints for Kaido's mansion while Robin, disguised as a geisha, gathers information in Orochi's palace and assigns new tasks to the group after giving them disguises with his Garb-Garb Fuit ability. Brook is disguised as a Ghost to gather food from the capital, Sanji will use his culinary skills to aid in finding allies, Chopper and Carrot will aid Dogstorm, while Nami will be under the guise of a ninja with the aid of kunoichi ally, Shinobu. Kin'emon then advises them to be on the lookout of three other members of the Akazaya Nine, Kawamatsu, Ashura Doji and Denjiro.
912	21	"The Strongest Man in the World! Shutenmaru, the Thieves Brigade Chief!"; Transliteration: "Saikyō no Otoko – Tōzoku-dan Tōryō: Shutenmaru!" (Japanese: 最強の男 盗賊団棟梁・酒天丸！)	Directed by : Masahiro Hosoda; Storyboarded by : Akitaro Daichi	Akiko Inoue	Masayuki Takagi	December 1, 2019
When Sanji inquires about Ashura Doji, Kin'emon explains that after Oden defeated him, Ashura pledge loyalty to Oden, though unfortunately he's returned to his criminal ways under the alias Shutenmaru. While Usopp looks for allies in Wano, Shutenmaru and the Mt. Atama Thieves plunder Okobore Town. Jack suddenly arrives and confronts Shutenmaru which quickly turns into a fight, but they are interrupted when Kaido arrives, flying in the form of an azure dragon.
913	22	"Everyone is Annihilated! Kaido's Furious Blast Breath!"; Transliteration: "Zen'in Shōmetsu – Kaidō Ikari no Boro Buresu!" (Japanese: 全員消滅 カイドウ怒りのボロブレス！)	Yusuke Suzuki	Tomohiro Nakayama	Eisaku Inoue	December 8, 2019
The drunken Kaido flies above Okobore Town in his dragon form and threatens Shutenmaru and all the people in the town. Luffy starts running towards the town to rescue them, with Law going after him. Kin'emon and Kiku soon follows when the former learns his wife is in the village. However, Hawkins arrives and guides Kaido's rampage towards the ruins of Oden Castle were the emperor uses his Blast Breath technique to destroy both it and the mountain top with a single blast of fire as Luffy, Law, Kin'emon and Kiku can only watch in horror.
914	23	"Finally Clashing! The Ferocious Luffy vs. Kaido!"; Transliteration: "Tsuini Gekitotsu – Mōkō Rufi tai Kaidō" (Japanese: 遂に激突 猛攻ルフィVSカイドウ)	Yasunori Koyama	Shinzō Fujita	Masahiro Shimanuki & Kimitaka Itō	December 15, 2019
Right after the destruction of Oden Castle, an enraged Luffy strikes Kaido with an Elephant Gun. Under Kiku's advice Kin'emon heads to the town to ensure Otsuru's safety as Kikuu goes to the mountain to try and find the others. Luffy then comes across a severely injured Speed and learns she and Tama were attacked by Kaido. Law shows up and tries to convince Luffy to retreat, but he's too consumed by rage and instead enters a furious battle with Kaido.
915	24	"Destructive! One Shot, One Kill – Thunder Bagua!"; Transliteration: "Hakai-teki! Ichigeki Hissatsu no Raimei Hakke!" (Japanese: 破壊的！一撃必殺の雷鳴八卦！)	Katsumi Tokoro	Ryo Yamazaki	Shigefumi Shingaki	December 22, 2019
Luffy continues his furious battle with Kaido repeatedly attacking with Third Gear. When Kaido reverts into his human form Luffy activates Fourth Gear: Bounceman and unleashes a relentless barrage of blows. But in the end, Kaido is unaffected by Luffy's attacks and defeats him with a single swing of his kanabō. Law tries to save Luffy, but his powers are nullified when Hawkins strikes him with a nail made of Seastone, revealing the substance originates from Wano. As Law is forced to flee by himself, Kaido notes that even though unconscious, Luffy continues to glare at him as the emperor scoffs at Luffy's aspirations at becoming King of the Pirates.
916	25	"A Living Hell! Luffy, Humiliated in the Great Mine!"; Transliteration: "Iki-Jigoku! Rufi Kutsujoku no Dai Saikutsu-jō" (Japanese: 生き地獄 ルフィ屈辱の大採掘場)	Yutaka Nakashima	Shōji Yonemura	Shūichi Itō	January 5, 2020
After his defeat, Luffy is sent to a prison in the Udon region to have his spirit broken to make him join Kaido's crew. As Kin'emon watches Otsuru far afar, reframing from reuniting with her until their mission is complete, he spots Ashura Doji (Shutenmaru). Kiku returns to the mountain where Oden Castle was destroyed and discovers that the group there managed to escape the destruction thanks to Shinobu using her Ripe-Ripe Fruit to rot a hole in the ground. Franky, Robin, Usopp, and Zoro read the news about Luffy's fight with Kaido and are shocked to learn of their captain's defeat. Dogstorm and his group discover Tama alive and take her into the forest. At the Prison Mines in Udon, a strange being is constantly fed poison fish, but spits out fish bones at the guards when they aren't deboned. Luffy is sent to his cell next Kid, they both swear revenge against Kaido, which causes them to both notice and recognize each other as the curtains close on Act One of the Wano Arc.
917	26	"The Holyland in Tumult! Emperor of the Sea Blackbeard Cackles!"; Transliteration: "Seichi Gekidō – Futeki ni Warau Yonkō Kurohige" (Japanese: 聖地激動 不敵に笑う四皇黒ひげ)	Aya Komaki	Hitoshi Tanaka	Kenji Yokoyama	January 12, 2020
Perona learns from a newspaper that Gecko Moria is alive and prepares to leave Kuraigana Island to search for him. Moria and his zombie army attack the Pirate Island, Fullalead, to find Absalom only to learn that the Blackbeard Pirates had killed him, as he's cornered by Shiryu, who now has Absalom's Clear-Clear Fruit powers, and Catarina Devon, who had eaten the Dog-Dog Fruit, Mythical Type Model: Nine-Tailed Fox. After reading the newspaper, Blackbeard foresees how the entire events unfolded from the Straw Hats entering Wano where Kaido resides, to the Revolutionary Army infiltrating Mary Geoise to rescue Bartholomew Kuma and Big Mom in pursuit of the Straw Hats.
918	27	"It's On! The Special Operation to Bring Down Kaido!"; Transliteration: "Ugokidasu – Datō Kaidō Daikeikaku!" (Japanese: 動き出す 打倒カイドウ大計画！)	Masahiro Hosoda	Akiko Inoue	Kazuya Hisada	January 19, 2020
Dogstorm clashes with Ashura, who refuses to aid in Kin'emon's operation. Meanwhile, Sanji, under the guise of a soba cook, and the others seek out recruits. While looking they hear of a killer named Kamazo and a thief who steals from nobles and gives to the poor called Ushimitsu Kozo. Meanwhile, Nami and Shinobu spy on Orochi's mansion. Shinobu uses her Devil Fruit powers to decay holes into the attic, where they spy on Orochi's men from above. However, they are caught and barely escape with Shinobu panicking. In Onigashima, the other two Lead Performers of the Beasts Pirates, King and Queen, reprimand Jack for not bringing in enough offerings from Kuri.
919	28	"Rampage! The Prisoners – Luffy and Kid!"; Transliteration: "Dai Abare! Shūjin Rufi to Kiddo!" (Japanese: 大暴れ！囚人ルフィとキッド！)	Satoshi Itō	Atsuhiro Tomioka	Kazuya Hisada	January 26, 2020
Nami and Shinobu finish their current objective in the Flower Capital and escape via kite as Sanji's soba stand is growing more popular. In Udon, Luffy and Kid form a rivalry as they continue to work, carrying hundreds of huge stone blocks despite the strength drained from wearing Seastone handcuffs, earning a lot of tickets to exchange for food as a result. When the vice-warden, Headliner Dobon, a hippo SMILE user who rides inside a hippo's mouth, as legs have become infused with the bottom lip, tries to attack Luffy and Kid for eating all the food by having hippo swallow them, where Dobon could attack them inside the hippo's stomach but is beaten by the pair. When the guards threaten to punish them, Kid retorts they have no proof as Luffy picks up an injured old man. The prisoners then start to cheer for them as they walk away.
920	29	"A Great Sensation! Sanji's Special Soba!"; Transliteration: "Dai Hyōban! Sanji no Ohako Soba!" (Japanese: 大評判！サンジの十八番そば！)	Yutaka Nakashima	Shinzō Fujita	Keita Saitō & Toshio Deguchi	February 2, 2020
Sanji tangles with some yakuza members from the Kyoshiro Family who disrupt his soba business. After beating them with some help from Franky, Sanji remakes some soba for a girl who constantly laughs named Toko. Toko then leaves to her job as a kamuro (child attendant) for Wano's most famous oiran, Komurasaki. Robin then receives an invitation to perform at Orochi's palace. At the Prison Mine, Luffy gives some of his food tickets to Hyo, the old man he helped earlier. Raizo then appears, having snuck into the prison. He reveals that he knows the location of the key to Luffy's Seastone handcuffs, but it is kept under tight security before he disappears and goes to steal the key. Back in the Flower Capital, Komurasaki precession approaches.
921	30	"Luxurious and Gorgeous! Wano's Most Beautiful Woman – Komurasaki!"; Transliteration: "Gōka Kenran – Wano Kuni Ichi no Bijo: Komurasaki" (Japanese: 豪華絢爛 ワノ国一の美女・小紫)	Directed by : Yasunori Koyama; Storyboarded by : Hiroshi Hara	Tomohiro Nakayama	Masahiro Kitazaki	February 9, 2020
At the Prison Mine, Luffy is approached by Caribou who ask for food, but an annoyed Luffy tells him to go away. It is revealed that after his defeat by Luffy and Pekoms, Caribou was in a series of events that eventually led to his capture by Drake and sent to work hard labor in Udon. Kyoshiro is unfazed upon learning of Sanji's actions against his underling and advises to have Queen send assassins to deal with it. As Komuasaki's processions continues, three men whom Komuasaki seduced into giving up all their wealth and possessions attempts to assassinate her. They are stopped by her guards before being thrown out of the capital for their now impoverished status.
922	31	"A Tale of Chivalry! Zoro and Tonoyasu's Little Trip!"; Transliteration: "Ninkyō Den! Zoro to Tonoyasu Futari-tabi!" (Japanese: 任侠伝！ゾロとトの康二人旅！)	Yusuke Suzuki	Ryo Yamazaki	Masayuki Takagi	February 16, 2020
Zoro goes to a gambling house with a sycophant named Tonoyasu. After Zoro exposes the house of cheating, a brawl breaks out. Afterwards, Zoro and Tonoyasu go to Ebisu Town, which Zoro assumes is wealthy as it is named after the god of fortune. Meanwhile, the Ninja-Pirate-Mink-Samurai Alliance works to steal weapons and food while pinning the blame on Mt. Atama Thieves. Franky learns that head carpenter Minatomo no longer has the blueprints of Kaido's mansion. He goes all over the Flower Capital searching for them but hits a dead end. At the shogun's castle, CP-0 attempts to negotiate for weapons with Orochi, who demands that Vegapunk to be brought to Wano, all the while boasting that he's untouchable with Kaido backing him. Meanwhile, Momonosuke reveals to Tama that he has a younger sister named Kozuki Hiyori, and he does not know whether or not she is alive, but doesn't want to look for her out of fear that Orochi would go after her.
923	32	"A State of Emergency! Big Mom Closes in!" Transliteration: "Kinkyū Jitai – Biggu Mamu Dai Sekkin!" (Japanese: 緊急事態 ビッグ・マム大接近！)	Directed by : Katsumi Tokoro; Storyboarded by : Akitaro Daichi	Shōji Yonemura	Masahiro Shimanuki	February 23, 2020
Once arriving in Ebisu Town, Zoro discovers that it is just as poor as Okobore Town, but despite that, all the townsfolk laugh despite their misery. The banquet at Orochi's palace begins and Robin begins her mission. Shinobu, Nami and Brook sneak into the palace as well. While as a ghost, Brook is shocked to find a ponegylph in the palace. Meanwhile, in Udon prison, as Caribou begs Luffy to bring him along in any escape attempt, he mentions that he heard a rumor Kid lost his left arm to one of Big Mom's subordinates. Kid suddenly appears and debunks this rumor. He explained he and his crew went to Big Mom's territory, injured one of her Sweet Generals, and plundered something. He also states that he never intended to take down Big Mom and that he lost his arm in a prior battle against the Red Hair Pirates. Kid then argues with Luffy over which one of them will defeat Kaido. Back at the Flower Capital, two of the Tobi Roppo, the top six Headliners of the Beast Pirates, Page One in the form of a spinosaurus and X Drake in his Human-Beast Form arrive to hunt down Sanji, with Hawkins arriving as well. In the seas surrounding Wano Country, the Big Mom Pirates draw closer, having wrangled several giant koi fish to pull their ship up the falls.
924	33	"The Capital in an Uproar! Another Assassin Targets Sanji!"; Transliteration: "Miyako Sōzen! Sanji Nerau Aratana Shikaku" (Japanese: 都騒然！サンジ狙う新たな刺客)	Tasuku Shimaya	Hitoshi Tanaka	Eisaku Inoue & Kimitaka Itō	March 15, 2020
King transforms into a pteranodon with his Dragon-Dragon Fruit, Ancient Type Model: Pteranodon powers and flies to the waterfall while the Big Mom Pirates ascend and knocks their ship down with Big Mom falling into the sea. Meanwhile, back at the capital, Page One in Dragon-Dragon Fruit, Ancient Type Model: Spinosaurus Beast Form attacks multiple soba shops and owners looking for Sanji. Hearing the cries, Sanji comes to fight Page One. As he prepares to fight, he pulls out his Raid Suit canister.
925	34	"Dashing! The Righteous Soba Mask!"; Transliteration: "Dai Katsuyaku! Masayoshi no O-Soba Masuku!" (Japanese: 大活躍！正義のおそばマスク！)	Midori Tanaka	Akiko Inoue	Kenji Yokoyama	March 22, 2020
As he confronts Page One, Sanji puts on his Raid Suit in order to disguise himself. Law, who as a child was a fan of Sora, Warrior of the Sea comic strip, which is popular in the North Blue, recognizes it as Germa 66's Stealth Black. Unwilling to be associated with Germa, Sanji instead dons the name Soba Mask. As Sanji fights Page One with the Raid Suit he and displays its capabilities, including invisibility. As Saniji notes the cruel irony of how his childhood dream of invisibility came true through the Germa technology that he hated, Page One transform into his Human-Beast Form and rengages with Sanji. After unleashing one powerful attack, Sanji escapes into the sky as Usopp, Law and Franky also flee to avoid being identified. Back in the shogun's caste, Robin sneaks around trying to find important information but she is confronted by the Orochi Oniwabanshu, Orochi's personal ninja force, as Fukurokuju, the ninja leader, gives Robin a chance to explain herself.
926	35	"A Desperate Situation! Orochi's Menacing Oniwabanshu!"; Transliteration: "Zettai Zetsumei – Kyōi no Orochi Oniwabanshū" (Japanese: 絶体絶命 脅威のオロチお庭番衆)	Ryōsuke Tanaka	Shinzō Fujita	Shūichi Itō	March 29, 2020
Off the coast of the Land of Wano, the Big Mom Pirates try to figure out their next course of actions. Meanwhile, in Orochi Castle, Komurasaki dons a kitsune mask and begins playing her shamisen, something the one other geisha notes she always does when playing a specific song. Robin is caught by the Orochi Oniwabanshu in Orochi's castle. They attack her in order to learn what her intentions are but with the help of her Devil Fruit, she escapes and rejoins the banquet. Meanwhile, Chopper, Kiku, Tama and Momonosuke find Big Mom who drifts to the shore after the encounter with King. Chopper and the others then discover that Big Mom has lost her memories.
927	36	"Pandemonium! The Monster Snake, Shogun Orochi!"; Transliteration: "Shura-jō! Osoreru Daija – Shōgun Orochi" (Japanese: 修羅場！怒れる大蛇 将軍オロチ)	Satoshi Itō	Atsuhiro Tomioka	Shigefumi Shingaki & Keiichi Ichikawa	April 5, 2020
At Kuri Beach, Chopper gives the amnesiac Big Mom a fake name, Olin. Back inside the shogun's castle, Orochi warns his guests about the return of the Akazaya Nine. After hearing the guests quietly mock him for his cowardice, Toko laughs out loud, enraging Orochi. As he lashes out at Toko, Komurasaki steps in and slaps him. Komurasaki refuses to apologize for her transgression and Orochi, in a fit of rage, uses the power of his Snake-Snake Fruit, Mythical Type Model: Yamata No Orochi to transform into an eight-headed serpent and goes on a rampage. Robin tries to flee with Toko but she is found by the Orochi Oniwabanshu. As the guests attempt to flee Kyoshiro maniacally laughs as the chaos unfolds as he draws his blade.
928	37	"The Flower Falls! The Final Moment of the Most Beautiful Woman in the Land of Wano!"; Transliteration: "Hana Chiru! Wano Kuni Ichi no Bijo no Saigo" (Japanese: 花散る！ワノ国一の美女の最期)	Katsumi Tokoro	Tomohiro Nakayama	Kazuya Hisada	April 12, 2020
Orochi takes his rage out on Komurasaki as Robin protects Toko. Brook arrives and frightens several of the ninja and invertedly causes Toko to pass out from fright as Robin begins to fight back. In the attic, as Nami and Shinobu prepare to help they are intercepted by the ninja, Hanzo, but when he comments on how she lost her beauty from her youth, Shinobu incapacitates him with her signature move, a blow to the groin. Shinobu then rots the attic's floor causing debis to fall on Orochi, causing him release his grip on Komurasaki. During the commotion, Kyoshiro faces the oiran and cuts her down before finding one of Kin'emon's encrypted messages. Orochi then pursues Robin and Toko, intending to kill the little girl. Nami manages to stop Orochi with Zeus' help. Afterwards, the group at the castle escapes with Shinobu. In Udon prison, Kid has escaped. At Okobore Town, after feeding her oshiruko, Chopper's group convinces Big Mom to travel with them to Udon, telling her the person in charge there has more.
929	38	"The Bond Between Prisoners! Luffy and Old Man Hyo!"; Transliteration: "Shūjin no Kizuna – Rufi to Hyōjii!" (Japanese: 囚人の絆 ルフィとヒョウじい！)	Yasunori Koyama	Ryo Yamazaki	Eisaku Inoue	April 19, 2020
In the Ringo region, Kanjuro meets up with Shinobu's group at the Northern Cemetery. The group wanders if leaving Toko at Kyoshiro's plesure house was a good idea, given the man's actions, as Kanjuro and talk about Hyougoro the Flower, an honorable yakuza head from twenty years ago. After discussing their findings, the group decide to go back to the Flower Capital to relax at a bathhouse. In Ebisu Town, Law's group learns from a newspaper that a funeral for Komurasaki will be held and that Kid escaped from Udon prison. The Big Mom Pirates are back at the bottom of the waterfall. They cannot go back up because King is defending the top. They know that Big Mom survived the fall as Perospero's Vivre Card is still intact, so they decide to wait at the bottom for any news. Meanwhile, as Chopper's group and Big Mom are currently traveling Udon in hopes to free Luffy, Chopper notes that Napoleon is remaining dormant. Momonosuke practices his swordsmanship to prepare for the final battle, and he yells the word "Sunacchi" which he tells Kiku he learned from Zoro. However, Kiku tells him never to say that again, revealing it was once part of Kuri residents' dialect in older times and it was not fit for someone of Momonosuke's status. In Udon prison, as Luffy is questioned by the alpaca SMILE Gifter, Alpacaman, on Kid's escape, Hyo tries to make good use of the meal tickets that Luffy generously gave to him, but the vice-warden, Headliner Daifugo Scorpion SMILE user, approaches and torments the elderly man.
930	39	"A Lead Performer! Queen the Plague Emerges!"; Transliteration: "Ōkanban! Ekisai no Kuīn Arawaru" (Japanese: 大看板! 疫災のクイーン現る！)	Yusuke Suzuki	Shōji Yonemura	Masahiro Shimanuki	June 28, 2020 (Note: This episode was originally scheduled to air on April 26, 2020, but was subsequently delayed and replaced with a rerun of episode 892.)
Raizo manages to steal some keys from the Prisoner Mines executive tower. Meanwhile, Hyo, who's revealed to be the former yakuza head, Hyogoro the Flower, refuses to tell Daifugo who gave him the food tickets. When the vice-warden threatens to kill Hyogoro, Luffy kicks Daifugo to defend the old man and then fights the guards until the prison's warden, Headliner Babanuki, an elephant SMILE user with an elephant head from his stomach, fires a cannonball from the elephant's trunk at him. Luffy note that he cannot use his Haki because of the Seastone cuffs. Headliner, Solitaire, the prison's vice warden and a monkey SMILE user, finds out about the stolen keys. As Queen arrives at the Prisoner Mines, and performs a short musical number. With the guards distracted, Luffy carries Hyo away, attempting to climb a wall to escape the prison. Babanuki describes the circumstances to Queen, telling him about Kid's escape, the stolen keys and Luffy attempting to escape. Queen tells his men to chase after Luffy.
931	40	"Climb Up! Luffy's Desperate Escape!"; Transliteration: "Yojinobore – Rufi Kesshi no Tōsō-geki!" (Japanese: よじ登れ ルフィ決死の逃走劇！)	Yutaka Nakashima	Akiko Inoue	Yūsuke Isōchi	July 5, 2020
Luffy and Hyougoro fail to escape and are quickly surrounded by the Beast Pirates. They manage to defeat some of the soldiers but are detained by Daifugo and Babanuki. Meanwhile, Usopp, Franky, and Law hide at a house in Ebisu Town, as Yasuie tells them Zoro ran off after someone stole one of his swords. Usopp, Franky, and Law start to wonder where Sanji is when Usopp realizes he's going to use his Raid Suit to sneak into women bathhouses. At the bathhouse in the Flower Capital, Shinobu tell Nami and Robin about Hyogoro, who was highly-respected person during Oden's reign, often using his influence to help those in need, even gaining the loyalty from the leaders of the other five regions and Oden himself. However, it is rumoured that when Hyougoro refused to serve Orochi after took over he was killed. On the other hand, Fukurokuju agreed to serve Orochi and was spared, becoming the leader of his personal ninja force, with Shinobu being a member before defecting. In Udon prison, Raizo is surprised to see that the prisoner being fed poisoned fish is Kawamatsu while Queen forces Luffy and Hyogoro fight in sumo matches with collars that will cut their heads off if they leave the ring, giving Luffy a chance to live if he agrees to join the Beast Pirates. Queen then uncuffs Luffy to give him a fighting chance, leaving Raizo shocked upon realizing he stole the wrong key. Luffy then asks if they could be released from prison if they beat Queen.
932	41	"Dead or Alive! Queen's Sumo Inferno!"; Transliteration: "Sei ka Shi ka – Kuīn no Ōzumō Inferuno" (Japanese: 生か死か クイーンの大相撲地獄(インフェルノ))	Masahiro Hosoda	Hitoshi Tanaka	Masayuki Takagi	July 12, 2020
At the Prisoner Mines, the Sumo Inferno begins, but Luffy easily knocks out his opponents with Conqueror's Haki. Meanwhile, at the Flower Capital bathhouse, Drake and Hawkins arrive to search for those associated with the Kozuki Family, having information about the reversed crescent moon ankle tattoo. As Shinobu, Robin, and Nami are accosted by Hawkins, Sanji is revealed to be at the bathhouse as well. Drake and Hawkins, who are both from North Blue, recognize Sanji's Raid Suit as Stealth Black. After a scuffle with Drake and Hawkins, Sanji escapes with Shinobu, Robin, and Nami. While flying away they discuss the possibility of a traitor among them, as the enemy knew about the ankle tattoo. Sanji also states the he's heard that Bepo, Penguin and Shachi have been captured. In Udon, as he easily defeats his opponents, Luffy tries to think of a way to beat Kaido before a memory of when Rayleigh fist show him Armament Haki gives him an idea. In the Ringo region, Zoro confronts the person who took Shusui.
933	42	"Gyukimaru! Zoro Fights a Duel on Bandit's Bridge!"; Transliteration: "Gyūkimaru! Zoro Oihagi-bashi no Kettō" (Japanese: 牛鬼丸！ゾロおいはぎ橋の決闘)	Aya Komaki	Shinzō Fujita	Toshio Deguchi & Midori Matsuda	July 19, 2020
The Sumo Inferno continues and Queen sends in the Gifters Batman and Gazelleman after Luffy defeats the Pleasures, while Luffy tries to improve his Armament Haki to the advance stage, which will allow him to hit eneies with emitted Haki without touching them. After beating the two Gifters, Luffy demands stronger opponents. Meanwhile, Chopper's group is still traveling to Udon with Chopper becoming increasingly worried of what will happen if Big Mom doesn't get oshiruko, unaware of Queen has a large supply of it due to his love for the treat. At the Oihagi Bridge, Zoro clashes with Gyukimaru, who refuses to give Shusui back, as it is a national treasure, and becomes angry when Zoro claims to have met Ryuma. As they fight, Gyukimaru talks about how the Land of Wano was once known as the Land of Gold, and Ryuma led the country's samurai in defending it from many threats, while also stating that Shusui turned into a Black Blade after Ryuma's many battles. Their fight is interrupted when a still living Komurasaki and Toko arrive seeking help as they were chased by an assassin known as Kamazo, having been ordered by Orochi to kill Toko. Zoro then decides to fight the assassin to protect the woman and girl.
934	43	"A Big Turnover! The Three-Sword Style Overcomes Danger!"; Transliteration: "Dai-Gyakuten! Shisen o Koeta Santōryū" (Japanese: 大逆転！死線を越えた三刀流！)	Tatsuya Nagamine	Tomohiro Nakayama	Midori Matsuda & Keita Saitō	July 26, 2020
Due to a leak, those allied with the Kozuki Family are arrested in the Flower Capital. Sanji's group returns to Ebisu Town where he is beaten for intruding in the bathhouse. An argument breaks out between Law and Shinobu when she blames the others for potentially jeopardizing the operation, accusing Bepo, Penguin and Shachi of telling Orochi's men about the symbol. Kanjuro tells her to stop blaming people as the operation will fail without them. Tonoyasu then enters, stating that the rebellion symbol has been leaked all over the capital, before asking if a big battle is coming. In Udon, while fighting the bear SMILE Fruit Gifter, Luffy still struggles to figure out how to use advance Armament Haki. Meanwhile, at Oihagi Bridge, Zoro continues his clash with Kamazo. During the battle Gyukimaru interferes, allowing Kamazo a land a hit on Zoro. However, Zoro mangages to take a of Kamazo's scythes and uses it as a makeshift third sword to deliver a powerful attack to defeat the assassin. Not wanting to fight Zoro, Gyukimaru decides to leave with his weapons as Zoro collapses in the snow from his injury.
935	44	"Zoro, Stunned! The Shocking Identity of the Mysterious Woman!"; Transliteration: "Zoro Kyōgaku – Shōgeki! Nazo no Bijo no Shōtai" (Japanese: ゾロ驚愕 衝撃! 謎の美女の正体)	Kenichi Takeshita	Ryo Yamazaki	Kenji Yokoyama	August 2, 2020
Luffy and Hyogoro are confronted by Alpacaman and Madilloman, an armadillo SMILE Fruit Gifter. Luffy uses his advance Observation Haki to avoid Madilloman's attacks while also giving Hyogoro instructions to avoid attacks from Alpacaman as Luffy continues trying to use an advanced Armament Haki technique. After the battle with Kamazo, Zoro's wound is treated by Komurasaki. When Zoro tries to leave to retrieve Shusui, Komurasaki and Toko convince him to stay. They tell Zoro that Gyukimaru is well known ambushing anyone who comes to Oihagi Bridge to steal their weapons. During their conversation, Komurasaki reveals herself to actually be Momonosuke's younger sister, Kozuki Hiyori.
936	45	"Get the Hang of It! The Land of Wano's Haki – Ryuo!"; Transliteration: "Etoku Seyo – Wano Kuni no Haki, Ryūō!" (Japanese: 会得せよ ワノ国の覇気・流桜！)	Tasuku Shimaya	Shōji Yonemura	Shigefumi Shingaki	August 9, 2020
After Hiyori reveals her true identity to Zoro, she explains that while her mother sent Momonosuke, Kanjuro, Raizo and Kikunojo twenty years into the future, she was left behind so that if Momonosuke did not make it into the future, the Kouzuki bloodline would not die out and how Kawamatsu the Kappa watched over her after her parents' death until they were separated when she was thirteen. After she finishes the story, Zoro tells her about the status of the operation. In Ebisu Town, after scolding Shinobu for her lack of trust, Law leaves to go save his crew. As Nami and Usopp worry about Law, they spot the three criminals from Komurasaki's procession, Bingo, Bongo and Bungo. An old woman tells Nami and Usopp that the three are actually an arson ring that bribed official to escape punishment until Hiyori, as Komurasaki, swindled them. Tonoyasu welcomed them into Ebisu Town, but they continue to act rude towards the townspeople. Back in the Sumo Inferno, after figuring out what Luffy is trying to achieve, Hyogoro defeats Alpacaman, displaying his knowledge and skills with advanced Armament Haki and offers to teach Luffy.
937	46	"Tonoyasu! Ebisu Town's Most Loved!"; Transliteration: "Tonoyasu! Ebisu-chō ichi no Ninkimono!" (Japanese: トの康！えびす町一の人気者！)	Satoshi Itō	Akiko Inoue	Kazuya Hisada	August 16, 2020
Luffy continues to try to learn how to advance his Armament Haki, which Hyogoro says it referred to as Ryuo in Wano, through fighting in the Sumo Inferno. While discussing the state of the rebellion, Tonoyasu speaks to and addresses Kanjuro and Shinobu casually, but they do not remember him as he leave to tend to the townsfolk. An old woman explains to Nami and Usopp that Tonoyasu gets his income from his daughter, Toko, who works at the capital and sends it to him, which Tonoyasu would give most of it away to the townspeople. Back in the prison Luffy continues fighting until the night and will resume the next day. After Luffy explains to Hyogoro who the Four Emperors are they are met by Raizo and Caribou, whom Raizo had recruited. As they talk about the rebellion, Hyogoro asks to join the cause, which Raizo eagerly allows. Hyougoro considers recruiting the Udon prisoners to fight for them, as most of the prisoners were arrested for treason against Orochi. The others accept this idea, and Raizo works to free Kawamatsu from of his cell. Caribou then takes out a giant pot of oshiruko stolen from Queen. Meanwhile, Big Mom approaches Udon with Kiku, Chopper, Momonosuke and Tama.
938	47	"Shaking the Nation! The Identity of Ushimitsu Kozo The Chivalrous Thief!"; Transliteration: "Shōgeki Hashiru – Gizoku Ushimitsu Kozō no Shōtai" (Japanese: 衝撃走る 義賊丑三つ小僧の正体)	Yasunori Koyama	Shinzō Fujita	Shūichi Itō	August 23, 2020
After being captured, Tonoyasu claims to be the infamous thief, Ushimitzu Kozo. When Tonoyasu bandana falls off, Fukurokuju recognizes him. When Fukurokuju tells Orochi, the shogun has Tonoyasu sentenced to public execution. Meanwhile, Holdem and his men battle the Mt. Atama Thieves, believing them responsible for the thefts committed by the Ninja-Pirate-Mink-Samurai Alliance. While clashing with Ashura Doji, Holdem sets the mountain on fire. In Ringo, Brook finds Zoro, Hiyori and Toko and when he informs them of the impending execution in the Flower Capital, Toko immediately runs out to go save her father.
939	48	"The Straw Hats Run! Save the Captive Tonoyasu!"; Transliteration: "Ichimi Hashiru! Sukue Toraware no Tonoyasu" (Japanese: 一味疾る！救え囚われのトの康)	Yusuke Suzuki	Hitoshi Tanaka	Masahiro Shimanuki	August 30, 2020
Toko and Zoro's group make their way to the Flower Capital. Tonoyasu is revealed to be Shimotsuki Yasuie the former daimyo of Hakumai. Yasuie is placed on a wooden pole and is being broadcast via video transponder snail throughout Wano, and his old acquaintances recognize him. The citizens of Ebisu Town and some of the Straw Hats rush to the execution. As Orochi heads to the execution site, Yasuie reveals that he lied about being Ushimitsu Kozo and plans to say a few things before meeting his demise. Yasuie makes his final statement. He praises the Land of Wano for being a once-beautiful country with forests and rivers thanks to the Kouzuki Family, but calls out Orochi for ruining the country, calling him nothing but vermin. Yasuie laughs even as the executioner points his rifle at him.
940	49	"Zoro's Fury! The Truth About the Smile!"; Transliteration: "Zoro no Ikari – Sumairu no Shinjitsu!" (Japanese: ゾロの怒り SMILEの真実！)	Yutaka Nakashima	Tomohiro Nakayama	Eisaku Inoue & Kimitaka Itō	September 6, 2020
As Ashura searches for Holdem for burning down his mountain base he comes across the broadcast of Yasuie before Kin'emon and Dogstorm arrive. Yasuie claims responsibility for Kin'emon's secret message, saying it was a prank, and casting doubt in the Rasetsu prison guards. As Yasuie accepts his fate it is revealed that he has changed the rendezvous point on the flyers so that the revolution will live on, before he meets a brutal end as Orochi and his men shoot him to death. As the Ebisu Town citizens "laugh" over Yasuie's death, Zoro is furious that they would do so after all he's done for them, but Hiyori explains to him that they were rob of showing any emotion except laughter because by the fruits known as SMILE.
941	50	"Toko's Tears! Orochi's Pitiless Bullets!"; Transliteration: "Toko no Namida! Orochi Hijō no Jūdan!" (Japanese: トコの涙！オロチ非情の銃弾！)	Katsumi Tokoro	Ryo Yamazaki	Masayuki Takagi	September 13, 2020
As the citizens of Ebisu Town grieve over Yasuie's death, Shinobu and Hiyori reveals more information about the SMILE fruits. Kaido wanted to increase the strength of his army so he purchased artificial Zoan fruits from Doflamingo that were made by Caesar. However, the success rate of these fruits is ten percent, meaning only ten percent of SMILE fruit eaters successfully gain an ability. The other ninety percent would permanently lose their ability to swim as well as express any emotion other than joy. Fighters of the Beast Pirates are divided into three categories; The Waiters, who have not eaten a SMILE fruit, the Gifters, who are those who gained SMILE fruit powers, and the Pleasures, are those who have eaten SMILE fruits but failed to gain powers and suffered the negative side-effects. Ebisu Town's dark history is then revealed. It was a poverty-stricken town that received its food from the capital. Orochi, for the sake of his own cruelty, took some failed SMILE fruits that have already been bitten and gave them to the town. Given no other source of food, the people of Ebisu Town ate the defective fruits and suffered its negative side effects. Toko enters the execution site, hoping to revive her father. Seeing Toko, Orochi attempts to kill her as well, blaming her for Komurasaki's death. But Zoro and Sanji step in and save her.
942	51	"The Straw Hats Step In! An Uproarious Deadly Battle at the Execution Ground!"; Transliteration: "Ichimi Ran'nyū! Sōzen! Shokei-jō no Gekitō" (Japanese: 一味乱入！騒然！処刑場の激闘)	Kōhei Kureta	Shōji Yonemura	Toshio Deguchi & Keita Saitō	September 20, 2020
Zoro and Sanji manage to save Toko. The swordsman directly attacks Orochi, who is protected by Kyoshiro, while Sanji fights against Drake, who transforms into Dragon-Dragon Fruit, Model: Ancient Type Allosaurus Beast Form. Franky saves Zoro from the firing squad and manages to recover Yasuie's body as the rest of the Straw Hats join the fight. At Udon, Luffy cheers on his crew from the sumo ring. Just then, Queen is informed that some criminals have arrived. Kamazo, who failed to assassinate Toko, and Kid, who surrendered after his escape, enter the prison. Kid immediately recognized Kamazo and asks why he's constantly laughing after having beaten up anyone who mocked his laugh and even masked his face to hide it in the past, where it is revealed that Kamazo is Kid's own crewmate, Killer. Killer was somehow forced to eat a SMILE fruit and therefore can only express happiness. Kid screams out in anguish, demanding to know who's responsible for his partner condition and as well as what happened to the rest of his crew. Angered for Kid, Luffy calls out Queen, demanding he resumes the sumo match.
943	52	"Luffy's Determination! Win Through the Sumo Inferno!"; Transliteration: "Rufi no Ketsui – Yabure Ōzumō Inferuno!" (Japanese: ルフィの決意 破れ大相撲地獄(インフェルノ)！)	Tasuku Shimaya	Akiko Inoue	Shigefumi Shingaki	September 27, 2020
Zoro clashes with Kyoshiro and Sanji clashes with Drake while Usopp takes Toko to safety. The Orochi Oniwabanshu arrive to confront the Straw Hat Pirates with Brook scaring away a few away. Back at Udon, Queen subjects Kid and Killer to water torture as he resumes the Sumo Inferno. Law arrives at the Rasetsu Town prison to rescue his captured crewmates, but is confronted by Hawkins, who used his Straw-Straw ability to make it so that Law cannot beat him without injuring his friends. When Sanji hears hearing Hiyori's cries, he disengages with Drake to save her from two of the Orochi Oniwabanshu trying to apprehend her, only for Zoro to save her first, leaving the cook shocked with jealousy. Back in the prison, Queen decides that until Luffy and Hyogoro are killed, Kid and Killer will be submerged underwater. However, Big Mom arrives at the Prisoner Mines.
944	53	"The Storm Has Come! A Raging Big Mom!"; Transliteration: "Arashi Tōrai! Ō-abare Biggu Mamu!" (Japanese: 嵐到来！大暴れビッグ・マム！)	Masahiro Hosoda	Shinzō Fujita	Kenji Yokoyama	October 4, 2020
After the skirmish inside the Flower Capital, Kin'emon confesses to Ashura that he provoked Holdem into attacking Mt. Atama. When Ashura becomes angry, Kin'emon admits his mistake for trying to force Ashura to join the rebellion and once again begs him for his help. Ashura tells the two to follow him, as he has something important to show them. After Chopper's group arrives at the Prisoner Mines, Big Mom breaks in. Chopper and Kiku, who dons a disguise, go in after her as Momonosuke and Tama stay outside. During Big Mom's search for oshiruko, Queen, refusing to share his favorite food, transforms into his Dragon-Dragon Fruit, Ancient Type Model: Brachiosaurus Beast Form to fight her, both unaware there isn't any soup left. While he and Kiku travel through the entrance, Chopper worries if the amnesiac Big Mom can fight Queen, only to find her slamming Queen's head into the ground.
945	54	"A Grudge Over Red-bean Soup! Luffy Gets into a Desperate Situation!"; Transliteration: "Oshiruko no Urami – Rufi Zettai Zetsumei" (Japanese: おしるこの恨み ルフィ絶体絶命)	Yusuke Suzuki	Hitoshi Tanaka	Kazuya Hisada	October 11, 2020
Big Mom subdues Queen when the latter tries to fight her. During the scuffle, Kid and Killer are saved from drowning and Kawamatsu's cell is broken apart. Prison guards attempt to contact Kaido in the executive tower, but Caribou stops them from doing so. He explains that the variant transponder snails used in the Land of Wano, known as Smart Snail (Smail for short), transmit very weak signals so they require a Boss Snail to transmit the signals. Raizo decides to get the keys to free the other prisoners. Big Mom does not find any oshiruko and when Luffy blurts out that he ate it, she attacks him out of rage, revealing she actually wanted to give it to the people of Okobore Town as thanks for their kindness towards her. Luffy and Hyogoro are forced out of the ring, but Luffy manages to use advance Armament Haki to remove the collars before they are killed. Afterwards, Hyogoro decides to test Luffy by having him defend against Big Mom's attack.
946	55	"Stop the Emperor of the Sea! Queen's Secret Plan!"; Transliteration: "Yonkō o Tomero! Kuīn no Hisaku" (Japanese: 四皇を止めろ！クイーンの秘策)	Yutaka Nakashima	Tomohiro Nakayama	Yong-Ce Tu	October 18, 2020
Luffy attempts to defend against Big Mom's attack, but she sends him and Hyogoro crashing into a wall. They both survive, but Hyogoro is injured. Hyogoro tells Luffy that he has the potential to use a higher grade of advance Armament Haki, which not only allows someone to emit Haki, but also flow it into a targets body and destroy it from the inside out. Big Mom then to continues to attack Luffy, chasing him around the Prisoner Mines. Queen regains consciousness and he comes up with a plan to take down Big Mom. Knowing the Prison Mine is design in a circle, Queen sets a trap for when she loops around. Once Luffy and Big Mom return to where they started, Big Mom is distracted by the empty oshiruko pot as Queen uses a dive bomb attack in his brachiosaurus form and strikes her in the head. The attack appears to have failed, but the pain from it causes Big Mom to regains her memories.
947	56	"Brutal Ammunition! The Plague Rounds Aim at Luffy!"; Transliteration: "Saikyō Heiki! Rufi o Nerau Ekisaito Dan" (Japanese: 最凶兵器！ルフィを狙う疫災弾)	Directed by : Takuhito Satō; Storyboarded by : Akitaro Daichi	Ryo Yamazaki	Ippei Masui & Kaon'nuri	October 25, 2020
Right after Big Mom regains her memories, she suddenly falls asleep. Queen quickly orders his men to restrain Big Mom and escorts her to Onigashima. With both Queen and Big Mom away, Luffy continues practicing with advanced Armament Haki. Babanuki then orders the prisoners to subdue Luffy, and they comply out of fear. Daifugo also fires disease-filled bullets created by Queen on the prisoners. Before Luffy can be infected, Kawamatsu shouts out to Luffy telling him to become a becon of hope for the prisoners. Babanuki orders the guards to kill him, but Kawamatsu manages to fight them off by spitting sharp fishbones at their necks, saying he will not fall so easily.
948	57	"Start Fighting Back! Luffy and the Akazaya Samurai!"; Transliteration: "Hangeki Kaishi! Rufi to Akazaya no Samurai!" (Japanese: 反撃開始！ルフィと赤鞘の侍！)	Yutaka Nakashima	Shōji Yonemura	Shūichi Itō	November 1, 2020
Raizo retrieves the keys to Kawamatsu's cell as well as his sword, Soto Moto, but is confronted by Solitaire, though he is able to escape. The ninja later gives them to him and Kawamatsu frees himself and fends off the guards with both Ryuo-enhanced sumo techniques and his unique sword fighting style, Kappa Style. After Raizo, Kawamatsu, and Kiku reunite, they join up with Luffy and Hyogoro in fighting the Beast Pirates. When Kiku dons a one mask it is revealed that full name and epithet is "Kikunojo of the Lingering Snow", as well as a fact that she is actually a transgender woman. However, the Beast Pirates continue to infect prisoners with diseased Plague Rounds. Elsewhere Zoro and Hiyori walk through a leafy forest, they are attacked by one Fukurokuju's assassins, but Zoro fends him off. At sea Queen's ship takes Big Mom to Onigashima. Despite the tranquilizer shots, Big Mom wakes up briefly, asking for oshiruko, then falls back asleep. Back at Udon, Kid attempts to remove his cuffs. Raizo throws them the keys, but Kid, only having one hand, asks Killer to help him unlock the cuffs. However, Killer just lies on the ground, laughing.
949	58	"We're Here to Win! Luffy's Desperate Scream!"; Transliteration: "Kachi ni Kita! Rufi Kesshi no Sakebi" (Japanese: 勝ちに来た！ルフィ決死の叫び)	Kenichi Takeshita	Atsuhiro Tomioka	Kimitaka Itō & Toshio Deguchi	November 8, 2020
Babanuki's men continue firing Plague Rounds at the prisoners, with ehe bullet wounds form black skull marks, spreading green blotches all over the body. Prisoners affected suffer excruciating, burning pain, fever and bleeding, and eventually become emaciated and zombie-like while also being highly contagious by touch as well. Daifugo dubs the viral weapon as Queen's masterpiece, the Mummy virus. The prisoners surround Luffy and his allies, blaming them for getting infected and casting their doubts that Luffy will defeat Kaido. Luffy grabs the prisoners, infecting himself and tells them that he made a promise to make Wano a prosperous place again and prompts the prisoners to either join him and liberate the country or continue to live a life of despair under Kaidou's regime. Babanuki decides to try to kill all the prisoners at once, using a Plague Shot, a cannonball containing two hundred doses of the Mummy virus. He places it in his elephant's trunk to fire, but Luffy walks up to him and ties a knot in the elephant's trunk. With the cannonball still inside, it detonates in Babanuki's body, knocking him out. With the last of his strength, Luffy orders his new followers to take out the vice wardens. Following his orders, the prisoners turn on and defeat Daifugo and Solitaire. Eight days before the Onigashima raid, Luffy scores his first victory, liberating Udon's prisoner mine.
950	59	"Warriors' Dream! Luffy's Conquer of Udon!"; Transliteration: "Tsuwamono-domo ga Yume! Rufi Udon Seiatsu!" (Japanese: 兵どもが夢！ルフィ兎丼制圧！)	Yasunori Koyama	Akiko Inoue	Masahiro Shimanuki	November 15, 2020
After Udon is conquered, a collapsed Luffy asks Kid if he wants join the fight against Kaido, but Kid rejects his offer, having lost trust in alliances after Hawkins' and Apoo's betrayal. Kid then uses his Devil Fruit power to create a new prosthetic arm out of magnetic parts and leaves Udon with Killer to find the rest of his crew. Elsewhere, Ashura Doji reveals to Kin'emon and Dogstorm that ten years ago, he had comrades who were too impatient to wait for the Kozuki Family to return and word "sunacchi"; it was an abbreviation of the sentence, "Namae o sutero, chie o sutero." ("Throw away your name and your wits.") The phrase suggesting not worrying about the dangers and throwing themselves forward for their cause. Against Ashura's command, they sailed out to Onigashima. Ashura he warned, the soldiers were decimated by Kaido's crew and died in vain, after which they were buried at the graveyard. Back at present day, Doji and his men decide to join Kin'emon's alliance to take down Kaido. After finding out that Luffy is a pirate, the prisoners distrust him, while also having doubts of the prophecy and that the Akazaya Nine truly returned from the past. Momonosuke hides with Luffy, who is resting in a cell while Chopper prepares a cure. Although Momonosuke is hesitant to appear in front of them, Luffy throws a boulder at him to chase him out into the open. Momonosuke is spotted by the prisoners and immediately recognized. The prisoners bow down to him and Momonosuke gives a speech calling them to help fight against Kaido. Now convinced that the Akazaya Nine truly have returned, they join the cause to liberate the Land of Wano.
951	60	"Orochi's Hunting Party! The Ninja Group vs. Zoro!"; Transliteration: "Orochi no Otte! Ninja Gundan tai Zoro" (Japanese: オロチの追手！忍者軍団VSゾロ)	Satoshi Itō	Shinzō Fujita	Masayuki Takagi	November 22, 2020
Zoro and Hiyori have an encounter with the ninja Fujin and several ninjas that serve Orochi. After defeating the ninjas, Zoro plans to get Shusui back to prepare for the Onigashima raid. Orochi berates Fukurokuju for allowing Zoro to escape, but the ninja appeases him state that he managed to capture another criminal, Law, who was brutally tortured and chained to a wall. In the Flower Capital, Sanji and Shinobu find that wanted posters of the Straw Hats and their allies have been set up through the entire country. Now that most of their work in the Flower Capital is done, they decide that the next step would be to free the samurai allies who have been imprisoned by Orochi's guards. Sanji observes people creating sky ships, lantern-like balloons that are released into the sky during the Fire Festival. Back at Udon, Chopper finally creates a cure for the Mummy virus. Luffy is cured first, then the other prisoners are also. In Ebisu Town, Nami runs into Bepo, Penguin and Shachi in the streets. Bepo shows her the rebellion flyer, where Yasuie added two lines to the snake to change the rendezvous point. After Nami leaves, Bepo reveals to his crewmate what happened to Law. In exchange for his crewmates freedom, Law turned himself in, with Law telling his crewmates to not tell the Straw Hats. After being beaten, Hawkins and Drake chained him to a wall and tortured him for information.
952	61	"Tension Rises in Onigashima! Two Emperors of the Sea Meet?!"; Transliteration: "Onigashima Kinpaku! Sōgū!? Futari no Yonkō" (Japanese: 鬼ヶ島緊迫！遭遇!? 二人の四皇)	Katsumi Tokoro	Hitoshi Tanaka	Shigefumi Shingaki	November 29, 2020
Kanjuro visits Ebisu Town where he receives permission to bury Yasuie's body in Kuri as the Ninja-Pirate-Mink-Samurai Alliance continues with their preparations for the Fire Festival. At Kuri, Kin'emon is shocked to see that Ashura has gathered ships to transport the rebels in the raid. Meanwhile, Luffy keeps trying to master Ryuo with Hyogoro aiding him. Zoro returns to Oihagi Bridge along with Hiyori and he challenges Gyukimaru again to reclaim Shusui. The battle is then interrupted by Kawamatsu, who Hiyori and the thief both recognize. Big Mom has been taken to Onigashima. There she tries to recruit King to her crew, stating he's a member of one of the three races that aren't part of Totto Land, but he refuses. Kaidou arrives and orders his men to remove her handcuffs. Big Mom calls for Napoleon who has been awake all along, but remained silent while Big Mom was amnesiac due to shyness. After this, they immediately begin to battle.
953	62	"Hiyori's Confession! A Reunion at Bandit's Bridge!"; Transliteration: "Hiyori no Kokuhaku! Oihagi-bashi no Saikai" (Japanese: 日和の告白！おいはぎ橋の再会)	Directed by : Ryōsuke Tanaka; Storyboarded by : Yutaka Nakashima	Tomohiro Nakayama	Keita Saitō	December 6, 2020
At Onigashima, Kaido and Big Mom continue with their clash. Queen contacts Udon, and Babanuki, having been tamed by Tama, gives Queen a false report. Back at Udon, Hyogoro becomes reacquainted with the other yakuza leaders, Omasa of Udon, Tsunagoro of Hakumai, Cho of Ringo and Yatappe of Kibi, who all agree to join the rebellion. Meanwhile, in Kibi, Kin'emon finds out that Ashura has acquired the blueprints for Kaidou's mansion. He receives news from Raizo that they have amassed an army of 3500 men. The only remaining problem is that they do not have a supply of weapons for them, as possession of weapons was forbidden in the country. At Oihagi Bridge, Hiyori and Kawamatsu have a heartfelt reunion, as Hiyori confesses that she run away out of fear for Kawamatsu's health, as he always gave her whatever food they had. The reunion is cut short as a group of Beast Pirates arrives, seeking revenge on Gyukimaru for stealing weapons from them. Zoro and Kawamatsu defeat the attackers, and Gyukimaru flees the scene with Zoro chasing after him.
954	63	"Its Name is Enma! Oden's Great Swords!"; Transliteration: "Sono Na wa Enma! Oden no Meitō!" (Japanese: その名は閻魔！おでんの名刀！)	Kōhei Kureta	Tomohiro Nakayama	Kazuya Hisada	December 13, 2020
Kawamatsu rekindles his bond with Hiyori whilst Zoro chases after Gyukimaru. Kawamatsu explains that in Ringo, people are given a sword at birth which they keep for their entire life. When they die their swords are used as grave markers for their Eternal Graves. He also tells her that thirteen years ago, after she ran away, he spent some time robbing and storing swords from the Eternal Graves in Ringo after befriending Onimaru, a komagitsunea (a fox with flame-like mane and tail) who was once the companion of Shimotsuki Ushimaru, the late damiyo of Ringo. During his time guarding the graves he came up with the alias, "Gyukimaru". This went on until he was captured trying to steal food and was sent to Udon. Hiyori feels it isn't a coincidence that a man named Gyukimaru is doing the exact same thing Kawamatsu did. Kawamatsu contacts Kin'emon to reveal that he can supply the alliance with the stored weapons. Meanwhile, Gyukimaru reveals himself to be Onimaru in a human form. Hiyori then offers to trade Zoro's Shushui with enma, a sword that belonged to Kozuki Oden and the only blade that injured Kaido.
955	64	"A New Alliance?! Kaido's Army Gathers!"; Transliteration: "Arata na Dōmei!? Kaidō-gun Dai Shūketsu" (Japanese: 新たな同盟!? カイドウ軍大集結)	Tasuku Shimaya	Shōji Yonemura	Kenji Yokoyama	December 20, 2020
At the secret place where Kawamatsu stored weapons, Hiyori explains to Zoro that before he died, Oden gave his two swords to his children, Ame No Hebakiri to Momonosuke, and Enma to Hiyori. Zoro agrees to return Shusui in exchange for Enma, while also being allowed to visit Ryuma's gravesite. At the Flower Capital's Public Cells, Law subdues Hawkins. When Law interrogates him about the alliance he had with Kid and Appo, Hawkins reveals that Apoo was allied with Kaido all along, and when he met face-to-face with Kaido, Hawkins, knowing he wouldn't survived if he tried to fight or escape, immediately submitted to him. However, Kid refused to join Kaido, was defeated, and was sent to the Udon prisoner mine while his crew was forced to work under Orochi under threat of their captain's death. Finishing the story, Law cuts Hawkins down and walks free from the prison with help from an unknown individual. As the day of the Fire Festival draws closer, the Ninja-Pirate-Mink-Samurai Alliance continues with their preparations for the raid on Onigashima. Kin'emon explains the change in the rebellion flyer. The original snake symbol implied Habu Port in Hakumai, but with the two added strokes the snake resembles a lizard, implying Tokage Port in Udon. Apoo returns to Wano, entering via a hidden tunnel behind the waterfall and riding up a gondola. He arrives with a group of gigantic horned beings known as the Numbers. At Onigashima, Kaido and Big Mom decide to put aside their feud and form an alliance to conquer the world.
956	65	"Ticking Down to the Great Battle! The Straw Hats Go into Combat Mode!"; Transliteration: "Semaru Kessen! Mugiwara Ichimi Sentō Taisei" (Japanese: 迫る決戦！麦わら一味戦闘態勢)	Directed by : Nanami Michibata; Storyboarded by : Tatsuya Nagamine	Akiko Inoue	Midori Matsuda & Toshio Deguchi	December 27, 2020
Hiyori parts ways with Zoro and Kawamatsu, and the two later inform Momonosuke and the Akazaya Nine with him of her survival. Hitetsu presents Ame No Hebakiri and Enma to the group, with Momonosuke asking Hitetsu to hold on to Ame No Hebakiri, as he's hesitant to wield his farther's blade. Zoro receives Enma and tries out his new sword on a tree, but the sword ends up drawing more Haki than necessary, creating an overly-powerful slash cutting off a piece of a nearby cliff as his crewmates quickly become worried as the sword draws significant quantities of Armament Haki from his arm causing it to shrivel. However, Zoro manages to bring the Haki back into his arm. Hitetsu explains that the Enma is considered impossible to wield because it always uses excessive amounts of the wielder's Haki. Still, Zoro to keep the blade. Luffy continues training his Armament Haki and Zoro trains with his new sword. Momonosuke tells Zoro while they are training that he was told not to say the word "Sunacchi", and Zoro tells him that he picked it up after hearing the old man in his home village using it, while admitting to never using the phrase himself. Meanwhile, the Ninja-Pirate-Mink-Samurai Alliance adds more numbers to their cause and finish up with their preparations. On the day before the Fire Festival, Momonosuke and his group of retainers march to the rendezvous point to meet up with their allies. The Straw Hats stay behind by Yasuie and Pedro's graves. Hitetsu seems amazed that Zoro is managing to tame the Enma. He reveals that he was the one who crafted Sandai Kitetsu and that the reason Zoro can use Oden's sword is because the Wado Ichimonji and Enma were created by the same person, Shimotsuki Kouzaburou. Zoro states that he will turn Enma into a Black Blade. Back at Udon, Babanuki calls Orochi and lies to him, stating that there was no trouble at Udon and the situation is under control. However, Orochi somehow reveals that he has the new information about the rendezvous point change and that Hiyori was alive. Luffy finally masters Ryuo, demonstrating his new skills by blasting a tree as the curtains close on the Land of Wano Arc's second act.
957	66	"Big News! An Incident That Will Affect the Seven Warlords!"; Transliteration: "Biggu Nyūsu! Shichibukai o Osou Jiken" (Japanese: 大ニュース！七武海を襲う事件)	Megumi Ishitani	Shinzō Fujita	Eisaku Inoue & Kimitaka Itō	January 10, 2021
After the Levely concludes, Neptune's family returns to Fish-Man Island accompanied by Garp, where he laments the tense and violent arguments that occurred during the Levely. However, Garp brings up a certain incident that occurred concerning Arabasta. Previously, news of the incident were spread by Morgans. Morgans was threatened by a Cipher Pol agent to keep the incident private, but Morgans refuses, beating the agent. However, as he has the World Economy Newspaper headquarters move to a new location, he receives a call from Wapol. Big news concerning Sabo spreads throughout the world. Those who knew Sabo become distressed after reading the news about him. Koby conntacts Drake, who's secretly the captain of the Navy's Top Secret Special Force, "SWORD", and they have a private conversation via transponder snail. Drake informs Koby about the newly formed alliance between Kaido and Big Mom and the recent presence of CP-0 in the Land of Wano. Thanks to the efforts of Nefertari Cobra and Riku Doldo III, the Seven Warlords of the Sea have been abolished, which results in the Marines pursuing the former members. Buggy, Edward Weevil, Dracule Mihawk and Boa Hancock are surrounded by Marine soldiers, their legal immunity being revoked. The former warlords prepare to battle the Marines, except for Buggy who plans to flee while his underlings keep the Marines busy.
958	67	"A Legendary Battle! Garp and Roger!"; Transliteration: "Densetsu no Tatakai! Gāpu to Rojā" (Japanese: 伝説の戦い！ガープとロジャー)	Directed by : Hikaru Takeuchi; Storyboarded by : Yutaka Nakashima	Hitoshi Tanaka	Ippei Masui	January 17, 2021
At the new Marine Headquarters, the Marine officers hold a meeting where Sengoku explains the Rock Pirates and the history concerning this crew. The Rocks Pirates were a group of extremely violent pirates who even fought each other onboard the ship, but were kept under control by their captain, Rocks D. Xebec, who sought world conquest and was considered as Gol D. Roger's fist and greatest enemy. Among the crew were some of the most dangerous pirates today, including Whitebeard, Kaidou, Big Mom and Shiki. However, 38 years ago in what would be known as the God Valley Incident, Garp joined forces with the Roger Pirates and defeated the Rocks Pirates, protecting endangered World Nobles. Since the incident, the World Government attempted to remove all traces of the incident, erasing Rocks' name from history and removing the island of God Valley from all maps. Strangely, both Roger and Rocks have the mysterious initial D in their name. It is also revealed that the main reason Garp has refused a promotion to admiral several times is because he does not want to become a direct subordinate of the World Nobles while his achievements kept him from being fired for insubordination. Brannew then reveals the bounty of each of the current Emperors as well as Gol D. Roger and Edward Newgate, which are all in the billions, with Whitebeard's bounty of over 5 billion and Roger's being over 5.5 billion, the highest bounties for a pirate in history. Sakazuki declares that the Marines will not go to the Land of Wano due to a lack of manpower and resources and Sengoku talks about Kozuki Oden, saying he was not only a commander of the Whitebeard Pirates, but also sailed with Roger on his last voyage.
959	68	"The Rendezvous Port! The Land of Wano Act Three Begins!"; Transliteration: "Yakusoku no Minato! Wano Kuni-hen Daisanmaku Kaimaku" (Japanese: 約束の港！ワノ国編第三幕開幕)	Yusuke Suzuki	Tomohiro Nakayama	Shūichi Itō	January 24, 2021
Orochi and his men heads to Onigashima after departing from Tabu Port on the day of the Fire Festival. Meanwhile, Kin'emon and the other samurai wait for their allies at Tokage Port, who have not arrived due to an incident orchestrated by Orochi the day before. Two days ago, as everyone prepares it is noted that a full moon that would be present during the final battle, meaning the minks could use Sulong. Meanwhile, Luffy wonders why Jinbe hasn't arrived yet despite Big Mom being in Wano, though Zoro assures him the fishman will appear. In Okobore Town, the citizens were confronted by Holedem, as the Paradise Farm was still being stolen from despite him burning down the Mt. Atama Thieves' hideout. Tsuru, having deduced of her husband's and his allies return, offers to show Holdem where the food is to distract them. However, the other citizens stopped her by claiming aloud that they had eaten the stolen food, shocking her and angering Holedem. Back in the present, the Akazaya lose hope that their allies will come and decides to head to Onigashima alone, despite Momonosuke's and Shinobu's pleas and protests.
960	69	"The Number-One Samurai in the Land of Wano! Here comes Kozuki Oden!"; Transliteration: "Wano Kuni Ichi no Samurai! Kōzuki Oden Tōjō" (Japanese: ワノ国一の侍！光月おでん登場)	Aya Komaki	Shōji Yonemura	Masayuki Takagi	January 31, 2021
It is revealed that Orochi had the Beast Pirates bomb the Thousand Sunny and destroy bridges to cut off routes to Tokage Port. At the port, the Akazaya Nine prepare to continue with the raid on their own, knowing they'll never get the opportunity again as it is revealed that the Beast Pirates have burned down Okobore Town. A flashback to many years ago begins. Back then, Oden was a well-known troublemaker who constantly tried to sail away from Wano. A delinquent from a young age, Oden committed several atrocious acts, such as starting what would be known as the Harem War, where he clashed with several other samurai whose women he stole. When he turned eighteen, he was disavowed from his father, shogun Kouzuki Sukiyaki. After being caught trying to steal money from a teashop by a younger Tsuru, a younger Kin'emon takes a baby white boar from some thugs and brings it to the Flower Capital to gain money. However, a young Denjiro, a swindeler at the time, reveals to Kin'emon that the boar's parent is a giant boar dubbed the Mountain God, which arrives at the capital and wreaks havoc. Having overheard them Oden asks for the baby boar saying he'll settle the matter.
961	70	"Tearfully Swearing Allegiance! Oden and Kin'emon!"; Transliteration: "Namida no Deshiiri – Oden to Kin'emon" (Japanese: 涙の弟子入り おでんと錦えもん)	Toshinori Fukuzawa	Ryo Yamazaki	Yūsuke Isōchi	February 7, 2021
The Mountain God continues its rampage around town in search of its baby. Upon hearing that the Mountain God swallowed Tsurujo, Kin'emon decides to battle it head on. Despite having stabbed the beast, Kin'emon is knocked back into the ground and defeated. Oden then appears and faces the Mountain God, slicing the beast cleanly in half with a single dual-sword slash. Although there were no casualties from the incident, a quarter of the town was destroyed by the Mountain God. When Kin'emon's tries to confess his guilt over incident, Oden knocks him out and takes the blame before he receives the notice of disavowal from his father and is expelled from the capital. Due to their admiration for Oden, Kin'emon and Denjiro decide to follow him. Oden stays at Hakumai and meets the region's daimyo, Yasuie, and his servant, Orochi. After Oden leaves to travel to across Wano and eventually to Kuri. Afterwards it discovered that the room Oden stayed in is absolutely destroyed. When it is also revealed that Yasuie's money has been stolen, Orochi steps forward and claims to have witnessed Oden take it. While the Daimyo's staff quickly believe the young servant, Yasuie himself is suspicious, knowing that Oden would have made more of a spectacle of the matter. As he, Kin'emon and Denjiro travel, Oden is also joined by others. In Ringo they are joined by Kikunojo and her older brother Izo (the future 16th division commander of the Whitebeard Pirates) who were sons of a dancing instructor, but their family had recently been split due to the father being jailed for a crime, forcing them to dance in the snow for money. In Kibi they met Kanjuro, who stole hair from the living and the dead to make brushes to sell for a living. In Udon, they met Raizo, who had quit the Kouzuki Clan's Oniwabanshu after a female ninja had turned him down, who begged to join Oden, no longer wanting to live in the shadows. Oden eventually arrives at Kuri and prepares to fight the bandits there, including Ashura Doji.
962	71	"Changing Destiny! The Whitebeard Pirates Cast Ashore!"; Transliteration: "Ugoku Unmei Hyōchaku! Shirohige Kaizokudan!" (Japanese: 動く運命 漂着！白ひげ海賊団！)	Yasunori Koyama	Atsuhiro Tomioka	Masahiro Shimanuki	February 14, 2021
Oden defeats Ashura Doji and his bandits and earns the title of the Daimyo of Kuri with Sukiyaki repealing his disavowal and accepts him as his son again. After taking his followers as his official retainers he spends years rebuilding the lawless land and eventually rescues and nurtures Cat Viper, Dogstorm, and Kawatmatsu, who's revealed to be a fishman, but goes as a kappa to escape his kind's persecution after his mother's death from it. When Oden was having financial trouble due to him constantly lending money to Orochi, his retainers decide to steal from Yasuie but are caught. Yasuie then decides to give gold to Oden's retainers to let them train and become worthy samurai. Oden and his retainers become distinguished legends in Wano, and Kozuki Sukiyaki is proud of Oden's accomplishments. Meanwhile, the Whitebeard Pirates cast ashore the beaches of Wano.
963	72	"Oden's Determination! Whitebeard's Test!"; Transliteration: "Oden no Ketsui! Shirohige no Shiren!" (Japanese: おでんの決意！白ひげの試練！)	Satoshi Itō	Akiko Inoue	Shigefumi Shingaki & Yong-Ce Tu	February 21, 2021
Kozuki Oden's dreams to leave Wano leads him directly to Whitebeard after he learns of the pirate's arrival. After a brief battle, Oden begs Whitebeard to let him join his crew. Whitebeard denies his request due to concerns about Oden's character of not the kind of person to follow someone else, saying that this was an issue in his old crew. Once their ship is repaired, the Whitebeard Pirates leave at night to avoid Oden's advances, but he catches up anyway, attaching a chain to the ship and riding with through the ocean with Izo, who tried to prevent his lord from leaving. Marco saves Izo and brings him onto the Moby Dick where he is tied up. Whitebeard tells Oden that if he holds on for three days, he can join the crew. Three days have passed, and Oden only has an hour left before he can join the crew. However, after hearing the screams of Amatsuki Toki, Oden lets go of the chain to save her life. After scaring away Toki's pursuers with his swollen and brusied caused by being dragged around the sea, Oden collapses.
964	73	"Whitebeard's Little Brother! Oden's Great Adventure!"; Transliteration: "Shirohige no Otōto! Oden no Dai Bōken!" (Japanese: 白ひげの弟！おでんの大冒険！)	Yutaka Nakashima	Shinzō Fujita	Toshio Deguchi & Keita Saitō	February 28, 2021
Toki tends to Oden after he rescued her from the kidnappers. On the next day, Toki explains that she dreams of going to the Land of Wano, and when she asks if Oden could take her there, he replies with an annoyed look. They are then confronted by the kidnappers and their leader, Karma. Whitebeard intervenes and knocks out Karma. Whitebeard accepts Oden into his crew because of his selflessness, taling him on as a sworn youger brother. Toki, Izo, and the stowaways Dogstorm and Cat Viper become part of Whitebeard's crew as well. Oden travels to various places and has many eventful experiences. Over the course of their travels, Oden and Toki grow closer and eventually on the second year of Oden's journey, they have a son together and the infant is given the name Kozuki Momonosuke. Back at Wano Country, the shogun Sukiyaki falls critically ill and had to select an heir. Since Oden was absent, he decided to appoint Kurozumi Orochi as his proxy. During the crew's travels, Whitebeard creates five divisions, appointing Oden as the commander of the second, much to his dismay. The next morning, sun shining, they are haggled by Teach as a child orphan to join their crew. With that being a soft spot for Whitebeard, he lets the child onboard. Meanwhile, the Roger Pirates were informed about a new samurai from Wano working under Whitebeard. Roger decides that he wanted to meet the samurai himself.
965	74	"Crossing Swords! Roger and Whitebeard!"; Transliteration: "Majieru Yaiba! Rojā to Shirohige!" (Japanese: 交える刃！ロジャーと白ひげ！)	Kenichi Takeshita	Hitoshi Tanaka	Kazuya Hisada	March 7, 2021
Orochi became Oden's proxy as he was at sea, but the other daimyos suspect him because he was a member of the Kurozumi Family. It is revealed that before Sukiyaki was born Orochi's grandfather had attempted to take over by assassinating the other daimyos. When assassination plot was exposed, Orochi's grandfather was forced to commit seppuku, and the people grew to despise the Kurozumi name to the point lynch mobs were formed to hunt down any members. While hiding from the mobs one day, Orochi met his distant relatives Semimaru and Higurashi, the latter being a former user of the Clone-Clone Fruit. After being told of his family history and being given Snake-Snake Fruit, Model: Yamata no Orochi, Orochi plots to take the shogunate with Higurashi's assistance. Orochi needed to collect funding to buy weapons, so he stole money from Yasuie while working undercover as a servant and asked Oden for loans without paying him back. Higurashi then disguised herself as Oden to convince the shogun to let Orochi into the palace, where he became the shogun's faithful servant. Years later, Higurashi disguised herself as Sukiyaki, pretended to fall ill and spread news that Sukiyaki died of the illness, allowing Orochi to rise to power. Overseas, Oden on his fourth year under the Whitebeard Pirates, along with Toki had another child, their daughter Hiyori. One day, the Whitebeard Pirates approach an island being plundered the Roger Pirates. Oden charges in to face them, but Roger sends the samurai flying though several trees with a single swing of his sword. Oden quickly recovers and tries to return to Roger, but Whitebeard then comes and engages in a monstrous clash with the pirate, the force of their power so great, it blows back everything on the island without their blades even touching.
966	75	"Roger's Wish! A New Journey!"; Transliteration: "Rojā no Negai! Arata na Tabidachi" (Japanese: ロジャーの願い！新たな旅立ち)	Tasuku Shimaya	Tomohiro Nakayama	Eisaku Inoue & Kimitaka Itō	March 21, 2021
After three days of battle between the Roger Pirates and the Whitebeard Pirates, a ceasefire was called and on the fourth day the two crews began a gift exchange. During the exchange, Buggy becomes wary of Teach, telling Shanks that he heard that Teach had never slept in his life, including during the ceasefire the last couple of nights. Roger meets with Whitebeard and Oden, amazed that Oden could read a Poneglyph. Roger originally thought that he had reached the end of the Grand Line on Lodestar Island, but since his Log Pose stopped working on the island, he deduced that there was a final island after that. He heard that the location of the final island was written in the Poneglyphs. Roger then says something unheard that completely shocks Oden before asking to borrow Oden for a year to reach the final island. Whitebeard originally refused, but Oden agreed, determined to find the final island of the Grand Line. He decides to part ways with Whitebeard and join the Roger Pirates with Toki and their children, while Izou, having grown fond of them, decides to stay with the Whitebeard Pirates, while Dogstorm and Cat Viper end up sneaking onboard Roger's ship as stowaways.
967	76	"Devoting His Life! Roger's Adventure!"; Transliteration: "Shōgai o Kakete! Rojā no Bōken" (Japanese: 生涯をかけて！ロジャーの冒険)	Masahiro Hosoda	Shōji Yonemura	Kenji Yokoyama	March 28, 2021
While enjoying time with the crew, Oden is shocked to learn of Roger's illness and he has about a year to live. The Roger Pirates travel the Grand Line as they visit several islands. They went up a Knock Up Stream to Skypiea, and found the ancient golden city of Shandora. There they found its national treasure, the belfry bell as well as a Poneglyph. After learning about the Ancient Weapon, Poseidon, Roger has Oden etch down the message that Robin would find in twenty years. When Roger decides to look for the Road Poneglyphs Oden, Dogstorm and Cat Viper inform him that both Zou and the Land Wano has one, and Roger with already gotten a copy of another Road Poneglyph belonging to Big Mom the Roger Pirates had already located three of the four Poneglyphs needed to find the final island. They then set sail for Water 7, there they met up with Tom for ship repairs, there Oden meets a young Fanky who ignores the samurai. The Roger Pirates then stop by Tequila Wolf and Sabaody Archipelago before heading to Fishman Island. On their way down Oden hears the voices of the Sea Kings just as Roger did. At Fishman Island, the Roger Pirates are able to take a copy of a Road Poneglyph that was in the Ryugu Kingdom's Sea Forest while a young Madam Shyarly predicts that the Ancient Weapon Poseidon will be born in 10 years.
968	77	"The King of the Pirates is Born! Arriving at the Last Island!"; Transliteration: "Kaizoku Ō Tanjō – Tōtatsu! "Saigo no Shima"" (Japanese: 海賊王誕生 到達！"最後の島")	Katsumi Tokoro	Ryo Yamazaki	Shūichi Itō	April 4, 2021
Oden's adventure with the Roger Pirates led him back to his homeland of the Land of Wano, since there was a Road Poneglyph there. However, Toki falls ill from the fatigue from several years of adventure, so Oden was forced to leave her and the children in Wano, with Cat Viper and Dogstorm also deciding to stay behind. Oden was also willing to stay, but Toki insisted that Oden finish his journey with the Roger Pirates, threatening to divorce him if he doesn't. After having a brief reunion with his retainers and introducing his family to them, Oden once again leaves the Land of Wano while quickly taking a copy of the Road Poneglyph. The Roger Pirates travel to Zou to get a copy of the final Road Poneglyph needed in order to arrive at the final island. Before departing, Buggy becomes extremely ill and stays behind with Shanks taking care of him, who vows that he and Buggy will reach the final island on their own ship. When faced with the treasure on the last island, the Roger Pirates simply laugh while Roger expresses interest in the humorous tale of Joy Boy. Roger then becomes the King of the Pirates as he dubs the final island "Laugh Tale".
969	78	"To the Land of Wano! The Roger Pirates Disband!"; Transliteration: "Wano Kuni e! Rojā Kaizokudan Kaisan" (Japanese: ワノ国へ！ロジャー海賊団解散)	Directed by : Takaaki Ishiyama; Storyboarded by : Yutaka Nakashima	Atsuhiro Tomioka	Ippei Masui & Han Eunmi	April 11, 2021
After attaining everything and becoming the King of the Pirates, Roger disbands his crew. After discussing about who would surpass them, the Roger Pirates threw one last party together and Roger was the first one to leave the crew. Later, Oden returned to Wano with intentions to open its borders before Joy Boy's return and reunited with his family. The citizens were happy to see him return; he had become a celebrity since his wife helped the town after she recovered. Oden also met his retainers, except for Ashura and Denjiro. Ashura had returned to being a mountain bandit and Denjiro wandered around the country borrowing money. Kin'emon reveals to Oden what happened to the country while he was gone. Since Sukiyaki died of an illness, Orochi became the temporary shogun. Backed up by a powerful pirate, Kaido, Orochi had almost absolute power and built several weapons factories operated with slavery. After a family was executed by Orochi, the Oden's retainers protested the cruelty by going to Orochi's palace. However, while they were away, Kaido's men invaded Oden Castle and attempted to kill Momonosuke. Although the enemies were fought off, Toki was shot in the leg with an arrow protecting her child. Angry that his family was threatened and hurt by Orochi, Oden decides to confront him while the others to watch over Kuri while he is gone.
970	79	"Sad News! The Opening of the Great Pirate Era!"; Transliteration: "Kanashiki Shirase – Dai Kaizoku Jidai Makuake" (Japanese: 悲しき知らせ 大海賊時代幕開け)	Yusuke Suzuki	Akiko Inoue	Masayuki Takagi	April 18, 2021
Oden charges to the Flower Capital to confront Orochi, cutting down anyone who tries to stop him. He then tries to attack Orochi but blocked by Semimaru's Bari-Bari Fruit ability and learns that Orochi had Higurashi take Sukiyaki's appearance to make himself the next shogun. Citizens outside cheered on Oden to save the country, but they were struck with poisoned arrows that rained down from the sky before Kaido arrives at the capital in his dragon form. After his conversation with Orochi, Oden would dance in his underwear in front of the castle once a week. For this weird behaviour, the citizens started believing him to be a fool and stopped respecting him, with the children also ridiculed him. His retainers question him for answers, but Oden doesn't tell them. A year later, Oden receives a newspaper from the outside world from the shogun's messenger and learns of Roger's execution. Whitebeard, having also learned of Roger's death, thinks back to his final meeting with Roger who tells him about the Will of D. Meanwhile, Oden runs to the seacoast crying and laughing, praising Roger for the life he lived.
971	80	"Raid! Oden and the Akazaya Nine!"; Transliteration: "Uchiiri! Oden to Akazaya Kunin Otoko" (Japanese: 討ち入り！おでんと赤鞘九人男)	Yasunori Koyama	Shinzō Fujita	Masahiro Shimanuki	April 25, 2021
During the second year of Oden's return the Beast Pirates and Gecko Pirates clash against each other as someone vandalizes Ryuma's grave. Oden continues to dance, and the only people left that still support are his family, retainers, and Yasuie, as Hyogoro and his wife. Five years since Oden's return, Orochi goes back on a promise he made with Oden and reveals that he had Kaido deal with Hyogoro, those who attempted to aid Hyougoro, including his wife, were killed. This spurs Oden take action as he and his retainers, now given the name Akazaya Nine, set out to defeat Kaido. Arriving in the Udon region, Oden and the Akazaya Nine are confronted by the Beast Pirates. Wondering how and why they are prepared for them, Kaido reveals a spy must be among them. Oden questions Kaido about their promise and Kaido reveals it was a lie in order to increase their chance of victory. Oden and the Akazaya Nine charge at Kaido's subordinates and begin cutting them down. While Oden's men faced off, Toki watches over Momonosuke and Hiyori, as Yasuie, having arrived Kuri to protect Oden's family at his request, pressuress her to keep them safe at all costs.
972	81	"The End of the Battle! Oden vs. Kaido!"; Transliteration: "Ketchaku no Toki! Oden tai Kaidō!" (Japanese: 決着の時！おでんVSカイドウ！)	Directed by : Ryōsuke Tanaka; Storyboarded by : Aya Komaki	Hitoshi Tanaka	Yong-Ce Tu	May 2, 2021
Shinobu helps Oden and the Akazaya Nine in their battle as King and Queen join the fray to confront Oden's retainers. Oden confronts Kaido and is pushed back until he manages to injure him, leaving a scar. Kaido turns back into his human form and prepares to enter a final clash with Oden. However, Higurashi disguises herself as Momonosuke while a Beast Pirate held her at knifepoint distracting Oden just enough for Kaido to critically wound and defeat the off guarded samurai. Ashura and Kin'emon try to rescue Oden but are defeated as well by King and Queen. Oden and the Akazaya Nine were all jailed in the Flower Capital, with only Shinobu being spared, thanks to Oden denying allegiance to her so that she would not be arrested with the others. Three days later, Oden and the Akazaya Nine were sentenced to public execution by boiling. Just before Oden entered the pot, he suggested a wager to Orochi and Kaido: if he and his retainers could survive a set amount of time in the pot, they would be set free.
973	82	"Boiled to Death! Oden's One-hour Struggle!"; Transliteration: "Kamayude no Kei – Oden Kesshi no Ichijikan" (Japanese: 釜茹での刑 おでん決死の一時間)	Satoshi Itō	Tomohiro Nakayama	Shigefumi Shingaki	May 9, 2021
Although Orochi initially scoffs at Oden's suggestion, Kaidou accepts the challenge, agreeing to release the retainers if they survive one hour in the pot. As Oden enters the pot, already being singed by the boiling oil, his retainers run on the plank to also enter, but Oden lifts the plank up, allowing his retainers to sit safe from the boiling oil, despite their protests. Kaidou allows him to do this, since they are technically in the pot. The crowd watching the execution criticize Oden, but Shinobu stands up for him and reals the truth of Oden's burden. When he was confronted by Oden five years earlier, Orochi confessed that he only wanted to become the shogun so he could make the citizens of Wano suffer as vengeance for his family's unjust persecution at their hands. Shinobu reveals more, as she was hiding in the ceiling when it happened, Orochi had kidnapped hundreds of citizens meant as tributes to Kaido. At that point, Orochi offered Oden a bargain; Orochi would cease the kidnappings and he and Kaido would leave the Land of Wano after five years. In exchange, Oden had to dance naked in the Flower Capital every week while being humiliated by Orochi, saving 100 people from being kidnapped with each dance. Oden decided he had no choice as he couldn't face Kaido without causing a war that would result in mass casualties. The citizens are shocked by the sacrifices Oden made for them.
974	83	"Oden Wouldn't Be Oden If It Wasn't Boiled!"; Transliteration: "〝Niete Nanbo no Oden ni Sōrō〟" (Japanese: 〝煮えてなんぼのおでんに候〟)	Yutaka Nakashima	Shōji Yonemura	Keita Saitō & Toshio Deguchi	May 16, 2021
Fukurokuju confronts Shinobu for telling everyone the truth, but Shinobu denounces the Orochi Oniwabanshu and pledges loyalty to the Akazaya Nine as truth about Oden's sacrifices are spread through the public, and feeling bad for mocking him over the years, they rushed to the execution site to cheer him on, hoping for his survival. However, Oden knows that he will not survive the execution, so he tells his retainers to open up the country in his name, saying one day an important figure will appear. Oden manages to survive for over an hour, which enrages Orochi. The latter tells his men to shoot and kill Oden, breaking the promise. As ten minutes remains with Orochi becoming increasingly frustrated that Oden had not yet died. Through pure willpower, Oden pushes through the final ten minutes and completes the challenge. Despite this, Orochi decides to break his promises, and the firing squad point their guns on Oden anyway. After telling his retainers to open up the country for him, he throws the plank away from the execution area, allowing his retainers to flee to Kuri. They remembered their happy times with Oden as they tearfully ran away. Kaido mentions to Oden that he killed Higurashi for interfering with their fight, but then takes out his pistol and shots Oden in the head. Oden's final words, "Oden wouldn't be oden," is cut off, but the townspeople complete his sentence with, "if it wasn't boiled." as he dies with a smile.
975	84	"The Castle on Fire! The Fate of the Kozuki Clan!"; Transliteration: "Moeru Shiro! Kōzuki no Ichizoku no Unmei!" (Japanese: 燃える城！光月の一族の運命！)	Katsumi Tokoro	Ryo Yamazaki	Kazuya Hisada	May 23, 2021
News of Oden's death spread to Toki, who reflected on her final moments with Oden. Before he left to confront Kaido, Oden entrusted Toki with a scroll to be opened if he died in the battle. The scroll prophesied that in twenty years, someone would arrive to save the Land of Wano. Toki then remembers her visit to Oden while he was imprisoned, where he gave her his swords to pass them on to their children. After Shinobu arrives with their weapons, the Akazaya Nine rush towards the Oden Castle to protect Momonosuke, Toki and Hiyori while being pursued by the Beast Pirates. Dogstorm and Cat Cat Viper then argue, blame each other for Oden's death which ends with them being caught by one of the Numbers. Denjiro and Ashura stay back to fend off their foes, while the rest head forward to Kuri. As Kaidou's men set Oden Castle ablaze with Toki, Momonosuke and Hiyori still inside, Kaidou enters the castle looking to kill Momonosuke, but the boy's cowardice makes him lose interest, so he flies off leaving Momonosuke to die in the mansion. Having made her choice, Toki sends Kin'emon, Kanjuro, Kikunojo, Raizo, and Momonosuke 20 years into the future and has Kawamatsu escape with Hiyori. Shortly after, at the city gate, Toki announces the prophecy given to her by Oden to the crowd before she is shot down.
976	85	"Back to the Present Day! 20 Years Later!"; Transliteration: "Futatabi Genzai! Nijū-nen no Toki o Koete" (Japanese: 再び現在！二十年の時をこえて)	Directed by : Tasuku Shimaya; Storyboarded by : Tasuku Shimaya & Yutaka Nakashima	Atsuhiro Tomioka	Eisaku Inoue & Kimitaka Itō	May 30, 2021
Orochi frustration grows over the fact Oden's retainers had not been caught. Meanwhile, Oden's remaining followers were devastated by the deaths. Ashura, who survived the encounter in the forest with injuries, reflected on the prophecy given by Toki just before her death. Kawamatsu attempted to cheer up a grieving Hiyori, but to no avail.Denjiro had a meltdown while hidden in a secluded wooden cabin. In the end, this transformed him into a cold and cynical person under the new name, Kyoshiro. He created a new yakuza group and very begrudgingly pledged allegiance to Orochi to work undercover. It is also revealed that Denjiro is also "Ushimitsu Kozo" who steals money from the Capital and distributes it to the poor. After running away from Kawamatsu, Hiyori meets Denjiro and agrees to take on the alias "Komurasaki" for the next 20 years, instructing to carry fake blood at all times so she could fake her death when needed. A few months before the present day, Orochi receives a letter from a Kurozumi spy that informs him about the return of the Akazaya Nine sent through time. When Kaido questions the spy's credibility, Orochi explains the spy is a member of the Kurozumi Family. He was originally part of a theatre troupe but his parents were killed in front of him by a lynch mob. The spy met with Orochi and Higurashi, who tasked him with working undercover as one of Oden's retainers while giving a Devil Fruit. The narrator then recounts the trails the retainers who were transported to the future endured, their separation, their meeting with the Straw Hats Pirates and the struggles with them though Punk Hazard, Dressrosa, Zou and Wano as Luffy leads a group of samurai to the rendezvous.
977	86	"The Sea Is For Pirates! Raid! To Onigashima!"; Transliteration: "Umi wa Kaizoku! Uchiiri! Iza Onigashima" (Japanese: 海は海賊！討入り！いざ鬼ヶ島)	Masahiro Hosoda	Akiko Inoue	Kenji Yokoyama	June 6, 2021
No allies have to come to aid the raid on Onigashima so the Akazaya Nine jump on a rowboat to go to Onigashima. Kikunojo deduces that there must be a traitor amongst them. Kin'emon struggles to accept that one of his friends betrayed them, Kanjuro coldly confesses that he is the traitor. He claims that while he had no ill will towards them, the persona of Oden's loyal retainer was just a role given to him to him by Orochi after witnessing his parents murder, revealing himself as a member of the Kurozumi Family. He reveals he was responsible not only for leaking Oden's plan to attack Kaido 20 years ago, but also for Jack finding Zou and leaking information about the raid to Orochi, just three Beast Pirate ships come to attack them. Kin'emon cuts down Kanjuro, only to reveal that it is only a drawing of him made by his Devil Fruit. The real Kanjuro is still at the port where he restrains Shinobu with drawn snakes and captures Momonosuke. As the Beast Pirates bombard the Akazaya's boat with cannonballs, their ships are attacked as the Thousand Sunny emerges from the high waves. Meanwhile, the Akazaya's boat is lifted from the water by the Polar Tang with Law scolding the samurai for underestimating the sea. Another of the Beast Pirates' ship is attacked on the other side by the Kid Pirates' ship, the Victoria Punk. Kid states he is only there to take down Kaido, also commenting that the rebels and their ships are at another port. As Luffy, Law and Kid prepare for battle, Luffy tells the samurai, that the sea is meant for pirates.
978	87	"The Worst Generation Charges in! The Battle of the Stormy Sea!"; Transliteration: "Saiaku no Sedai Shingeki! Arashi no Umi no Tatakai" (Japanese: 最悪の世代進撃！嵐の海の戦い)	Kōhei Kureta	Shinzō Fujita	Shūichi Itō & Midori Matsuda	June 13, 2021
A naval battle between the Beast Pirates and the alliance ensues. It is revealed that the Thousand Sunny withstood the bombing attacks the day before thanks to being made made from the wood of the Treasure Tree Adam, which surprises the Gifters. When the Straw Hats ask where their allies are, Kin'emon tearfully tells them of the plans being leaked The Gifters then reveal how they prevented the rest of the allies from reaching Tokage Port; they bombed the ships docked at the port, as well as all connecting bridges. The Gifters also reveal that the Beast Pirates have formed an alliance with the Big Mom Pirates. Feeling satisfied, they decided to keep firing their cannons. Luffy, Law and Kid board the enemy ship, but disagree over who should destroy the ship. The three captains together go on to destroy the ship in an attempt to assert dominance over one another. Meanwhile, Kyoshiro arrives and destroys one of the Beast Pirate ships much to everyone's surprise.
979	88	"Good Luck?! Leader Kin'emon's Plot!"; Transliteration: "Kyōun!? Rīdā Kin'emon no Ikkei" (Japanese: 強運!? リーダー錦えもんの一計)	Directed by : Toshihiro Maeya; Storyboarded by : Toshinori Fukuzawa	Hitoshi Tanaka	Shinichi Suzuki & Song Hyeonjy	June 20, 2021
After destroying the Beast Pirates' ships, Kyoshiro removes his fake pompadour and reveals his real identity as Denjiro. He then reveals that he freed 1000 prisoners from the Flower Capital, all of whom were willing to join the alliance, along with his 200 yakuza members. Then, Denjiro explains the new flyer given by Yasuie. What the lines really meant was to remove the middle syllables of "Habuminato" (Habu Port), getting "Hato" (wharf). The correct rendezvous point was at the wharf of Habu Port all along. Furthermore, although Orochi bombed the connecting bridges between regions, the allied forces had already crossed the bridge before then, due to Orochi misjudging the distance between locations and waited too long to act. Their ships were safely hidden away at the Habu wharf, while the ones destroyed at Itachi Port were the ones left behind. The other samurai arrive and with the men Denjiro brought, the Ninja-Pirate-Mink-Samurai Alliance numbers now stand at 5400 strong. Denjiro commends Kin'emon for cleverly misinforming the other Akazaya to mislead the spy Kanjuro, unaware that Kin'emon had actually misunderstood the message himself, something the other Akazaya members realize. Kanjuro laments having let the alliance get away but attempts to escape with Momonosuke by drawing a crane, which is surprisingly good, revealing him being a bad artist was also a lie. Kawamatsu swims back to shore to confront Kanjuro, but he manages to flee, flying away with Momonosuke. As Luffy and Kid sink another enemy ship, they see them flying away
980	89	"A Tearful Promise! The Kidnapped Momonosuke!"; Transliteration: "Namida no Yakusoku! Sarawareta Momonosuke" (Japanese: 涙の約束！さらわれたモモの助)	Kenichi Takeshita	Tomohiro Nakayama	Masayuki Takagi & Eisaku Inoue	June 27, 2021
As Kawamatsu frees Shinobu from the drawn snakes, the Straw Hats become enraged from learning of Kanjuro's betrayal. After clashing with Usopp and Sanji, Kanjuro uses his hair to create an ink cloud which rains arrows of ink below the allies striking the alliance their ships. Momonosuke is initially overcome with fear, but when he remembers Luffy encouraging him back in Zou, Momonosuke tells his allies to continue the fight, while he escapes on his own but internally doubts it. Hearing this, Luffy brings on how Momonosuke is crying (with the Samurai being angered by his audacity) but Luffy promises to save him no matter what. The Beast Pirates start attacking the samurai's ships from a distance with long-range cannons, sinking several. Suddenly, the Beast Pirates' attacking ship is destroyed by a piercing bursts of water, and much to the Straw Hats' excitement (and to Law's and Kid's confoundment) the one who attacked the ship is Jimbei who has finally arrived in Wano to join the Straw Hat Pirates as their official helmsmen.
981	90	"A New Member! 'First Son of the Sea' Jimbei!"; Transliteration: "Arata na Nakama! Kaikyō no Jinbē!" (Japanese: 新たな仲間！海侠のジンベエ！)	Yusuke Suzuki	Shōji Yonemura	Masahiro Shimanuki & Shigenori Taniguchi	July 4, 2021
The Straw Hats are happy to welcome Jinbe into their crew. Luffy decides to have a celebratory drink for Jinbe joining the crew, but there is no alcohol, though Zoro can smell some coming from Onigashima's direction as the allied fleet starts to near Onigashima. Shishillian leads the Minks and Hyougoro leads the samurai. The allies gather in a circle on the Polar Tang and Kin'emon discusses the plan. Onigashima is an island surrounded on all sides by mountains except for a single passage at the front, which is guarded at a torii gate. The castle, shaped like a skull, has a back entrance that could be entered, being less heavily-guarded than the front entrance. The allies would enter the front gate, use the mountain paths to reach the back entrance, and crash Kaidou's banquet to assassinate him. When Denjiro, overestimating Kin'emon strategic skills, comments on what he believes to be a decoy plan's foolishness, Law proposes a better plan. Luffy and Kid would burst through the front gate as decoys. A second decoy would be sent around the mountain paths to the back entrance. The other allies would sneak in by water with the Polor Tang, then be teleported into the island with Law's ability. Kin'emon and Denjiro would each lead a decoy group going around the castle. The Straw Hats stop by an enemy fortress just in front of Onigashima where the torii gate is located. Franky attachrs the Thousand Sunny's anchor to the gate before the Straw Hats set foot onto the island. All of them, except for Nami, Usopp and Chopper, decimate the enemy troops.
982	91	"Kaido's Trump Card! The Tobi Roppo Appear!"; Transliteration: "Kaidō no Kirifuda – Tobi Roppō Tōjō" (Japanese: カイドウの切り札 飛び六胞登場)	Megumi Ishitani	Ryo Yamazaki	Yong-Ce Tu & Keita Saitō	July 11, 2021
The allies continue to discuss their plans on getting past the front gate when they notice the Straw Hats are missing. They realize that they have already taken over the torii gate, despite it being heavily armed. As Kaido yells at his subordinates that he wants his son to show up at the banquet, he is informed that the Tobi Roppo have arrived and he decides to introduce them to Big Mom, only to learn she is changing into a kimono. Queen begins the Golden Kagura festivities with a musical performance with Apoo as DJ, while Orochi is confident the Akazaya Nine are now taken care of. Meanwhile, all six members the Tobi Roppo, X Drake, Page One and his older sister Ulti, Sasaki, Who's-Who and Black Maria, meet to hear their captain's request, though they all know what it is. The Straw Hats set up to toast Jimbe joining, but after the Akazaya Nine and their other allies advance on Onigashima, they decide to wait to celebrate with everyone after they defeat Kaido, Orochi and Big Mom.
983	92	"The Samurai Warriors' Earnestness! The Straw Hats Land at Onigashima!"; Transliteration: "Samurai-tachi no Honki! Ichimi Onigashima Jōriku" (Japanese: 侍たちの本気！一味鬼ヶ島上陸)	Directed by : Nanami Michibata; Storyboarded by : Yutaka Nakashima	Atsuhiro Tomioka	Toshio Deguchi & Shingo Fujisaki	July 18, 2021
Luffy and Kid race to Onigashima, with Jinbe controlling the Thousand Sunny. Meanwhile, Raizo briefs the plan. Kid and Luffy would enter through the front gate as decoys while Kin'emon and Denjiro each lead another decoy group through the mountain path. Starting the plan, Kin'emon sets sail while the Heart Pirates go underwater in their submarine. The allies enter to find Onigashima vibrantly illuminated, with the guards at a banquet and unprepared for enemy attacks. Usopp knocks out the few intoxicated guards on lookout, allowing the others to safely disembark. However, they destroy their return ships, making it impossible for them to escape if they had to. They split up into their two decoy groups Kin'emon uses his Garb-Garb ability to make everyone's clothes blend in with the Beast Pirates though warns everyone that if the disguises are damaged or removed, they will transform back into regular outfits. He then gives a speech to the samurai to take advantage of their disguises and reach the castle for the final battle.
984	93	"Luffy Goes Out of Control?! Sneaking into Kaido's Banquet!"; Transliteration: "Rufi Bōsō!? Sen'nyū Kaidō no Utage" (Japanese: ルフィ暴走!? 潜入カイドウの宴)	Yasunori Koyama	Shōji Yonemura	Shigefumi Shingaki	July 25, 2021
Although Orochi believes that the Akazaya Nine have been stopped, the raid on Onigashima officially begins. Kin'emon leads the eastern forces while Denjiro leads the southern forces up the mountain paths. Kid decides to go his own way and barge into the island head-on, and Luffy follows him with Zoro. They enter the party hall and find a raucous party being thrown. Although the Akazaya samurai are concerned, Law reassures them that it was part of the plan, as Luffy and Kid were meant to be the first decoys at the front gate. Kanjuro leads Momonosuke down a secret passageway to Orochi, but becomes lost in its maze-like tunnels while dealing with guards as they are unaware of Kanjuro being a spy, as Momonosuke sees a viable knife on the floor. As Luffy and Zoro enter the Performance Floor, the rest of the Straw Hats splits into three groups to go up the mountain pass; Franky and Brook riding the Black Rhino FR-U IV, Usopp, Nami, Chopper, Carrot and Shinobu go in Brachio Tank V, with Sanji riding on top as Robin and Jimbe decide to go by foot, the latter two unaware they are being watch by a masked figure. Ulti throws another temper tantrum in front of the Tobi Roppo before they are finally summoned by Kaido. Meanwhile, Zoro attempts to blend in with the Beast Pirates but ends up enraged when one of the partygoers mocks the impoverished people of Wano who could not afford to drink as lavishly as them. Meanwhile, Luffy also sees Beast Pirates gorging themselves on food from the Paradis Farm and mocking the people of Okobore Town while, wastefully dumping oshiruko on the floor, angering him, as he remembers when he fed Tama oshiruko, who accepted it gratefully.
985	94	"Thinking of Otama! Luffy's Furious Strike!"; Transliteration: "O-Tama e no Omoi – Rufi Ikari no Ichigeki" (Japanese: お玉への思い ルフィ怒りの一撃)	Katsumi Tokoro	Shinzō Fujita	Kazuya Hisada	August 1, 2021
As the Tobi Roppo go to see Kaido, it revealed that King was the one who summoned them in order to aid Kaido with a situation. A Headliner and flying squirrel SMILE user, Bao Huang, then appears. While going over an itinerary, she reveals that Kaidu will make a surprise announcement sometime during the party. Kaido then tasks the Tobi Roppo to find and bring back his son, Yamato, offering the one who succeeds a chance to fight a Lead Performer for their position. Meanwhile, Kid, who is in the party, attacks some of the partygoers and demands to see Kaido while Zoro also picks a fight with some of them over their wastfullness. Elsewhere, Luffy, remembering Tama's struggles, is enraged at the Beast Pirates are continually wasting oshiruko and attacks them with an Elephant Gun. The attack alerts the attention of the partygoers, who panic and retreat, Kid decides take advantage of the ruckus to advance, while Zoro cuts through a tower to reach Luffy on the live floor, causing a commotion. Zoro calls Luffy out for ruining their plans by starting a commotion this early on (with Kid's crewmate Heat retorting he is causing one himself). Luffy explains to Zoro that they spilled a pot of oshiruko, which reminds Zoro too of Tama and he agrees to help him cut them down.
986	95	"Fighting Music! An Ability That Harms Luffy!"; Transliteration: "Tatakau Myūjikku! Rufi o Osou Nōryoku!" (Japanese: 戦う音楽！ルフィを襲う能力！)	Shigeyasu Yamauchi	Hitoshi Tanaka	Majiro & LEE	August 8, 2021
Remembering Tama's joy from oshiruko for the first time in Okobore Town, Luffy explains how wasteful the partygoers were being. Zoro decides to join Luffy before they decide to escape the Performance Floor. Scratchmen Apoo notices and recognizes Luffy and Zoro and alertts Queen who watches them from above, shocked that Luffy escaped the prisoner mine. Queen realizes that Babanuki lied to him when he reported that Luffy was safely behind bars. Queen calls out to all the partygoers, announcing that he plans on eliminating a member of the Tobi Roppo and offers the soon-to-be vacant spot to the person who captures Luffy. Luffy and Zoro battle several Gifters, but Apoo intervenes and attacks them using his music-based Devil Fruit ability. Even when Luffy and Zoro remove their disguises to fight better, they are still overwhelmed. Kid decides to intervene himself, using his Devil Fruit ability to attract the metal around him to create a gigantic metallic arm that he slams into Apoo for betraying their former alliance.
987	96	"His Dream Broken?! The Trap That Lures Sanji!"; Transliteration: "Yume Yabureru!? Sanji o Izanau Wana!" (Japanese: 夢やぶれる!? サンジを誘う罠！)	Yutaka Nakashima	Tomohiro Nakayama	Kenji Yokoyama	August 15, 2021
Kid confronts Apoo about his betrayal, but Apoo fights back as Queen, shocked that Kid has also escaped from the prisoner mine, gives his men permission to kill the intruders. Then one of the Numbers, Haccha comes to interfere, with Kid noting that the Number is bigger than a giant. Kid's crewmates Heat and Wire handles Haccha while Luffy, Zoro, Kid and Killer escape the area but are again confronted by Apoo. Killer tells the others to cover their ears as he figured out that Apoo's attacks only works if the target can hear the sound waves he creates. Big Mom's crew prepare make their way up the falls, unaware of the port behind it. Chopper's group with the tank joins Kin'emon's forces up the east mountain path. Kin'emon decides to modify the plan. The group will split into another two groups; one group will enter through the side of the Skull Dome and the other through the back. This will allow them to attack Orochi and Kaidou from two angles. Meanwhile, Denjiro leads the southern forces, the rest of the Akazaya Nine are under the sea, and Robin, Jinbe, Franky and Brook infiltrate the castle in disguise. Although Kin'emon's group encounters enemy Beast Pirates, Nami and Carrot use their good looks to charm their way through. Unfortunately, Kin'emon's group finds that the island blueprints were out of date, and the castle has been expanded since it was made. The forces encounter a pond on the eastern mountain path as Sanji finds a pleasure hall owned by Black Maria, but is di finds it empty since Kaidou's subordinates have left in search of the intruders. Nami, Carrot and Shinobu decide to break away from the group to search for Momonosuke. In the live floor Apoo explains what happened to Killer. When Killer was imprisoned, Orochi offered him a chance to save his captain if he ate a SMILE fruit. Killer ate the fruit but it was defective, giving him the side effects but no ability and making him a Pleasure. Angered that his partner is being mocked, Kid almost starts another fight, but is stopped by Luffy and the others. Who's-Who decides not to intervene in the battle, instead working on tracking down Yamato before Sasaki does. He also thinks about how Queen said he would kill one of the Tobi Roppo with Who's-Who mentioning there is certain Tobi Roppo he wants to kill.
988	97	"Reinforcements Arrive! The Commander of the Whitebeard Pirates!"; Transliteration: "Engun Tōchaku! Shirohige Kaizokudan Taichō!" (Japanese: 援軍到着！白ひげ海賊団隊長！)	Tasuku Shimaya	Shōji Yonemura	Shūichi Itō	August 22, 2021
Although Luffy attempts to follow the plan, Kid and Killer continue to wreak havoc on enemy units. Meanwhile, at the eastern mountain path, Kin'emon's forces split into two groups. One group enters the castle while the other continues down the path. Chopper and Usopp in Brachio Tank V joins the group head towards the back. Most of them see Big Mom's shadow from the window and dive into the water, but she opens the window finds Chopper riding the tank.The Big Mom Pirates, led by Perospero, finally make it back up the waterfall. However, they see another flying figure, thinking it is King, only to discover it is Marco in his Human-Beast Form, who arrived to the Land of Wano to aid Luffy. Although they attack Marco, he kicks the ship back down the waterfall. Cat Viper and Izou, who have also arrived to aid the rebellion, ride up the waterfall and watch the ship falling down. Orochi meets with Kaido and discusses the samurai's plan, with Black Maria staying to attend the banquet them instead of searching for Yamato. Orochi expresses his believies that the allies have died at sea. He comments on how trusting the samurai were of Kanjuro prior to his betrayal, since he nearly died along with them in the boiling pot twenty years ago. However, Kaidou laments that Oden never told them the location of Laugh Tale. The Beast Pirates outside, unaware that Kanjuro was on their side, act hostile towards him, but they are defeated and Kanjuro enters Orochi's throne room. He brings with him an unconscious, beaten Momonosuke. Meanwhile, Page One carries Ulti down the hallway. Off the coast of Onigashima, as he Polar Tang encounters a particularly strong current, Cat Viper contacts Dogstorm to inform him that he has just finished climbing the waterfall with his subordinates, but Cat Viper hangs up before discussing how his group will reach the island. In the mansion, Zoro cuts down a wall to get to Kaido, only to find several Beast Pirates on the other side. He and Luffy fight the enemies off, but are separated. As more enemies come, Luffy decides to practice his Ryuo on them.
989	98	"The Pact Between Men! The Fierce Fighting of Brachio Tank!"; Transliteration: "Otoko no Chikai! Gekitō Burakio Tanku" (Japanese: 漢の誓い！激闘ブラキオタンク)	Kōhei Kureta	Ryo Yamazaki	Kimitaka Itō	August 29, 2021
Big Mom recognizes Chopper as a Straw Hat, forcing Chopper and Usopp attempt to flee in Brachio Tank V with Big Mom chasing after them. Kanjuro comes to Orochi with an unconscious, beaten Momonosuke. He states that Momonosuke attempted to escape by cutting the rope with the knife, but Kanjuro beat him unconscious. However, Kanjuro reports that he failed to thwart the Akazaya Nine's plans, and that the allied forces are in Onigashima. However, Fukurokuju reports that since there were no enemy ships at the port, the island was safe from enemy attacks. Still, Orochi prepares to execute Momonosuke to damage the enemy morale, Meanwhile, Marco and Cat Viper head to Onigashima with Izo also being with them. The revealed message that Marco wanted deliver to Luffy was simpliy "I'll be late, but I'll be there" as Marco states joining the raid to help avenge Oden. Denjiro leads the southern forces up the mountain path only to find the map is out-of-date, as they encounter an unmapped gate. Sasaki exits the gate, and recognizes Kyoshiro, unaware that he was Denjiro. Although Sasaki was trusting of Denjiro, Denjiro's men ambush Sasaki, tying him to a tree with Seastone chains. From there, the southern forces split up into two groups; one would enter the Skull Dome while the other continues down the path. Meanwhile, Big Mom chases Chopper and Usopp into a canyon, with Kaido's forces setting up cannons and mortars to fire at the Brachio Tank V. Although the duo destroys the cannons and mortars they are unable to harm Big Mom and once again force to flee. Since Big Mom has been lured away, Kin'emon's forces are able to safely come out of hiding. They make their advance, but Nami's group is spotted by Prometheus. Meanwhile, Ulti insists that Page One carry her down the hall, but they fall down the stairs and encounter Luffy.
990	99	"Thunder Bagua! Here Comes Kaido's Son!"; Transliteration: "Raimei Hakke! Tōjō Kaidō no Musuko" (Japanese: 雷鳴八卦！登場カイドウの息子)	Tatsuya Nagamine	Atsuhiro Tomioka	Masahiro Kitazaki & Yong-Ce Tu	September 5, 2021
A mysterious masked figure runs through the halls, excited to meet someone while being chased by the Beast Pirates who see them. They crosses through several rooms, including the one where Kid is fighting Beast Pirates. Meanwhile, Ulti checks on her brother Page One. She again throws a fit in front of him, remembering how she rode on Page One's back down the staircase. She then confronts Luffy, being told that he is a pirate intruder. They immediately clash and headbutt each other, each attempting to knock the other down. Ulti gets the upper hand and slams Luffy into the floor. She transforms into the Human-Beast form of her Dragon-Dragon Fruit, Ancient Type Model: Pachycephalosaurus while Page One transforms into his full Spinosaurus form. Although Luffy gets up, he acknowledges that he is in an Emperor's castle and fights at full strength. Eventually, Luffy grabs onto Ulti's horns and slams her into the ground, then defeats Page One with a Haki-imbued Gear Third punch. Enrage, Ulti transforms into her Beast Form, headbutting Luffy. She prepares a more powerful headbutt, but the masked figure appears and uses a kanabō to strike her down with the same move Kaido used to beat Luffy in their fight. Excited to see Luffy, the masked figure carries him away, saying he has been waiting for Luffy, before revealing himself to be Yamato, Kaidou's son.
991	100	"Enemy or Ally? Luffy and Yamato!"; Transliteration: "Teki ka? Mikata ka? Rufi to Yamato" (Japanese: 敵か？味方か？ルフィとヤマト)	Directed by : Yusuke Suzuki; Storyboarded by : Shigeyasu Yamauchi	Akiko Inoue	Toshio Deguchi & Keita Saitō	September 12, 2021
Angry that the Big Mom Pirates' ship was knocked down the waterfall twice, Perospero rides to Onigashima on his candy slug. He swears revenge on King and Marco for knocking the ship down, and Luffy for the humiliation he done to the Big Mom Pirates, as well a stating that he against his mother's idea for an alliance. The Brachio Tank V fires several rounds at Big Mom but she is unharmed by the fire. She prepares to use her Devil Fruit powers on Usopp and Chopper, but upon hearing Prometheus' calling her saying he has found Zeus, she walks away. Although the tank is unharmed, a transformation switch is activated, turning the tank into the lower half of the General Franky. Despite being worried about Nami's group, Usopp and Chopper decide they must unite it with the Kurosai FR-U IV to form the full General Franky. They believe Sanji will protect them, unaware he ran off to look for women. As Big Mom walks through the halls in search of Zeus, she creates homies with pieces of her soul. Nami, knowing she could not win in a battle against Big Mom, decides to run into the Performance Hall with Zeus to avoid her. Robin and Jinbe are among the partygoers and they spot Hyougoro, and they are glad that the samurai successfully entered the castle. Robin is harassed by a drunken Beast Pirate but she knocks him out. Then, Orochi appears on the party room balcony, showing Momonosuke tied to a cross and preparing to execute him. Kaidou is disappointed that Orochi interrupted his party, Meanwhile, Zoro is in the halls but is surrounded on both sides. He encounters a group of Gifters who confess that many of them dream about being King of the Pirates but all gave up on it before offering him a spot in the Beast Pirates. Zoro refuses and cuts the enemies down. The medical team tends to Ulti's mouth injury and helps her regain consciousness while Page One, who had no injury other than a dislocated jaw, goes to chase after Yamato. Luffy questions Yamato's motive and attacks him, who blocks Luffy's attacks. When Luffy attacks Yamato with Gum-Gum Red Hawk, it reminds him of his battle against Ace who came to Wano for Kaido's head.
992	101	"Desire to be Oden! Yamato's Dream!"; Transliteration: "Oden ni Naritai – Yamato no Omoi" (Japanese: おでんになりたい ヤマトの思い)	Directed by : Toshihiro Maeya; Storyboarded by : Yutaka Nakashima & Aya Komaki	Shinzō Fujita	Shinichi Suzuki	September 19, 2021
Deciding to trust Yamato, Luffy agrees to hear him out as Page One and the Beast Pirates attempt to locate them. Orochi prepares to execute Momonosuke to damage the enemy morale. He explains to the crowd that Momonosuke was a time traveller who was transported twenty years into the future by his mother, Toki. The crowd votes on his method of execution. Although Robin, Jinbe, Hyougoro and the other allies are unhappy to see Momonosuke on the cross, they are forced to jeer at him to blend in. At Onigashima's coast, Law's submarine approaches the back of the island, battling strong currents. When the submarine goes up to the surface, then Law uses his Devil Fruit ability to transport himself, Bepo, Penguin, Shachi onto the island. Marco also arrives, having carried Cat Viper and Izou to Onigashima. As Kikunojo has a heartfelt reunion with his brother after twenty years separated, the Heart Pirates and Akazaya members prepare to enter the castle as Marco flies off to inspect something heading to the island. Elsewhere, as Kaido feels frustrated that Yamato has not been captured yet, he decides to personally appear at the party, appearing by Momonosuke. Along with the execution, Kaido introduces a certain "New Onigashima Project." Finally in private, Luffy grants Yamato five minutes to explain himself. Yamato explains that he idolized Oden and when he was executed, Yamato proclaimed himself to be Oden. He went to Kuri and found Oden's logbook, reading about his adventures with the Whitebeard and Roger Pirates. Yamato removes his mask, revealing his face. As Yamato is actully a woman as Kaido's daughter and doesn't look masculine, Luffy is confused on why she called herself Kaido's son. Yamato says that she decided to become a man because Oden was a man, and took on Oden's name to continue his dream of opening Wano's borders. Yamato then tells Luffy that he reminds her of Ace, shocking him.
993	102	"Explosive?! The Handcuffs that Shackle Yamato's Freedom!"; Transliteration: "Bakuhatsu!? Yamato no Jiyū o Shibaru Jō!" (Japanese: 爆発!? ヤマトの自由を縛る錠！)	Masahiro Hosoda	Hitoshi Tanaka	Masayuki Takagi	September 26, 2021
Yamato tells Luffy how Ace came to Wano for Kaido's head and mentioned Luffy a lot. Yamato also admits to having wanted to join Ace's crew but couldn't. On the top of the castle, Law and his crew break away from the group to achieve their own goals. However, the remaining samurai are attacked by a headless samurai on horseback, deducing they are drawings made by Kanjuro. Kanjuro comes out of the castle door with some Beast Pirates and confronts them, revealing what happened to Momonosuke. Momonosuke attempted to escape by cutting his ropes using a knife. Although he managed to cut Kanjuro's hand, he was brutally beaten unconscious and taken to Orochi. Kanjuro finishes by announcing Momonosuke's public execution at the party. Outraged and feeling betrayed, the samurai wage a battle against Kanjuro's forces. Cat Viper has replaced his severed hand with a double-barrel gun and Dogstorm replaced his leg with a sword, so they battle fiercely against their enemies. However, Kikunojo still attempts to sympathize with Kanjuro, believing that there was still some good in him. After Kanjuro denounces the samurai for the last time, she enters the battle. Nami's group is chased by Prometheus down the halls, and are further attacked by the homies. Nami and Carrot are captured, but upon Naami's insistence, Shinobu flees to resscue Momonosuke. Zeus also attempts to intervene, but is grabbed by Big Mom's obscured hand. Back in the attic, Yamato explains that she wishes to join Luffy's crew and be free like Oden, but Kaido fitted her with shackles that would explode if she left the island, and while Yamato admits she is unsure if Kaido would kill her, he is afraid to test it. Luffy offers to remove his handcuffs for him, but they are interrupted by Kaido's speech from the Performance Floor. Kaido announces to the crowd his official alliance with the Big Mom Pirates to gather the Ancient Weapons to use against the World Government. In the hallway, Big Mom attacks Zeus before personally crashing into the party hall.
994	103	"The Akazaya Face-off! Kikunojo vs. Kanjuro!"; Transliteration: "Akazaya Ikkiuchi – Kikunojō tai Kanjūrō" (Japanese: 赤鞘一騎打ち 菊之丞VSカン十郎)	Yasunori Koyama	Tomohiro Nakayama	Masahiro Shimanuki	October 3, 2021
The alliance in the Performance Floor are shocked by Big Mom's appearance and her capture of Nami's group. She and Kaido mention the purpose of their alliance is to acquire the One Piece and Ancient Weapons to bring fear and war. He also announces a new plan: he would take full control of the country and enslave all citizens, including those in the Flower Capital. Orochi objects, arguing that the capital is the pride of the Kurozumi Family. Kaido promptly takes out his sword and decapitates him. Upon seeing Momonosuke on the cross through a crack in the ceiling, Luffy and Yamato fall through the ceiling into the party below. They go to rescue Momonosuke.. Meanwhile, Kikunojo and Kanjuro continue their battle with Kanjuro using their past against her, saying it was all an act. Accepting that the Kanjuro she knew will never return, Okiku defeats him. Kin'emon and Denjiro have reached the back of the castle and join the group, who is still hurt from Kanjuro's betrayal. Still, they decide to move forward and continue their advance. Meanwhile, Kaido gives Orochi's subordinates an ultimatum: join him or die. He also mentions turning Wano into a pirate empire for the war, relocating Onigashima to the Flower Capital and making Yamato the new shogun of New Onigashima. Angered by this news, Yamato makes a shortcut for him and Luffy to use to reach Kaido.
995	104	"Raid! Inheriting Oden's Will"; Transliteration: "Uchiiri! Uketsugu Oden no Ishi" (Japanese: 討入り！受け継ぐおでんの意志)	Satoshi Itō	Shōji Yonemura	Shigefumi Shingaki	October 10, 2021
To Hyogoro's shock and disgust, Orochi's subordinates decide to join Kaido's side and abandon their shogun. Big Mom is relieved to have this issue dealt with, and orders her homies to keep Nami and Carrot restrained. Nami places her trust in Shinobu to save Momonosuke, and as Shinobu moves stealthily through the crowd, she notes that Oden knew all along that killing Orochi would change nothing and their real enemy is Kaido. Kaidou then goes to Momonosuke, remembering when he left him in the burning castle to die. Just like twenty years ago, Kaidou demands to know Momonosuke's name, offering to cancel the execution if he turns out not to be the son of Oden. The crowd encourages Momonosuke to lie to escape the execution. Yamato and Luffy run down the hall, where Yamato hears, to her delight, that the Oden's retainers are alive. However, they are pursued by Who's-Who and Ulti. Meanwhile, Usopp and Chopper in the Brachio Tank V, on its two legs, run through a dark cave, accidentally waking up one of the Numbers. At the seas outside the island, Perospero battles against Marco, where they both express their disapproval of Kaido and Big Mom's alliance. Back at the Performance Hall, through sheer bravery, Momonosuke gives his real name to Kaidou, revealing he is a member of the Kouzuki Family and declaring himself as the future shogun of the Land of Wano, angering Kaido. Just then, Luffy uses advance Armament Haki to remove Yamato's handcuffs and they explode, revealing, to Yamato's horror, that the shackles really were explosive. Angry, Yamato denounces Kaido as her father and prepares to attack him, but Luffy stops her so that the samurai could act. Kin'emon's forces advance through the hallways and break into the platform with Kaido and the Lead Performers. CatViper strikes down Jack and Izou manages to disarm King. Shocked that the Akazaya Nine have returned like the prophecy said, Queen makes the announcement to the crowd that they are facing a full-scale raid. Together, the Akazaya Nine yell "sunacchi" before slashing Kaido, cutting him like how Oden did twenty years ago.
996	105	"Onigashima in Tumult! Luffy's All-Out War Begins!"; Transliteration: "Onigashima Gekidō – Rufi Zenmen Sensō Kaishi" (Japanese: 鬼ヶ島激動 ルフィ全面戦争開始)	Yutaka Nakashima	Ryo Yamazaki	Kazuya Hisada	October 24, 2021
As he falls, Kaidou realizes that the Akazaya Nine used Ryuo to pierce through his body. He crashes into the ground below. The Lead Performers realize that Luffy's group was only a decoy for the real invading group. Ulti confronts Yamato for striking her down earlier. Yamato officially defects from the Beasts Pirates, swearing allegiance to the Kouzuki Family, saying she doesn't care if Kaido die as she attacks the enemy Beast Pirates and battles Ulti head-on. Elsewhere, Law travels through Kaido's castle, and Who's-Who stops chasing Yamato to resolve other business. Meanwhile, Big Mom spots and approaches Luffy. Shinobu sneaks onto the balcony in an attempt to rescue Momonosuke, while Robin and Jinbe prepare to strike when needed. In the hallway, Nami and Carrot fight back against the homies, striking them with electricity and killing them all. Nami then runs after Big Mom to retrieve Zeus. Luffy and Big Mom quickly enter battle, and punch each other, but Big Mom overpowers Luffy, knocking him back. Meanwhile, Nami finds Zeus. Terrified of her, Zeus rejoins Nami. The Akazaya Nine attempt to kill Kaido by stabbing him with their swords. Kin'emon recites the prophecy given by Toki twenty years prior. They nearly succeed in killing Kaido, but he unleashes a powerful attack knocking them all back. Back on the Performance Floor, Big Mom asks Luffy why he came here, being incredulous that he seriously intends to take on Kaido. To his allies' surprise, Luffy denies it, saying he is not just there for Kaido. Kaido deduces that the samurai have allied themselves with Luffy to take him down. Kaido attempts to deceive the samurai, claiming that Luffy would betray them whenever he saw fit. Kin'emon rebukes Kaido's words as slander and refuses to back down, saying that Luffy will one day stand at the pinnacle of the seas and no matter what happens, he will remain and achieve the promise of daybreak coming back to Wano. Luffy tells Big Mom that he came to defeat all of his enemies as he declares an all-out war.
997	106	"The Battle Under the Moon! The Berserker, Sulong the Moon Lion!"; Transliteration: "Gekka no Tatakai – Kyōsenshi "Sūron"" (Japanese: 月下の戦い 狂戦士"月の獅子")	Katsumi Tokoro	Akiko Inoue	Kenji Yokoyama	October 31, 2021
War ensues in Onigashima. Big Mom and Kaido assume that the raid would be easily defeated, as Luffy only had a few hundred troops. However, Queen gets a report that there are enemies in the thousands charging into Onigashima. When the alliance, Kidd Pirates, Marco and Perospero begin to overrun Kaido's castle, Queen calls off the banquet and tells the Beast Pirates to counter the raid. Shinobu, who is hiding in the ceiling just above Momonosuke, prepares to rescue him. However, she cannot act immediately as the Lead Performers are still on the balcony. Kaido transforms into his dragon form and flies outside up to the roof with the Akazaya Nine riding on him. The Minks and Jack, Numbers member, Nangi and soldiers join their battle with the Minks transforming into their Sulong forms to clash with Jack in his mammoth form as well as Nangi and the soldiers. Cat Viper and Dogstorm then begin to transform into their Sulong forms as well.
998	107	"Zeus' Treason?! The Cornered Nami!"; Transliteration: "Zeusu no Hangyaku!? Nami Zettai Zetsumei!" (Japanese: ゼウスの反逆!? ナミ絶体絶命！)	Kenichi Takeshita	Shinzō Fujita	Shūichi Itō	November 7, 2021
Shinobu tries to rescue Momonosuke but is caught by King, who prepares to kill Momonosuke until Sanji rescues him in his Raid Suit and tosses him to Shinobu. Sanji attempts to combat King, but the Lead Performer gets the upper hand, transforming into his pteranodon form, piercing Sanji with his beak and crashing into a building. Luffy tells Yamato to protect Momonosuke while he deals with Big Mom who launches a powerful attack that Luffy dodges and almost kills Sasaki, but destroys the tree he was chained to. She then goes after Nami, who still has Zeus and retrieves him to prepare an attack and strike her down with Nami denouncing her friendship with Zeus. But Franky and Brook arrive slicing Zeus in half and Franky running over Big Mom's face with the back wheel of the Black Rhino FR-U IV, sending her to the floor.
999	108	"I'll Protect You! Yamato Meets Momonosuke!"; Transliteration: "Kimi o Mamoru – Kaikō Yamato to Momonosuke" (Japanese: 君を守る 邂逅ヤマトとモモの助)	Yusuke Suzuki	Hitoshi Tanaka	Kimitaka Itō & Toshio Deguchi	November 14, 2021
While everyone is surprised by Franky running over Big Mom, Luffy prepares to go to the roof. Usopp and Chopper try to escape from Numbers members, Jaki, Goki and Juki but to no avail. Yamato knocks Ulti away and reaches Momonosuke and Shinobu, who learn from Luffy that she is an ally. However, after he calls himself Oden, they run away. Big Mom wakes up in anger and Franky prepares to fire a Radical Beam at her but is surprised when the Numbers, arrive. Their gigantic size reminds the Straw Hats of the time they battled Oars in Thriller Bark. Big Mom explains that they were failed artificial recreations of ancient giants from Punk Hazard that were failed experiments but were purchased by Kaido. Noticing Jaki carrying the Brachio Tank V, Franky fires the Radical Beam at him. Taking advantage of the situation, Big Mom attempts to attack Franky but is stopped by Jimbei and Robin, who sends her rolling out of the castle. Franky tells Usopp and Chopper that it is time to combine while Luffy looks up at the hole to the roof, telling Kin'emon to wait for him.
1000	109	"Overwhelming Strength! The Straw Hats Come Together!"; Transliteration: "Attōteki Senryoku! Mugiwara no Ichimi Shūketsu" (Japanese: 圧倒的戦力！麦わらの一味集結)	Directed by : Kōhei Kureta; Storyboarded by : Aya Komaki & Kōhei Kureta	Shōji Yonemura	Yong-Ce Tu, Midori Matsuda & Keiichi Ichikawa	November 21, 2021
Big Mom rolls out of the castle and down the entrance steps, being spotted by Perospero. Meanwhile, Sasaki's chains are broken off by his subordinates as he swears revenge on Denjiro for betraying him. Atop the Skull Dome, Kaido and Jack's forces battle against the Minks. Although Jack fights off the Minks, Dogstorm and Cat Viper take over, transforming into their Sulong forms to face him. Inside the castle, Luffy and Zoro meet up on the platform, intending to go to the rooftop to face Kaido. They attempt to launch through the hole in the ceiling, but they are caught by Queen's dinosaur mouth and King also appears. They are flung off the balcony, where they are faced by Jaki on the ground below. However, Franky combines the Black Rhino FR-U IV and the Brachio Tank V to form General Franky. Operating the robot, Franky shoots down Jaki with his cannon. Unharmed by King's attack, Sanji emerges from the rubble and removes his raid suit. Although he is attacked by enemy units, Luffy and Zoro fight at his aid. The Straw Hats battle against the enemy Beast Pirates, remembering their past adventures as a crew. Despite being far stronger than most of the Beast Pirates, the Straw Hats are still greatly outnumbered. Still, they gather and prepare to battle against the Lead Performers and the Tobi Roppo.
1001	110	"A Risky Invitation! A Plot to Eliminate Queen!"; Transliteration: "Kiken na Sasoi! Kuīn Massatsu Keikaku" (Japanese: 危険な誘い！クイーン抹殺計画)	Tasuku Shimaya	Tomohiro Nakayama	Keita Saitō & Masahiro Kitazaki	November 28, 2021
Drake watches the alliance take on the Beast Pirates and thinks back to Koby telling him how Luffy draws people in. He tells Hawkins it is the best time to turncoat, but Hawkins refuses and predicts someone only has 1% chance of surviving until tomorrow. King contacts the Tobi Roppo and tells them to prevent the intruders from reaching the roof. Who's-Who then asks Drake to help him kill Queen. The samurai clash with the Mimawarigumi (a samurai squad that served Orochi) and the Orochi Oniwabanshu while Zoro and Jimbei save them from Goki's attack. Meanwhile, Drake and Who's-Who confront Queen only for, Who's-Who to instead turns on Drake, shooting him in the arm. Hawkins then reveals that his prediction was for Drake. Queen reveals that they were aware of Drake's betrayal all along; he was spotted letting Law out of prison, so they deduced that he was a traitor. Queen prepares to torture Drake for information regarding his true allegiances. The Straw Hats aid the samurai in battling another one of the Numbers, Goki. Luffy remembers when they defeated Oars in Thriller Bark. Although that battle required the efforts of the entire crew, Luffy transforms into his Boundman form to battle Goki on his own. Drake escapes, throwing a grenade at Queen before transforming into his Human-Beast Form and fleeing. Leaping into the party, he uses his sword and four-bladed axe to cut down another Number, Juki, just as Luffy defeats Goki. Noticing each other, Drake detransforms and asks Luffy to fight alongside him.
1002	111	"A New Rivalry! Nami and Ulti!"; Transliteration: "Arata na Innen! Nami to Uruti!" (Japanese: 新たな因縁！ナミとうるティ！)	Directed by : Toshihiro Maeya; Storyboarded by : Yutaka Nakashima	Ryo Yamazaki	Shinichi Suzuki	December 5, 2021
Before Luffy can answer, Zoro attacks Drake and tells Luffy not to trust him with Franky and Jimbei agreeing as well. However, Luffy lets him join despite his crew's protest and runs to the castle with Sanji. Page One and Ulti defeat a horde of samurai and try to attack Luffy before being stopped by Usopp and Nami. Apoo attacks Luffy and Sanji but its ineffective due to them covering their ears. As Apoo laments over the defeats of Jaki, Goki, and Juki, it is reveled that the Numbers consist of ten members. Haccha arrives to help and goes after the General Franky while carrying Jaki. Franky decides to run away, chased by Hatcha, to prevent him from further rampaging in the Performance Floor. Zoro continues to clash with Drake and questions his true identity until Apoo tries to summon more Numbers. They attack him together, but Apoo dodges and Zoro accepts Drake's alliance due to their mutual dislike of Apoo. They attack Apoo together until Queen fires a gatling gun into the crowd, striking several samurai fighters with bullets. Although their wounds are shallow, the bullets immediately begin taking effect, freezing the victims' skin and coating it with ice. Drake finds that the bullets fired were Plague Rounds, and the samurai were affected by another one of Queen's viruses.
1003	112	"A Heroic Blade! Akazaya vs. Kaido, Again Once More!"; Transliteration: "Hisō no Yaiba! Akazaya tai Kaidō Futatabi" (Japanese: 悲壮の刃！赤鞘VSカイドウ再び)	Directed by : Nanami Michibata; Storyboarded by : Masahiro Hosoda, Nanami Michibata & Tatsuya Nagamine	Atsuhiro Tomioka	Masayuki Takagi	December 12, 2021
The samurai shot by Queen continue to freeze over and turn into onis, attacking their own comrades who turn into demons as well. Queen fires more bullets at the samurai and even some of the Beast Pirates. Yamato is still chasing after Momonosuke and Shinobu to convince them she is their ally. The fierce battle atop the Skull Dome continues, and Shishilian manages to defeat Nangi in his Sulong form. Dogstorm and Cat Viper confront Jack, remembering how Jack terrorized the Mokomo Dukedom and severed their limbs. Elsewhere, Wanda and the Mink forces attempt to stop enemy Beasts Pirates from climbing to the top of the Skull Dome. Carrot also joins in but is forced to leave after hearing Perospero with Wanda chasing after her. Just outside the castle, Big Mom gets up from falling down the stairs and speaks with Perospero and Marco. The battle between Dogstorm and Cat Viper against Jack continues ends with the two Minks triumphant, slashing Jack's eye and cutting off part of his tusk. Kaido decides to take over the battle, acknowledging reassuring Jack that he did not lose because he was weak; his opponents were just too strong. Kaido then allows Jack to leave the battle to receive medical treatment for his injuries. Perospero initially protests her alliance with Kaido, but decides to trust her, but this places him at odds with Marco. Marco battles Big Mom fiercely just as Carrot shows up and recognizes Perospero, remembers how Pedro sacrificed himself to help the Straw Hats escape from him. Carrot charges in to avenge Pedro's death, before stopping to look at the full moon. As Luffy and Sanji run through the hallways, Kaidou fires a fireball at the samurai, but Kin'emon slices through it as the Akazaya Nine prepare for battle.
1004	113	"An Inherited Technique! Unleashing Oden's Secret Swordplay!"; Transliteration: "Uketsugishi Waza – Sakuretsu Oden no Hiken" (Japanese: 受け継ぎし技 炸裂おでんの秘剣)	Masahiro Shimanuki	Akiko Inoue	Yasunori Koyama	December 19, 2021
As Queen continues firing Plague Ronuns into the crowd, King orders Bao Huang to locate Momonosuke, who along with Shinobu, is still being chased by Yamato. The Akazaya Nine work together to battle Kaido. Raizo and Denjiro strike Kaido's underbelly, Kin'emon climbs onto his body and pierces his head, and Dogstorm and Cat Viper strike him with Electro. Kaidou is still unharmed, flinging them to the ground before blasting them with lightning. Still, just like Oden twenty years ago, the samurai rise in the flames Kin'emon remembers a time when Oden offered to teach them his Oden Two-Sword Style, but they declined. The Akazaya Nine rally together and their attacks begin to injure Kaido, who wonders in bewilderment how the Scabbards are able to hurt him, as none of their attacks are as strong Oden's. Kaido readies another fire breath attack against the samurai, but Raizo then summons a giant scroll which intercepts the fire blast and absorbs all of it before having the scroll wrap around Kaidou's entire dragon body before releasing the fire from it. Despite their efforts though Kaido remains unharmed. Undeterred, Kin'emon, Denjiro, Ashura, and Dogstorm charge at the emperor using Oden Two-Sword Style, with Kaido surprised to see an image of Oden as the samurai cut him in his scar using their master's sword style.
1005	114	"The Power of Ice Oni! A New Version of the Plague Rounds!"; Transliteration: "「Kōri Oni」no Iryoku! Arata na Ekisaito Dan" (Japanese: 「氷鬼」の威力！新たな疫災弾)	Directed by : Shō Inuzuka; Storyboarded by : Yutaka Nakashima	Shinzō Fujita	Shigefumi Shingaki	January 9, 2022
The slash that the Akazaya Nine inflicted on Kaido draws blood the scars that Oden made, as collapses from the injury. Back inside, Queen takes out his gatling gun and fires another volley of Plague Rounds. Zoro is forced to fight off the infected samurai who became hostile from the virus. The Straw Hats are appalled by this new highly-infectious virus, and Queen names it his masterpiece, the Ice Oni. In the hallway, after beating some Beast Pirates, Luffy and Sanji encounter Headliner Briscola, a SMILE Fruit user with a gorilla growing out of his left arm. Jinbe then arrive and defeats Briscola easily before joining Luffy and Sanji in battling against the remaining Beast Pirates. In the Flower Capital, the citizens continue to celebrate the Fire Festival while still clinging the belief that the Kozuki clan will save them. On the Skull Dome's rooftop, Kaido has fallen and the Akazaya Nine attempt to finish him off but he gets back up, telling them their attacks were too shallow to reopen his wound. He then unleashes a roar of wind blades, one of which cuts off Kikunojo's left arm.
1006	115	"I Won't Forgive Him! Chopper's Determination!"; Transliteration: "Yurusanē! Choppā no Ketsui!" (Japanese: 許さねェ！チョッパーの決意！)	Directed by : Ryōsuke Tanaka; Storyboarded by : Ryōsuke Tanaka & Tatsuya Nagamine	Hitoshi Tanaka	Kazuya Hisada	January 16, 2022
Shinobu and Momonosuke are chased by Yamato into the right brain tower. Shinobu uses a falling piece of paper to divert Yamato away from him. They are now safe from him, but they are spied on by Bao Huang's black cat. Bao Huang reports back to King about Momonosuke's location, and King sends the report to his subordinates. He orders all available Healiners and Tobi Roppo to go to the right brain tower to kill Momonosuke. Shinobu runs into a dark location only to be ambushed by the Beast Pirates' Armoured Division, led by Sasaki. All members of this division have SMILE abilities that give them an armour-like defense. Shinobu is attacked by a turtle SMILE user, and Momonosuke refuses to run away to save himself. Just then, Yamato appears at his aid, defeating the turtle man and sending him crashing into a wall. Yamato declares that she will fight for the Kouzuki Family. Queen starts to get bored of shooting the enemy samurai, so he decides to start firing at his own men as well. He shoots the Pleasures, knowing that they would simply laugh in response to being shot. Zoro, Chopper, Robin, Brook, the uninfected samurai, Mimawarigumi and Orochi Oniwabanshu battle the ice oni to avoid infection, the latter wondering where Fukurokuju went. However, one of the yakuza, Omasa, is scratched by an oni's nail and is infected. Chopper swears revenge on Queen for his gross misuse of manmade viruses. Luffy, Jinbe and Sanji run through the hallways and defeat Hamlet, a giraffe SMILE user who has an entire giraffe's body growing from his backside starting from the neck, thus leaving his main body hanging several meters in the air, and Fourtricks, a chicken SMILE user whose body is transformed into a large rooster, although his head is at the chicken's rear end. After being slashed by Kaido's attack, Kiku loses her left arm, her helmet shatters and her sword breaks in two. Dogstorm orders his subordinates to evacuate the rooftop to avoid the slash attacks. Izou bandages Kiku's arm and Kin'emon cauterizes the wound with his flaming sword to stop it from bleeding. Fully treated, Kiku returns to battle. Kaido says that that is how samurai should behave and states that he likes them, similar to how Roger and Whitebeard did too. He changes back into his human form and says that stating that death brings completion to a human. He asks if the samurai are ready to finish the fight but Kin'emon retorts that dying at his hand would bring no honor to any of them.
1007	116	"Zoro's Pursuit! Ice Oni Tag!"; Transliteration: "Zoro no Tsuigeki! Kōri Oni in Onigokko" (Japanese: ゾロの追撃！氷鬼in鬼ゴッコ)	Katsumi Tokoro	Tomohiro Nakayama	Kenji Yokoyama	January 23, 2022
As the Ice Oni virus spreads throughout the live floor, Omasa considers killing himself to prevent himself from becoming an oni, but Hyougoro dissuades him, reminding him of how the Udon prisoners were cured of the Mummy virus by the Straw Hats. As Queen spreads Ice Oni, he gives Apoo the only known antidote, threatening to kill him if he loses it. and starts a game for it where everyone chase after Apoo to claim the antidote or everyone infected dies within an hour. Dogstorm and Cat Viper revert to their base forms after being knocked back by Kaido. Yamato reveals to Momonosuke and Shinobu that she was at Oden's execution and was inspired by Shinobu's speech as well as Oden's life. The Armored Corps fires at them again with Yamato taking the hit while also revealing that she rushed to Kuri Castle to save Momonosuke but couldn't do anything to help him. She knocks out one of Sasaki's men and formally introduces herself to Momonosuke and Shinobu.
1008	117	"Nami Surrenders?! Ulti's Fierce Headbutt!"; Transliteration: "Nami Kōfuku!? Uruti no Mō-zutsuki" (Japanese: ナミ降伏!? うるティの猛頭突き)	Directed by : Tasuku Shimaya; Storyboarded by : Yutaka Nakashima & Tasuku Shimaya	Shōji Yonemura	Shūichi Itō	January 30, 2022
Marco battles with Big Mom, with his blue phoenix flames clashing with Prometheus' flames. Although Marco defeats Prometheus, Big Mom picks him up and Perospero prepares to shoot him with a candy arrow. Apoo is chased by Zoro and Drake, who attack him viciously for the antibody sample. Queen watches from above, recognizing two of the Straw Hats as Roronoa Zoro and Sanji, son of Vinsmoke Judge. Brook is bitten by an oni, but due to having no skin, blood or warmth he is unaffected, however, Chopper becomes infected with the Ice Oni. Ulti and Page One continue to chase Nami and Usopp down the halls. They separate, and Ulti chases Nami into a bathhouse. She overpowers Nami and strikes her to the ground with a headbutt. Usopp attempts to intervene with his Pop Greens but with Page One's help Ulti defeats Usopp. With this, Nami surrenders, and Ulti pressures her to admit that Kaido will become the King of the Pirates instead of Luffy. Nami recalls when she first met Luffy in Orange Town. Later, Luffy stood up against her oppressor, Arlong, and liberated her village. Remembering how well Luffy treated her, Nami bravely declares to Ulti that Luffy will become the King of the Pirates. Just then, Tama appears with Komachiyo, who bites Ulti's head and frees Nami.
1009	118	"Sasaki's Onslaught! Armored Division vs. Yamato!"; Transliteration: "Sasaki no Mōkō – Sōkōbutai tai Yamato" (Japanese: ササキの猛攻 装甲部隊VSヤマト)	Yusuke Suzuki	Ryo Yamazaki	Toshio Deguchi & Kimitaka Itō	February 6, 2022
Still in grief over Pedro's death, Carrot becomes furious at the sight of Perospero. Wanda consoles her, stating that Pedro took his turn as he promised and did not die with regrets. Together, they transform into their Sulong forms. Just before Perospero could fire his arrow, Wanda and Carrot appear and scratch his face. Big Mom tosses Marco, who is caught by Carrot and Wanda, aside to go back inside the castle. Marco follow suit and is surprised by the Ice Onis while Carrot and Wanda deal with Perospero. Page One rescues Ulti from Komachiyo and attacks Usopp, who lands on Komachiyo's back during its escape. Tama reveals she arrived on the island by the enemy's ship and tells Hihimaru to hold off Page One and Ulti for three minutes. Yamato continues to blow away Sasaki's Armored Division while protecting Momonosuke and Shinobu. When Sasaki prepares to join the battle, Yamato begins to transform until Franky arrives with Hatcha, who destroys the floor. As Yamato escapes with Momonosuke and Shinobu, she knocks out Hatcha while Franky confronts Sasaki and his Armored Division. As she runs with Momonosuke and Shinobu in her arms, Yamato tells Momonosuke to live because she believes he is the one who will lead the world to the new dawn.
1010	119	"Eliminate the Ice Oni! Chopper's Fire Trick!"; Transliteration: "Kōri Oni o Yabure – Choppā no Hisaku!" (Japanese: 氷鬼を破れ チョッパーの火策！)	Kōhei Kureta	Akiko Inoue	Midori Matsuda & Kazuya Hisada	February 13, 2022
Law finds a Poneglyph while thinking back to when Corazon told him about D. and telling Robin his true name. He continues to look for the Road Poneglyph in order to learn D.'s true meaning as he wonders why he lives the checkered life he lives. Back inside the castle, while Zoro and Drake battle Apoo for the cure, Omasa completely becomes an oni as Chopper, having contracted the Ice Oni virus, attempts to nullify the symptoms by slowing the freezing. Brook uses a torch to keep Chopper's body warm, and this prevents the virus from spreading to the rest of his body. Just then, Big Mom appears riding on both Prometheus and Zeus. In the hallways, as he and Killer head for the rooftop, Kid gathers a ton of metal in preparations against Kaido. They have a brief encounter with Headliner Poker, a rattlesnake SMILE user, though Kid decides not to finish him off and get past him. On the rooftop, despite their best efforts, Kaido easily overwhelms the Akazaya Nine, breaking the rooftop with his strikes sending Kikunojo's severed arm falling into the Performance Floor below. As Big Mom decides to ride up to join Kaido, Zoro notices Kiku's severed arm falling from the roof he becomes further enraged by Queen's lack of empathy for the ailing people and begins cutting the Ice Onis down in rage before cutting Apoo down with a silent Death Lion Song. He gives the cure to Chopper who uses fire to slow the symptoms down, before moving on to another area. hopper announces his findings to the crowd, and works on creating a cure for the virus. Luffy, Sanji, and Jimbei are about to reach the third floor when Sanji hears a woman in trouble.
1011	120	"It's Not Okay! The Spider Lures Sanji!"; Transliteration: "Yokanē yo!! Sanji o Sasou Kumo" (Japanese: よかねェよ!! サンジを誘う蜘蛛)	Masahiro Hosoda	Shinzō Fujita	Keita Saitō, Masahiro Kitazaki & Shigenori Taniguchi	February 20, 2022
Sanji splits away from the group to rescue the harassed woman. However, when Sanji burst through the door, he is caught in a sticky spider web, revealed to be a trap created by Black Maria. Luffy and Jinbe are watched by Bao Huang's cat. Huang reports to King that Luffy has reached the third floor. King positions two Headliners, Poker and Mizerka, a gorilla SMILE fruit user, at the stairs to the fourth floor. However, Luffy meets with the Udon prisoners, who have built him a ladder to the next floor allowing him and Jinbe to sneak past the Headliners. Kin'emon tries to battle Kaido but is sent flying. At the Performance Floor Chopper then announces to everyone that he figured out how the virus works: Ice Oni is fused with a gas that chills the body, so everyone needs to use fire to stop the chilling. He declares he will make enough antibodies for everyone, friend and foe alike. Queen sees this and prepares to blast Chopper and Apoo for failing to hold on to the antidote. His gatling gun, however, is destroyed by Zoro, who angrily tells Queen he did not come all the way to the island to waste time on his stupid game, but to cut down Kaido. Suddenly an earthquake strikes Onigashima as Marco enters the Performance Floor and finds Zoro. Outside, Yamato, Momonosuke and Shinobu start to evacuate, but the tremors abruptly stop. Yamato discovers that the Beast Pirates' ship has disappeared from the port, leaving behind a lilac fog. She explains that dragons can fly by creating Flame Clouds and using them as footholds to move through the air. Kaido, who uses his Devil Fruit powers conjures Flame Clouds from the rooftop, is now using the clouds to lift up the entire island of Onigashima out of the ocean into the air to move it to the Flower Capital as Kaido declares that the Kouzuki Clan are finished, that Wano will become "New Onigashima" and the world of violence has begun.
1012	121	"A Turnaround Move! The Flames of Marco the Phoenix!"; Transliteration: "Gyakuten no Itte! Fushichō Maruko no Honō" (Japanese: 逆転の一手！不死鳥マルコの炎)	Directed by : Toshihiro Maeya; Storyboarded by : Yutaka Nakashima	Hitoshi Tanaka	Shinichi Suzuki	February 27, 2022
With Chopper, discovering that fire can be used against the Ice Oni virus, Marco uses his phoenix flames to slowdown the Ice Oni's spread on its victims, making them regain their senses temporarily, though he warns everyone the flame will disappear when their stamina runs out. When Chopper leaves with Miyagi and Tristan to work on the antidote, Queen attempts to turn the Beast Pirates against the Straw Hats, claiming that Chopper does not intend to heal everyone with the antidote. Hyougoro's forces hold the enemy army off, while Drake transforms into his allosaurus form to attack a vengeful Apoo, allowing Chopper to start working on a cure. On the way to the rooftop, Luffy and Jinbe encounter a room with enemy Beast Pirates. As Jinbe holds them off so Luffy ca continues on his way, he is observed by an obscured enemy. In the Right Rrain Tower, Franky battles the Armored Division with General Franky, but Sasaki intervenes and transforms into his Dragon-Dragon Fruit, Ancient Type Model: Triceratops Beast Form, before the two start to clash. Meanwhile, Ulti and Page One rampage in their Beast Forms, defeating Hihimaru before starting to pursue Nami, Usopp, Tama and Komachiyo. Yamato takes Momonosuke and Shinobu to a storage room to hide and Momonosuke asks about the broken dragon statue. Yamato explains that the statue once decorated the front of the island, but it was left abandoned in the storehouse after it was damaged by her friend who came to Wano to kill Kaido several years ago, Portgas D Ace.
1013	122	"Yamato's Past! The Man Who Came for an Emperor of the Sea!"; Transliteration: "Yamato no Kako – Yonkō no Kubi o Nerau Otoko" (Japanese: ヤマトの過去 四皇の首を狙う男)	Ryōta Nakamura	Tomohiro Nakayama	Masayuki Takagi	March 6, 2022
Sanji tries to escape Black Maria only to be captured by her again in her jorōgumo-like Human-Beast Form of her Spider-Spider Fruit, Model: Rosamygale Grauvogeli. Meanwhile, as Luffy battles fiercely against the Beast Pirates, Jimbei takes down some of Who's-Who subordinates who, while in his Cat-Cat Fruit, Ancient Type Model: Saber-Toothed Tiger Beast Form, reveals to Jimbei that they were once allies when he was Warlord. Yamato treats Shinobu and tells Momonosuke how Ace came to Onigashima to rescue the abducted children and take Kaido's head. However, he was confronted by Yamato who revealed that the Beast Pirates went on an expedition and that she is Kaido's daughter. As the Spade Pirates take the children back to their parents, Ace stays behind to battle Yamato and learns the reason why she cannot leave the island. However, Ace tells her otherwise which causes Yamato to destroy the dragon statue at the gate and Ace punches the statue to take responsibility. They then share a bottle of sake and Ace tells Yamato about the up-and-coming pirates that are appearing but tells him that his brother will be the greatest. Momonosuke is surprised that another pirate appeared to help Wano and that Kaido is Yamato's father. He also learns from Yamato that Ace died two years ago. Elsewhere, Tama reveals her history with Ace to Nami and how ungently Luffy told her he had died. Nami apologizes and reveals to Tama how Ace's death was painful for Luffy as well. Yamato tells Momonosuke that she was waiting for Luffy, who has inherited Ace's will.
1014	123	"Marco's Tears! The Bond of the Whitebeard Pirates!"; Transliteration: "Maruko no Namida! Shirohige Kaizokudan no Kizuna" (Japanese: マルコの涙！白ひげ海賊団の絆)	Katsumi Tokoro	Shōji Yonemura	Masahiro Shimanuki	April 17, 2022
The samurai defend Chopper as he makes the antidote and Marco restores more Ice Oni victims. Queen order the Beasts Pirates, who are reluctant at first, to attack Marco to no avail. Marco tells Robin and Brook to head to the castle before he transforms into his phoenix form and flies Zoro to the roof Zoro to the roof while thinking back Ace. When he was a part of the Whitebeard Pirates, Ace tried to convince the crew to help free the Land of Wano. Due to the Wano's isolation, the crew only learned of Oden's death several years after it happened and though they thought about making a move on Wano, they decided against it out of fear of lose of innocent life that would come from a war against the Beast Pirates, while Whitebeard forbade Ace from facing Kaido on his own. Meanwhile, Tama learns that Luffy and Ace are adopted brothers and regrets for what she said to Luffy earlier but is reassured by Nami and Usopp. Momonosuke is also surprised to learn that Ace was both Roger's biological son and Luffy's adopted older brother, while Yamato feels that it must have been fate that Momonosuke chose Luffy to help him. Marco holds King and Queen (who is revealed to have a gun planted in his mouth and a mechanical elongated neck) back while he throws Zoro up to the roof. The Musketeers and Guardians defend the entrance to the roof until Luffy arrives and heads up after defeating a group of the Beast Pirates. After having Zeus and Prometheus regain their strength, Big Mom tells Kaido not to kill Robin as they need her as Big Mom no longer wants to wait for Pudding's power to awaken and they argue when she asks about the Road Ponegliff. She reminds Kaido of his life debt of her giving him the Mythical Zoan-type Fish-Fish Fruit, Model Azure Dragon the same day Rocks fell. However, Kaido brushes her off and says that they can talk about it all they want once they find the One Piece.
1015	124	"Straw Hat Luffy! The Man Who Will Become the King of the Pirates!"; Transliteration: "Mugiwara no Rufi – Kaizoku Ō ni Naru Otoko" (Japanese: 麦わらのルフィ 海賊王になる男)	Megumi Ishitani	Ryo Yamazaki	Keisuke Mori & Kimitaka Itō	April 24, 2022
Yamato shows Momonosuke his father's journal and tells him how she found it. He reveals that Whitebeard, Roger, and Oden predicted that the next generation of pirates would advance to the New World. He also thought Ace would lead the charge until his death, as he recalled Ace telling him about Luffy and his dream. Yamato tells Ace that another person that knew Oden had the same exact dream (unbeknownst to Ace was Roger). She then made Ace's Vivre Card and gave it to him, telling him that they will meet again through it. However, during the Summit War of Marineford, Ace was killed in Marineford. As he died, Yamato could only watch as Ace's Vivre Card disintegrated before her eyes. While overcome with grief, Yamato remembered when Ace told her that his adopté younger brother, Monkey D. Luffy, would rise as a powerful pirate. Yamato resolved to wait for Luffy to come to save the country from Kaido. In the present, Yamato gives Oden's journal to Momonosuke and explains how Oden predicted the next group of pirates would defeat Kaido in his stead. Kid, Killer, Law and Zoro reach the rooftop to confront Kaido and Big Mom, with Luffy soon joining them. Luffy notices something and starts walking toward the two as Kaido tells Big Mom what Luffy told him previously. Big Mom also adds how he talked back at her and how he destroyed her castle, so she wants an apology. To their surprise though, Luffy ignores them and walks past them to check on the Akazaya Nine and Kin'emon asks Luffy to save Wano, who agrees citing that it is the land of his friends. An annoyed Kaido proceeds to raise his club to strike Luffy, who asks Law to move everyone away with his Devil Fruit powers, which he does so. Luffy then jumps high into the air dodging Kaido's strike and remembering all the people who made the rebellion possible, Luffy creates a most powerful Ryuo-imbued combination of the Red Hawk and Elephant Gun; Gum-Gum Red Roc and strikes and injures Kaido down, shocking Big Mom so much. He then introduces himself to the as the one who will surpass the two of them and become the King of the Pirates.
1016	125	"The Battle of the Monsters! The Three Stubborn Captains!"; Transliteration: "Kaibutsu Kessen! Iji Hariau San Senchō" (Japanese: 怪物決戦！意地張りあう三船長)	Directed by : Yasunori Koyama; Storyboarded by : Yutaka Nakashima	Atsuhiro Tomioka	Shigefumi Shingaki	May 8, 2022
Kaido attacks Luffy, who barely dodges and is pleased, especially after seeing the shadows of those who were capable of fighting him behind Luffy. Big Mom attempts to attack Luffy with Prometheus but Zoro cuts it in half using Foxfire Style while Kaido attempts to attack a distracted Luffy. In the Pleasure Hall, Sanji is kept bound by Black Maria but is too charmed by the women to attempt to escape. Eventually, he decides to free himself by burning the webs with Diable Jambe flames, then uses the webs to fight off the ladies. However, he cannot find himself to attack Black Maria, and Maria starts interrogating him about his crew's whereabouts, especially Robin. Law rescues Luffy, before he, Luffy and Kid begin bickering just as Prometheus shoots fireballs at them. Luffy suggests a contest where the last to dodge the fireball would win. Since they were focused on winning this contest, they all ended up being hit by the fireballs. Big Mom fires fireballs at the three captains who refused to dodge due to Luffy's game. Zoro reveals to Killer that he's aware the latter was Kamazo while Killer states his believe that he would have won their fight if he had his Punishers (a pair of gauntlets equipped with rotating sickle blades). The two combatants attack Kaido, to no effect, as Luffy, Law, and Kid get back up and prepare to attack. Luffy transforms into his Fourth Gear: Bounceman, Kid gathers metallic objects to form Punk Rotten, a gigantic skull-faced demon-like golem made of scrap and Law creates a large Room and uses it to ride on rocks. They prepare for battle as Kaido excitedly calls them "monsters."
1017	126	"A Barrage of Powerful Techniques! The Fierce Attacks of the Worst Generation!"; Transliteration: "Ōwaza Renpatsu! Saiaku no Sedai no Mōkō!" (Japanese: 大技連発！最悪の世代の猛攻！)	Directed by : Kōhei Kureta & Nanami Michibata; Storyboarded by : Satoshi Itō, Tatsuya Nagamine, Henry Thurlow, Nanami Michibata & Katsumi Ishizuka	Akiko Inoue	Yong-Ce Tu	May 15, 2022
Kaido prepares a counterattack, but Luffy strikes Kaido's stomach with Kong Gun, Kid crushes him with his fists using Punk Vise, and Law pummels him with rocks using Tact. Still, they continue to bicker over whose attack was stronger. He turns back into his dragon form and Big Mom joins him, revealing they intend to take everything from the Worst Generation declaring the winner of the battle will be one step closer to becoming King of the Pirates. Kaido attacks with Demolition Gust (the same move that severed Kikunojo's arm) but everyone dodges it with Luffy, Kid, and Law counterattacking and injuring him. Killer then unleashs a barrage of sonic slashes on Kaido but is struck down by a lightning bolt by Big Mom. Kaido admits the Worst Generation is vexing, but before he can chomp on Killer, Luffy strikes him with dropkick Kaido in the face. Kaido prepares to breathe fire, but Zoro tells Law to move him into the air, which he does reluctantly. Zoro cuts through the fire to protect Luffy while having Law move him higher to prepare for a powerful attack. Big Mom warns Kaidou to dodge because the sword Zoro was using is no ordinary sword. Unfortunately, Zoro's attack misses only grazing Kaido's cheek and ends up cutting off one of the horns of the Skull Dome. While Kaido wonders why he senses Oden's presence in the sword, Big Mom unleshes a plethora of sentient, direction-changing lightning onto the young pirate but is surprised when doesn't affect Luffy, who exclaims that he's rubber. Kaido fires another Blast Breath at him, but to Kaido's equal surprise, Luffy came out unscathed as well, claiming that it was his guts that protected him before hitting Kaido with a Kong Gatling.
1018	127	"Kaido Laughs! The Emperors of the Sea vs. New Generation!"; Transliteration: "Warau Kaidō! Yonkō tai Shin Sedai!" (Japanese: 笑うカイドウ！四皇VS新世代！)	Kenichi Takeshita	Shinzō Fujita	Kenji Yokoyama	May 22, 2022
Luffy continues to hit Kaido with Kong Gatling and knock him into the roof with everybody in the Skull Dome noticing the vibrations, astounding Big Mom and the Worst Generation. Luffy attempts to land one more hit, but Fourth Gear wears off and he collapses. Big Mom tries attacks him until Zoro rescues him. Law hits Big Mom with Counter Shock while Kid and Killer charge at Kaido, who gets back up and uses his Drago Twister to create several tornados to blow everyone away and eats Luffy. Zoro uses his own Dragon Twister to free Luffy and cut through Kaido's scales. Kaido finally deduces that Zoro was using Oden's sword, as the pain and strange Haki felt similar. He decides to challenge Zoro using Dragon Twister Demolition Gust, which everyone tries to dodge. The fierce battle on the rooftop is heard from the live floor. CP0 agents who have entered the party, sitting away from the conflict, using a go board to depict the battle status, using black pieces to represent the Beast Pirates and white for the Ninja-Pirate-Mink-Samurai Alliance. The battle started with 30,000 Beast Pirates against 5,400 Alliance members, with numbers of both sides decreasing with the Beast Pirate now with 27,000 men against the Alliance's 5,000 remaining members. They lament that their supplier, Orochi, was killed, but note that this battle was inevitable since Luffy took down Doflamingo. They predict with certainty that the Beast Pirates will triumph, but nevertheless encourages battle hoping that the pirates will destroy each other. On the rooftop, Kaido then changes into his Human-Beast Form, (which is obscured) which surprises the Worst Generation, and tells Big Mom that this battle has started to get fun, which she agrees with.
1019	128	"Otama's Secret Plan! Operation Kibi Dango!"; Transliteration: "Otama no Hisaku! Kibi Dango Dai Sakusen" (Japanese: お玉の秘策！きびだんご大作戦)	Ryōsuke Tanaka	Hitoshi Tanaka	Keita Saitō & Toshio Deguchi	May 29, 2022
On Onigashima, Speed starts distributing kibi dangos to the Gifters saying they are medicine created by Queen, apparently granting added strength. When Briscola eats a dango and questions its genuinity, Speed discreetly threatens him with the idea of having him tell Queen something he allegolly made was a failure, leading Briscola to suddenly reports to having a surge in energy, encouraging the other Gifters to eat the dumplings. Hours before Tama entered Onigashima, she asked Speed to take her to the island so she could assist the raid. Speed agreed immediately to take her, along with a tamed Daifugo and Gazelleman. On the ship, Tama created several kibi dangos to tame the Gifters on Onigashima despite tiring herself out, determined to help in the fight against Kaido in any way. Back to the present, after uniting with Nami's group, Gazelleman and Daifugo forcefully feed the kibi dangos to the Gifters in the corridors while Usopp shoots a dango into Hamlet's mouth, taming him. At the Performance Floor, while protecting Chopper, Hyogoro becomes infected by a samaurai when Marco's flame wears off. Franky continues to battle Sasaki gaining upper hand until the Beast Pirates restrain him and prevent him from moving. Just then, Nami, Usopp, and Tama arrive with several Gifters and they subdue the Armored Corps. Page One and Ulti, who caught up to the Straw Hats, tell Sasaki that the Gifters and Headliners have turned on them, which the siblings deduce that it is the work of a Devil Fruit. Ulti tries to attack them but Nami incapacitates her with a lightning bolt, though Nami state that she needs something even more powerful to beat Ulti. Usopp uses his sniping skills to launch dumplings into the mouths of the Armored Corp, turning them over to their side. This allows an opening for Franky to cut a confused Sasaki with Greneral Franky's sword, Franken.
1020	129	"Sanji's Scream! An SOS Echoes Over the Island!"; Transliteration: "Sanji Zekkyō! Shimajū ni Hibiku Esu Ō Esu" (Japanese: サンジ絶叫！島中に響くSOS)	Tasuku Shimaya	Tomohiro Nakayama	Kazuya Hisada	June 5, 2022
Black Maria's women beat Sanji until he' knocked out and he wakes up to see Black Maria has crucified him with webs. Maria orders Sanji to call for Robin using a surveillance unit. When Bao Huang attempts to locate the Akazaya Nine her shared vision with the Marys. She determines they are in the Treasure Repository and there is an unknown person in the room helping them. Carrot and Wanda turn into their Sulong form and confront Perospero, but he covers them with candy, turning them into Candymen. Carrot frees herself and Wanda, using Electro to melt the candy. However, when Perospero distractes them with the fact the full moon is about to be obscured by clouds, he catches Wanda in a candy net before crushing her with a Candy Maiden. On the Performance Floor, Marco battles King as Chopper continues to try to make an antidote for the Ice Onis. Hyougoro, who was infected, decides to fight as much as he can as he suddenly transforms into a younger version of himself. Before she goes to pursue the wounded samurai, Black Maria carries out her plan. She tortures Sanji into calling for Robin's help by punching him with brass knuckles. Sanji calls out for help at the top of his lungs, and the Marys announce the message throughout the Performance Floor. His message is heard throughout the castle with some of them thinking his call for help is pathetic. Jinbe deduces that the Beast Pirates are after Robin for her knowledge and Franky mocks Sanji for his whining when he also deduces that Robin is being set up to be captured. Marco admits that the Straw Hats are fun and Nami is not surprised that Sanji was calling for help if his opponent is a woman. Usopp points to a cat with a paper with an eye on it over its face and wonders what they are for. Black Maria prepares to deliver one final blow to finish Sanji, but Robin sprouts a giant arm, striking Black Maria.
1021	130	"Spank Strikes! Sanji's Woman-trouble!"; Transliteration: "Supanku Sakutersu! Sanji no Jonan!" (Japanese: スパンク炸裂！サンジの女難！)	Masahiro Hosoda	Atsuhiro Tomioka	Shūichi Itō	June 12, 2022
Robin strikes down Black Maria as Brook frees Sanji by freezing and shattering the webs. As Robin faces Black Maria, she thanks Sanji for relying on her as he escapes. Bao Huang announces Yamato's location to the Performance Floor. Yamato locates and strikes down the mouse with a paper with an eye on it over its face. Yamato explains that it is a cyborg, known as a Mary, that serves as Kaido's surveillance unit by broadcasting their findings to human Marys. Now that Yamato's location has been revealed, enemy Beast Pirates approach the storehouse. With Momonosuke hiding in her robe, Yamato battles the pirates to escape. Carrot becomes furious after Wanda was defeated by Perospero. She charges Perospero, melting his candy and breaking through his candy armour. However, before she can deliver the final blow clouds block the moon, she loses her Sulong form. Upon hearing Bao Huang broadcast, is unsure to help either Kin'emon's groups or Momonosuke, so he decides to go down a random path, hoping to meet with some of the allies. After defeating and taunting Carrot, Perospero leaves to join the others in battle. On the roof, Kaido reveals his hybrid form to the Worst Generation. One minute remains before Luffy can use Haki again, so he sleeps to get rest. Killer attempts to cut Kaido, but his body is now too hard for him to cut. Killer is struck away by Kaido's club. As Black Maria was unavailable, Jack, having been bandaged and his tusk reattached, decides to go to the treasure repository to kill the samurai. Bao Huang reports that somehow, the Akazaya Nine's injuries have been bandaged. Now that Jack is taking care of the samurai, Black Maria now focuses on battling Robin, as she removes her robe to reveal a tattoo reading "女難" ("Girl Trouble") while wielding a large weapon with a Wanyūdō at the end. She tells Robin that at the end of the battle, she will belong to Kaido, but Robin tells her that she would rather die.
1022	131	"No Regrets! Luffy and Boss, a Master-Disciple Bond!"; Transliteration: "Kui Nashi – Rufi to Oyabun Shitei no Kizuna" (Japanese: 悔いなし ルフィと親分師弟の絆)	Directed by : Yusuke Suzuki; Storyboarded by : Yusuke Suzuki & Yutaka Nakashima	Ryo Yamazaki	Masayuki Takagi	June 19, 2022
On the live floor of Skull Dome, Chopper works on the antidote but starts to run out of stamina. Still, he pushes through, using the last of his strength. Hyougoro also decides to use the last of his strength, battling the enemy Beast Pirates. However, he instructs his men to kill him once the transformation is complete. As he takes on the Mimawarigumi, he regrets not battling with Oden against Kaido while in his prime. However, he is pleased that the alliance now has a powerful asset, Luffy. On the rooftop, Kaido sends more slashes at his enemies in his Human-Beast Form and Big Mom makes Zeus unleash more lightning bolts. Luffy, having rested enough, is able to use Haki again and is ready to reenter the battle. Queen fires a laser beam from his mouth at Marco, but he avoids it before engaging both King and Queen managing to best both of them, sending King flying into a house and Queen into a wall. Although both survive and emerge from the rubble, this buys Chopper some extra time. However, Perospero, who enters from the stairs, spots him exhausted. Chopper manages to develop a cure for the virus. Before he administers the antidote to other people, he decides to test it on himself to guarantee its safety, noting the antidote creates a high fever meant to combat the virus. Hyougoro defeats both the Orochi Oniwabanshu and the Mimawarigumi, but he begins to transform into an Ice Oni. He orders his men to kill him so he would not endanger his allies. Leaving the battle to his subordinates, he states that he has no regrets.
1023	132	"All Set! Chopperhage Nebulizer!"; Transliteration: "Junbi Ōkē! Chopafāji Neburaizā" (Japanese: 準備OK! チョパファージ霧砲(ネブライザー))	Directed by : Toshihiro Maeya; Storyboarded by : Yutaka Nakashima	Atsuhiro Tomioka	Shinichi Suzuki	July 3, 2022
After taking the antidote, Chopper is cured, and the ice crumbles off his skin. Marco struggles against King and Queen, who attack him from two angles. He is sent crashing into a wall. Meanwhile, Yatappe and Tsunagoro hesitate to kill Hyougoro and Omasa, reluctant to kill their comrades. The Waiters and Pleasures beg Queen to save them. Queen turns into his brachiosaurus form and berates them, calling them useless to the crew since they have no special abilities. He tells them that they should simply succumb to the virus. He also tries to turn the pirates against Chopper, claiming that he cured himself and escaped. Delighted, he prepares to administer the cure to the people. Just before Yatappe could behead Hyougoro, Chopper kicks the sword away. He sprays the antidote sample into Hyougoro's mouth, curing him as well. Then, Miyagi and Tristan load and fire a cannon. The cannonball, named the "Chopperphage", releases a pink mist into the Performance Floor, curing all those who inhale it. Chopper confronts a furious Queen for his abhorrent use of a virus in war. Queen fires bullets at Chopper but the Pleasures rush to his aid. Since Chopper saved them, the Pleasures decide to join his side, fighting Queen. Marco takes this opportunity to grab Queen by the neck, allowing Chopper to transform into his Monster Point form and strikes Queen, as he yells at everyone, who inwardly apologizes, that he isn't a raccoon. On the rooftop, Luffy rejoins the battle against Kaido. Meanwhile, in the treasure repository, the Akazaya Nine wake up to find their wounds bandaged. They open the door to find, to their surprise, Oden greeting them.
1024	133	"Oden Appears! The Confused Hearts of the Akazaya Members!"; Transliteration: "Oden Arawaru! Yureru Akazaya no Kokoro!" (Japanese: おでん現る！揺れる赤鞘の心！)	Directed by : Shō Inuzuka; Storyboarded by : Yutaka Nakashima	Akiko Inoue	Masahiro Shimanuki	July 10, 2022
In the Right Brain Tower, Yamato and Shinobu defend Momonosuke from enemy Beast Pirates, but Momonosuke becomes frustrated by his inability to fend for himself. He accidentally transforms into a pink dragon, shocking Yamato. Momonosuke thinks back to when he was in Punk Hazard, he broke into a restricted area and ate a fruit, not knowing it was Vegapunk's Artificial Devil Fruit. Yamato comments that his ability is very similar to Kaido's. In the room CP0 are in, agent talks about when the Punk Hazard scientists, led by Vegapunk, created the fruit by extracting Kaido's Lineage Factor when he was once captured by the Navy. However, the experiment was deemed a failure and the fruit was left abandoned in the laboratory following its closure. In the treasure repository, the Akazaya Nine are happy to see Oden, assuming that he must have escaped the boiling pot and survived. Oden claims to have been saved by Toki's power and offers to lead them once again. However, Ashura and Raizo become suspicious and the latter reminding Kin'emon that Toki told them that it is impossible to return to the past. Ashura slices Oden's face, but he does not bleed. Furthermore, Oden stabs Ashura with his sword, confirming he is an impostor. It is revealed he is a drawing made by Kanjuro. Kanjuro states that he was fatally wounded by Kikunojo and would not survive the battle, but he plans to kill Momonosuke in his final moments. While in the hallways, Momonosuke returns to normal and somehow reveals that Luffy is worn out but still in high spirits. On the Skull Dome's roof, as the Worst Generation are being pushed back by Kaido and Big Mom, they decide to split them up in order to beat them.
1025	134	"The Worst Generation Gets Wiped Out?! The Emperors' Deadly Attack!"; Transliteration: "Saiaku no Sedai Zenmetsu!? Yonkō no Ōwaza!" (Japanese: 最悪の世代全滅!? 四皇の大技！)	Katsumi Tokoro	Shinzō Fujita	Shigefumi Shingaki	July 17, 2022
The Akazaya Nine fight off the Kanjuro-controlled Oden, but Oden reveals and lights an explosive vest. To save the others, Ashura tackles Oden, crashing through a window before the vest detonates, killing them both. The Akazaya Nine begin to grieve his death. Kanjuro runs through the halls, still looking for Momonosuke, and states that he intends to kill the young lord then die himself, finally ending his life-long play. Meanwhile, in another room, a somehow still-living and vengeful Orochi knocks over a barrel of oil and sets it aflame, setting the castle on fire. The remaining Akazaya run through the hallways but quickly run into Jack, surrounded by fallen Mink warriors. Dogstorm break away from the group to battle Jack while the others advance to rescue Momonosuke. Meanwhile, Queen gets up to battle Chopper, but Marco rushes to his aid, battling Queen together. Although some Beast Pirates attempt to put the fires out, Orochi cuts them down before he's joined by Fukurokuju, planning to burn down Onigashima as revenge against Kaido. On the rooftop, as the Worst Generation try to figure out a way to separate the two emperors, with saying Law cannot transport them downstairs because their Haki is too strong. Kaido and Big Mom decide to use a joint attack to try and wipe them out and they launch Conquest of the Sea, unleashing an extremely powerful shockwave. The Worst Generation members are unable to dodge the attack, but Zoro blocks the attack, protecting the others from the attack but leaving himself gravely injured. Luffy attempts to retaliate but Kaido evades the attack, preparing to attack him further.
1026	135	"The Supernovas Strike Back! The Mission to Tear Apart the Emperors!"; Transliteration: "Chōshinsei Hangeki! Yonkō Bunkai Sakusen" (Japanese: 超新星反撃！四皇分解作戦)	Ryōta Nakamura	Hitoshi Tanaka	Masahiro Kitazaki, Kimitaka Itō, Yong-Ce Tu & Toshio Deguchi	July 24, 2022
Orochi and Fukurokuju continue to set fire to the castle, as they prepare to go to the explosive storage. The remaining Akazaya Nine run through the hallways, worried about the fire, when they run into Orochi. The samurai tell Orochi that he's inconsequential to them. Fukurokuju offers to battle them, but Orochi insists on battling them himself, transforming into his Yamata no Orochi form (though it only now have seven heads). Despite this, the Akazaya Nine cut off Orochi's heads effortlessly, with Kin'emon cutting down his main head. When Orochi collapses, the Akazaya depart with Raizo staying behind to deal with Fukurokuju. Meanwhile, Kaido and Big Mom continue to battle the Worst Generation on the rooftop, with Kaidou battling Luffy and Big Mom battling the others. Still, Luffy struggles to hurt Kaido and Big Mom wreaks havoc on the Worst Generation. As the Akazaya members hear the battle raging on the roof, Kin'emon assures his faith in Luffy. On the rooftop, the Worst Generation are being overwhelmed, with Kaido saying he'll take everything from them but Luffy reaffirms that they'll he'll never let Kaido take what's theirs. The pirates re-engage, with Luffy fighting hard against Kaido, only to be hit by a powerful blow from the Emperor. The rest of the Worst Generation tries a strategy to take Big Mom down by immobilizing her homies. Law traps Zeus into a metal box created by Kid, Zoro slices Prometheus into several pieces, and Killer distracts Napoleon by attacking him. With all her homies unable to aid her, Kid attaches some scrap to Big Mom to levitate her into the air while Law launches a boulder at her sending her to the edge of the island, as Zoro cuts off the cliff edge, causing her to start falling into the sea.
1027	136	"Defend Luffy! Zoro and Law's Sword Technique!"; Transliteration: "Rufi o Mamore! Zoro to Rō no Kengi" (Japanese: ルフィを守れ！ゾロとローの剣技)	Tatsuya Nagamine	Tomohiro Nakayama	Midori Matsuda & Keita Saitō	July 31, 2022
Big Mom falls into the ocean below and starts to drown, but her homies are unable to go rescue her. With Luffy left unconscious from Kaido's attack, Kaido aids the homies by attacking Zoro. Law uses his powers to swap places with Zoro and strike at Kaido, but knocked back. This allows Prometheus and Napoleon to escape, while Zeus is still trapped in the box. Prometheus and Napoleon dive into the sea, rescue Big Mom and carry her back to Onigashima. Kid and Killer break off from the group to deal with Big Mom. On the way back to the floating island, Big Mom thanks Prometheus and Napoleon for rescuing her, but gets angry at Zeus for not coming to her aid. Prometheus, no longer wanting to share his power with Zeus, suggests that Big Mom abandons him and creates a new homie to be his girlfriend, which she agrees to. While they rise to the island, the Heart Pirates watch her from the Polar Tang, angry that she survived. Kaido prepares to finish off an unconscious Luffy, but Zoro prepares to use the last of his strength to take him down. Zoro, using Nine Sword Style, slashes Kaido's chest leaving a grievous wound. Seeing his wound, Kaido questions Zoro if he has Conqueror's Haki. Zoro doesn't know what he is talking about as he falls down, saying that he had hoped that attack would have brought Kaido down to the ground. Kaido, however, tells Zoro that his attack will definitely leave a scar. Kaido then retaliates and when Law tries to aid Zoro, he, too, is struck down. Kaido considers it a pity that they did not decide to work for him, but Luffy, having regain consciousness, stands firm on their choice to ally with the samurai, and once again swears to defeat Kaido.
1028	137	"Surpass the Emperor of the Sea! Luffy Strikes Back with an Iron Fist!"; Transliteration: "Yonkō o Koero – Rufi Hangeki no Tekken" (Japanese: 四皇を超えろ ルフィ反撃の鉄拳)	Yasunori Koyama	Shōji Yonemura	Kazuya Hisada	August 7, 2022
Luffy's declaration angers Kaido. Meanwhile, Big Mom takes out a fragment of her soul and gives it to the thundercloud above, creating a new homie to replace Zeus. As her first technique, this new homie fires a powerful lightning bolt at Kid and Killer, hitting them at near point-blank range and shaking the entire island. Meanwhile, Nami, Tama, and Usopp attempt to return to the Performance Floor on Komachiyo while Page One chases them. Page One transforms into his Human-Beast Form and leaps onto Komachiyo's back, but Komachiyo begins to speed up, running into a wall at full speed and ramming Page One into it. Kid and Killer emerge from the rubble somewhere inside the castle. Big Mom is on the floor directly below them, still in pursuit of Kid. Suddenly, they are attacked by Hawkins, and Kid becomes enraged that Hawkins abandoned Kid in favour of Kaido. Killer convinces Kid to advance towards Big Mom while he stays behind to battles Hawkins, who transforms into a scarecrow-like figure. Back on the roof, Luffy admits all the attacks he used on Kaido were shallow, but after being struck with his kanabō, Luffy realized the truth behind Kaido's strength: Kaido can infuse objects with Conqueror's Haki. Kaido laughs in confirmation as he charges at Luffy, revealing that only a select few powerful individuals can pull it off as he brings his club down on Luffy. Remembering Hyogoro's lessons and the defeats he'd experienced in the past, Luffy infuses Conqueror's Haki into his limbs and blocks the attack with his foot without even touching it. With this, Luffy strikes Kaido's stomach without touching him, then unleashes a powerful uppercut knocking Kaido over. As Law is left in disbelief that Luffy did damage without actually touching Kaido, Luffy thanks both him and Zoro for covering him, but tells them to go back downstairs, declaring that he can handle the rest and he will beat Kaido no matter what.
Uta's Past
1029	138	"A Faint Memory! Luffy and Red-Haired's Daughter Uta!"; Transliteration: "Awai Kioku – Rufi to Akagami no Musume Uta" (Japanese: 淡い記憶 ルフィと赤髪の娘ウタ)	Shigeyasu Yamauchi	Akiko Inoue	Shaolei Li	August 14, 2022
While at sea the Straw Hat Pirates listen to the hit song 'New Genesis'. Meanwhile, Uta stands on a cliff, staring out into the ocean and thinking about her childhood. 12 years ago in Windmill Village, a seven year-old Luffy constantly wishes for a life of freedom all the while refusing his grandfather Garp's desire for him to become a Marine. One day, the Red Hair Pirate come ashore and Luffy meets Shanks for the first time, along with the Red Hair Pirates' musician and Shanks' nine-year-old daughter, Uta. While the two children initially do not get along, due to Luffy's constantly asking to join Shanks' crew and Uta's spoiled behavior, the two eventually formed a friendship. Back in the present day, Uta states that she will realise her dream, and continues to look out over the ocean.
1030	139	"A Pledge for the Next Genesis! Luffy and Uta!"; Transliteration: "Shin Jidai no Chikai! Rufi to Uta" (Japanese: 新時代の誓い！ルフィとウタ)	Katsumi Tokoro	Ryo Yamazaki	Kenji Yokoyama	August 21, 2022
Luffy and Uta constantly compete during their childhood, forming a friendly yet fiery rivalry. After one challenge, Uta reveals her dream of traveling the world with Shanks, spreading happiness through her singing. When the Red Hair Pirates depart, Luffy promises Uta that one day he'll grow strong enough to join Shanks' crew. However, when the pirates later return, Uta is gone. Shanks claims she left to pursue a singing career, but Luffy doubts this, believing something terrible happened. Frustrated by Shanks' silence, Luffy storms off, severing ties with him. Soon after, the destruction of Elegia becomes world news—every resident reportedly dead, and Shanks falsely blamed. Back in Windmill Village, Beckman urges Luffy to forgive Shanks, reminding him that some truths cannot yet be told. Still angry, Luffy retreats into the mountains, where bandits—enemies from his and Uta's past—attack him. Beckman rescues him and brings him home safely. The next day, Luffy once again asks to join Shanks' crew but is rejected. Sitting among the pirates, he tells Shanks he won't pry into what happened with Uta—it's between them. In the present, Usopp informs Luffy that Uta is hosting her first live concert. Intrigued, Luffy decides they'll attend. On Elegia, Uta prepares for her grand performance, declaring that a new genesis is about to begin—setting the stage for One Piece Film: Red.
Wano Country
1031	140	"Nami Screams – A Deadly Death Race!"; Transliteration: "Nami Zekkyō – Zettai Zetsumei Desu Rēsu!" (Japanese: ナミ絶叫 絶体絶命デスレース！)	Satoshi Itō	Ryo Yamazaki	Shūichi Itō	September 4, 2022
As Big Mom's new homie attacks Kid and Killer, the energy shock collapses Zeus's prison, finally freeing him. Following Luffy's instructions, Law teleports himself and Zoro to a lower level—bringing Zeus along to keep him from reuniting with Big Mom. Meanwhile, Momonosuke, Yamato, and Shinobu hide in the castle ceiling. They contact Kin'emon, assuring him that Momonosuke is safe and sharing their location so he can regroup with them. Yamato, preparing for their next plan, gathers sewing supplies. Elsewhere, Usopp, Nami, and Tama are chased through the corridors by Page One, who rides on Komachiyo's back. Usopp is frustrated that Tama's Kibi Dango power cannot affect non-SMILE Zoans, but Tama insists she must reach the Performance Floor to command her allies. Usopp fires Pop Greens, knocking Page One off Komachiyo, but the Tobi Roppo continues to pursue them relentlessly. Suddenly, Big Mom appears. Though initially hostile, her demeanor softens upon seeing Tama, entering her nurturing "Mother Mode." Remembering how the villagers of Okobore Town once cared for her, Big Mom listens as Tama explains that Kaido's forces, led by Holdem, burned the town and injured many, including Tsuru. Outraged, Big Mom turns on Kaido's men. When Page One lunges at them again, Big Mom strikes him down with a Conqueror's Haki–infused punch, knocking him out instantly and alerting Kid and Zeus to her location.
1032	141	"The Dawn of the Land of Wano – The All-Out Battle Heats Up!"; Transliteration: "Wano Kuni no Yoake – Zenmen Taiketsu Gekika!" (Japanese: ワノ国の夜明け 全面対決激化！)	Directed by : Tasuku Shimaya; Storyboarded by : Yutaka Nakashima & Tasuku Shimaya	Atsuhiro Tomioka	Masayuki Takagi	September 11, 2022
The Akazaya Nine regroup and rush to protect Momonosuke from Kanjuro. Kikunojo reflects that losing her arm hurt less than when Izou left her. The samurai then decide to split up to reinforce different parts of the battlefield, though Kiku stays with Kin'emon to pursue Kanjuro. Elsewhere, Cat Viper learns the truth of Pedro's death and that Perospero, his killer, is on Onigashima. Furious, he leaves to aid Wanda and Carrot in avenging their fallen comrade. Meanwhile, Yamato creates a decoy of Momonosuke to divert the Marys, drawing their attention away from the real one. Hiding in a crawl space, Momonosuke suddenly hears Luffy's voice, sensing that he is fighting Kaido one-on-one atop the roof. The two clash evenly, their blows shaking the island. Inside the castle, Sanji carries a heavily injured Zoro on his back, battling through waves of Gifters and Pleasures while Zoro recovers. On the Performance Floor, Chopper faces Queen, but Perospero's interference with his candy arrows angers Queen, who demands to fight alone. Meanwhile, Ulti, enraged by Page One's defeat, attacks Big Mom and knocks down Komachiyo. When Tama tries to intervene, Ulti strikes her, provoking fury from both Nami and Big Mom. Enraged, Nami unleashes lightning from her Clima-Tact, vowing to defeat Ulti herself.
1033	142	"The Conclusion! Luffy, Accelerating Fist of the Conqueror"; Transliteration: "Ketchaku! Rufi Kasoku Suru Haō no Kobushi" (Japanese: 決着！ルフィ加速する覇王の拳)	Ryōsuke Tanaka	Akiko Inoue	Masahiro Kitazaki, Kimitaka Itō & Yong-Ce Tu	September 18, 2022
Sanji carries the heavily injured Zoro through Onigashima's halls, grumbling about having to haul someone with a lower bounty. He recalls the moment Law teleported Zoro to safety earlier, instructing Sanji to care for him while his team moved elsewhere. Though annoyed, Sanji reluctantly bandaged Zoro's wounds and continued carrying him toward the Performance Floor, where they encounter Kawamatsu and Izou and decide to join the main battle. Meanwhile, on the rooftop, Luffy and Kaido continue their ferocious duel. Their strikes shatter the floor beneath them, and Luffy nearly falls off the island before recovering. Refusing to yield, Luffy proclaims that he will restore the Kouzuki Family, liberate Wano, and become the King of the Pirates. Elsewhere inside the castle, Ulti recovers and attacks Nami, but Big Mom intervenes, fusing her homies—Prometheus, Napoleon, and the new thundercloud Hera—into one weapon. They unleash Maser Cannon, blasting Ulti and knocking her unconscious. Watching from the corner, Zeus feels betrayed, realizing Hera disrespects even Big Mom's other homies. When Zeus approaches Big Mom, hoping to rejoin her, she coldly rejects him, declaring he's been replaced. Back above, Kaido ultimately overwhelms Luffy, striking him unconscious and hurling him off Onigashima. Reverting to human form, Kaido laments not taking his head, knowing Luffy's allies will keep their faith alive.
1034	143	"Luffy, Defeated! The Straw Hats in Jeopardy?!"; Transliteration: "Rufi Haiboku! Mugiwara no Ichimi Kyūchi!?" (Japanese: ルフィ敗北！麦わらの一味窮地!?)	Satohiko Sano	Shinzō Fujita	Masahiko Inuzuka & Satohiko Sano	September 25, 2022
As Luffy plummets into the sea, Kaido watches coldly, acknowledging Luffy's use of Conqueror's Haki yet dismissing him as sloppy and unworthy, declaring he will never become Joy Boy. Inside the palace, Big Mom rejects Zeus, ordering Hera to devour him and absorb his soul for more power. Realizing his end is near, Zeus desperately seeks Nami's forgiveness, but she refuses, still angry at his past cowardice. In a final act of defiance, Zeus attacks Big Mom but is effortlessly subdued, his soul ripped from his body. Nami tries to save him by feeding him Black Balls, yet both they and Zeus are consumed by Hera. On the Performance Floor, Queen and Perospero battle Chopper and the rebel Gifters, with Perospero unleashing a barrage of candy arrows that devastate the field. Fueled by rage, Chopper manages to slam Queen into the floor and hurl him into a wall, but Queen remains unscathed while Chopper grows exhausted. Meanwhile, Yamato continues running through the halls with a fake Momonosuke, defeating Gifters fooled by the decoy. The real Momonosuke hides in a crawl space, reading Oden's journal and learning of his father's pirate adventures. He suddenly hears a strange voice, unaware that a Mary is spying on him. Bao Huang reports his location to Kaido, who decides to personally capture him. As Hera gains new power, Big Mom targets Nami's group—only for Kid to arrive and challenge her head-on.
1035	144	"The Beasts Trample Down! The End of the Kouzuki Family!"; Transliteration: "Hyakujū Jūrin! Kōzuki-ke no Shūen!" (Japanese: 百獣蹂躙！光月家の終焉！)	Directed by : Shō Inuzuka; Storyboarded by : Yutaka Nakashima	Hitoshi Tanaka	Masahiro Shimanuki	October 2, 2022
As Momonosuke reacts to the mysterious voice, Shinobu panics, leading Kin'emon and Kikunojo to locate them. On the Performance Floor, Chopper continues shielding everyone from Perospero's relentless candy arrows. During the fight, he recalls Caesar Clown offering to extend his Rumble Ball transformation from three to thirty minutes. Though Chopper hesitated due to potential side effects, he eventually agreed after Caesar reminded him of the powerful foes ahead. In the present, with less than ten minutes of his transformation remaining, Chopper charges back into battle but is overwhelmed by Queen. Suddenly, Bao Huang announces the outcome of Luffy and Kaido's duel, declaring Kaido the victor. The announcement shocks both sides of the war as Bao Huang declares Kaido's intent to purge the remaining samurai and pirates, offering the enemy a chance to surrender—an offer none accept. Elsewhere, Kanjuro, disguised as Oden, finds Momonosuke and Shinobu. While they are deceived by his act, Kin'emon and Kikunojo immediately recognize the imposter and intervene. Kikunojo attempts to avenge Ashura Dōji, but memories of the real Oden distract her, allowing Kanjuro to stab her fatally. Enraged, Kin'emon duels Kanjuro, defeating him after a heartfelt exchange about their shared past. Moments later, Kaido crashes through the ceiling, confronting them. Kin'emon stands his ground but is struck down by Kaido's kanabō as Momonosuke watches in horror.
1036	145	"Fight Against the Dark Night – The Commander-in-chief of the Land of Wano Sounds Off"; Transliteration: "Yamiyo ni Aragae – Wano Kuni Sōdaishō Hoeru" (Japanese: 闇夜に抗え ワノ国総大将吠える)	Yusuke Suzuki	Tomohiro Nakayama	Shigefumi Shingaki	October 16, 2022
As Luffy sinks into the ocean, Chopper continues battling Queen, his spirit shaken by Bao Huang's announcement of Luffy's defeat. Across Onigashima, reactions are divided—some despair while others refuse to believe the news. The island itself finally reaches the Wano mainland, intensifying the stakes. Though morale wanes, the Nine Red Scabbards continue fighting fiercely. Izou notes they cannot confirm Luffy's death, while Kawamatsu laments how the rumor alone weakens resolve. Sanji, however, angrily rejects the notion that Luffy lost, urging everyone to keep faith in their captain. On the Performance Floor, Queen overpowers Chopper while Perospero rains arrows upon the samurai, taunting them to surrender. Just as Queen prepares to bite Chopper with his retractable fangs, Sanji arrives and kicks Queen so hard that his head spins, deflecting Perospero's arrows and sending the candy pirate flying. Sanji praises Chopper for holding out and entrusts Zoro to him before declaring he'll face Queen himself, inspiring awe in the samurai. Above the first floor, Kaido defeats Kin'emon, who still musters the strength to stab him with a broken sword, buying time for Shinobu and Momonosuke to flee. Mortally wounded, Kin'emon recalls his bond with Momonosuke and urges him to live on. Fleeing, Momonosuke bravely uses a Mary to declare that Luffy still lives—and commands everyone to keep fighting until he returns.
1037	146	"Believe in Luffy! The Alliance's Counterattack Begins!"; Transliteration: "Rufi o Shinjiro! Dōmei Hangeki Kaishi!" (Japanese: ルフィを信じろ！同盟反撃開始！)	Masahiro Hosoda	Shōji Yonemura	Keita Saitō & Toshio Deguchi	October 23, 2022
As Luffy sinks into the sea, Momonosuke uses a Mary to announce his survival and declare that Luffy will defeat Kaido, reigniting hope across Onigashima. Warriors on the Performance Floor rally with renewed morale. However, Kaido pursues Momonosuke and Shinobu, forcing them to flee. Before Kaido can crush them, Shinobu uses her powers to collapse the floor, sending them both into the ocean below. Elsewhere, Bao Huang and Horseman announce the pair's fall to demoralize the samurai. Meanwhile, Nami, Usopp, and Tama race toward the Performance Floor to let Tama command the SMILE users she tamed. Nami's Clima-Tact suddenly speaks, revealing Zeus's consciousness fused into it after Big Mom absorbed him. Though startled, Nami accepts him as her new partner. At the same time, Kid prepares to face Big Mom until Law arrives, proposing a temporary alliance to take her down. In the Flower Capital, citizens celebrate the Fire Festival, with Toko wondering if her late father watches over her. Back on Onigashima, CP0 assess the battle: the Beasts Pirates have 20,000 fighters remaining, while the Alliance has 7,000. Nami's group bursts onto the Performance Floor, interrupting Bao Huang's announcement. Ulti ambushes Usopp and seizes Tama, but Nami and Zeus strike back, launching a powerful lightning attack.
1038	147	"Nami's Lethal Attack! Otama's Desperate Challenge!"; Transliteration: "Nami Hissatsu! Otama Kesshi no Ōichiban!" (Japanese: ナミ必殺！お玉決死の大一番！)	Directed by : Nanami Michibata; Storyboarded by : Kōhei Kureta & Nanami Michibata	Ryo Yamazaki	Kazuya Hisada	October 30, 2022
The Heart Pirates discover the unconscious Luffy sinking into the sea and quickly retrieve him with their submarine. They pump the swallowed water from his stomach, working desperately to revive him. Meanwhile, as Shinobu and Momonosuke plummet from Onigashima, Shinobu deploys a kite, allowing them to glide safely to Wano's mainland. Upon landing, Momonosuke breaks down in tears, fearing for Kin'emon and Kiku after witnessing their injuries. Back on Onigashima, Ulti corners Tama, but Nami intervenes. Zeus offers to strike with lightning, though Nami hesitates, fearing it would harm Tama. Usopp separates Tama from Ulti, giving Nami an opening. When Nami creates a thundercloud, Zeus merges with it, transforming into the storm itself. He redirects a Lightning Blast, striking Ulti directly and knocking her out. Bao Huang, in a panic, accidentally broadcasts Ulti's and Page One's defeats over the Marys system, spreading panic among the Beast Pirates. Usopp seizes the chance to capture Horsea and Bao Huang, informing Tama that Bao is a transmitter. Using the system, Tama rallies all Gifters under her control to aid the Alliance. Elsewhere, Yamato rejects Kaido's offer to rule Wano beside him. Declaring she will sail freely, Yamato clashes with her father, determined to hold him off until Luffy returns.
1039	148	"A Dramatic Increase of Allies! Straw Hats Fight Back!"; Transliteration: "Mikata Gekizō! Mugiwara no Ichimi Gyakushū!" (Japanese: 味方激増！麦わらの一味逆襲！)	Kenichi Takeshita	Atsuhiro Tomioka	Kenji Yokoyama	November 6, 2022
Across Onigashima, chaos erupts as Tama's dango takes effect — countless Gifters betray the Beast Pirates and turn on their comrades. A Mary reports the mass defection to CP0, who coldly observe as the battle descends into disorder. The Alliance cheers their new advantage while the Beast Pirates reel in confusion. On the Performance Floor, Queen targets Nami, Tama, and Usopp for causing the rebellion, but his shot is intercepted when Sanji kicks him in the face, forcing him to fire into his own mouth. Queen greets Sanji mockingly as Judge's son, revealing that he and Judge were both part of MADS, a notorious science group. As Queen transforms into his Human-Beast Form, the surrounding pirates panic, but Sanji ignores him, confirming with Chopper that Zoro will recover. Chopper, however, has entered his "Baby Geezer" form after overusing the Rumble Ball. As Sanji and Queen clash, Miyagi tells Chopper of a Zou medicine that can instantly heal Zoro, though it doubles pain afterward. Chopper hesitates, but Zoro demands it, determined to fight again. Elsewhere, CP0 updates their calculations—about 300 Gifters have defected. As Nami, Usopp, and Tama flee through the halls, Daifugo, Speed, and Gazelleman rescue them. Meanwhile, Jinbe confronts Who's-Who, who reveals his past as a CP9 agent disgraced for losing the Gum-Gum Fruit 13 years ago.
1040	149	"The Pride of a Helmsman? The Enraged Jimbei!"; Transliteration: "Sōdashu no Hokori – Ikari no Jinbē!" (Japanese: 操舵手の誇り 怒りのジンベエ！)	Katsumi Tokoro	Akiko Inoue	Shūichi Itō	November 13, 2022
As Speed carries Tama, Nami, and Usopp through Onigashima, with Gazelleman and Daifugo defending them and recovering Komachiyo, Zeus begs to rejoin Nami. She refuses to take him as an attendant, instead offering partnership—an equal bond he joyfully accepts. Elsewhere, CP0 analyzes the battle's balance: 2,000 Beast Pirates have defected to the alliance thanks to Tama's powers, and another 2,000 are incapacitated, leaving the sides at 16,000 vs. 9,000. Yet, they consider it irrelevant, noting their only mission is confirming Who's-Who's death as punishment for betraying CP9. Meanwhile, Jinbe confronts Who's-Who, who reveals his hatred for Luffy stems from the Gum-Gum Fruit—the very one stolen from him years ago by Shanks. Their fight intensifies as Who's-Who brings up the legend of Nika, the Sun God, a legendary mythical liberator of slaves. He asks Jinbe about Nika, linking the story to the Fish-Men's history of enslavement, and wonders if knowledge of Nika is itself forbidden, noting a prison guard was executed for mentioning him. Jinbe refuses to answer, declaring he won't tolerate racial mockery. He crushes Who's-Who's hand, pins his tail, and finishes him with Fish-Man Karate Secret Art: Demon Brick Fist, ending their battle.
1041	150	"Showdown Battles of the Monsters! Yamato and Franky"; Transliteration: "Kaijū Dai Kessen! Yamato to Furankī" (Japanese: 怪獣大決戦！ヤマトとフランキー)	Directed by : Tasuku Shimaya; Storyboarded by : Yutaka Nakashima & Tasuku Shimaya	Shinzō Fujita	Masayuki Takagi	November 20, 2022
Kaido and Yamato fiercely clash atop Onigashima, as Yamato declares her desire to sever ties with her father. Kaido refuses to accept this and instead insists Yamato become Shogun of Wano under his rule. Yamato defies him, proclaiming faith in Luffy, promising to protect Wano until his return. Transforming into his Human-Beast Form, Yamato stands resolute. On the Performance Floor, Queen relentlessly attacks Sanji, boasting about his cybernetic modifications and firing lasers from his claws, tail, and braid. Sanji, unimpressed by Queen's antics, enrages him further as he effortlessly dodges the blasts. Meanwhile, Zoro demands Chopper and Miyagi administer the miracle drug, determined to rejoin the battle despite its risks. Elsewhere, Tama's controlled Gifters aid Franky, driving away the Beast Pirates. As Franky and Sasaki trade blows, both acknowledge each other's toughness. Sasaki transforms into his Human-Beast Form, spinning his frilled neck like a propeller to fly. The two engage in an intense clash, with Franky using General Shield to block Sasaki's charge. Though Sasaki damages General Franky's thrusters, Franky counters by grabbing and suplexing him into the ground. Out at sea, the Heart Pirates frantically attempt to revive Luffy, who finally awakens—immediately demanding meat.
1042	151	"The Predator's Trap - Black Maria's Temptation"; Transliteration: "Hoshokusha no Wana - Burakku Maria no Yūwaku" (Japanese: 捕食者の罠 ブラックマリアの誘惑)	Shigeyasu Yamauchi	Hitoshi Tanaka	Shaolei Li, Takuya Imakado, Mami Kotoku & Zhenlei Cheng	November 27, 2022
Yamato and Kaido continue their fierce rooftop clash, with Yamato firmly rejecting Kaido's repeated offer to become Shogun of Wano. Meanwhile, Franky battles Sasaki, noting the wound on his opponent's stomach. Franky attempts another strike, but Sasaki dodges, and the fight turns into a sword duel. Sasaki shatters Franky's blade and slices part of General Franky's left shoulder, forcing Franky to retreat. Nearing the Performance Floor, Franky decides to stand his ground and fires the General Cannon, but Sasaki endures the hit and dive-bombs him, heavily damaging the mech. Ejected from the cockpit, Franky counters with a Radical Beam directly into Sasaki's stomach, defeating the Tobi Roppo. Back atop Onigashima, Kaido expresses regret that Yamato consumed the Dog-Dog Fruit, Model: Okuchi no Makami, a Mythical Zoan regarded as Wano's guardian deity. Once again, he urges Yamato to rule beside him, but Yamato defiantly refuses and retaliates with icy blasts, which Kaido incinerates with fire. Inside the castle, Robin and Brook wander through fog, encountering illusory figures of Olvia, Saul, and Clover. Realizing they're tricks conjured by Black Maria's minions, Robin destroys them, recalling her mother's and Luffy's words. She declares proudly that she has friends and chooses to live.
1043	152	"Slash the Nightmare - Brook Draws His Freezing Sword!"; Transliteration: "Akumu o Kiru - Burukku no Kōri no Battō!" (Japanese: 悪夢を斬る ブルックの氷の抜刀！)	Directed by : Shō Matsui; Storyboarded by : Yutaka Nakashima	Tomohiro Nakayama	Masahiro Kitazaki	December 4, 2022
Robin flees from Black Maria's Gifters and is joined by Brook, relieved she wasn't deceived by the Illusion Mist. Black Maria ambushes them, prompting Robin to note Brook's resistance. Brook explains he saw his deceased Rumbar Pirates crewmates but recognized the illusion—he had spent decades hallucinating their presence in the Florian Triangle, making him immune. Cutting down enemies hidden in the mirage, he and Robin continue running, reflecting on their shared resilience. Maria attacks using Wanyudo, a flaming wheel powered by a Pug SMILE user. The floor ignites, but Robin lifts them to safety by grabbing the ceiling. Realizing Wanyudo is alive, Brook sends his soul through it, freezing the creature and dousing the flames. Maria taunts Robin, claiming Sanji betrayed her by calling for help. Brook refutes this by entrusting Maria to Robin and turning to fight the underlings. Robin defends Sanji's faith in her, manifesting a giant clone to grapple Maria. Maria retaliates, slicing Robin's limbs, the damage echoing onto her real body, before binding Robin's arms with threads to halt her movements. Meanwhile, on Wano's mainland, Momonosuke, Shinobu, and the Heart Pirates reunite with Luffy, who devours all their provisions. After Caribou offers more food, Luffy urges Momonosuke to transform into a dragon and fly him back to Onigashima.
1044	153	"Clutch! A Demon Incarnate, Robin!"; Transliteration: "Kuratchi! Akuma no Keshin - Robin!" (Japanese: クラッチ！悪魔の化身 ロビン！)	Yasunori Koyama	Shōji Yonemura	Masahiro Shimanuki & Ziwei He	December 11, 2022
Black Maria traps Robin's giant form in webs and savagely beats her with brass knuckles. Robin dispels her technique and forms massive arms behind Black Maria, but her attack is blocked as Maria ignites her webs, surrounding Robin in flames. Forced to evade, Robin is eventually ensnared again. Maria mocks her, saying she's only valuable for reading Poneglyphs, triggering Robin's memories of her lonely childhood and persecution. Brook warns Maria to run and erects an ice wall to block her subordinates. Recalling her Revolutionary Army training, Robin combines her powers with Fish-Man Karate, summoning a colossal arm to strike the ceiling, collapsing debris that extinguishes the fire. Freeing herself, she manifests a new and monstrous form—Demonio Fleur—complete with multiple arms. She traps Black Maria in a powerful Grand Jacuzzi Clutch, knocking her unconscious. Hearing Maria's screams, her underlings panic but are quickly frozen and defeated by Brook. He then catches Robin as she collapses from exhaustion, while a Mary secretly observes the battle's outcome. On Wano's mainland, Luffy regains strength after eating food from Caribou. Confidently, he tells the Heart Pirates their captain still lives. Meanwhile, Momonosuke insists Shinobu use her powers to age him into an adult, ignoring her warnings it cannot be undone—believing it's Wano's only hope.
1045	154	"A Spell! Kid and Zoro Facing Threats!"; Transliteration: "Jubaku! Semaru Kyōi - Kiddo to Zoro!" (Japanese: 呪縛！迫る脅威 キッドとゾロ！)	Yūji Tokuno	Atsuhiro Tomioka	Shigefumi Shingaki	December 18, 2022
A Mary reports Black Maria's defeat to CP0 as Raizo clashes with Fukurokuju, who attacks using his elongated earlobes as whips. Fukurokuju mocks Raizo's emotions as unbecoming of a ninja, but Raizo counters that those emotions define him and his comrades, vowing they will end Kaido and Orochi's tyranny and make Momonosuke shogun. Meanwhile, on Wano's mainland, Shinobu uses her powers to age Momonosuke into an adult, weeping at his transformation. Elsewhere, Killer's battle with Hawkins intensifies. Though Killer lands hits, Hawkins' Straw-Straw Fruit allows him to redirect damage to others—specifically Kid. When Killer stabs Hawkins, Kid is wounded in his concurrent fight with Big Mom. Hawkins reveals he's hidden Kid's straw doll inside his body, leaving Killer unable to strike without harming his captain. On the Performance Floor, Sanji struggles against both King and Queen while Zoro continues healing, awaiting the drug's effects. Marco nears his limit, and Perospero targets Sanji with his candy arrows. However, Cat Viper intervenes, striking Perospero from the castle. King and Queen regain control, knocking Sanji down. While Queen punishes defected Gifters, King hunts for the immobilized Zoro, halting Chopper's group from escaping with him as the medicine's effects remain dormant.
1046	155	"Taking a Chance! The Two Arms Go into Battle!"; Transliteration: "Ichikabachika no Ōshōbu! Ryōyoku Shutsujin!" (Japanese: 一か八かの大勝負！両翼出陣！)	Shō Inuzuka	Shinzō Fujita	Keita Saitō & Toshio Deguchi	January 8, 2023
King intercepts Chopper's group as they carry the injured Zoro, but Sanji rushes in to defend—only to be struck by Queen's laser. Before King can finish them off, Marco blocks his attack, revealing he once heard of a race capable of igniting themselves who lived atop the Red Line, identifying King as one of them. When Queen joins in, Marco withdraws, confident in Zoro's recovery after taking Miyagi's drug. Zoro immediately deflects Queen's strike, teaming up with Sanji to engage both Lead Performers. The two declare that winning this battle will bring them closer to seeing Luffy become the King of the Pirates. Hyogoro orders the samurai not to interfere as Kawamatsu arrives. Marco, dazed by memories of Whitebeard telling him that Mary Geoise was once called the "Land of Gods," snaps back when Izo saves him from enemy fire. During the fierce battle, Sanji notices his body changing since wearing his Raid Suit, while Queen claims Sanji must be a modified human like his siblings. Zoro clashes with King, whose jagged blade traps Zoro's swords before striking him with a spiked gauntlet. Zoro recovers, vowing not to lose. Watching, Hyogoro and Kawamatsu note Zoro's uncanny resemblance to Shimotsuki Ushimaru, descendant of Ryuma. Meanwhile, in Tokage Port, Luffy regains his strength—just as two enormous eyes emerge from the shadows.
1047	156	"Ascend to the Dawn! A Pink Dragon Gets Agitated"; Transliteration: "Yoake e to Nobore! Momoiro no Ryū Takeru" (Japanese: 夜明けへと昇れ！桃色の龍猛る)	Yutaka Nakashima	Hitoshi Tanaka	Kazuya Hisada	January 15, 2023
As flames spread throughout Onigashima, chaos erupts inside the castle. The Beast Pirates, fleeing the fire, rush toward the Performance Floor, where Sanji, Zoro, King, and Queen continue their brutal clashes. Hyogoro and Kawamatsu hold the line, stopping reinforcements from interfering. Nearby, after defeating Sasaki, Franky runs out of energy fighting off stragglers, prompting Bepo, Penguin, and Shachi to assist. On the second floor, Nami, Usopp, and Tama flee atop Speed, with Zeus trailing behind. As Beast Pirates close in, Usopp nearly falls but is saved when Big Mom's Conqueror's Haki, unleashed during her fight with Law and Kid, knocks out nearby enemies. Usopp boldly claims credit for the surge of power, rallying the remaining pirates to his side. Elsewhere, Brook carries an unconscious Robin through the inferno on the third floor, while Jinbe and Heat fend off enemies above. In the Treasure Repository, Dogstorm and Jack clash savagely until Dogstorm hurls Jack outside, exposing him to the moon and reawakening his Sulong form. Cat Viper, too, transforms and faces Perospero, vowing to avenge Pedro. Outside Tokage Port, the Heart Pirates panic at the sight of a massive pink dragon—until Luffy confirms it's Momonosuke, now aged to 28 by Shinobu's powers. Together, they soar toward Onigashima, ready to reclaim Wano.
1048	157	"For the Future! Yamato and the Great Swordsmen's Pledge"; Transliteration: "Mirai e! Yamato to Dai Kengō no Chikai" (Japanese: 未来へ！ヤマトと大剣豪の誓い)	Ryōsuke Tanaka	Tomohiro Nakayama	Kenji Yokoyama	January 22, 2023
Riding atop Momonosuke, Luffy charges toward Kaido, but Momonosuke's fear of heights gets the better of him once he realizes they're airborne, sending them crashing down. Meanwhile, Yamato continues clashing with Kaido, recalling the moment that forever changed her life. As a child, Yamato witnessed Oden's execution and was deeply moved by his bravery and sacrifice for his retainers. Inspired, she rampaged through Kaido's castle, knocking out numerous Beast Pirates with Conqueror's Haki before being captured and chained by her father. Kaido imprisoned Yamato in the Sacred Cave alongside three rebellious daimyō. Though Yamato feared they would kill her for being Kaido's child, the samurai instead treated her with kindness, sharing their meager rations and freeing her from her chains. Among the rubble of Oden Castle, Yamato had found Oden's journal, which the four read together, learning of the dawn Oden foresaw twenty years ahead. After ten days, realizing Kaido had no intention of freeing them, the samurai attempted to escape, choosing to die as warriors rather than rot away, trusting Yamato to carry on Oden's will. In the present, Yamato channels their faith and fury, demanding to know why Kaido steals freedom from both her and Wano. Their Conqueror's Haki collides violently as Kaido coldly replies that life offers no simple answers.
1049	158	"Luffy Soars! Revenge Against the King of the Beasts"; Transliteration: "Rufi Hishō! Hyakujū e no Ribenji" (Japanese: ルフィ飛翔！百獣へのリベンジ)	Yusuke Suzuki	Shōji Yonemura	Shūichi Itō	January 29, 2023
Luffy urges Momonosuke to fly toward Onigashima, but the young dragon is paralyzed by his fear of heights. Meanwhile, on the rooftop, Yamato continues battling Kaido, managing to draw blood. Coating his body in ice to block Kaido's attacks, Yamato declares she will not die until Luffy returns. Kaido mocks Yamato's determination, sneering that Wano's people will never accept her as an ally since she is still his child. He laughs cruelly, adding that Yamato doesn't even have friends. Yamato rebukes him, remembering Ace, who once befriended her during her visit to Wano. She also recalls when, as a starving child, one of Kaido's men secretly gave her food and warmth—only to be executed when Kaido found out. Kaido argues that everyone who was kind to Yamato died because they interfered with his "education." Yamato angrily retorts that it was Kaido's cruelty that killed them all. Back at Tokage Port, Luffy impatiently yanks Momonosuke's whiskers, forcing him into the air. Terrified, Momonosuke flies with his eyes closed, smashing through walls and ceilings as he blunders through Onigashima, stunning everyone. Finally opening his eyes, he reaches the rooftop, where Luffy and Yamato, both in human form, prepare a joint strike—Divine Swiftness: White Serpent and Gear Fourth: Jet Culverin—sending Kaido hurtling across the rooftop.
1050	159	"Two Dragons Face Off! Momonosuke's Determination!"; Transliteration: "Sōryū Aiutsu! Momonosuke no Kakugo!" (Japanese: 双竜相搏つ！モモの助の覚悟！)	Masahiro Hosoda	Ryo Yamazaki	Masayuki Takagi	February 5, 2023
After sending Kaido flying, Luffy thanks Yamato for holding him off, and Yamato expresses relief that he's finally arrived. Kaido soon reappears in his dragon form, completely unharmed and shocked that Luffy survived their last fight. Spotting the pink dragon, Kaido demands to know who he is. Though terrified, Momonosuke bravely declares himself Kouzuki Momonosuke, the future Shogun of Wano. Meanwhile, in the Flower Capital, the citizens celebrate the Fire Festival, unaware of the battle raging above. Toko and Hitetsu enjoy the festivities; Toko fondly recalls her father Yasuie, while Hitetsu silently worries for Tama's safety. Across Onigashima, a Mary broadcasts updates from the rooftop, and the Straw Hats rejoice at their captain's return. Elsewhere, Dogstorm and Cat Viper appear to dominate Jack and Perospero, but clouds obscure the full moon, stripping them of their Sulong forms. Weakened, both Minks are cornered as their opponents prepare finishing blows. On the rooftop, Kaido prepares a Blast Breath toward Momonosuke. Luffy urges him to counterattack, but the young dragon hesitates. Instead, Luffy tells him to bite Kaido. Remembering his family's suffering, Momonosuke summons his courage and sinks his teeth into the Emperor. Kaido roars in fury, but Luffy punches him mid-attack, shouting his praise for Momonosuke, declaring that after biting an Emperor, nothing can ever scare him again.
1051	160	"A Legend All Over Again! Luffy's Fist Roars in the Sky"; Transliteration: "Densetsu no Sairai! Ten ni Todoroku Rufi no Kobushi" (Japanese: 伝説の再来！天に轟くルフィの拳)	Wataru Matsumi	Atsuhiro Tomioka	Masahiro Kitazaki	February 12, 2023
Luffy's defiant declaration from the Skull Dome rooftop reignites the alliance's morale, inspiring everyone still standing to fight with renewed vigor. Motivated by his words, Zoro and Sanji both surge in strength, gradually overpowering King and Queen. From the rubble, Kaido rises once more, returning to his Human-Beast Form after being bitten by Luffy. Kaido, amused, asks if Luffy truly believes he can defeat him. Luffy grins and replies that as long as he's alive, he has infinite chances. Their clash erupts again, their Conqueror's Haki colliding with such force that the sky itself splits open, clearing the clouds and unveiling the night sky. Watching in awe, Yamato recalls Oden's journal, which described the heavens splitting when Roger and Whitebeard once fought. Following Luffy's orders, Momonosuke and Yamato leap off the island to stop Onigashima's fall, leaving Luffy to keep Kaido occupied. Though initially struggling to create flame clouds, Momonosuke succeeds after Yamato's fierce encouragement, running across the sky to stabilize the island. The sky's opening reveals the full moon, allowing Dogstorm and Cat Viper to regain their Sulong forms. Empowered, they unleash Oden One Sword Style techniques—Dogstorm slays Jack, and Cat Viper cuts down Perospero. Nearby, Orochi, hiding in terror, realizes Kaido's empire is collapsing. Above, Luffy and Kaido continue their cataclysmic showdown.
1052	161	"The Situation Has Grown Tense! The End of Onigashima!"; Transliteration: "Fūun Kyū o Tsugeru! Onigashima no Matsuro!" (Japanese: 風雲急を告げる！鬼ヶ島の末路！)	Tasuku Shimaya	Akiko Inoue	Masahiro Shimanuki	February 19, 2023
Momonosuke and Yamato soar away from Onigashima, desperately trying to push the floating island back. They soon realize that Kaido's Flame Clouds—which keep the island aloft—are weakening along with him. If the clouds collapse, Onigashima will crash into the Flower Capital, detonating the massive stockpile of explosives inside and annihilating everything below. In panic, Momonosuke considers asking Luffy to stop fighting Kaido, but Yamato smacks him, reminding him that Luffy is already risking everything in that battle. She insists they must handle the crisis themselves. Momonosuke tries to physically push the island but fails, prompting Yamato to tell him that he must create his own Flame Clouds to hold Onigashima up. Inside the Performance Floor, fierce duels continue. Sanji battles Queen, while Zoro faces King. Queen lands a heavy strike, but Sanji is shocked that none of his bones are broken—his altered body growing sturdier by the moment. Zoro's flying slash slices off a spike from King's suit, cracking his mask for the first time. Enraged, King transforms into his Human-Beast form and unleashes devastating flying slashes that rip through the floor, even striking Queen. Zoro is blown into a hallway, pursued by King, where he slices off more of King's mask, exposing part of his dark scalp. King vows not to forgive Zoro, who replies in kind—their deadly rivalry fully ignited.
1053	162	"Sanji's Mutation? The Two Arms in Crisis!"; Transliteration: "Sanji no Ihen - Ryōyoku Kiiro Shingō!" (Japanese: サンジの異変 両翼黄色信号！)	Katsumi Tokoro	Shinzō Fujita	Shigefumi Shingaki	February 26, 2023
Momonosuke desperately tries to create Flame Clouds strong enough to move Onigashima, but they immediately disintegrate, leaving him panicked and frustrated. Yamato, realizing the island's explosives could amplify the destruction if it crashes into the Flower Capital, decides to leave him behind and secure the bombs instead. Meanwhile, Rob Lucci contacts the CP0 agents stationed on the island. The agents report that the Beast Pirates' forces have dwindled to 12,000, while the alliance now numbers 8,000. Lucci relays the World Government's plan—if Kaido is defeated, they will move in to annex Wano and make it a member nation, adding that reinforcements are en route. He also reminds them that Nico Robin remains a top-priority capture target. On the third floor, Brook and a newly conscious Robin continue fleeing from Beast Pirates trying to seize her. Back above, Yamato reaches the island's interior, transforms into her divine wolf form, and races toward the armory, trusting Momonosuke to succeed. Below, Sanji's battle with Queen rages on. Queen, in brachiosaurus form, uses Brachiosnakeus, detaching his head and tail to constrict and crush Sanji's body. He then fires his voice-activated missiles, but misfires and hits himself, freeing Sanji. Shockingly, Sanji emerges unharmed—his body regenerating as his bones snap back into place. When Queen's sword shatters against Sanji's neck, Sanji realizes, horrified, that he's awakening the genetic modifications of his Germa lineage.
1054	163	"Death to Your Partner! Killer's Deadly Gamble!"; Transliteration: "Aibō ni Shi o! Kirā Kesshi no Ōbakuchi" (Japanese: 相棒に死を！キラー決死の大博打)	Directed by : Yūji Tokuno & Yasunori Koyama; Storyboarded by : Yutaka Nakashima	Hitoshi Tanaka	Keita Saitō & Toshio Deguchi	March 19, 2023
Killer continues his brutal fight against Hawkins, but the odds are against him. Hawkins' Straw-Straw Fruit redirects all damage he receives to Kid, rendering Killer's attacks useless. When the Kid Pirates attempt to help, Killer forbids them, explaining the situation. Hawkins mocks him for eating a defective SMILE Fruit that prevents him from expressing emotion. As Killer refuses to strike back, Hawkins decides to torture Kid directly by smashing his own head into a pillar, transferring the pain to Kid mid-battle with Big Mom, leaving Law struggling to protect him. Desperate, Killer offers his life in exchange for Kid's safety, but Hawkins refuses, taunting him for following Kid instead of joining Kaido. Hawkins insists that Kid's defiance caused Killer's suffering, but Killer stands firm, declaring that Kid will become the King of the Pirates. Enraged, Hawkins beats him savagely until Killer counters with a single, decisive question—what happens if the damage has nowhere to go? He then slashes off Hawkins' left arm, revealing that Kid already lost his, nullifying Hawkins' power. Killer rips out the straw doll controlling Kid's fate and destroys it, freeing him. Cornered, Hawkins draws his "Death" card and summons a giant straw man, which Killer instantly decapitates. Hawkins' next draw, the "Tower" card, symbolizes the collapse of the old and the dawn of the new, as Killer finishes him with Spin & Sonic, defeating him.
1055	164	"A Shadowy Figure Pulls the Strings! Onigashima in Flames"; Transliteration: "Yami no Mono no An'yaku! Onigashima Enjō" (Japanese: 闇の者の暗躍！鬼ヶ島炎上)	Directed by : Hazuki Omoya; Storyboarded by : Kenichi Takeshita & Hazuki Omoya	Tomohiro Nakayama	Kazuya Hisada	March 26, 2023
After Queen's blade shatters against Sanji's neck, Sanji realizes he's developing genetic enhancements similar to his siblings. Horrified, he panics, suspecting his Raid Suit triggered the transformation. Even after being shot multiple times, he remains unharmed, but refuses to accept these powers due to his hatred of Germa 66. Meanwhile, Drake fights off Beast Pirates until Apoo proposes they form an alliance to defeat whoever survives the main battle. Apoo, flanked by the Numbers Inbi, Fuga, and Zanki, is met with Drake's distrust and rejection. Elsewhere, Nami, Usopp, Tama, her Gifters, and the wounded Komachiyo flee the flames and encounter Kin'emon's lower body, which can speak through farts but can't hear. Recognizing the crescent mark on his rear, Nami identifies him as an ally, and Usopp takes the legs to reunite him with his upper half. On the third floor, Brook and Robin are ambushed by Beast Pirates but saved by Mink warriors, only for CP0 agents to arrive in pursuit of Robin. In the attic, Kin'emon realizes he survived Kaido's blow because Law's surgery left his body improperly reattached. Nearby, a mortally wounded Kanjuro, following Orochi's final orders, paints a fiery ghost called Kazenbo, embodying the Kurozumi Clan's hatred. As it burns everything in its path, Orochi revels while Sanji, Zoro, and Luffy continue their decisive battles.
1056	165	"A Countercharge! Law and Kid's Return-Attack Combination"; Transliteration: "Gyakushū! Rō to Kiddo no Hangeki Dōmei" (Japanese: 逆襲！ローとキッドの反撃同盟)	Directed by : Shō Matsui; Storyboarded by : Yutaka Nakashima	Shōji Yonemura	Masahiro Kitazaki & Kimitaka Itō	April 2, 2023
As Momonosuke desperately struggles to generate Flame Clouds strong enough to support Onigashima, Yamato races toward the armory to secure the explosives before disaster strikes. Meanwhile, Law and Kid continue their desperate fight against Big Mom, but her powerful Homies—Prometheus, Napoleon, and Hera—block their every move. Realizing conventional attacks won't work, the two Supernovas decide to reveal their awakened Devil Fruit abilities despite the immense stamina drain. Kid insists they must go all out if they hope to win, urging Law to follow his lead. Elsewhere, under Orochi's orders, the fiery specter Kazenbo heads for the armory to ignite the stockpiled bombs and obliterate the island, while Orochi prepares to flee once Fukurokuju, still locked in combat with Raizo, returns. On the battlefield, Kid forms Punk Rotten to challenge Big Mom but is blasted away by Ikoku, crashing through the Performance Hall—right as Yamato arrives. Seeing an opening, Law activates his awakened power, forming a K ROOM, coating his sword and phasing it through Big Mom's neck before unleashing Shock Wille, stunning her and her Homies. Kid magnetizes Big Mom, then uses Punk Clash, crushing her beneath massive steel debris. Though finally injured, Big Mom rises enraged, consuming a year of her lifespan to grow stronger. Law and Kid, undeterred, vow to bring her down.
1057	166	"For Luffy - Sanji and Zoro's Oath"; Transliteration: "Rufi no Tame ni - Sanji to Zoro no Chikai" (Japanese: ルフィの為に サンジとゾロの誓い)	Directed by : Nanami Michibata; Storyboarded by : Nanami Michibata & Satoshi Itō	Ryo Yamazaki	Kenji Yokoyama	April 9, 2023
Apoo proposes an alliance with Drake to overthrow Kaido, arguing that the Emperor has never been weaker and that they should strike while he's vulnerable. Drake, however, refuses and attacks Apoo, unwilling to betray his sense of loyalty. Their skirmish is abruptly interrupted when Yamato bursts through, racing toward the armory to prevent Onigashima from exploding. Fuga, friendly toward Yamato, charges after her; Apoo, now trying to recruit her to his side, pursues them both; and Drake, in turn, chases Apoo. Elsewhere, CP0 agents move in to capture Nico Robin, but the Minks ambush them, buying time for Robin and Brook to escape. Meanwhile, Sanji flees from Queen after realizing that his body is mutating. Terrified that he's becoming a heartless Germa soldier like his brothers, he loses focus—only to find a woman, Some, injured and terrified, seemingly by his own hand. Distraught, Sanji offers help, but the geishas accuse him of attacking her and drive him away. Shaken, Sanji concludes that his transformation stems from repeated use of his Raid Suit. He decides to destroy it, choosing his humanity over power. Using a Transponder Snail, he contacts Zoro, asking him to kill him if he ever loses his emotions. Zoro agrees. Regaining composure, Sanji turns invisible and strikes Queen with Hell Memories.
1058	167	"The Onslaught of Kazenbo - Orochi's Evil Clutches Close in" Transliteration: "Kazenbō Shūrai - Semaru Orochi no Ma no Te" (Japanese: 火前坊襲来 迫るオロチの魔の手)	Shō Inuzuka	Atsuhiro Tomioka	Shūichi Itō	April 16, 2023
Big Mom, enraged by her injuries, vows to make Law and Kid suffer, unleashing her Homies on them. The two barely fend off the assault while, elsewhere, Izo has Marco carry him into the inner castle. Meanwhile, the fiery specter Kazenbo continues its destructive rampage through Onigashima, setting everything ablaze as both samurai and Beast Pirates flee in panic. Brook and Robin are still being pursued by CP0, leaping down to a lower floor to escape. Yamato races toward the armory, accompanied by Apoo and Fuga, with Drake chasing after Apoo. When Brook and Robin land in Fuga's hair, the CP0 agents try to follow but are engulfed by the falling Kazenbo. Wasting no time, Yamato presses onward to stop the catastrophe. In the Treasure Repository, Orochi listens gleefully to the chaos Kazenbo causes in the Kurozumi Clan's name—until he hears a shamisen melody nearby. Entranced, he crawls toward the sound and discovers Komurasaki, alive and smiling, playing before him. Outside, Momonosuke frantically generates Flame Clouds to stop Onigashima from crashing into the Flower Capital. Meanwhile, Zoro battles King, struggling to understand his opponent's invincible body. King reveals his power isn't from his Devil Fruit alone—but something "unique." As Enma drains Zoro's Haki, Orochi weeps before Komurasaki's serene smile.
1059	168	"Zoro Faces Adversity - A Monster! King the Wildfire"; Transliteration: "Gyakkyō no Zoro - Kaibutsu! Kasai no Kingu" (Japanese: 逆境のゾロ 怪物！火災のキング)	Yusuke Suzuki	Akiko Inoue	Masayuki Takagi	April 23, 2023
As Kazenbo, the fiery specter, descends toward the Armory, samurai and Beast Pirates fail to stop it. Realizing its intangibility and speed, Yamato accelerates ahead, riding Fuga with Brook and Robin. They dismount to evade the CP0 agents following close behind. The agents' pursuit halts when Apoo snaps their photos, intending to sell them to Morgans. After one agent strikes Apoo and Drake, Drake proposes an alliance, which Apoo readily accepts to take down the CP0. Outside, Momonosuke struggles to prevent Onigashima from crashing into the Flower Capital, determined to uphold his friends' faith in him. Within the Skull Dome, Hiyori, disguised as Komurasaki, plays her shamisen for a tearful Orochi. The song triggers Enma to drain Zoro's Haki, prompting King to taunt him for his "rebellious" sword. Their battle intensifies—King allowing Zoro's blade to pierce him, only to erupt in flames unscathed. Elsewhere, Sanji continues clashing with Queen, who mocks him for destroying his Raid Suit and for relying on Zoro. Queen boasts about King's Lunarian heritage, calling them "gods" who once ruled all environments. Sanji scoffs, asking how gods could go extinct. Meanwhile, Zoro's attacks fail to harm King, and another Haki surge from Enma weakens him. Struggling, Zoro recalls Kuina, Hitetsu, and learning that both Wado Ichimonji and Enma were forged by Shimotsuki Kozaburou.
1060	169	"The Secret of Enma! The Cursed Sword Entrusted to Zoro"; Transliteration: "Enma no Himitsu! Zoro ni Takusareshi Yōtō" (Japanese: 閻魔の秘密！ゾロに託されし妖刀)	Directed by : Tasuku Shimaya; Storyboarded by : Tatsuya Nagamine & Wataru Matsumi	Shinzō Fujita	Midori Matsuda & Masahiro Shimanuki	April 30, 2023
Zoro struggles to withstand Enma, which relentlessly drains his Haki as he battles King. Thrown back inside, he recalls learning the forbidden battle cry "Sunacchi," and how Hitetsu once revealed that both Wado Ichimonji and Enma were forged by the master swordsmith Shimotsuki Kozaburou. Zoro remembers meeting an old man in his village 13 years earlier—rumored to be a samurai—who taught him that swords have personalities and that "cursed" blades are simply powerful ones feared by the weak. The man had also spoken of his masterpiece: "The Great King of Hell." Realizing this referred to Enma, Zoro begins piecing the truth together. He recalls learning after the old man's death that he was Kuina's grandfather, and that his village, Shimotsuki Village, was founded by pirates from Wano. Understanding that Kozaburou and the old man were one and the same, Zoro grasps that Enma chose him as its wielder. Embracing this, he stops resisting the blade and allows it to draw his Haki freely. Unleashing Conqueror's Haki, Zoro knocks out nearby Beast Pirates, declaring he finally understands his sword's will. When King asks if he's trying to be a conqueror, Zoro remembers his promise to Kuina and Luffy—to become the world's greatest swordsman.
1061	170	"The Strike of an Ifrit! Sanji vs. Queen"; Transliteration: "Majin no Ichigeki! Sanji tai Kuīn" (Japanese: 魔神の一撃！サンジVSクイーン)	Ryōta Nakamura	Hitoshi Tanaka	Shigefumi Shingaki & Yong-Ce Tu	May 7, 2023
Sanji's battle against Queen intensifies after he destroys his Raid Suit, rejecting his Germa 66 lineage. Enraged, Queen reveals his own scientific augmentations—demonstrating powers mimicking Sanji's brothers—as part of his lifelong rivalry with Judge and determination to surpass Germa. Using these abilities, Queen overwhelms Sanji and nearly smashes him into the ground, but Sanji retaliates with a Diable Jambe kick that shatters Queen's mechanical arm. Meanwhile, Some, the geisha Sanji accidentally struck earlier, is recovering from her injuries when the hiding room collapses. As she searches for her missing pet mouse Chuji, she unknowingly wanders into the battlefield. Queen, invisible using Sanji's Stealth Black ability, prepares to attack her again—revealing he was the one who struck her before. Furious, Sanji's movements become so fast he seems invisible himself, though it strains his body. Combining his exoskeleton, Armament Haki, and fiery determination, Sanji ignites a new technique: Ifrit Jambe—blue, hotter flames that amplify his speed and power. Launching a blazing assault, he devastates Queen with relentless kicks before finishing him with Boeuf Burst, sending the All-Star hurtling off Onigashima into the mainland. Victorious yet exhausted, Sanji gently returns Chuji to Some before collapsing.
1062	171	"The Three-Sword Style of the Conqueror! Zoro vs. King"; Transliteration: "Haō no Santōryū! Zoro tai Kingu" (Japanese: 覇王の三刀流！ゾロVSキング)	Directed by : Ryōsuke Tanaka; Storyboarded by : Ryōsuke Tanaka & Katsumi Ishizuka	Tomohiro Nakayama	Keita Saitō, Midori Matsuda & Katsumi Ishizuka	May 21, 2023
With his swords now infused with both Armament and Conqueror's Haki, Zoro unveils his new King of Hell Three Sword Style, emitting black lightning and a green, smoke-like aura. As he clashes with King, Zoro finally draws his opponent's blood and tears off his mask, revealing a man with black wings, white hair, and brown skin. Beast Pirates nearby recognize him as part of a mysterious race worth a 100,000,000 Berry bounty for information—before King burns them alive for their words. Zoro soon deduces the secret of King's power: when the flames on his back are lit, his defense is immense; when extinguished, his speed skyrockets but his durability drops. The two warriors continue their fierce aerial battle outside Onigashima, with King acknowledging Zoro's strength for the first time. Zoro vows to end Kaido's tyranny, but King fiercely declares his captain will become the King of the Pirates. King remembers his past—once known as Alber, he was freed by Kaido from government experimentation on Punk Hazard. Kaido named him "King" and made him his right-hand man. In the present, Zoro cuts through King's fiery dragon attacks, ending the duel with 103 Mercies Dragon Damnation. As King falls defeated, both men reaffirm their captains' destinies.
1063	172	"Luffy is on the Move! A Turning Point to a New Era!"; Transliteration: "Rufi Yakudō! Shin Jidai no Bunkiten!" (Japanese: ルフィ躍動！新時代の分岐点！)	Masahiro Hosoda	Shōji Yonemura	Toshio Deguchi	May 28, 2023
After defeating King, Zoro collapses from exhaustion. A Mary reports King's defeat to a CP0 agent, who realizes the dire situation—the Beast Pirates' Lead Performers and Tobi Roppo have all fallen, leaving only Kaido and Big Mom standing between the Straw Hats and total victory. On the rooftop, Luffy and Kaido's intense battle nears its climax. Meanwhile, Momonosuke, having finally mastered control over Kaido's Flame Clouds, desperately pulls Onigashima away from the Flower Capital to prevent disaster. Deep below, the fiery apparition Kazenbo continues its march toward the basement armory to ignite the island's bombs. Yamato, racing to stop it, reaches the armory doors with help from Fuga, who holds off Rokki so she can rush inside. Elsewhere, Usopp finds the injured Kin'emon and Kiku, refusing to abandon them despite their pleas to prioritize honor over survival. Izo appears just in time to fight off their pursuers, allowing Usopp and the samurai to escape atop Hamlet's back. On the third floor, Raizo and Fukurokuju remain locked in a fiery stalemate, both paralyzed by their own jutsu. Komurasaki continues playing her shamisen before Orochi, lulling him into false comfort. Meanwhile, Drake and Apoo fall to CP0, who are ordered to withdraw as Luffy and Kaido clash joyfully above.
1064	173	"Drunken Dragon Bagua! The Lawless Dragon Closing in on Luffy"; Transliteration: "Shuron Hakke! Rufi ni Semaru Muhō no Ryū" (Japanese: 酒龍八卦！ルフィに迫る無法の龍)	Katsumi Tokoro	Ryo Yamazaki	Kazuya Hisada	June 4, 2023
As Luffy and Kaido's climactic battle rages atop the Skull Dome, Momonosuke desperately struggles to steer Onigashima away from the Flower Capital, where the unaware citizens celebrate the Fire Festival. Below, the people drink, sing, and release floating lanterns carrying heartfelt wishes. Toko's lantern expresses her desire to see her father again, breaking Hitetsu's heart as he watches her innocence amid the looming catastrophe. On the rooftop, Kaido begins drinking mid-fight, frustrating Luffy. In his drunken state, Kaido unveils his Drunken Dragon Bagua fighting style, switching erratically between his hybrid and dragon forms. His erratic movements and intensified Haki make his attacks more unpredictable, but Luffy endures and counters, landing a devastating kick that makes Kaido cough blood. Meanwhile, in Mary Geoise, the Five Elders discuss the chaos following this year's Levely — the fall of the Seven Warlords, the Arabasta incident, and the Revolutionaries' infiltration. Despite these crises, they turn their attention to Wano, hoping the CP0 has captured Nico Robin and plotting to exploit Big Mom and Kaido's downfall to erase "inconvenient" figures. They mention a mysterious Devil Fruit so secret the World Government renamed it to hide its true identity. Outside Wano's seas, Marine fleets stand by nervously as Zunesha, the colossal elephant, approaches.
1065	174	"The Destruction of the Alliance?! Fire up, the Will of the New Generation!"; Transliteration: "Dōmei Kaimetsu!? Moero Shin Sedai no Ishi!" (Japanese: 同盟壊滅!? 燃えろ新世代の意志！)	Hazuki Omoya	Atsuhiro Tomioka	Shigefumi Shingaki & Kimitaka Itō	June 11, 2023
On the third floor, Raizo and Fukurokuju remain locked in their Paralysis Jutsu, both engulfed in flames yet refusing to yield. On the second floor, Jinbe rescues trapped samurai from collapsing debris, guiding them toward safety. Meanwhile, on the Performance Floor, Chopper reverts to normal and regains mobility but worries deeply for Zoro, knowing his pain will double once the medicine's effects fade. Outside, a bleeding Zoro hallucinates the Grim Reaper, while Franky frantically searches for him in the Right-Brain Tower. Elsewhere, a gravely wounded Izo defeats the last of the Beasts Pirates but is stabbed before gunning down his attacker. Barely standing, he encounters the CP0 agents pursuing Robin. Though they plan to ignore him, Izo defiantly orders them to stop. In the armory, Yamato reaches the bombs just as Kazenbo arrives to ignite them. She briefly transforms, freezing the explosives and striking the fiery specter, but it engulfs her in flames as she screams in pain. Back on the Performance Floor, Big Mom devastates Law and Kid with lightning, questioning Kaido's delay in victory. Attempting to fly to the rooftop, she's halted by Law's K-ROOM: Shock Wille, and Kid's Punk Corna Dio slams her into a building. Together, they vow to stop her from reaching Kaido, even if it costs their lives.
1066	175	"Here Comes Main Act! Powerful Techniques of Shockwave and Magnetism"; Transliteration: "Ōtori Kitaru! Hadō to Jiki no Ōwaza" (Japanese: 大トリ来る！波動と磁気の大技)	Henry Thurlow	Akiko Inoue	Masahiro Kitazaki	June 25, 2023
As Momonosuke struggles to steer Onigashima away from the Flower Capital, he's momentarily distracted by a mysterious voice calling out to him. Meanwhile, on the Performance Floor, Big Mom is struck down by Kid's Corna Dio, shattering her right arm and breaking her ribs from Law's shockwaves. Using her Soul-Soul Fruit, she animates her own bones to heal herself. Radiating Conqueror's Haki, Big Mom prepares for another clash. Law warns he's nearly drained, but Kid refuses to coordinate, demanding he fight his own way. Big Mom fuses Napoleon, Prometheus, and Hera into the sword Maser Saber, slicing Kid's metal bull apart. Kid retaliates by magnetizing her with Assign, flinging her into a nearby tower. She rips the wall down as a shield, but Kid strikes her legs, forcing her to her knees. The two bombard her relentlessly until she counters with Mother's Visit Cannon: 3,000 Leagues of Misery, summoning her fiery homie, Misery, who devastates the battlefield. Law retaliates with Takt, crushing her under a tower, then uses K-ROOM: Puncture Wille, impaling her through the island and unleashing a massive shockwave through Wano. As Big Mom reels, Law urges Kid to finish it. Kid charges a colossal Damned Punk, blasting Big Mom point-blank as Law declares that "Your era is over."
1067	176	"To the New Era! Settled! The Determination of the Brats"; Transliteration: "Shin Jidai e! Ketchaku! Gaki-domo no Kakugo" (Japanese: 新時代へ！決着！ガキ共の覚悟)	Kenichi Takeshita	Shinzō Fujita	Kenji Yokoyama	July 2, 2023
Raizo and Fukurokuju's standoff reaches its climax as both are engulfed in flames. Unable to withstand the heat, Fukurokuju collapses, screaming for water while Raizo endures in silence. Meanwhile, Big Mom is cornered by Kid and Law, who launch a final assault to knock her into the crater below. In desperation, Big Mom uses Soul Pocus to steal their lifespans, but her power fails since neither captain fears her. Law then activates R-ROOM, a new variation of his ability that binds to her wherever she goes. Channeling his late benefactor Corazon, he uses Silent, muting her completely. Big Mom's homie Misery attempts to intervene, but Law slices her apart as Kid fires a second, stronger Damned Punk, finally blasting Big Mom through the island. She crashes into the armory, where she unknowingly detonates one of the frozen bombs. The resulting explosion rips another hole through Onigashima, sending her plummeting toward Wano's mainland. Yamato quickly blocks further explosions with ice, though the blast heavily damages Kazenbo, which retreats toward Orochi. The explosion destabilizes the island, causing Zoro, severely injured, to fall from its edge. As Big Mom descends into a magma chamber, she reflects on her life—from her youth with Carmel to her failures against Luffy and curses Roger for igniting the Great Pirate Era. Her fall triggers a volcanic eruption, marking the downfall of a Yonko.
1068	177	"Moon Princess Echoes! The Final Phase of the Land of Wano!"; Transliteration: "Tsukihime ga Hibiku! Wano Kuni Saishū Kyokumen!" (Japanese: 月姫が響く！ワノ国最終局面！)	Directed by : Shō Matsui; Storyboarded by : Yutaka Nakashima & Shō Matsui	Hitoshi Tanaka	Masahiro Shimanuki & Toshio Deguchi	July 9, 2023
Zunesha arrives near Onigashima to aid the alliance, but Momonosuke hesitates, fearing that liberation might cost innocent lives. As explosions rock the island, Onigashima begins to crumble. Franky saves Zoro from falling into the sea, pulling him back with his mechanical arm. Meanwhile, Izo intercepts the CP0 agents, refusing to let them advance. Though quickly overpowered, Izo fatally shoots Maha, killing each other in the process. The lead CP0 agent mourns his comrade briefly before resuming his mission to capture Nico Robin, only to receive an urgent order from the Five Elders: eliminate Luffy immediately. In the Performance Hall, Kid and Law recover from their brutal fight with Big Mom, celebrating her defeat but too exhausted to face Kaido again. Meanwhile, in Orochi's private chamber, Komurasaki reveals her true identity as Hiyori. As the ceiling collapses, she pins Orochi under rubble and inserts a Seastone nail to suppress his powers. Playing "Moon Princess," she reveals it was her father Oden's favorite song and that she wore a mask to hide her sadness while performing for Orochi. On the rooftop, Kaido mourns Big Mom's downfall, reminiscing about their days under Rocks D. Xebec. Luffy, seizing the moment, activates Fourth Gear: Snakeman and unleashes his Gum-Gum Hydra, vowing not to stop until Kaido is defeated.
1069	178	"There is Only One Winner - Luffy vs. Kaido"; Transliteration: "Shōsha wa Hitori - Rufi tai Kaidō" (Japanese: 勝者はひとり ルフィVSカイドウ)	Directed by : Shō Inuzuka; Storyboarded by : Toshinori Fukuzawa & Shō Inuzuka	Tomohiro Nakayama	Masayuki Takagi	July 16, 2023
In the burning hallway, Fukurokuju collapses, consumed by flames as Raizo offers his final words before succumbing to exhaustion. Jinbe arrives, extinguishing the fire with Fish-Man Karate and rescues Raizo, who entrusts him with a final favor. Elsewhere, Drake ambushes the lead CP0 agent, stabbing him before being fatally struck by a Finger Pistol. The agent continues toward the rooftop to fulfill his mission. In the Flower Capital, citizens prepare to release their lanterns, unaware of the ongoing chaos. On the Skull Dome rooftop, Luffy batters Kaido with unpredictable, direction-bending punches, baffling the Emperor. Using Advanced Observation Haki, Kaido transforms into his dragon form, dodges Luffy's attacks, and retaliates—swallowing and blasting him through Onigashima. Luffy escapes in Boundman form, though his time in Fourth Gear nears its end. Luffy ascends again, declaring Wano will starve under Kaido's rule. He readies a "Gum-Gum Over Kong Gun" infused with Conqueror's Haki, while Kaido mocks Wano's people as "losers." Luffy counters that the samurai are strong, clashing head-on with Kaido's "Thunder Bellow Bagua." However, the CP0 agent intervenes, grabbing Luffy's arm mid-attack. Unable to stop himself, Kaido lands a devastating blow, flashing back to Oden's betrayal, as horror fills his eyes.
1070	179	"Luffy is Defeated?! The Determination of Those Left Behind"; Transliteration: "Rufi Haiboku!? Nokosareta Mono no Kakugo" (Japanese: ルフィ敗北!? 残された者の覚悟)	Yusuke Suzuki	Ryo Yamazaki	Shūichi Itō	July 30, 2023
After taking a devastating blow from Kaido's kanabō, Luffy collapses with his Fourth Gear deflating and dies. Furious that his victory was tainted by interference, Kaido kills the CP0 agent responsible before returning to the Performance Floor. Transforming into his dragon form, he declares Luffy dead and demands the alliance's unconditional surrender. Though Chopper and Tama cry in despair, Nami refuses to believe Kaido's claim, openly defying him. Kaido fires a Blast Breath, but Marco intercepts the attack, urging everyone to fight on. Kaido vows to complete his New Onigashima Project, moving the island to the Flower Capital and enslaving Wano's citizens. His words crush the samurai's morale as he calls for Momonosuke to appear. The Beasts Pirates attempt to eliminate Kid and Law, but their crews intervene, and the captains force themselves to stand again. Elsewhere, Carrot and Cat Viper rejoin the battle. Momonosuke nearly surrenders, but Yamato reminds him that giving in would doom everyone to slavery and that this fight carries twenty years of Wano's suffering. Resolute, Momonosuke continues to resist. On the rooftop, Luffy's heartbeat suddenly returns, echoing like drums. Hearing it, Zunesha tells Momonosuke that he hears the "Drums of Liberation"—a sound unheard for 800 years—and declares that Joy Boy has returned as Luffy's body begins to transform that revives him.
1071	180	"Luffy's Peak - Attained! Fifth Gear"; Transliteration: "Rufi no Saikō Chiten - Tōtatsu!〝Gia Fifusu〟" (Japanese: ルフィの最高地点 到達！〝ギア5〟)	Tatsuya Nagamine	Atsuhiro Tomioka	Midori Matsuda & Keita Saitō	August 6, 2023
Zunesha informs Momonosuke and Yamato that Joy Boy has returned. Atop the Skull Dome, Luffy revives and completes his transformation, awakening the true power of his Devil Fruit. His hair and clothes (except his straw hat, sash, and sandals) turn white, his eyebrows curl, and pink irises glow as clouds float around his shoulders. The ground beneath him turns rubbery as he radiates boundless joy. Nami and Tama celebrate tearfully upon realizing he's alive. Meanwhile in Mary Geoise, the Five Elders lament sacrificing a top agent to stop Luffy. They reveal that for 800 years, the World Government failed to capture the Gum-Gum Fruit, which seemed to evade them intentionally. One Elder explains that Zoan Fruits possess wills of their own—revealing the Gum-Gum Fruit's true identity as the Mythical Zoan Human-Human Fruit, Model: Nika. Upon awakening, the user becomes the legendary Sun God Nika, whose power and freedom are limited only by imagination—the most ridiculous powerful ability in the world. In the Treasure Repository, Orochi begs Hiyori to free him, but she refuses. The vengeful wisp Kazenbo burns Orochi instead. On the rooftop, Luffy joyfully announces his peak form: Fifth Gear. Radiating immense Conqueror's Haki, he grabs Kaido's dragon body and hammers him. When Kaido apologizes for CP0's interference, Luffy accepts and prepares for their final decisive showdown.
1072	181	"The Ridiculous Power! Fifth Gear in Full Play"; Transliteration: "Fuzaketa Nōryoku! Yakudō Suru Gia Fifusu" (Japanese: ふざけた能力！躍動するギア5)	Directed by : Tasuku Shimaya; Storyboarded by : Tasuku Shimaya, Megumi Ishitani, Bahi JD, Yong-Ce Tu & Takeshi Maenami	Akiko Inoue	Nobuyuki Iwai, Keisuke Mori, Kimitaka Itō & Shigefumi Shingaki	August 13, 2023
As Luffy and Kaido resume their climactic battle, Kaido admits he was certain Luffy had died, to which Luffy casually agrees. Observing Luffy's new abilities, Kaido deduces that he has awakened his Paramecia power, allowing him to turn his surroundings into rubber, though its Zoan-like properties confuse him. In his dragon form, Kaido tries to swallow Luffy whole, but Luffy retaliates from within—inflating himself inside Kaido's body and bursting out through his eyes. Growing to giant size, Luffy then gleefully uses Kaido as a jump rope. When Kaido counters with a Blast Breath, Luffy is unharmed and astonishingly runs on air back to Onigashima using cartoonish physics. Meanwhile, Yamato and Momonosuke ascend to the rooftop to witness Luffy's bizarre awakened form firsthand. Kaido transforms into his Human-Beast form, smashing Luffy's head into the Skull Dome's rooftop, shocking the allied forces below. Nami, Tama, Chopper, Law, Kid and Marco all watch in disbelief. Both warriors briefly collapse from exhaustion, but Kaido insists death would immortalize their tale. Luffy rejects the notion, declaring he won't die while people rely on him. Remembering Momonosuke, Tama, Kin'emon, and Pedro, he reactivates Fifth Gear. When Kaido demands his identity, Luffy proudly declares himself the man who will surpass him and become King of the Pirates.
1073	182	"No Way Out! A Hellish Scene on Onigashima"; Transliteration: "Nigeba Nashi! Jigoku Ezu no Onigashima" (Japanese: 逃げ場なし！地獄絵図の鬼ヶ島)	Katsumi Tokoro	Shinzō Fujita	Mamoru Yokota	August 20, 2023
Kaido explains to Luffy that a Devil Fruit Awakening occurs when the user's mind and body finally synchronize with their powers. Reflecting on the raid's toll, Kaido laments the destruction of his castle and the loss of all his top officers. Despite his exhaustion, he continues battling Luffy atop the Skull Dome, where Luffy suddenly launches into the air with a new idea. Inside the Skull Dome, chaos reigns as fires spread uncontrollably. The allied forces are scattered—Chopper, Nami, and Tama reunite but struggle against the flames; Brook, Robin, Apoo, and Inbi are trapped in the basement; Sanji and several women are cornered in the left brain tower; Usopp, Franky, and Zoro are stuck in collapsing corridors, while the Minks are trapped on the third floor. On the fourth floor, Raizo and Jinbe initiate a plan to extinguish the fires. Having prepared since Oden Castle's burning, Raizo uses his scrolls to release immense water stored from Zou's Rain-Ruption. With his Fish-Man Jujutsu, Jinbe manipulates the torrent, flooding the Dome and saving everyone. Outside, Yamato urges Momonosuke to create Flame Clouds, as Kaido's weakening power causes the originals to fade. Just as Onigashima teeters on collapse, Luffy reappears before Kaido—grasping a lightning bolt in his hand.
1074	183	"I Trust Momo - Luffy's Final Powerful Technique!"; Transliteration: "Momo o Shinjiru - Rufi Saigo no Ōwaza!" (Japanese: モモを信じる ルフィ最後の大技！)	Directed by : Nanami Michibata; Storyboarded by : Masahiro Hosoda & Hone Hone	Hitoshi Tanaka	Kazuya Hisada, Hone Hone & Shū Sugita	September 3, 2023
Momonosuke struggles to produce Flame Clouds to keep Onigashima aloft, his confidence faltering as the island begins to plummet. Remembering his final moments with his mother, he finds renewed resolve—but an explosion accelerates the island's descent. On the Skull Dome's rooftop, Luffy continues his desperate clash with Kaido, manipulating clouds and lightning to strike him from every angle. Kaido, however, retaliates with overwhelming strength, asserting that Haki surpasses all Devil Fruits, citing Roger and Oden as proof. He devastates Luffy with Destroyer of Death: Thunder Bagua, launching him high into the sky. Below, the Fire Festival nears its end as Luffy grabs hold of Kaido's dragon form. Kaido counters with fierce wind blades and searing flames. Inside the Skull Dome, Orochi, freed when his Seastone nail dislodges, transforms into his one-headed Yamata no Orochi form, vowing to drag Hiyori into death with him. Meanwhile, the allied forces realize that if Luffy triumphs, Onigashima will still fall and crush them. Accepting their final fate, they cheer him on determined to see Kaido defeated once and for all. Hearing the voices and hopes of Wano's citizens, Luffy inflates his fist to the size of the island itself. With unshakable faith in Momonosuke, he entrusts him to move Onigashima as he readies his final world-shaking strike.
1075	184	"20 Years Worth of Prayers! Take Back the Land of Wano"; Transliteration: "Nijū-nen no Inori! Wano Kuni o Torimodose" (Japanese: 二十年の祈り！ワノ国を取り戻せ)	Yasunori Koyama	Tomohiro Nakayama	Yong-Ce Tu & Masahiro Kitazaki	September 10, 2023
As Momonosuke struggles to move Onigashima out of the path of Luffy's most powerful attack, he fears he will fail to act in time. Meanwhile, Kaido transforms himself with Flame Dragon Torch, turning into a colossal dragon of pure fire whose tail melts the Skull Dome's last remaining horn. Luffy decides to use Ryuo to strike without direct contact, channeling his will into a single blow. Kaido unleashes Rising Dragon: Flame Bagua while Luffy counters with Gum-Gum Bajrang Gun, their most powerful techniques colliding in a cataclysmic clash that illuminates all of Wano. Within the Skull Dome, memories of the nation's torment resurface: Orochi's cruel rule, forced labor, famine, and despair as citizens consumed defective SMILE Fruits or polluted water to survive. Elsewhere, in his monstrous Yamata no Orochi form, Orochi attempts to kill Hiyori, but Denjiro intervenes, severing his final head and ending his reign of terror. Comforting Hiyori, Denjiro assures her that their suffering has finally ended. Above, Wano's citizens send Sky Ships bearing wishes for freedom into the heavens. Remembering his family and his duty, Momonosuke finally summons his strength to move Onigashima aside. As prayers rise, Luffy and Kaido's final clash reaches its world-shaking conclusion.
1076	185	"The World That Luffy Wants!"; Transliteration: "Rufi no Mezasu Sekai!" (Japanese: ルフィの目指す世界！)	Satoshi Itō	Shōji Yonemura	Yong-Ce Tu & Ziwei He	September 17, 2023
As Luffy and Kaido clash in their final battle, Kaido's past is revealed. Raised in the impoverished Vodka Kingdom, a nation forced to raid others to pay tribute to the World Government, Kaido became a child soldier at ten and its strongest warrior. When the king sold him to the Marines to gain entry to the Levely, Kaido rebelled, attacking his captors and becoming wanted. He repeatedly allowed himself to be captured only to escape after raiding Marine supplies. At fifteen, Whitebeard recruited him into the Rocks Pirates, whose reign of terror ended at God Valley, where Garp and others destroyed the crew. A decade later, Kaido founded the Beast Pirates and allied with the Kurozumi Family to seize Wano, envisioning a world where only strength mattered. He once told King that if "Joy Boy" ever appeared, he would be the man to defeat him. In the present, Raizo's flood forces the alliance in the Skull Dome to cooperate for survival, while Denjiro praises Hiyori's endurance in avenging her family. Momonosuke creates his own Flame Clouds, steering Onigashima from the Flower Capital. In their last clash, Luffy declares he'll build a world of freedom and laughter, unleashing a massive punch that sends Kaido crashing underground—fulfilling King's prophecy.
1077	186	"The Curtain Falls! The Winner, Straw Hat Luffy!"; Transliteration: "Makuhiki! Shōsha - Mugiwara no Rufi!" (Japanese: 幕引き！勝者 麦わらのルフィ！)	Hazuki Omoya	Ryo Yamazaki	Toshio Deguchi & Masahiro Shimanuki	September 24, 2023
After Luffy collapses from exhaustion and Yamato catches him, Onigashima lands safely near the Flower Capital, marking the end of the Raid and Kaido's defeat for good. Cat Viper declares Oden avenged and the prophecy fulfilled. Inside the Skull Dome, the alliance celebrates as Chopper and Miyagi treat the wounded while Yamato forces the remaining Beast Pirates to surrender. Meanwhile, Momonosuke informs Zunesha that he will not open Wano's borders yet, choosing instead to protect the country himself. In the Flower Capital, moments before the lanterns are released, Tenguyama tells Toko that Yasuie knowingly sacrificed himself so the alliance could fight for Wano's future and give her a better life. Toko remembers her tragic past—how she ate a SMILE fruit while starving and how Yasuie ate one too, so she would not suffer alone. To honor his sacrifice, Toko edits her lantern to thank her father. Refusing defeat, the Beast Pirates try to resume fighting, but Yamato warns them that Momonosuke saved the capital by moving Onigashima and threatens to stop them herself. Underground, unconscious Kaido falls into a magma chamber with Big Mom, causing a volcanic eruption. Momonosuke returns, announces victory, and introduces Wano's new shogun as Denjiro and Hiyori emerge from the smoke.
1078	187	"He Returns! The Shogun of the Land of Wano, Kozuki Momonosuke"; Transliteration: "Kikan! Wano Kuni Shōgun - Kōzuki Momonosuke" (Japanese: 帰還！ワノ国将軍 光月モモの助)	Toshinori Fukuzawa	Atsuhiro Tomioka	Kenji Yokoyama	October 1, 2023
In the Flower Capital, Kyoshiro reveals himself to be Denjiro and publicly announces the return of the Akazaya Nine, with news spreading rapidly across Wano. Inside the Skull Dome, Chopper tends to the injured while Yamato introduces herself to the Straw Hat Pirates as Kaido's son, asking to join their crew. Though the crew is generally supportive, they decide to wait for Luffy's approval. When several Beast Pirates attempt to flee, Yamato and a pair of Gifters stop them. Usopp wonders what will happen to the tamed Gifters, prompting Tama to explain her powers only last a month, though some animals remain loyal. Speed confirms this and expresses her wish to stay with Tama—not as a servant, but as her adoptive mother, which Tama happily accepts. In his human form, Momonosuke announces Wano's victory and the downfall of Kaido and Orochi, vowing to abolish slavery and end the suffering caused by their rule. As he speaks, Tama recalls her tragic childhood—losing her parents, struggling to survive, and being taken in by Tenguyama, who shared the prophecy of the Kouzuki Family's return. The citizens rejoice as Momonosuke pledges to honor his father's legacy and restore Wano's prosperity.
1079	188	"The Morning Comes! Luffy and the Others Rest!"; Transliteration: "Asa ga Kita! Rufi-tachi no Kyūsoku!" (Japanese: 朝が来た！ルフィ達の休息！)	Yusuke Suzuki	Akiko Inoue	Masayuki Takagi	October 15, 2023
In Mary Geoise, the Five Elders learn of Kaido and Big Mom's defeat and Wano's liberation, recognizing the reemergence of Nika within Luffy. They note Zunesha's departure and lament that Wano's closed borders prevent invasion. The Five Elders order the remaining CP0 agent to capture Robin, but their Transponder Snail call is mysteriously hijacked. Meanwhile, a wounded Drake speaks with Hawkins, who confesses he foresaw Kaido's downfall but was too prideful to return to Kid's side. Hawkins reveals the man with only a one percent chance of survival was himself before collapsing. A week later, Wano's citizens continue celebrating their freedom. Schools teach a revised history glorifying Oden and people speak in awe of the legendary "Joy Boy", comparing him to the legendary Ryuma. The Akazaya Nine plan to build a temple for Oden and bury Yasuie, Ashura, and Izou in Ringo. After seven days of rest, Luffy and Zoro awaken, reuniting with Momonosuke—now in his adult form—before joining their allies in the bathhouse for celebration. At Tokage Port, Franky finishes repairs on the Thousand Sunny, while Apoo informs Kid and Law of their new bounties and the rise of four new Emperors. Offshore, Admiral Ryokugyu nears Wano, despite Sakazuki's warnings to avoid conflict.
1080	189	"A Celebration Banquet! The New Emperors of the Sea!"; Transliteration: "Shukusai no Utage! Atarashiki Umi no Kōtei-tachi!" (Japanese: 祝祭の宴！新しき海の皇帝達！)	Ryota Nakamura	Shinzō Fujita	Shuichi Ito & Toshio Deguchi	October 22, 2023
Across the world, news spreads of Kaido and Big Mom's downfall. The Five Elders try to suppress Luffy's new bounty poster—showing his Nika form and removing the "D." from his name—but the printing presses ignore them, releasing the uncensored image. Luffy, Law, and Kid each receive a 3-billion-berry bounty, stunning the world. In Wano, the Straw Hat Pirates join the extended Fire Festival, celebrating the country's liberation. Robin discovers Wano's Poneglyph, where she meets Tenguyama Hitetsu, who reveals his true identity as Kouzuki Sukiyaki, Oden's father and Momonosuke and Hiyori's grandfather. Sukiyaki explains his years in hiding after escaping the Kurozumi family's imprisonment and confirms that Pluton, one of the Ancient Weapons, lies hidden within Wano. At the Udon Prison Mine, the battered King and Queen are attacked by Admiral Ryokugyu, whose Woods-Woods Fruit powers drain their life force. He defeats them easily, ordering their arrest before advancing toward the Flower Capital to target Luffy. Back at the festival, Momonosuke recalls Luffy's advice to conceal the raid's details. Suddenly, Kid confronts Luffy, angrily revealing that the new Four Emperors are Blackbeard, Shanks, Buggy, and Luffy himself. Though furious, Kid joins the revelry as Ryokugyu closes in on the celebrating heroes.
1081	190	"The World Will Burn! The Onslaught of a Navy Admiral!"; Transliteration: "Sekai ga Moeru! Kaigun Taishō Shūrai!" (Japanese: 世界が燃える！海軍大将襲来！)	Sho Matsui	Hitoshi Tanaka	Shigefumi Shingaki	October 29, 2023
The Red Hair Pirates near the borders of Wano, where Shanks and his crew debate to finally seeing Luffy again for years. Though everyone but Yasopp wishes to reunite with his son Usopp, Shanks recalls stealing the Gum-Gum Fruit from CP9 and how Luffy accidentally ate it. Choosing not to meet him, Shanks instead resolves to confront Bartolomeo for disrespecting his flag—and declares it's time to go after the One Piece. Meanwhile, Admiral Ryokugyu infiltrates Wano, confronting the Akazaya Nine and Shinobu near the Flower Capital. Proclaiming the Celestial Dragons as gods, he transforms into a massive wooden golem using his Woods-Woods Fruit powers, effortlessly deflecting their attacks. Believing Wano's independence from the World Government makes its citizens expendable, he begins his assault until Yamato arrives to help. At Marine Headquarters, Fleet Admiral Sakazuki meets with Kizaru and Kurouma to discuss the Revolutionary Army's assault on Mariejois—where Sabo allegedly assassinated Nefertari Cobra, Vivi's vanished and Kuma's freed. The World Nobles are also deliberating Saint Mjosgard's punishment for aiding an unknown attacker against Saint Charlos. Sabo's deeds make him a worldwide hero dubbed the "Flame Emperor." Kizaru notes that Luffy's rise as an Emperor only amplifies Sabo's influence. Back in Wano, Momonosuke, struggling to use flame breath, confronts Ryokugyu but is captured. Despite his injuries, he insists Yamato stay back, determined to defend Wano without outside help.
1082	191	"The Coming of the New Era! The Red-Haired's Imperial Rage"; Transliteration: "Shin Jidai Tōrai! Akagami no Kōtei no Ikari" (Japanese: 新時代到来！赤髪の皇帝の怒り)	Sho Inuzuka	Tomohiro Nakayama	Keita Saito & Kimitaka Ito	November 5, 2023
During the Flower Capital's festival, the Straw Hat Pirates and Heart Pirates enjoy the celebrations, unaware that the Akazaya Nine are locked in a fierce battle outside the city against Admiral Ryokugyu. Despite their efforts, his wood-based powers overwhelm them. Raizo tries to burn him, but Ryokugyu reveals his wood is flame-resistant, then pierces Raizo with vines, draining him of fluids. Momonosuke, refusing Yamato's help, insists on fighting alone to prove Wano can defend itself without relying on the Straw Hats. Meanwhile, Sukiyaki secretly guides Robin and Law through an ancient passage beneath Wano, revealing a sunken civilization that predates the current country. He explains it was submerged after boundary walls trapped the rain centuries ago. At the passage's end, they find a Road Poneglyph, while Sukiyaki discloses that Pluton lies even deeper underground—its release possible only by opening Wano's borders. As Ryokugyu ensnares the samurai, Momonosuke recalls Luffy's courage and unleashes a Blast Breath, destroying Ryokugyu's wooden form. Before the Admiral can strike back, Shanks projects an immense wave of Conqueror's Haki from offshore, paralyzing him. Mocking Ryokugyu's fear of the new generation, Shanks' presence forces his retreat. Luffy and his crew, watching from afar, praise the samurai's resolve and note the overwhelming power of the unseen Shanks's Haki.
1083	192	"The World That Moves On! A New Organization, Cross Guild"; Transliteration: "Ugoku Sekai! Shin Soshiki Kurosu Girudo" (Japanese: 動く世界！新組織クロスギルド)	Katsumi Tokoro	Shōji Yonemura	Kazuya Hisada	November 12, 2023
In the aftermath of the battle for Wano, Kin'emon and Kikunojo visit the recovering Raizo and Shinobu, who are still weakened by Ryokugyu's dehydration attack. Kin'emon happily reports that he has reunited with Tsuru. Elsewhere, Carrot privately meets with the Minks, where Dogstorm and Cat Viper announce their decision to remain in Wano to defend the shogun. They appoint Carrot as ruler of Mokomo Dukedom, believing her travels with the Straw Hats have given her the experience and resolve once shown by Pedro. Meanwhile, Sukiyaki finally reveals his true identity to his grandson Momonosuke, his granddaughter Hiyori and the Akazaya Nine, apologizing for hiding after his son Oden's death. Robin reports that the ancient weapon Pluton lies within Wano, but Luffy refuses to seek it due he is not interested to the Ancient Weapons. Shinobu, now rejuvenated after her ordeal, appears with Tama, who becomes her kunoichi apprentice. Tama asks to join Luffy's crew once she masters ninjutsu. Caribou, eavesdropping, plans to inform an unknown ally about Pluton. Days later, Momonosuke and Kin'emon discover too late that the Straw Hats have already departed without saiying goodbye. At Tokage Port, the Straw Hat, Heart, and Kid Pirates prepare to set sail. Kid reveals news of the Cross Guild, an alliance between Buggy, Mihawk, and Crocodile, and mentions a mysterious "Man with a Burn Mark" linked to the next race for the One Piece,.
1084	193	"Time to Depart - The Land of Wano and the Straw Hats"; Transliteration: "Tabidachi no Toki - Wano kuni to Mugiwara no Ichimi" (Japanese: 旅立ちの時 ワノ国と麦わらの一味)	Kenichi Takeshita	Shōji Yonemura	Masahiro Kitazaki	November 19, 2023
Before their departure from the Land of Wano, Luffy and the Akazaya Nine (minus Kin'emon) and Shinobu visit the mountain where Kuri Castle once stood. Paying respects to Oden, they vow to return the Land of Wano to its state before it was taken over by the Kurozumi Family. They bid farewell to the Straw Hat Pirates as they prepare for their departure from the country, and Carrot also says her goodbye leaving towards Mokomo Dukedom. Meanwhile, Zoro visits Pedro and Yasuie's graves with alcohol, where he is joined by Toko and Hiyori. Zoro vows to increase his strength to fully master Enma as Oden has. At Tokage Port, Franky requests Minatomo's help in repairing the Thousand Sunny, but finds the ship to be in perfect condition. In the Flower Capital, Usopp purchases cloth and Sanji sells out his remaining Special Soba, being visited by Some and Chuji. As Okobore Town is being rebuilt, Luffy visits Tsurujo's tea house for oshiruko, bidding goodbye to Tama. At Tokage Port, the Straw Hat Pirates prepare to make their departure, Chopper gives Bepo a special drug. The Straw Hats have reservations about not bidding farewell to Momonosuke and Kin'emon but Luffy is confident they will appear.
1085	194	"The Last Curtain! Luffy and Momonosuke's Vow"; Transliteration: "Shūmaku! Rufi to Momonosuke no Chikai" (Japanese: 終幕！ルフィとモモの助の誓い)	Toshinori Fukuzawa	Ryo Yamazaki	Mamoru Yokota	November 26, 2023
With Orochi dethroned and Kaido defeated, Wano Country finally begins to flourish. The Raid on Onigashima becomes immortalized in a stage performance retelling the heroes' victory. Meanwhile, Momonosuke, Kin'emon, and Yamato hurry toward Tokage Port to bid farewell to the Straw Hat Pirates. Along the way, Yamato reveals her decision to remain in Wano, choosing to follow Kozuki Oden's example by exploring her homeland before venturing to sea. Feeling betrayed that Luffy would depart without saying goodbye, Momonosuke grows emotional—Kin'emon sharing his frustration. At the port, Luffy, Law, and Kid exchange competitive farewells before setting off. When Momonosuke finally arrives in tears, Luffy gifts him a Straw Hat Jolly Roger, declaring him his brother and promising to return if Momonosuke, Kin'emon, or Yamato ever choose the pirate life. The Straw Hats then depart through Hakumai's official port, a safer exit, but Kid mocks them for taking the "easy way." Provoked, Luffy and Law race him toward the waterfalls instead, sending all three crews tumbling down once more. Back in the Flower Capital, the tale's narration concludes with Hiyori's defiant words to Orochi—"Black charcoal would not be called Kurozumi if it wasn't burned!" As peace returns, Momonosuke wonders where to fly the Straw Hats' flag, symbolizing Wano's rebirth and the curtain's close on the legendary Land of Wano arc.
Prologue to Egghead
1086	195	"A New Emperor! Buggy the Genius Jester!"; Transliteration: "Shin Kōtei! Senryō Dōke no Bagī!" (Japanese: 新皇帝！千両道化のバギー！)	Directed by : Tasuku Shimaya; Storyboarded by : Nozomu Shishido	Atsuhiro Tomioka	Masahiro Shimanuki	December 3, 2023
As the Thousand Sunny departs Wano, chaos erupts when Luffy recklessly sails down the waterfall after him and Law are taunted by Kid, prompting a totally enraged Nami to beat him senseless and lock him in a cage as punishment. The crew soon discovers their updated bounties and official recognition as the senior captain and senior officers of the Straw Hat Grand Fleet. Reactions vary: Chopper fumes over his pitiful increase, and Franky rages that the Thousand Sunny—not his face—appears on his poster. Nami and Usopp are horrified by their skyrocketing bounties, Brook cheerfully embraces his fame and Robin remains indifferent. Sanji initially gloats about finally surpassing a billion berries, only to seethe with jealousy anger upon learning Jinbe and Zoro's bounties are higher—Zoro smugly rubbing it in as Jinbe proudly acknowledges his Straw Hats member title. A starving Luffy begs to be let out while promising he will not do anything reckless never again. Meanwhile, on Emptee Bluffs Island, Mihawk and Crocodile confront Buggy over being falsely depicted as their leader. Flashbacks reveal Crocodile rescued Buggy from the Marines to collect an unpaid debt and later teamed with Mihawk to form an organization. Unable to repay, Buggy offered his and his crew's labor. However, Buggy's followers accidentally promoted him as their "great leader," causing the world to name him an Emperor of the Sea. Though irritated, Mihawk and Crocodile accept the arrangement—using Buggy as the Cross Guild's public figurehead while they operate behind the scenes.
1087	196	"The War on the Island of Women! A Case Involving Koby the Hero"; Transliteration: "Nyōgashima no Ran! Eiyū Kobī no Ikken" (Japanese: 女ヶ島の乱！英雄コビーの一件)	Hazuki Omoya	Akiko Inoue	Yong-Ce Tu & Toshio Deguchi	December 10, 2023
As Marco departs the Red Hair Pirates' ship bound for Whitebeard's homeland, Sphinx, he recalls how leave Wano. It's revealed that Yamato chose to remain behind—not to join the crew—but to protect Wano from future invasions after witnessing Ryokugyu's assault. During their farewell, Luffy thanks Marco for saving him at Marineford. Marco graciously accepts, saying Ace would be proud of Luffy's growth and entrusts the new era to the younger generation. In the present, on Amazon Lily, Gloriosa mourns the island's devastation—its mountain cleaved and village ruined after the invasion by both Marines and the Blackbeard Pirates. A wounded Hancock laments that the Marines will surely return now that the Warlord system has been abolished. Weeks earlier, the Marines had attacked with two new Seraphim Pacifistas, modeled after child versions of Hancock and Mihawk, possessing Lunarian traits. Simultaneously, Blackbeard, alongside Vasco Shot and Catarina Devon, invaded to steal Hancock's Mero Mero no Mi powers. He clashed with the Mihawk-like Seraphim, who split the island's mountain in two. Meanwhile, Hancock petrified nearly everyone—Marines and pirates alike—except Koby. When she moved to attack him, Blackbeard restrained her with his Dark-Dark Fruit, revealing his 3.996 billion bounty. Hancock warned that killing her would leave everyone permanently petrified, as her powers were meaningless without her beauty.
1088	197	"Luffy's Dream"; Transliteration: "Rufi no Yume" (Japanese: ルフィの夢)	Tatsuya Nagamine	Shinzō Fujita	Kenji Yokoyama	December 17, 2023
After successfully repelling the Marines and Blackbeard Pirates from Amazon Lily, Hancock and her crew recount the battle alongside Rayleigh and Shakky—whose real name, Shakuyaku, is revealed as the former Kuja Pirates captain and Amazon Lily empress two generations prior. During the invasion, Blackbeard subdued Hancock and demanded she reverse his crew's petrification. He referenced Koby's role in the Rocky Port Incident, which enabled him to seize Fullalead. Hancock agreed to lift the curse if they withdrew, but Blackbeard refused, planning to kill her once freed. Before he could strike, Rayleigh arrived, overwhelming him with Conqueror's Haki and enforcing a truce, though he later admits he couldn't have defeated Blackbeard outright. The situation ends with Koby kidnapped by Blackbeard, while the Marines retreat with their Seraphim weapons—one resembling a young Hancock. At the Kamabakka Kingdom, the Revolutionary Army frets over Sabo's alleged assassination of King Cobra, though Dragon vows no forgiveness if it's true. Suddenly, Sabo contacts them, confirming he's alive as the Navy intercepts the call. Meanwhile, aboard the Thousand Sunny, the Straw Hats mourn Cobra's death and worry for Vivi's disappearance. Luffy reflects on his oath with Ace and Sabo, then reveals his ultimate dream—astonishing his crew.

== Recap specials ==
No. overall	No. in season	Title	Directed by	Animation directed by	Original release date
1004.5	SP–1	"Luffy-senpai Support Project! Barto's Secret Room!"; Transliteration: "Rufi Senpai Ōen Kikaku! Baruto no Himitsu no Heya!" (Japanese: ルフィ先輩応援企画！バルトの秘密の部屋！)	N/A	N/A	December 26, 2021
Bartolomeo and O-Tama recap the events of the Wano Country Arc up until when the Straw Hats assemble at the Performance Floor.
1015.5	SP–2	"A Special Episode to Admire Zoro-senpai and Sanji-senpai! Barto's Secret Room 2!"; Transliteration: "Zoro Sanji Senpai Tannō Kikaku! Baruto no Himitsu no Heya Sekando!" (Japanese: ゾロ・サンジ先輩堪能企画！バルトの秘密の部屋2！)	N/A	N/A	May 1, 2022
Bartolomeo and Law recap the events of the Wano Country Arc from Zoro and Sanji's point of view up until Luffy, Zoro, Law, Kidd, and Killer confront Kaido and Big Mom.
1022.5	SP–3	"A Comprehensive Anatomy! The Legend of Kozuki Oden!"; Transliteration: "Dai Tettei Kaibō! Kōzuki Oden Densetsu!" (Japanese: 大徹底解剖！光月おでん伝説！)	N/A	N/A	June 26, 2022
Yamato and Momonosuke recap the events of Oden's life to the formation of the Ninja-Pirate-Mink-Samurai Alliance.
1030.5	SP–4	"The Captain's Log of the Legend! Red-Haired Shanks!"; Transliteration: "Densetsu no Rogu! Akagami no Shankusu!" (Japanese: 伝説の記録(ログ)！赤髪のシャンクス！)	Tatsuya Nagamine	Toshio Deguchi	August 28, 2022
Various figures think back on their time knowing Shanks, including Koby and Makino.
1035.5	SP–5	"A Comprehensive Anatomy! Fierce Fight! The Five from the New Generation"; Transliteration: "Dai Tettei Kaibō! Gekitō! Gonin no Shin Sedai" (Japanese: 大徹底解剖！激闘！5人の新世代)	N/A	N/A	October 9, 2022
Recaps the fight on the Skull Dome's roof between the Worst Generation and the Emperors Kaidou and Big Mom.
1045.5	SP–6	"Recapping Fierce Fights! Straw Hats vs. Tobi Roppo"; Transliteration: "Dai Gekisen Tokushū! Mugiwara no Ichimi Buiesu Tobi Roppō" (Japanese: 大激戦特集！麦わらの一味VS飛び六砲)	N/A	N/A	December 25, 2022
Zoro and Sanji narrate in this recap of battles that took place between the Straw Hat Pirates and the Tobiroppo.
1061.5	SP–7	"Recapping Fierce Fights! Zoro vs. A Lead Performer!"; Transliteration: "Dai Gekisen Tokushū! Zoro tai Ōkanban!" (Japanese: 大激戦特集！ゾロVS大看板！)	N/A	N/A	May 14, 2023
Sanji and Chopper narrate the events of what has occurred in the battle between Zoro and King so far.
1065.5	SP–8	"Recapping Fierce Fights! The Countercharge Alliance vs. Big Mom"; Transliteration: "Dai Gekisen Tokushū! Hangeki Dōmei tai Biggu Mamu" (Japanese: 大激戦特集！反撃同盟VSビッグ・マム)	N/A	N/A	June 18, 2023
Nami and Nico Robin narrate the progress of Law and Kid's battle against Big Mom so far.
1073.5	SP–9	"Luffy-senpai Support Project! Barto's Secret Room 3!"; Transliteration: "Rufi Senpai Ōen Kikaku! Baruto no Himitsu no Heya Sādo!" (Japanese: ルフィ先輩応援企画！バルトの秘密の部屋3！)	N/A	N/A	August 27, 2023
Bartolomeo and O-Tama recap the events of the Wano Country Arc up from Luffy's second defeat against Kaido to Luffy awakening Gear Five.
1078.5	SP–10	"Luffy-senpai Support Project! Barto's Secret Room 4!"; Transliteration: "Rufi Senpai Ōen Kikaku! Baruto no Himitsu no Heya Fōsu!" (Japanese: ルフィ先輩応援企画！バルトの秘密の部屋4！)	N/A	N/A	October 8, 2023
Bartolomeo and O-Tama recap the events of the Wano Country Arc up from Gear Five Luffy battling Kaido to Luffy finally defeating Kaido.
1088.5	SP–11	"A Very Special Feature! Momonosuke's Road to Becoming a Great Shogun"; Transliteration: "Dai Tokushū! Momonosuke no Mei Shōgun e no Michi" (Japanese: 大特集！モモの助の名将軍への道)	N/A	N/A	December 24, 2023
A recap special covering the character Kozuki Momonosuke.

== Home media release ==
=== Japanese ===
Avex Pictures (Japan – Region 2/A)
Volume		Episodes	Release date	Ref.
20THシーズン ワノ国編	piece.1	892–894, 897	January 8, 2020	
20THシーズン ワノ国編	piece.2	898–901	February 5, 2020	
20THシーズン ワノ国編	piece.3	902–905	March 4, 2020	
20THシーズン ワノ国編	piece.4	906, 908–910	April 1, 2020	
20THシーズン ワノ国編	piece.5	911–914	May 8, 2020	
20THシーズン ワノ国編	piece.6	915–918	June 3, 2020	
20THシーズン ワノ国編	piece.7	919–922	July 1, 2020	
20THシーズン ワノ国編	piece.8	923–926	August 5, 2020	
20THシーズン ワノ国編	piece.9	927–930	September 2, 2020	
20THシーズン ワノ国編	piece.10	931–934	October 7, 2020	
20THシーズン ワノ国編	piece.11	935–938	November 4, 2020	
20THシーズン ワノ国編	piece.12	939–942	December 2, 2020	
20THシーズン ワノ国編	piece.13	943–946	January 6, 2021	
20THシーズン ワノ国編	piece.14	947–950	February 3, 2021	
20THシーズン ワノ国編	piece.15	951–954	March 3, 2021	
20THシーズン ワノ国編	piece.16	955–958	April 7, 2021	
20THシーズン ワノ国編	piece.17	959–962	May 7, 2021	
20THシーズン ワノ国編	piece.18	963–966	June 2, 2021	
20THシーズン ワノ国編	piece.19	967–970	July 7, 2021	
20THシーズン ワノ国編	piece.20	971–974	August 4, 2021	
20THシーズン ワノ国編	piece.21	975–978	September 1, 2021	
20THシーズン ワノ国編	piece.22	979–982	October 6, 2021	
20THシーズン ワノ国編	piece.23	983–986	November 3, 2021	
20THシーズン ワノ国編	piece.24	987–990	December 1, 2021	
20THシーズン ワノ国編	piece.25	991–994	January 5, 2022	
20THシーズン ワノ国編	piece.26	995–998	February 2, 2022	
20THシーズン ワノ国編	piece.27	999–1002	March 2, 2022	
20THシーズン ワノ国編	piece.28	1003–1005, SP–1	April 6, 2022	
20THシーズン ワノ国編	piece.29	1006–1009	May 4, 2022	
20THシーズン ワノ国編	piece.30	1010–1013	June 8, 2022	
20THシーズン ワノ国編	piece.31	1014–1016, SP–2	July 6, 2022	
20THシーズン ワノ国編	piece.32	1017–1020	August 3, 2022	
20THシーズン ワノ国編	piece.33	1021–1023, SP–3	September 7, 2022	
20THシーズン ワノ国編	piece.34	1024–1027	October 5, 2022	
20THシーズン ワノ国編	piece.35	1028, 1031–1032	November 2, 2022	
20THシーズン ワノ国編	piece.36	1033–1035	December 7, 2022	
20THシーズン ワノ国編	piece.37	1036–1037, SP–5	January 11, 2023	
20THシーズン ワノ国編	piece.38	1038–1040	February 1, 2023	
20THシーズン ワノ国編	piece.39	1041–1043	March 1, 2023	
20THシーズン ワノ国編	piece.40	1044–1045, SP–6	April 5, 2023	
20THシーズン ワノ国編	piece.41	1046–1048	May 10, 2023	
20THシーズン ワノ国編	piece.42	1049–1051	June 7, 2023	
20THシーズン ワノ国編	piece.43	1052–1054	July 5, 2023	
20THシーズン ワノ国編	piece.44	1055–1057	August 2, 2023	
20THシーズン ワノ国編	piece.45	1058–1060	September 6, 2023	
20THシーズン ワノ国編	piece.46	1061–1062, SP–7	October 4, 2023	
20THシーズン ワノ国編	piece.47	1063–1065	November 1, 2023	
20THシーズン ワノ国編	piece.48	1066–1067, SP–8	December 6, 2023	
20THシーズン ワノ国編	piece.49	1068–1070	January 10, 2024	
20THシーズン ワノ国編	piece.50	1071–1073	February 7, 2024	
20THシーズン ワノ国編	piece.51	1074–1075, SP–9	March 6, 2024	
20THシーズン ワノ国編	piece.52	1076–1078	April 3, 2024	
20THシーズン ワノ国編	piece.53	SP–10, 1079–1081	May 8, 2024	
20THシーズン ワノ国編	piece.54	1082–1085	June 5, 2024	
20THシーズン ワノ国編	piece.55	1086–1088, SP–11	July 3, 2024	
Romance Dawn		1, 907	January 24, 2020	
映画連動特別編「One Piece Stampede 前日譚」		895–896	February 28, 2020	
「One Piece Film Red」映画連動特別編		4, 1029–1030, SP–4	June 14, 2023	
One Piece Log Collection	"Levely"	878–891	September 24, 2021	
One Piece Log Collection	"Wanokuni"	892–894, 897–905	June 24, 2022	
One Piece Log Collection	"Kin'Emon"	906, 908–917	July 29, 2022	
One Piece Log Collection	"Hananomiyako"	918–929	August 26, 2022	
One Piece Log Collection	"Udon"	930–943	September 30, 2022	
One Piece Log Collection	"Hiyor"	944–956	October 28, 2022	
One Piece Log Collection	"Kuri"	957–965	June 30, 2023	
One Piece Log Collection	"Oden"	966–976	July 28, 2023	
One Piece Log Collection	"Jinbe"	977–989	August 25, 2023	
One Piece Log Collection	"Yamato"	990–1004	September 29, 2023	
One Piece Log Collection	"Korioni"	1005–1018	June 26, 2024	
One Piece Log Collection	"Kaidou"	1019–1033	July 31, 2024	
One Piece Log Collection	"Demon"	1034–1045	August 28, 2024	
One Piece Log Collection	"Queen"	1046–1055	June 25, 2025	
One Piece Log Collection	"King"	1056–1067	July 30, 2025	
One Piece Log Collection	"Gear5"	1068–1077	August 27, 2025	
One Piece Log Collection	"Momonosuke"	1078–1088	September 24, 2025	

=== English ===
Crunchyroll LLC (North America – Region 1/A); Crunchyroll UK and Ireland (UK and Ireland - Region 2/B); Madman Entertainment (Australia and New Zealand – Region 4/B)
Volume		Episodes	Release date			ISBN	Ref.
Volume		Episodes	NA	UK & IE	AUS & NZ	ISBN	Ref.
Season Fourteen	Voyage One	892–903	December 10, 2024	N/A	N/A	ISBN N/A	
Season Fourteen	Voyage Two	904–916	February 4, 2025	N/A	N/A	ISBN N/A	
Season Fourteen	Voyage Three	917–928	March 25, 2025	N/A	N/A	ISBN N/A	
Season Fourteen	Voyage Four	929–940	May 27, 2025	N/A	N/A	ISBN N/A	
Season Fourteen	Voyage Five	941–952	June 24, 2025	N/A	N/A	ISBN N/A	
Season Fourteen	Voyage Six	953–964	August 19, 2025	N/A	N/A	ISBN N/A	
Season Fourteen	Voyage Seven	965–976	November 25, 2025	N/A	N/A	ISBN N/A	
Season Fourteen	Voyage Eight	977–988	January 26, 2026	N/A	N/A	ISBN N/A	
Season Fourteen	Voyage Nine	989–1000	April 7, 2026	N/A	N/A	ISBN N/A	
Season Fourteen	Voyage Ten	1001–1012	August 17, 2026	N/A	N/A	ISBN N/A	
Season Fourteen	Voyage Eleven	1013–1024	TBA	N/A	N/A	ISBN N/A	
Season Fourteen	Voyage Twelve	1025–1028, 1031–1036	TBA	N/A	N/A	ISBN N/A	
Season Fourteen	Voyage Thirteen	1037–1048	TBA	N/A	N/A	ISBN N/A	
Season Fourteen	Voyage Fourteen	1049–1061.5	TBA	N/A	N/A	ISBN N/A	
Season Fourteen	Voyage Fifteen	1062–1073	TBA	N/A	N/A	ISBN N/A	
Season Fourteen	Voyage Sixteen	1074-1085	TBA	N/A	N/A	ISBN N/A	
Season Fifteen	Voyage One	1086–1096	TBA	N/A	N/A	ISBN N/A	
Collection	37	892–916	April 8, 2025	August 25, 2025	N/A	ISBN N/A	
Collection	38	917–940	August 26, 2025	October 6, 2025	N/A	ISBN N/A	
Collection	39	941–964	November 25, 2025	December 15, 2025	N/A	ISBN N/A	
Collection	40	965–988	October 20, 2026	October 26, 2026	N/A	ISBN N/A	
One Piece Film Red		1029–1030, SP–4	July 11, 2023	N/A	N/A	ISBN N/A	
