= One Piece season 21 =

Season of television series

One Piece
- Season 21; Egghead
- Cover for the first Japanese home media volume of the season
- No. of episodes: 67

Release
- Original network: Fuji Television
- Original release: January 7, 2024 – December 28, 2025

Season chronology
- ← Previous; Season 20 Next → Season 22

The twenty-first season of the One Piece anime television series is produced by Toei Animation, directed by Tatsuya Nagamine (until episode 1122), Wataru Matsumi (beginning with episode 1123), Satoshi Itō and Yasunori Koyama. The season began broadcasting on Fuji Television on January 7, 2024. Like the rest of the series, the season follows Monkey D. Luffy's adventures with his Straw Hat Pirates. The season adapts material from the "Egghead" story arc, from the rest of the 105th volume to the beginning of the 111th volume of the manga series One Piece by Eiichiro Oda. It deals with the Straw Hat Pirates meeting Dr. Vegapunk on the futuristic-looking island, Egghead, which leads into an event that shocks the world.

In October 2024, it was announced that the anime series would go on hiatus until April 2025, and that a remastered and re-edited version of the "Fish-Man Island" story arc would air in the show's timeslot during the break. After returning, the show would move to Sunday nights for the first time since 2006, marking the anime's return to a primetime network timeslot. Episode 1123 premiered on April 5, 2025, as part of the network's Premium Saturday timeslot before moving to its fixed Sunday night slot a day later, beginning with episode 1124 on April 6.

Six pieces of theme music are used for the season thus far. From episode 1089 to 1122, the opening theme song is "Uuuuus!" (あーーっす！, Āssu!; a drawn-out spelling of 'Us!'), performed by Hiroshi Kitadani, while the ending theme song is "Dear Sunrise", performed by Maki Otsuki. From episode 1123 to episode 1138, the opening theme song is "Angel & Devil" (天使と悪魔, Tenshi to Akuma), performed by Gre4n Boyz, which is also used as the special ending theme in episode 1137, while the ending theme song is "The 1", performed by Muque. From episode 1139 onwards, the opening theme song is "Carmine" (カーマイン), performed by Ellegarden, while the ending theme song is "Punks", performed by Chameleon Lime Whoopie Pie.

== Episodes ==
| No. overall (Note: Episode number by Toei Animation's count) | No. in season | Title (Note: Title of the episode: literally translated, romanized using Hepburn romanization, and in kanji form) | Directed by | Written by | Animation directed by | Original release date (Note: Date the episode originally aired on Fuji Television) | Viewership rating (Note: Viewership numbers reflect the Japanese TV animation weekly ratings in the Kantō region.) |
|---|---|---|---|---|---|---|---|
| 1089 | 1 | "Entering a New Chapter! Luffy and Sabo's Paths!"; Transliteration: "Shinshō Totsunyū! Rufi to Sabo no Shinro!" (Japanese: 新章突入！ルフィとサボの針路！) | Nozomu Shishido | Jin Tanaka | Ziwei He, Keisuke Mori, Shūichi Itō & Midori Matsuda | January 7, 2024 | 3.3% |
After leaving Wano, the Straw Hats pursue the final Road Poneglyph, vital to Luffy's dream of becoming the King of the Pirates. Meanwhile, Sabo's communication with the Revolutionary Army is abruptly halted by the Marines, resulting in the destruction of Lulusia. Later, while the Straw Hats rescue a girl from the sea, they encounter a massive shark that threatens their ship.
| 1090 | 2 | "A New Island! Future Island Egghead"; Transliteration: "Atarashī Shima! Mirai Shima Egguheddo" (Japanese: 新しい島！未来島エッグヘッド) | Yusuke Suzuki | Tomohiro Nakayama | Masayuki Takagi | January 14, 2024 | 3.7% |
Luffy, Chopper, and the girl, who reveals herself as Jewelry Bonney, are rescued by Jinbe. The rest of the crew is attacked by the shark and capsizes, but are eventually saved by a woman who claims to be Dr. Vegapunk. Meanwhile, Helmeppo seeks Prince Grus' aid to save Koby.
| 1091 | 3 | "Brimming with the Future! An Adventure on the Island of Science!"; Transliteration: "Mirai Mansai! Kagaku no Kuni no Bōken!" (Japanese: 未来満載！科学の国の冒険！) | Directed by : Shō Matsui; Storyboarded by : Shō Matsui, Yasunori Koyama & Satoshi Itō | Shōji Yonemura | Keita Saitō & Kimitaka Itō | January 21, 2024 | 3.2% |
Lilith, a satellite of Vegapunk, attacks the Thousand Sunny, but is stopped by Shaka, another satellite of Vegapunk, who identifies Zoro and Robin. He orders Lilith to bring the Straw Hats to him. Meanwhile, Luffy, Bonney, Jinbe, and Chopper explore Egghead. Bonney threatens to get revenge on Vegapunk for turning her father, into a cyborg. They encounter holograms of Egghead's inventions and meet another satellite, Atlas, who also reveals herself to be Vegapunk.
| 1092 | 4 | "Bonney's Lamentation! Darkness Lurking on the Future Island"; Transliteration: "Bonī no Dōkoku! Mirai Shima ni Hisomu Yami" (Japanese: ボニーの慟哭！未来島に潜む闇) | Katsumi Tokoro | Ryo Yamazaki | Shigefumi Shingaki | January 28, 2024 | 3.5% |
A CP0 unit that resembles Bartholomew Kuma is dispatched to Egghead to eliminate Dr. Vegapunk. Meanwhile, as Luffy's group faces an assault from a Pacifista, Bonney recognizes its resemblance to Kuma and reveals him to be her father. She orders Luffy to stop attacking it. In another part of the New World, the Heart Pirates come under attack from the Blackbeard Pirates.
| 1093 | 5 | "The Winner Takes All! Law vs. Blackbeard!"; Transliteration: "Shōsha Sōtori! Rō tai Kurohige!" (Japanese: 勝者総取り！ローVS(たい)黒ひげ！) | Shō Inuzuka | Atsuhiro Tomioka | Kazuya Hisada & Katsumi Ishizuka | February 11, 2024 | 2.9% |
After an assault by the Blackbeard Pirates, the Heart Pirates flee and dock on a nearby island. Trafalgar Law is confronted and attacked by Doc Q. Van Augur and Burgess, but Law easily counters. Blackbeard aims to seize their Road Poneglyphs, which commences a heated battle. Meanwhile, Charlotte Pudding is revealed to be a prisoner on board the Blackbeard Pirates' ship. At Marine Headquarters, Sakazuki awaits the outcome of the battle between Law and Blackbeard. Blackbeard uses his powers to retaliate against Law's attacks by shrouding him in darkness.
| 1094 | 6 | "The Mystery Deepens! Egghead Labophase"; Transliteration: "Fukamaru Nazo! Egguheddo Rabofēzu" (Japanese: 深まる謎！エッグヘッド研究層(ラボフェーズ)) | Yasuhiro Tanabe | Akiko Inoue | Masahiro Kitazaki | February 18, 2024 | 3.1% |
Luffy, Chopper, Jinbe, and Bonney evade the Pacifista after Bonney uses her Devil Fruit powers to confuse it. Jinbe reveals Kuma's backstory as a deposed king, later becoming a pirate and eventually a cyborg. Meanwhile, Lilith leads the other Straw Hats to Egghead's Labophase. There, they encounter a Seraphim resembling Jinbe. Shaka, one of the six Vegapunk satellites, contacts Dragon, informing him that he predicts his own demise.
| 1095 | 7 | "The Brain of a Genius - Six Vegapunks!"; Transliteration: "Tensai no Zunō - Roku-nin no Begapanku!" (Japanese: 天才の頭脳 6(ろく)人のベガパンク！) | Directed by : Eri Hyun; Storyboarded by : Masahiro Hosoda & Satoshi Itō | Shinzō Fujita | Toshio Deguchi, RA Craft & Grand Guerilla | February 25, 2024 | 3.0% |
The Straw Hats fall into Lilith's trap and are forced to face S-Shark, who wields multiple powers. Sanji, Robin, and Usopp's attacks fail against it. Lilith, along with two other satellites of Vegapunk, Edison, and Pythagoras control S-Shark from afar. Edison conducts experiments on S-Shark to help it evolve. Shaka halts the fight, and he reveals Egghead's history. Meanwhile, Luffy's group finds an old, advanced robot in a scrapyard.
| 1096 | 8 | "A Forbidden Piece of History! A Theory Concerning a Kingdom"; Transliteration: "Kinji Rareta Rekishi! Aru Ōkoku no Kasetsu" (Japanese: 禁じられた歴史！ある王国の仮説) | Tasuku Shimaya | Jin Tanaka | Masahiro Shimanuki | March 3, 2024 | 3.2% |
Shaka discusses his theory with Sanji's group regarding an ancient kingdom connected to the Void Century. He believes this kingdom was eradicated by the World Government to erase its history. Shaka links this theory to the Ohara Incident, where scholars sought to uncover this history. During his visit to Ohara, Shaka found discarded books that were saved by the scholars during the island's destruction. Meanwhile, Luffy and Chopper investigate an ancient robot and encounter the real Dr. Vegapunk.
| 1097 | 9 | "The Will of Ohara! The Inherited Research"; Transliteration: "Ohara no Ishi! Uketsugareru Kenkyū" (Japanese: オハラの意志！受け継がれる研究) | Hazuki Omoya | Tomohiro Nakayama | Kenji Yokoyama | March 17, 2024 | 3.1% |
Shaka tells Sanji's group about how the giants saved Ohara's books 22 years ago when Dr. Vegapunk met up with Dragon. He also confirms to Robin the identity of their leader. At the scrapyard, Bonney attempts to kill Vegapunk. Meanwhile, a masked assassin approaches Egghead.
| 1098 | 10 | "The Eccentric Dream of a Genius!"; Transliteration: "Kisō Tengai! Tensai ga Omoiegaku Yume!" (Japanese: 奇想天外！天才が想い描く夢！) | Toshinori Fukuzawa | Shōji Yonemura | Shūichi Itō | March 24, 2024 | 3.1% |
Luffy's group questions Vegapunk about the Iron Giant, a legendary robot linked to an ancient power source. Vegapunk desires to leave Egghead to pursue his ambition of harnessing infinite energy, making him a target for CP0 assassins. Meanwhile, CP0 led by Rob Lucci forcefully makes his way into Egghead. Kuma breaks free during repairs in Kamabakka Kingdom, escaping Dragon and Ivankov's pursuit.
| 1099 | 11 | "Preparations for Interception! Rob Lucci Strikes!"; Transliteration: "Geigeki Junbi! Robu Rutchi Shūrai!" (Japanese: 迎撃準備！ロブ・ルッチ襲来！) | Directed by : Kenichi Takeshita; Storyboarded by : Kenichi Takeshita & Yutaka Nakashima | Ryo Yamazaki | Masayuki Takagi | March 31, 2024 | 2.9% |
As Lucci's group launches their invasion of Egghead, Shaka begins the preparations to deal with it. However, Atlas ignores orders and is damaged when attempting to fight Lucci. Upon arriving at that location, an angry Luffy prepares to engage Lucci in battle.
| 1100 | 12 | "Powers on a Different Level! Luffy vs. Lucci!"; Transliteration: "I Jigen no Chikara! Rufi tai Rutchi!" (Japanese: 異次元の力！ルフィVS(たい)ルッチ！) | Nozomu Shishido | Atsuhiro Tomioka | Keita Saitō, Kimitaka Itō & Hiroyasu Oda | April 7, 2024 | 3.0% |
Sakazuki learns that the Straw Hats are on Egghead and are aligning with Vegapunk. He sends Kizaru to support Lucci and the CP0 agents. Despite being given orders, Lucci disobeys and battles Luffy. They both transform into their awakened forms. Vegapunk explains the uniqueness of Luffy's Devil Fruit, linking it to Nika, the Sun God. Sentomaru arrives and aids Luffy with the help of the Seraphims, but he ends up being knocked out by Lucci's attack.
| 1101 | 13 | "The Strongest Form of Humanity! The Seraphim's Powers!"; Transliteration: "Saikyō no Jinrui! Serafimu no Nōryoku!" (Japanese: 最強の人類！セラフィムの能力！) | Wataru Matsumi | Akiko Inoue | Yong-Ce Tu & Ziwei He | April 21, 2024 | N/A |
The battle between Luffy and Lucci continues, with Luffy overpowering Lucci. The rest of the Straw Hats learn from Vegapunk that certain Devil Fruit powers are able to be replicated through blood transfusion. Luffy rejoins Jinbe and the others, as the group makes their way to the Labophase area of Egghead. After his defeat, Lucci is reunited with Kaku and Stussy.
| 1102 | 14 | "Sinister Schemes! The Operation to Escape Egghead"; Transliteration: "Ugomeku Inbō! Egguheddo Dasshutsu Sakusen" (Japanese: 蠢く陰謀！エッグヘッド脱出作戦) | Yusuke Suzuki | Shinzō Fujita | Shigefumi Shingaki | April 28, 2024 | 2.6% |
Luffy, Bonney, and Jinbe make it to Vegapunk's lab, where Atlas is tended to. With the defeat of Sentomaru, CP0 regains control of the Seraphims. Kuma, having escaped the Kammabakka Kingdom, crashes at Red Port. Vegapunk calls on the help of another ally to escape the island. A mysterious force deactivates the Frontier Dome defense system, allowing CP0 to enter. Kizaru is seen approaching Egghead with a marine fleet.
| 1103 | 15 | "Turn Back My Father! Bonney's Futile Wish!"; Transliteration: "Chichi o Modose! Hakanaki Bonī no Negai!" (Japanese: 父を戻せ！儚きボニーの願い！) | Katsumi Tokoro | Jin Tanaka | Kazuya Hisada | May 5, 2024 | 2.6% |
Kaku and Zoro engage in a battle after Kaku fails to destroy the Thousand Sunny. Bonney pursues Dr. Vegapunk, demanding answers about Kuma. The Kid Pirates arrive at Elbaf. Meanwhile, Garp makes his way to G-14 to announce his rescue mission to retrieve Koby.
| 1104 | 16 | "A Desperate Situation! The Seraphim's All-out Attack!"; Transliteration: "Zettai Zetsumei! Serafimu Sō Kōgeki!" (Japanese: 絶体絶命！セラフィム総攻撃！) | Directed by : Shō Matsui; Storyboarded by : Shō Matsui, Yasunori Koyama & Shō Inuzuka | Tomohiro Nakayama | Masahiro Kitazaki | May 12, 2024 | 2.7% |
Bonney discovers a glowing paw, realizing it contains Kuma's memories stored before he became a cyborg. Vegapunk tries to deceive her but fails. Meanwhile, Kuma clashes with the Marines while attempting to climb the Red Line. In the fight between Kaku and Zoro, Kaku unveils his enhanced Devil Fruit form. Suddenly, Stussy reveals her true nature and betrays Kaku and Lucci, attacking them both before turning her attention towards Zoro.
| 1105 | 17 | "A Beautiful Act of Treason! The Spy, Stussy!"; Transliteration: "Uruwashiki Hangyaku! Naitsū-sha Sutyūshī" (Japanese: 麗しき反逆！内通者ステューシー) | Hazuki Omoya | Shōji Yonemura | Toshio Deguchi, RA Craft & Grand Guerilla | May 19, 2024 | 2.9% |
Stussy reveals herself to be a spy for Vegapunk. Zoro briefly battles S-Hawk until Edison arrives and regains control over the Seraphims. Stussy restrains Lucci and Kaku, neutralizing their powers. As they prepare to leave, Luffy and Chopper search for Vegapunk and Bonney, finding the former missing. Days earlier, on Sphinx Island, Marines invade a village, seeking Whitebeard's treasure, but Weevil intervenes. Weevil's mother tells Marco that Ryokugyu captured Weevil. While heading towards Egghead, Kizaru and Saint Jaygarcia Saturn, one of the Five Elders, talk about Dr. Vegapunk.
| 1106 | 18 | "Trouble Occurs! Seek Dr. Vegapunk!"; Transliteration: "Ijō Hassei! Sagase! Dokutā Begapanku" (Japanese: 異常発生！探せ！Dr.(ドクター)ベガパンク) | Directed by : Eri Hyun; Storyboarded by : Yasunori Koyama & Eri Hyun | Ryo Yamazaki | Eisaku Inoue | May 26, 2024 | 2.8% |
Sentomaru sends numerous Pacifista Mark III units to handle World Government officials. Meanwhile, Shaka informs the Straw Hat Pirates of the current situation, resulting in the group setting out to find Vegapunk, leaving Luffy and Zoro to guard unconscious Lucci and Kaku. Bonney delves into Kuma's memories to understand her father's cyborg transformation. On Morgans' airship, Morgans creates a false news article depicting Luffy as Dr. Vegapunk's kidnapper, which is opposed by Vivi.
| 1107 | 19 | "A Shudder! The Evil Hand Creeping Up on the Laboratory"; Transliteration: "Senritsu! Kenkyūjo e Shinobiyoru Ma no Te" (Japanese: 戦慄！研究所へ忍び寄る魔の手) | Tasuku Shimaya | Akiko Inoue | Kenji Yokoyama | June 2, 2024 | 2.7% |
Bonney delves into her father's memories, witnessing his childhood trauma. Meanwhile, chaos ensues in the lab as an explosion occurs, cutting off communication and disabling security measures. Luffy and Shaka realize someone is causing trouble. The rest of the Straw Hats continue searching for Dr. Vegapunk. Usopp's group finds Pythagoras, damaged from the explosion, while S-Snake petrifies York.
| 1108 | 20 | "Incomprehensible! The Seraphim's Rebellion!"; Transliteration: "Rikai Funō! Serafimu no Hangyaku!" (Japanese: 理解不能！セラフィムの反逆！) | Directed by : Atsuo Yamai; Storyboarded by : Tatsuya Nagamine | Shinzō Fujita | Masahiro Shimanuki | June 9, 2024 | 2.8% |
As Usopp's group faces off against S-Snake, Zoro and Luffy are trapped in their own battle against S-Bear and S-Hawk. Shaka suspects that one of the Vegapunks may be controlling the Seraphim and realizes that they're in a troubling situation with communication cut off. Lucci and Kaku make a suggestion to Luffy and Zoro: that they form a temporary alliance.
| 1109 | 21 | "A Tough Decision! An Unusual United Front!"; Transliteration: "Kujū no Ketsudan! Ishoku no Kyōtō Sensen!" (Japanese: 苦渋の決断！異色の共闘戦線！) | Directed by : Nanami Michibata; Storyboarded by : Masahiro Hosoda & Nanami Michibata | Jin Tanaka | Masayuki Takagi | June 23, 2024 | 3.5% |
Zoro and Luffy battle S-Hawk and S-Bear, aided by Lucci and Kaku after negotiations for a temporary truce. Meanwhile, on Elbaf, Shanks and his crew prepare to face the Kid Pirates at sea, offering Kid a choice between surrendering his copies of the Road Poneglyphs or engaging in battle.
| 1110 | 22 | "Survive! Deadly Combat with the Strongest Form of Humanity!"; Transliteration: "Ikinokore! Saikyō no Jinrui to no Shitō" (Japanese: 生き残れ！最強の人類との死闘) | Katsumi Tokoro | Tomohiro Nakayama | Shūichi Itō & Nobuyuki Iwai | June 30, 2024 | 2.7% |
Luffy, Zoro, Lucci, and Kaku battle S-Bear and S-Hawk, whose Lunarian abilities resist attacks. Zoro and Shaka discover their weakness: vulnerability when their flames are extinguished. On Building A's third floor, Nami, Brook, and Edison confront S-Shark, with Sanji joining in. Meanwhile, Lilith, Franky, Pythagoras, and Usopp face S-Snake; Usopp and Lilith are both petrified by S-Snake. In the basement, Shaka finds Cipher Pol agents and Vegapunk before he is fatally attacked.
| 1111 | 23 | "The Second Ohara! The Mastermind's Ambition!"; Transliteration: "Ohara no Sairai! Kuromaku no Yabō!" (Japanese: オハラの再来！黒幕の野望！) | Toshinori Fukuzawa | Shōji Yonemura | Keita Saitō, Kimitaka Itō & Keisuke Mori | July 7, 2024 | 2.9% |
Kizaru's ship heads to Egghead with Saint Jaygarcia Saturn on board. Franky fails to stop S-Snake from destroying Pythagoras. Robin, Chopper, and Atlas search for Vegapunk, while Sanji battles S-Shark. Luffy, Zoro, Lucci, and Kaku discover S-Hawk has escaped, prompting Zoro and Kaku to pursue it. Three months earlier, the World Government learned about Vegapunk's Void Century research, mobilizing forces against him. Vegapunk learns York betrayed him and killed Shaka to become a World Noble.
| 1112 | 24 | "Clash! Shanks vs. Eustass Kid"; Transliteration: "Gekitotsu! Shankusu tai Yūsutasu Kiddo" (Japanese: 激突！シャンクスVS(たい)ユースタス・キッド) | Wataru Matsumi | Ryo Yamazaki | Yong-Ce Tu & Ziwei He | July 14, 2024 | 3.1% |
Hours earlier, York planned a covert attack using the Seraphim, sparing herself, Vegapunk, and Cipher Pol hostages in the Labophase. Meanwhile, the Red Hair Pirates clash with the Kid Pirates at sea. Despite Kid's intention to fire a Damned Punk, Shanks foresees his move and swiftly defeats him with Kamusari. The Kid Pirates surrender, offering their Road Poneglyphs, but Shanks departs without accepting them. Dorry and Brogy destroy the Kid Pirates' ship, sending Kid into the depths of the ocean.
| 1113 | 25 | "Run, Koby! A Desperate Escape Strategy!"; Transliteration: "Hashire Kobī! Kesshi no Dasshutsu Sakusen!" (Japanese: 走れコビー！決死の脱出作戦！) | Yusuke Suzuki | Atsuhiro Tomioka | Shigefumi Shingaki & Toshio Deguchi | July 28, 2024 | 2.7% |
Perona breaks into the Blackbeard Pirates' prison to rescue her captain, Gecko Moria, and frees Koby, who then helps free other prisoners. Koby, now with a high bounty, distracts a mob of pirates to protect the others. He recalls Blackbeard's plan to trade him for Hachinosu's entry into the World Government. The pirates face attacks from clay golems, SWORD member Kujaku, and a Marine force led by Garp and Tashigi.
| 1114 | 26 | "For the Beloved Pupil - The Fist of Vice Admiral Garp!"; Transliteration: "Manadeshi no Tame - Gāpu Chūjō no Genkotsu!" (Japanese: 愛弟子のため ガープ中将の拳骨！) | Hazuki Omoya | Akiko Inoue | Kazuya Hisada & Hone Hone | August 4, 2024 | 2.7% |
Koby finds himself cornered by a mob of pirates. When they attempt to shoot him, their guns fire flowers instead of bullets due to Hibari's use of Flower Bullets. Garp arrives and uses his Galaxy Impact attack, causing massive destruction on Hachinosu Island. As Koby and Hibari prepare to rejoin Garp, Kuzan encases Hibari in ice and reveals his new allegiance to Blackbeard after resigning from the Marines.
| 1115 | 27 | "The Navy Surprised! The Navy Headquarters' Former Admiral, Kuzan"; Transliteration: "Kaigun Kyōgaku! Moto Kaigun Honbu Taishō Kuzan" (Japanese: 海軍驚愕！元海軍本部大将クザン) | Nozomu Shishido | Shinzō Fujita | Masahiro Kitazaki, Hiroyasu Oda, Hone Hone, RA Craft & Grand Guerrilla | August 11, 2024 | 2.7% |
In the past, Blackbeard and Kuzan initially clashed but resolved their conflict over drinks, with Kuzan joining Blackbeard's crew. In the present, Garp battles Kuzan. On Winner Island, Bepo uses a drug to transform into his Sulong form to retaliate against Blackbeard and his crew before swimming away with Trafalgar Law.
| 1116 | 28 | "Let's Go Get It! Buggy's Big Declaration"; Transliteration: "Tori ni Ikō ze! Bagī no Dai Sengen" (Japanese: 取りに行こうぜ！バギーの大宣言) | Directed by : Eri Hyun; Storyboarded by : Satoshi Itō & Eri Hyun | Jin Tanaka | Eisaku Inoue | August 18, 2024 | 2.9% |
Tsuru and Sengoku learn of Vice Admiral T Bone's murder by a poor civilian seeking bounty money. Buggy, embarrassed by his flagship's design, is tortured by Mihawk and Crocodile, who want the Cross Guild to focus on crime for profit. During the torture, Buggy had a flashback of him ending his friendship with Red-Haired Shanks. He told his crew through a speaker to find the One Piece, which he stopped doing long ago. Meanwhile, Sabo returns to Momoiro Island with Lulusia refugees. High-ranking members of the Revolutionary Army become happy to see Sabo again. The Army allows the refugees to join their ranks. Sabo briefs Ivankov and Dragon on the true events of the Reverie.
| 1117 | 29 | "Sabo Returns - The Shocking Truth to Be Told!"; Transliteration: "Sabo no Kikan - Katarareru Shōgeki no Shinjitsu!" (Japanese: サボの帰還 語られる衝撃の真実！) | Directed by : Tasuku Shimaya; Storyboarded by : Hazuki Omoya & Tasuku Shimaya | Tomohiro Nakayama | Kenji Yokoyama | September 1, 2024 | 2.8% |
Sabo, Dragon, and Ivankov celebrate their success at the Reverie, including revolutions in eight nations and attacks on World Government suppliers. Dragon warns of retaliation from the God's Knights but assures Sabo that he's a hero despite Cobra's assassination. In a flashback, during the chaos at Mary Geoise, the Revolutionary Army freed slaves and fought Fujitora and Ryokugyu. Sabo learned that Charlos was using Kuma to enslave Shirahoshi and focused on rescuing Kuma. Meanwhile, Cobra meets with the Five Elders alone, asking his guards to protect Vivi.
| 1118 | 30 | "The Holy Land in Tumult! Sai and Leo's Full-Power Blow!"; Transliteration: "Seichi Sōzen! Sai to Reo Konshin no Ichigeki!" (Japanese: 聖地騒然！サイとレオ渾身の一撃！) | Kenichi Takeshita | Shōji Yonemura | Masayuki Takagi | September 8, 2024 | 2.5% |
At Pangaea Castle, Sabo teams up with Jewelry Bonney, giving keys to Karasu to free Kuma and the slaves. Bonney heads to Egghead to seek Dr. Vegapunk's help. Cobra questions the Five Elders about Queen Lili's fate and the "D." initial. In the courtyard, Charlos chains up Shirahoshi, intending to keep her as his pet. However, Leo and Sai, with Mjosgard's support, rescue her. In the throne room, Imu shocks Cobra by sitting on the Empty Throne and mentioning Queen Lili's name.
| 1119 | 31 | "The Entrusted Message! King Cobra's Resolve"; Transliteration: "Takusareta Messēji! Kobura-Ō no Kakugo" (Japanese: 託された伝言(メッセージ)！コブラ王の覚悟) | Yasuhiro Tanabe | Atsuhiro Tomioka | Ziwei He & Masahiro Shimanuki | September 15, 2024 | 2.5% |
Imu reveals to Cobra that "D." links to a historic mistake by Nefertari Lili, which unleashed the Poneglyphs. After Cobra confirms Lili's full name has a "D." in it, Imu stabs him. Sabo intervenes but flees with Cobra, who wants to send a message to Luffy and Vivi that the entire Nefertari family has "D." in their names. Sabo escapes, while Wapol, who witnesses Cobra's murder, runs away. Meanwhile, Vivi is restrained by CP0 but manages to escape with Wapol.
| 1120 | 32 | "The World Is Shaken! The Ruler's Judgment and the Five Elders' Actions!"; Transliteration: "Yuragu Sekai! Shihai-sha no Shinpan to Gorōsei no Shidō!" (Japanese: 揺らぐ世界！支配者の審判と五老星の始動！) | Katsumi Tokoro | Atsuhiro Tomioka | Shūichi Itō & Toshio Deguchi | September 22, 2024 | 2.8% |
After fleeing from Mary Geoise, Vivi and Wapol stow away to the Eigis Kingdom. Wapol contacts Morgans but withholds details about the Empty Throne Room. Meanwhile, Sabo arrives in Lulusia, where he is falsely celebrated as a hero following Cobra's assassination. The Five Elders test the Mother Flame on Lulusia, resulting in its destruction. Ivankov connects Imu to a member of the First Twenty, suggesting potential immortality. At Mary Geoise, Saint Mjosgard is executed by Saint Figarland Garling for defending Princess Shirahoshi.
| 1121 | 33 | "Garp and Kuzan - A Master and a Pupil's Beliefs Clash"; Transliteration: "Gāpu to Kuzan - Shōtotsu Suru Shitei no Seigi" (Japanese: ガープとクザン 衝突する師弟の正義) | Directed by : Shō Matsui; Storyboarded by : Toshinori Fukuzawa & Shō Matsui | Akiko Inoue | Masahiro Kitazaki & Yong-Ce Tu | October 6, 2024 | 2.5% |
At the Marine ship scrapyard, Commodore Brannew recounts how Garp used battleships as punching bags in his youth, a practice later adopted by Kuzan. On Hachinosu, Garp confronts the Blackbeard Pirates, instructing his crew to retreat while fending off their attacks. Koby rushes to help a woman but is ambushed by Shiryu. Garp saves him just in time, punching Shiryu into the ground despite being stabbed. In the past, Kuzan asks Garp to train him, leading to a bond between them. In the present, Garp fights Kuzan as Pizarro threatens Garp's ship, reassuring his crew that justice will prevail.
| 1122 | 34 | "The Last Lesson! Impact Inherited"; Transliteration: "Saigo no Oshie! Uketsugareta Inpakuto" (Japanese: 最後の教え！受け継がれた拳骨(インパクト)) | Yasunori Koyama | Shinzō Fujita | Kazuya Hisada, Keita Saitō, Katsumi Ishizuka, Hiroyasu Oda & Chiharu Akakura | October 13, 2024 | 2.5% |
In the past, Garp taught Marine recruits about the value of protecting the future by prioritizing a baby over an old man. Before being captured, Koby sacrificed himself to Blackbeard to save 800 Marines. While facing Avalo Pizarro's giant hand, Garp instructs Koby to attack. Koby successfully uses his Honesty Impact to destroy Pizarro's hand. The Marines celebrate, but Garp tells them to abandon him and leave for safety as he begins to freeze over. The next day's headlines cover Koby's success, Garp's disappearance, and Luffy's situation on Egghead.
| 1123 | 35 | "The World Shakes! The Straw Hats' Hostage Situation"; Transliteration: "Sekai Shinkan! Mugiwara no Ichimi Tatekomori Jiken" (Japanese: 世界震撼！麦わらの一味立てこもり事件) | Satoshi Itō | Shōji Yonemura | Kenji Yokoyama | April 5, 2025 | 3.9% |
The residents of Dawn Island discuss Luffy and Garp's recent actions, noting Garp's disappearance and presumed survival. Meanwhile, a global earthquake shakes various locations, with its epicenter traced back to the destruction of the Lulusia Kingdom, causing sea levels to rise and flooding several islands. A Marine fleet led by Admiral Kizaru heads towards Egghead to confront Dr. Vegapunk and the Straw Hats. Kizaru and Sentomaru discuss the failed CP0 mission, while the World Government plans to sink any ships attempting to escape Egghead. York negotiates with the Five Elders, who ask her to recreate the Mother Flame in exchange for protection and the status of a World Noble. Amid rising tensions, York is revealed to be held hostage by the Straw Hats.
| 1124 | 36 | "Completely Surrounded! The Operation to Escape Egghead"; Transliteration: "Zenmen Hōi! Egguheddo Dasshutsu Sakusen" (Japanese: 全面包囲！エッグヘッド脱出作戦) | Aimi Yamauchi | Jin Tanaka | Eisaku Inoue | April 6, 2025 | 3.7% |
Luffy communicates with the Five Elders, confirming his alliance with Dr. Vegapunk and demanding the fleet's withdrawal for York's safety. Meanwhile, Saturn prioritizes York, Punk Records, and the power plant, deeming everything else expendable. York threatens to destroy Egghead if harmed. Usopp contacts the freed Cipher Pol agents, who seek refuge from the Seraphim. S-Snake reverses the petrification of the Straw Hats due to her affection for Luffy. The crew plans to escape using Vegaforce-01 and the Thousand Sunny's Coup de Burst to bypass the Marines and head to Elbaph, but they are trapped by the Frontier Dome, controlled by York's password. As Luffy's group reaches the Thousand Sunny, Kizaru arrives on Egghead and is intercepted by Sentomaru, while Luffy senses Kizaru's presence.
| 1125 | 37 | "A Clash of Two Men's Determination! Kizaru and Sentomaru"; Transliteration: "Butsukaru Otoko no Kakugo! Kizaru to Sentomaru" (Japanese: ぶつかる男の覚悟！黄猿と戦桃丸) | Yasushi Tomoda | Tomohiro Nakayama | Masayuki Takagi & Katsumi Ishizuka | April 13, 2025 | 3.1% |
The battle escalates as the Marines attack the Pacifistas, but the Sea Beast weapons retaliate, prompting Vice Admiral intervention. Dr. Vegapunk is puzzled by the assault, especially with Sentomaru present, and suspects that Kizaru was sent to eliminate him. Sentomaru and Kizaru clash, with Sentomaru bravely opposing the Admiral despite being outmatched, honoring his vow to protect Vegapunk. A flashback reveals their first meeting and how Sentomaru became Dr. Vegapunk's bodyguard. Kizaru defeats Sentomaru and takes control of the Pacifistas. Meanwhile, Vegapunk and his allies try to disable the Frontier Dome as Kizaru enters the Labophase. Lucci attempts to assassinate Vegapunk, but Stussy protects him. Zoro engages Lucci in combat, while Luffy confronts Kizaru, declaring that the Straw Hats are now far stronger than before.
| 1126 | 38 | "Looming Despair! Admiral Kizaru's Depressing Mission"; Transliteration: "Semaru Zetsubō! Taishō Kizaru no Yūutsuna Ninmu" (Japanese: 迫る絶望！大将黄猿の憂鬱な任務) | Hazuki Omoya | Atsuhiro Tomioka | Toshio Deguchi & Masahiro Kitazaki | April 20, 2025 | 2.8% |
Kuma arrives at Mary Geoise and unleashes a devastating Ursus Shock, prompting Sakazuki to confront him. Despite suffering severe damage at the hands of the Admiral, Kuma manages to teleport away. Sakazuki reflects on the time he captured Bonney and informed her that Kuma had willingly become a cyborg, a fact she refused to believe. Meanwhile, on Egghead, Luffy battles Kizaru in his Fourth Gear: Snakeman. Kizaru, unwilling to harm Vegapunk but bound by orders, launches Luffy into Vegaforce-01, destroying it. As chaos erupts, Bonney challenges Kizaru but is quickly overpowered. Kizaru advances toward Dr. Vegapunk, but just as he prepares to act, Luffy returns in his Fifth Gear as a giant and grabs him. Luffy's transformation awakens the dormant Iron Giant below.
| 1127 | 39 | "Luffy vs. Kizaru! A Fierce Kaleidoscopic Battle"; Transliteration: "Rufi bāsasu Kizaru! Hengen Jizai no Dai Gekisen" (Japanese: ルフィVS(バーサス)黄猿！変幻自在の大激戦) | Wataru Matsumi | Akiko Inoue | Yong-Ce Tu & Ziwei He | April 27, 2025 | 2.9% |
Luffy hurls Kizaru from the Control Tower, giving the crew a chance to escape. Atlas heads to the Fabiriophase to regain control of the Pacifista Mark III, while Vegapunk informs Franky that Bonney is alive and also there. Bonney uses her Age-Age Fruit powers to fight off and evade the Marines. Meanwhile, Zoro duels Lucci, and Luffy battles Kizaru, who creates light clones to distract him. Luffy counters with his Human-Human Fruit, Model: Nika powers, but Kizaru tricks him and returns to the Control Tower, capturing Usopp. Vegapunk, Atlas, and Sanji leave in the Vegatank-08 to rescue Bonney, with Kizaru in pursuit. Franky joins them, and the Marines are alerted that Vegapunk has left the Labophase. Atlas then commands the Pacifistas to attack the Marines.
| 1128 | 40 | "The Nightmare Strikes - Godhead of Science & Defense, St. Saturn"; Transliteration: "Akumu Shūrai - Kagaku Bōei Bushin Satān-sei" (Japanese: 悪夢襲来 科学防衛武神サターン聖) | Nozomu Shishido | Shinzō Fujita | Shin Kashiwaguma | May 4, 2025 | 3.2% |
The Pacifistas attack the Marines as Dr. Vegapunk's group moves toward the Fabiriophase. Sanji finds Bonney, who's under assault by Vice Admiral Pomsky. Bonney uses her NDE technique to knock out the Marines but is cornered by Vice Admiral Bluegrass. Sanji rescues Bonney, and they return to the Vegatank-08. Meanwhile, Luffy's battle with Kizaru intensifies. St. Saturn arrives on Egghead, halting the Pacifistas and warning the Marines. He transforms into a demonic spider hybrid and kills a Marine who looks at him. As Sanji's group tries to retreat, Kizaru destroys their escape route, causing them to fall. Luffy hits Kizaru with a Gum-Gum Star Gun before returning to normal due to Fifth Gear's exhaustion. The Vegatank-08 crashes, but the crew survives. Saturn confronts Vegapunk, and Bonney, overcome with rage and grief, stabs Saturn.
| 1129 | 41 | "Kuma's Past - Better Off Dead in This World"; Transliteration: "Kuma no Kako - Shinda Hō ga ī Sekai" (Japanese: くまの過去 死んだ方がいい世界) | Tasuku Shimaya | Shōji Yonemura | Keita Saitō, Kimitaka Itō, Rina Fujii, Ririka Fukatani, Katsumi Ishizuka & Neru Takuyama | May 18, 2025 | 2.9% |
After Bonney attacks St. Saturn, the World Noble quickly heals and restrains her. He criticizes Kizaru for failing. Saturn then tries to eliminate Luffy, but Franky intervenes. Despite Vegapunk's betrayal, Saturn thanks him for his scientific contributions. Bonney confronts Saturn about Kuma's fate. Saturn reveals Kuma was born a slave and a member of the nearly extinct Buccaneer race, who committed a crime. Bonney recalls Kuma saying he wanted to be a hero like the Warrior of Liberation, the Sun God Nika. 47 years earlier in the Sorbet Kingdom, Kuma was born to a Buccaneer father, Clapp, and a human mother. After their heritage was exposed, they were enslaved by the World Nobles. Kuma endured brutal conditions; his mother died, and Clapp was killed while encouraging Kuma to believe in Nika. Years later, the World Nobles hosted a genocidal tournament on God Valley. When Kuma attempted to escape, a young Ivankov and Ginny arrived and urged him to survive.
| 1130 | 42 | "A History Erased! God Valley of Despair"; Transliteration: "Kesa-reta Rekishi! Zetsubō no Goddo Barē" (Japanese: 消された歴史！絶望のゴッドバレー) | Eri Hyun | Jin Tanaka | Kazuya Hisada | May 25, 2025 | 2.7% |
The World Nobles initiate their hunting competition on God Valley. Ginny reveals that two Devil Fruits — the Fish-Fish Fruit, Model: Azure Dragon, and the Paw-Paw Fruit — are present on the island and are essential to their escape. She discloses that she leaked information about God Valley and its hidden treasure to the public, prompting both the Rocks Pirates and the Roger Pirates to arrive on the island to raid it. Ivankov and Kuma secure the Devil Fruits, but Charlotte Linlin attacks and seizes the Fish-Fish Fruit. Kuma consumes the Paw-Paw Fruit and confronts Saturn, defying the oppressive regime that had enslaved his people. Kuma, Ivankov, and Ginny return to the Sorbet Kingdom after Kuma helped 500 people escape god Valley. Ivankov eventually departs, while Kuma and Ginny begin a new life of freedom.
| 1131 | 43 | "A Fleeting Moment of Happiness - Kumachi and Ginny"; Transliteration: "Hitotoki no Shiawase - Kumachī to Jinī" (Japanese: ひとときの幸せ くまちーとジニー) | Katsumi Tokoro | Tomohiro Nakayama | Masahiro Kitazaki | June 1, 2025 | 2.9% |
Eight years after the God Valley Incident, Kuma lives peacefully in the Sorbet Kingdom, using his Devil Fruit powers to help others. Ginny strictly manages his efforts so that his kindness won't be exploited. The kingdom suffers under the tyrant King Bekori, who prioritizes the Heavenly Tribute over the people's welfare, enslaving the financially struggling residents. Kuma secretly absorbs others' pain as it would eventually return to its source if not, harming himself. Despite Ginny's love and proposal, he refuses her, fearing for her safety due to his Buccaneer heritage. Inspired by Dragon and the Freedom Fighters, Kuma dreams of helping others on a larger scale. After opposing Bekori's regime, Kuma and Ginny are imprisoned. The Freedom Fighters overthrow the king and liberate the kingdom. Kuma joins Dragon and Ivankov and form the Revolutionary Army. Years later, Ginny, now a captain, is captured by an unknown enemy.
| 1132 | 44 | "A Pledge to Ginny - Kuma Becomes a Father"; Transliteration: "Jinī e no Chikai - Chichi to Natta Kuma" (Japanese: ジニーへの誓い 父となったくま) | Shō Inuzuka | Ryo Yamazaki | Shigefumi Shingaki & Shūichi Itō | June 8, 2025 | N/A |
Two years after Ginny was kidnapped and forced to marry a World Noble, she contacts the Revolutionary Army to say her final farewell, informing them of her illness and impending death. Kuma rushes to her side, but she passes away before he arrives. Upon his arrival, Kuma discovers that Ginny had a daughter, Bonney, and he vows to raise her as his own. Kuma leaves the Revolutionary Army to care for Bonney after she inherits Ginny's terminal illness, known as Sapphire Scales. Kuma learns that Bonney will not survive past the age of ten. Bonney mistakenly believes she will be cured in time. Heartbroken, Kuma is unable to tell her the truth. A year later, unrest arises once again as Bekori returns and threatens the Sorbet Kingdom.
| 1133 | 45 | "To Save His Daughter - Kuma the Timid Pacifist"; Transliteration: "Bonī o Sukue - Kiyowana "Pashifisuta" Kuma" (Japanese: 娘(ボニー)を救え 気弱な〝平和主義者(パシフィスタ)〟くま) | Toshinori Fukuzawa | Atsuhiro Tomioka | Eisaku Inoue | June 15, 2025 | 2.7% |
When Bekori causes chaos in the Sorbet Kingdom, Kuma violently confronts the tyrant king, leading to the event being dubbed the Solo Revolution. Though Kuma is crowned king, Bulldog, a former king, assumes leadership. Kuma discovers that Bonney has consumed the Age-Age Fruit, allowing her to alter her appearance. Bekori spreads false propaganda to regain power with the World Government's support. Kuma defeats Bekori again and earns a bounty, forcing him to leave Sorbet. Kuma travels the world searching for a cure for Bonney, crossing paths with the Revolutionary Army and reconnecting with Dragon. Kuma meets Dr. Vegapunk, who offers an experimental stem cell treatment for Bonney in exchange for using Kuma as a model for powerful clone soldiers. Kuma agrees, prioritizing Bonney's life, with the soldiers being named the Pacifista.
| 1134 | 46 | "Cruel Fate - Kuma's Decision as a Father"; Transliteration: "Hijō-naru Unmei - Chichi Kuma no Ketsudan" (Japanese: 非情なる運命 父くまの決断) | Hazuki Omoya | Akiko Inoue | Masayuki Takagi & Toshio Deguchi | June 29, 2025 | 2.8% |
At Dr. Vegapunk's lab, Saturn contacts Vegapunk and rejects Kuma as the face of the clone army. He imposes harsh conditions: Kuma must become a Warlord, a cyborg weapon, and surrender his free will. Vegapunk objects, but Kuma agrees, sacrificing himself to ensure Bonney receives life-saving treatment. Saturn demands Bonney be placed under government surveillance, cutting her off from Kuma. Kuma requests she be treated in the Sorbet Kingdom and kept unaware of the truth. Over six months, her treatment succeeds, and she's expected to be fully cured in a year. She and Kuma return to the Sorbet Kingdom, but he leaves after Alpha, a CP8 agent, is assigned to monitor her. News of Kuma's obedience as a Warlord confuses the Revolutionary Army. Kuma begins writing letters to Bonney as he heads to Foosha Village, awaiting his next orders.
| 1135 | 47 | "To the Sea Where My Father Is! The Future Bonney Chooses"; Transliteration: "Chichi no Iru Umi e! Bonī ga Erabu Mirai" (Japanese: 父のいる海へ！ボニーが選ぶ未来) | Directed by : Shō Matsui & Wataru Matsumi; Storyboarded by : Shō Matsui | Shinzō Fujita | Kenji Yokoyama | July 6, 2025 | 3.7% |
In the East Blue, Kuma watches Luffy train, reminiscing about a past conversation with Dragon. He realizes that Luffy is Dragon's son. While out at sea, Kuma writes heartfelt letters to Bonney, though they are intercepted and destroyed by Alpha. When Bonney's tenth birthday approaches, she is finally cured of the Sapphire Scales. However, Alpha refuses to let her go, prompting Conney to become suspicious of her. Conney learns that Alpha is a government agent and devises a plan to help Bonney escape and go see Kuma. Disguised as Conney, Bonney manages to flee, using her Distorted Future attack to defeat Alpha and set sail with a new crew. Word spreads of her escape, marking the beginning of her rise as an infamous pirate in the new era.
| 1136 | 48 | "Kuma's Life"; Transliteration: "Kuma no Jinsei" (Japanese: くまの人生) | Yasunori Koyama | Shōji Yonemura | Hiroto Saitō, Kimitaka Itō & Masayuki Satō | July 13, 2025 | 2.7% |
Two years before the present, the Bonney Pirates arrive on an island in search of Kuma, who is secretly on the same island but avoids contact to protect Bonney. She declares her intent to find both Kuma and Nika, hoping to gain her father's attention. Meanwhile, Luffy's rising fame prompts reactions from Dragon, Ace, Jinbe, and Kuma, who notes that both his and Dragon's children became pirates. On the Sabaody Archipelago, after Luffy punched a Celestial Dragon, Kuma separated the Straws Hats in order to both save them and show them the level of adversity they would face in the New World. On Egghead, Vegapunk is ordered by Saturn to install a self-destruct mechanism in Kuma and erase his free will, despite Vegapunk's protests. Kuma agrees to have his memories extracted and asks to protect the Thousand Sunny until the Straw Hats return to Sabaody, believing Luffy will change the world. He reflects on his life, receives kind words from Vegapunk, and expresses gratitude for Bonney's safety. In the present, Bonney sees Kuma's memories and breaks down after witnessing his sacrifices.
| 1137 | 49 | "I'm Sorry, Dad - Bonney's Tears and Kuma's Fist"; Transliteration: "Gomen ne, Otōsan - Bonī no Namida to Kuma no Koboshi" (Japanese: ごめんね、お父さん ボニーの涙とくまの拳) | Wataru Matsumi | Jin Tanaka | Yong-Ce Tu & Ziwei He | July 27, 2025 | 2.7% |
After viewing Kuma's memories, Bonney reconciles with Vegapunk, who gives her a sapphire necklace meant for her 10th birthday from Kuma. Now knowing the truth, Bonney understands that Saturn, not Vegapunk, is to blame for Kuma's fate. In the present, Saturn coldly claims Kuma is dead, while Bonney tries to attack him with Distortion Future but fails. Saturn reveals he gave Bonney her Age-Age Fruit powers through an experiment as a baby, which weakens when her perception of the future falters. He dismisses Nika as a myth and admits to infecting Ginny with the Sapphire Scales, which Bonney inherited. As Bonney despairs, Kuma arrives on Egghead and protects her from Saturn's attacks. Shocked by Kuma's survival, Saturn reveals he had activated Kuma's self-destruct mechanism. Kuma employs Armament Haki and delivers a powerful punch to Saturn.
| 1138 | 50 | "Thank You, Dad - Bonney and Kuma's Warm Embrace"; Transliteration: "Arigatō, Otōsan - Bonī to Kuma no Atsuki Hōyō" (Japanese: ありがとう、お父さん ボニーとくまの熱き抱擁) | Directed by : Tomohiro Higashi; Storyboarded by : Katsumi Tokoro | Tomohiro Nakayama | Masahiro Kitazaki | August 3, 2025 | 2.6% |
Kuma punches Saturn, sending him crashing through buildings. This allows Sanji and Franky to move freely and tend to Bonney. Vegapunk reveals that Kuma's self-destruct mechanism was intended to shut him down, not kill him, and speculates that Kuma's actions—driven by love and a unique Buccaneer power—enabled him to defy his programming and save Bonney. Bonney tearfully thanks Kuma for his sacrifices and love, calling him her kind father regardless of his reputation. Saturn, enraged and regenerating his injuries, attempts to attack again but is countered by Sanji and Franky. Kizaru intervenes and strikes Franky. With Kuma in a vegetative state, Atlas carries him, while Vegapunk criticizes Kizaru for his lack of empathy. Saturn orders a Buster Call to destroy Egghead.
| 1139 | 51 | "Destroy Egghead - The Buster Call Is Invoked"; Transliteration: "Egguheddo o Hakai Seyo - Basutā Kōru Hatsudō" (Japanese: 未来島(エッグヘッド)を破壊せよ バスターコール発動) | Yusuke Suzuki | Ryo Yamazaki | Kazuya Hisada | August 10, 2025 | 2.6% |
The Marines evacuate Egghead ahead of the Buster Call, but Saturn and Kizaru remain to ensure the island's destruction. Vegapunk pleads with them to stop, warning that the loss would set humanity back a century, but Saturn refuses, citing the need to erase all knowledge of the Void Century and revealing that he ordered the researchers' ship destroyed. Meanwhile, Nami informs Sanji of the situation, especially now that the Vegaforce-01 has been destroyed. The Buster Call begins, devastating the island, and Kizaru sabotages the Vacuum Rocket, scattering Franky's group. Saturn orders the Pacifistas to execute Kuma and Bonney. Unbeknownst to Saturn, the Marine ship tasked with eliminating the researchers is destroyed, and a surviving Marine reports an unknown group heading towards Egghead.
| 1140 | 52 | "An Admired Hero - The Warrior of Liberation Who Saves Bonney"; Transliteration: "Akogare no Hīrō - Bonī o Sukuu Kaihō no Senshi" (Japanese: 憧れのヒーロー ボニーを救う解放の戦士) | Yasuhiro Tanabe | Atsuhiro Tomioka | Nobuyuki Iwai & Keita Saitō | August 17, 2025 | 2.3% |
After his meal, Luffy transforms into Fifth Gear to evade the Marines. Vegapunk contacts Atlas to relay a message to Bonney, who commands the Pacifistas to protect the Straw Hats and aid their escape, defying both the Marines and Saturn. Vegapunk, having feared that Bonney would be killed by a weapon bearing her father's likeness, secretly programed the Pacifistas to grant Bonney authority over them, surpassing even the Five Elders. Enraged, Saturn impales Vegapunk and orders Kizaru to kill everyone. Kizaru attacks, but Luffy intervenes and punches him away. Elsewhere, the Iron Giant awakens. At Vegapunk's side, Bonney notices Luffy's heartbeat matches a tune Kuma taught her, and Vegapunk believes Luffy is the Sun God Nika, much to Bonney's big shock. As the Marines falter, Dorry and Brogy arrive on a massive ship from Elbaph to assist the Straw Hats, hailing Luffy as the Sun God Nika.
| 1141 | 53 | "Reliable Reinforcements! Dorry and Brogy Arrive!"; Transliteration: "Tanomoshiki Engun! Dorī to Burogī Tōchaku!" (Japanese: 頼もしき援軍！ドリーとブロギー到着！) | Eri Hyun | Akiko Inoue | Shigefumi Shingaki, Shūichi Itō & Zhi Guang Liu | August 24, 2025 | 2.7% |
Dorry and Brogy arrive on Egghead, ordering Oimo and Kashii to flank the Marines. Zoro battles Lucci, refusing to be manipulated into surrendering. The Marines falter as their ships are destroyed, forcing Vice Admiral Red King to change tactics. Bonney tearfully tells Luffy she has been searching those years for him, calls him Nika and asks him to teach her to fight, leaving him confused for being called Nika. Luffy strikes Saturn with a Gum-Gum Dawn Gatling, while Sanji deflects Kizaru's laser. Luffy and Sanji stay behind as the crew advances. Saturn then encounters Van Augur and Catarina Devon of the Blackbeard Pirates, who reveal their allegiance and hint at Blackbeard's ambitions. Saturn questions their motives before attacking, but they escape with Augur's warping ability. Soon after, they meet Caribou, who begs to join Blackbeard's crew.
| 1142 | 54 | "Come In, World - Vegapunk's Message"; Transliteration: "Ōtō Seyo, Sekai - Begapanku no Messēji" (Japanese: 応答せよ、世界 ベガパンクのメッセージ) | Directed by : Atsuo Yamai; Storyboarded by : Miho Hirayama | Shinzō Fujita | Eisaku Inoue | September 7, 2025 | 2.8% |
Augur holds Caribou at gunpoint as Caribou begs for his life, offering Blackbeard information about Poseidon and Pluton to prove his worth. The Marines struggle to break through the Pacifistas' shields, debating whether to halt the Buster Call but deciding instead to kill Bonney to regain control of the Pacifistas. Vice Admiral Tosa attempts to kill her but is defeated by Brogy, who arrives with Dorry and the other Elbaph giants to aid the Straw Hats. Vegapunk refuses to leave the island, entrusting Bonney's safety to the crew. Sanji carries him, but Kizaru mortally kills Vegapunk before Luffy intervenes, enlarging his body to restrain both Kizaru and Saturn. Back in the lab, a video of Vegapunk begins broadcasting a message to reveal the truth to the world.
| 1143 | 55 | "Vegapunk's Secret Plan - A Tense Worldwide Broadcast"; Transliteration: "Begapanku no Hisaku - Kinpaku no Zen Sekai Haishin" (Japanese: ベガパンクの秘策 緊迫の全世界配信) | Hazuki Omoya | Shōji Yonemura | Toshio Deguchi & Yuki Yoshida | September 14, 2025 | 2.3% |
In the broadcast video, Shaka questions Dr. Vegapunk about relaying his message worldwide, worrying about censorship and timing. Vegapunk initially considers giving people an hour but shortens it to ten minutes after Shaka warns enemies could cut the feed. To ensure success, Vegapunk hijacks the Marines' comms for an unstoppable global broadcast, which the Marines fail to shut down. Around the world, allies, civilians, and even the Revolutionary Army tune in. Meanwhile, the Elders suspect the broadcast is a dead man's switch and try locating its source in the Labophase. On Egghead, Luffy battles Kizaru and Saturn, flattening them with his new Gum-Gum Dawn Cymbal attack, though Saturn recovers. Realizing Vegapunk must be silenced, Saturn finally summons the other four Elders.
| 1144 | 56 | "The Worst Nightmare - The Five Elders Come Together"; Transliteration: "Saikyō no Akumu - "Gorōsei" Shūketsu" (Japanese: 最凶の悪夢 ｢五老星｣集結) | Toshinori Fukuzawa | Jin Tanaka | Shin Kashiwaguma, Katsumi Ishizuka & Yong-Ce Tu | September 21, 2025 | 2.6% |
The Five Elders arrive on Egghead, alarming everyone as Vegapunk prepares his broadcast. He reveals that it cannot be stopped, even if disrupted. The Elders' Mythical Zoan Devil Fruits forms are unveiled: Saturn as a gyūki, Marcus Mars as a itsumade, Topman Warcury as a fengxi, Ethanbaron V. Nusjuro as a bakotsu, and Shepherd Ju Peter as a sandworm. Nusjuro immobilizes half the Pacifista, while Mars attacks the Frontier Dome. Sanji urges the crew to escape, but Zoro remains locked in battle with Lucci. Upon hearing Sanji insult him, Zoro unleashes a Three Sword Style technique to defeat him. Meanwhile, Luffy clashes with Saturn, Warcury, and Ju Peter, the latter of whom swallows him whole. Just then, Dorry and Brogy appear, slay Ju Peter, and free Luffy, declaring they came to fetch him after growing tired of waiting on Elbaph.
| 1145 | 57 | "Friends Fight Together! Luffy and the Warriors of Elbaph"; Transliteration: "Dachi to no Kyōtō! Rufi to Erubafu no Senshi" (Japanese: 友達(ダチ)との共闘！ルフィとエルバフの戦士) | Kenichi Takeshita | Tomohiro Nakayama | Masayuki Takagi | September 28, 2025 | 2.6% |
Mars, in his Mythical Zoan Devil Fruit form, breaches the Frontier Dome, terrifying Jinbe with his Haki. Jinbe urges Zoro to retreat, but Zoro refuses. Jinbe drags him away, using a dust cloud to escape. Lucci reverts to his human form and reveals York's location, the Straw Hats' escape plan, and the captive agents, warning Mars of Vegapunk's imminent broadcast. Mars thanks him but dismisses the idea of sparing Kaku. Meanwhile, Luffy reunites with the Giant Warrior Pirates, who aid him against Warcury's devastating Haki. With Brogy and Dorry's help, they repel the Elders' attacks and escape, though the Elders regenerate. Elsewhere, Bonney's group faces the Vice Admirals while Mars confronts York. The Marines witness the Iron Giant emerging from the flames, muttering an apology to Joy Boy.
| 1146 | 58 | "An Imminent Threat - Stussy and Edison's Resolve"; Transliteration: "Osoi-kuru Kyōi - Sutyūshī to "Ejison" no Ketsui" (Japanese: 襲い来る脅威 ステューシーと｢想(エジソン)｣の決意) | Shō Inuzuka | Ryo Yamazaki | Kenji Yokoyama | October 19, 2025 | 2.8% |
The Marines regain control after disabling the Pacifistas and move to stop Luffy and Bonney's escape. Nusjuro rages over Vegapunk's defiance, while the giants attempt to retreat before the Marines can target their ship. Franky defeats Red King as Bonney transforms Pomsky into a child and kicks him away. On the Labophase, Mars destroys the broadcast room but fails to stop Vegapunk's telecast. York assists him in locating the hidden Transponder Snail, which he senses inside Punk Records. Meanwhile, Stussy stays behind to deactivate the Frontier Dome and Edison decides to fly through the dome barrier to allow the Straw Hats to escape. Luffy fends off Ju Peter but reverts to his normal form. After eating hákarl, he regains his strength and attacks Warcury, only to recoil in pain. Saturn confronts Nami's group as Mars discovers the Transponder Snail moments before the broadcast begins.
| 1147 | 59 | "A Stunning Conclusion - Vegapunk's Great Prediction"; Transliteration: "Kyōgaku no Ketsuron - Begapanku no Dai Yogen" (Japanese: 驚愕の結論 ベガパンクの大予言) | Katsumi Tokoro | Atsuhiro Tomioka | Masahiro Kitazaki | October 26, 2025 | 3.1% |
Mars furiously discovers he is tricked by a decoy Transponder Snail and fails to stop Vegapunk's broadcast, which reaches people worldwide. He warns the other Elders there is no way to halt it, and that Vegapunk intends to continue Ohara's mission. At the shore, Sanji rescues Bonney from Nusjuro, landing a powerful blow before Oimo and Kashii restrain the Elder as Bonney uses her Distorted Future to grow into a giant. Vegapunk reveals he committed two great sins and set the broadcast to play upon his death, urging the world not to judge his killer. On the Labophase, Saturn attacks the Straw Hats while demanding control of the broadcast. Mars considers destroying the lab, but is stopped, as Vegapunk finally warns the world will soon sink into the Blue Sea.
| 1148 | 60 | "The Lost History - Joy Boy, the First Pirate"; Transliteration: "Maboroshi no Rekishi - Hajimari no Kaizoku Joi Bōi" (Japanese: 幻の歴史 はじまりの海賊ジョイボーイ) | Yusuke Suzuki | Akiko Inoue | Kazuya Hisada | November 2, 2025 | 2.8% |
Vegapunk's warning that the world will sink sparks disbelief around the globe. Some fear his words will trigger widespread chaos, while the Five Elders, growing desperate, decide to wipe out everything on Egghead. Vegapunk predicts a massive earthquake followed by a one-meter sea-level rise that will submerge several islands, insisting the phenomenon is not natural. As Saturn rushes toward the Mother Flame, Vegapunk admits his first "sin" was creating the Mother Flame, an unlimited energy source. His second was researching the Poneglyphs using Ohara's documents to study the Void Century. Meanwhile, chaos engulfs Egghead as Luffy battles Warcury and the Straw Hats attempt to escape. Vegapunk also reveals that Joy Boy, a rubber-bodied man similar to Nika, was the world's first-ever pirate. Vegapunk explains that the Poneglyphs describe an ancient war between Joy Boy and the twenty kingdoms that became the World Government. Mars tries to halt the broadcast with his Haki, but it continues. Vegapunk says the conflict was ideological, tied to the advanced kingdom Joy Boy came from, whose weapons surpass modern science. Meanwhile, a heavily injured Edison extends the Labophase's island clouds to allow the Straw Hats to escape.
| 1149 | 61 | "The Void Century - A Revelation About a Sinking World"; Transliteration: "Kūhaku no Hyaku-nen - Sekai Chinbotsu no Shinjitsu" (Japanese: 空白の100(ひゃく)年 世界沈没の真実) | Shō Matsui | Shinzō Fujita | Hiroto Saitō & Yuki Yoshida | November 9, 2025 | 3.4% |
As chaos erupts on Egghead, Stussy is contacted by Edison, who instructs her to lower the Frontier Dom, while the former feels lost on what to do with her life now that Vegapunk is dead. Edison tells her to run away and live though she wants to free Kaku first despite knowing that he'll most likely kill her for her betrayal. At the coast, Franky save Bonney from a fatal attack from Nusjuro before she reverts back to her normal form. Nusjuro then heads to the sky and unleashes devastating attacks that cuts the Labophase in two causing the imrpisoned Cipher Pol agents and Seraphim to fall to the center of the island. Vegapunk reveals that 1,000 years there were continents, but during the Void Century, a man-made cataclysm sank the ancient world, raising sea levels by 200 meters, caused by the Ancient Weapons. He admits a stolen fragment of the Mother Flame powered Lulusia's destruction, proving the danger. Vegapunk warns the ancient war never truly ended and hints the Roger Pirates know the truth. York finally realizes the Iron Giant is guarding the true Transponder Snail.
| 1150 | 62 | "Get the Ship Moving! The Iron Giant Activates"; Transliteration: "Fune o Dase! "Tetsu no Kyojin" Shidō" (Japanese: 船を出せ！〝鉄の巨人〟始動) | Directed by : Tomohiro Higashi; Storyboarded by : Miho Hirayama | Shōji Yonemura | Eisaku Inoue, Keita Saitō & Kimitaka Itō | November 16, 2025 | 2.8% |
As the Five Elders shift their focus to the Iron Giant, Vegapunk warns that anything further would be speculation, yet he continues anyway, heightening curiosity about what Roger truly left behind. On Egghead, the Straw Hats prepare for launch while Jinbe intercepts Nusjuro, giving Zoro the chance to clash with him with both being shocked that the other weilds a Kitetsu sword. Meanwhile, Marines surround the giants' ship and unleash heavy attacks. Warcury abandons his pursuit to join the other Elders in confronting the Iron Giant. Vegapunk announces he has one final message and begins addressing those who bear "D". in their names. Before he can reveal its true meaning, Warcury tackles the Iron Giant into the ocean, abruptly ending Vegapunk's broadcast. As the Iron Giant sinks, it wonders where Joy Boy really is.
| 1151 | 63 | "Her and Her Father's Dream! Bonney's Free Future"; Transliteration: "Chichi to Egaita Yume! Bonī no Jiyūna Mirai" (Japanese: 父と描いた夢！ボニーの自由な未来) | Directed by : Eri Hyun; Storyboarded by : Aya Komaki & Eri Hyun | Jin Tanaka | Masahiro Shimanuki & Zhi Guang Liu | November 30, 2025 | 2.8% |
Vegapunk's interrupted broadcast sparks global confusion over his death, with some blaming the World Government and others accusing Luffy due to false allegations that he was holding Vegapunk hostage. On Egghead, the Five Elders discover that only Lilith and Atlas remain connected to Punk Records and move to eliminate them. Kaku allows Stussy to escape. The giants set sail alongside Luffy, Dorry, and Brogy, while Bonney transforms several Marines into children. Mars attacks the ship, but Luffy enters Fifth Gear and inspires Bonney to awaken her own Nika-like form. With Sanji's, Franky's and Bonney's help, Luffy then sends Mars flying with a Gum-Gum Dawn Balloon. Meanwhile, Vegapunk's broadcast resumes, prompting York to insist that the broadcast Transponder Snail must be destroyed. Atlas heads to the Labophase to check on the others. As Ju Peter attacks (inavertaly sending the Cipher Pol agents and Seraphim to the Marine ships) and Warcury charges forward, but Emet, the Iron Giant, rises from the sea and stops him.
| 1152 | 64 | "Her Father and Mother's Legacy! Bonney's Nika Punch"; Transliteration: "Chichi to Haha no Omoi! Bonī no Nika Panchi" (Japanese: 父と母の想い！ボニーの解放の拳(ニカパンチ)) | Nozomu Shishido | Tomohiro Nakayama | Yong-Ce Tu & Ziwei He | December 7, 2025 | 2.8% |
A flashback occurs 26 years ago, where Vegapunk learned Clover's true identity as a bearer of "D" and after the latter's death, took over his research. In the present, Atlas sacrifices herself so the Sunny can escape to sea but not before knocking out Lilith so York cannot track her. As the broadcast reveals finding the One Piece is tied to learning the true history which the Roger Pirates had learned, Peter attacks Emet and Saturn attacks the Giant ship, but is stopped by Luffy and Bonney.
| 1153 | 65 | "The Upheaval of an Era! The Color of the Supreme King That Leads Luffy"; Transliteration: "Jidai no Uneri! Rufi o Michibiku Haōshoku" (Japanese: 時代のうねり！ルフィを導く覇王色) | Hazuki Omoya | Ryo Yamazaki | Toshio Deguchi & Runze Wang | December 14, 2025 | 2.8% |
As Vegapunk reveals of how the fate of the world is tied to the pirates, causing reactions among the public and Marines, the next attack permanently destroys the Transponder Snail, ending the transmission for good. After Emet asks Luffy his name, he uses a large amount of Joy Boy's Conqueror's Haki to save Luffy and his allies. This knocks out all the Marines, dispels the Five Elders's transformation and sends them minus Saturn back to Pangaea Castle.
| 1154 | 66 | "The Truth Behind the Secret Plan - Vegapunk Claims Victory"; Transliteration: "Hisaku no Shinsō - Begapanku no Shōri Sengen" (Japanese: 秘策の真相 ベガパンクの勝利宣言) | Satoshi Itō | Atsuhiro Tomioka | Masahiro Kitazaki & Shigefumi Shingaki | December 21, 2025 | 2.4% |
With all the Marines knocked out, the Straw Hat Pirates and Giant Warrior Pirates depart Egghead. Sakazuki manages to contact Kizaru but when he accuses Kizaru of doing a sloppy job the admiral hits back that over the fact he had killed his best friend. As the Marines and Morgans deal with the aftermath of the Egghead incident, it is revealed that Vegapunk knew about York's betrayal two weeks ago. He then set up his plan to spread the truth upon his death prior to having his memories erased so York would not know about this.
| 1155 | 67 | "The Promised Horizon - Off to the Long-Awaited Elbaph!"; Transliteration: "Yakusoku no Suiheisen - Iza Nengan no Erubafu e!" (Japanese: 約束の水平線 いざ念願のエルバフへ！) | Directed by : Atsuo Yamai & Yasunori Koyama; Storyboarded by : Yasunori Koyama | Akiko Inoue | Shūichi Itō | December 28, 2025 | 2.6% |
As the giants' ship sets sail, Jinbe notes the unusual silence caused by Luffy's disappointment over failing to save Vegapunk. Back on Egghead, Lucci coldly claims Stussy was killed, while Saturn briefs the Vice Admirals, stating they obtained what was needed to pursue the remaining flames. He recalls that scientists failed to activate the Giant Robot 200 years ago, making Emet's revival all the more shocking. York awakens to discover Edison escaping with Punk Records. In Mary Geoise, the World Nobles panic over a looming food crisis as Figarland Garling is appointed the new Godhead of Science and Defense, joining the Elders. Suddenly, Saturn senses Imu's wrath for allowing "Joy Boy" (Luffy) to escape. Saturn tries to beg Imu for mercy and claims that the power of the Human-Human Fruit, Model: Nika was too unpredictable but Imu erases him, leaving only a skeleton before the stunned Vice Admirals. On Punk Records, it is revealed that surviving Vegapunk remnants have merged into a single being. It then called Weatheria. In Kamabakka Kingdom, Dragon and the Revolutionaries discuss the global impact of Vegapunk's message. Aboard the ship, Lilith reassures Luffy that Vegapunk still lives on through them, lifting his spirits. The crew prepares for a banquet as they sail to Elbaph, Bonney finds her father smiling at her side and Luffy boldly declares his dream of becoming the King of the Pirates, unaware he is already being watched from Elbaph's shores.

== Specials ==
Note: All specials featured on this list are recap specials with the exception of "One Piece Fan Letter", which serves as a 25th anniversary special that is officially unnumbered for the TV series.

| No. overall | No. in season | Title | Directed by | Written by | Animation directed by | Original release date | Viewership rating |
|---|---|---|---|---|---|---|---|
| 1092.5 | SP–1 | "A Project to Fully Enjoy! "Surgeon of Death" Trafalgar Law"; Transliteration: "Dai Tan'nō Kikaku! "Shi no Gekai" Torafarugā Rō" (Japanese: 大堪能企画！〝死の外科医〟トラファルガー・ロー) | N/A | N/A | N/A | February 4, 2024 | 3.1% |
A recap special covering the character Trafalgar Law
| 1100.5 | SP–2 | "The Log of the Rivalry! The Straw Hats vs. Cipher Pol"; Transliteration: "In'nen no Rogu! Mugiwara no Ichimi to Saifā Pōru" (Japanese: 因縁の記録(ログ)！麦わらの一味とCP(サイファーポール)) | N/A | N/A | N/A | April 14, 2024 | 2.7% |
A recap special covering the history between the Straw Hats and CP9
| 1108.5 | SP–3 | "Making History! The Turbulent Old and New Four Emperors!"; Transliteration: "Kizama Reru Rekishi! Gekidō no Shinkyū Yonkō!" (Japanese: 刻まれる歴史！激動の新旧四皇！) | N/A | N/A | N/A | June 16, 2024 | 2.9% |
A recap special covering the former and current Four Emperors
| 1116.5 | SP–4 | "The Log of the Turbulent Revolution! The Revolutionary Army Manoeuvres in Secret!"; Transliteration: "Araburu Henkaku no Rogu! An'yaku Suru Kakumei-gun!" (Japanese: 荒ぶる変革の記録(ログ)！暗躍する革命軍！) | N/A | N/A | N/A | August 25, 2024 | 2.8% |
A recap special covering the Revolutionary Army
| 1120.5 | SP–5 | "Unwavering Justice! The Navy's Proud Log!"; Transliteration: "Yuruganu Seigi! Kaigun no Hokori Takaki Rogu!" (Japanese: 揺るがぬ正義！海軍の誇り高き記録(ログ)！) | N/A | N/A | N/A | September 29, 2024 | 2.5% |
A recap special covering the Marines
| SP | SP–6 | "One Piece Fan Letter" | Megumi Ishitani | Momoka Toyoda | Keisuke Mori | October 20, 2024 | 2.7% |
A young girl with strong admiration for Nami sets out on a small adventure from the Sabaody Archipelago, two years after the Summit War of Marineford. Luffy's, Zoro's, and Franky's stories are featured in this 25th anniversary special.
| 1122.5 | SP–7 | "Egghead Sosyuhen Special"; Transliteration: "Egguheddo-hen Furikaeri" (Japanese: エッグヘッド編ふりかえり) | N/A | N/A | N/A | April 5, 2025 | 3.9% |
An 80-minute recap special covering the first half of the "Egghead" story arc
| 1128.5 | SP–8 | "Dr. Chopper's Adventure Checkup: The Ballad of a Father and Daughter"; Transliteration: "Dokutā Choppā no Bōken Karute: Chichi to Musume no Barado" (Japanese: Dr.(ドクター)チョッパーの冒険カルテ ～父と娘の譚詩曲～) | N/A | N/A | N/A | May 11, 2025 | 3.4% |
A recap special covering Bartholomew Kuma and Jewelry Bonney
| 1133.5 | SP–9 | "Dr. Chopper's Adventure Checkup: Good Friends at a Crossroad"; Transliteration: "Dokutā Choppā no Bōken Karute: Shinyu-tachi no Kurosurōdo" (Japanese: Dr.(ドクター)チョッパーの冒険カルテ ～親友達の人生航路(クロスロード)～) | N/A | N/A | N/A | June 22, 2025 | 2.4% |
A recap special covering Kizaru, Sentomaru, and Dr. Vegapunk
| 1141.5 | SP–10 | "Dr. Chopper's Adventure Checkup: The Proud Dream of the Giants"; Transliteration: "Dokutā Choppā no Bōken Karute: Hokori Takaki Giganto Dorīmu" (Japanese: Dr.(ドクター)チョッパーの冒険カルテ ～誇り高き巨人の夢(ギガントドリーム)～) | N/A | N/A | N/A | August 31, 2025 | 2.4% |
A recap special covering giants
| 1145.5 | SP–11 | "Dr. Chopper's Adventure Checkup: Traitors' Masquerade"; Transliteration: "Dokutā Choppā no Bōken Karute: Uragirimono-tachi no Masukarēdo" (Japanese: Dr.(ドクター)チョッパーの冒険カルテ ～裏切り者達の仮面武闘会(マスカレード)～) | N/A | N/A | N/A | October 12, 2025 | 2.7% |
A recap special covering Rob Lucci and Cipher Pol "Aigis" Zero
| 1150.5 | SP–12 | "Dr. Chopper's Adventure Checkup: The Last Records That a Genius Left Behind"; Transliteration: "Dokutā Choppā no Bōken Karute: Tensai ga Nokoshita "Rasuto Rekōzu"" (Japanese: Dr.(ドクター)チョッパーの冒険カルテ ～天才が遺した〝最後の世界配信(ラストレコーズ)〟～) | N/A | N/A | N/A | November 23, 2025 | 2.9% |
A recap special covering Dr. Vegapunk's broadcast and final message to the world

== Home media release ==
=== Japanese ===
Avex Pictures (Japan – Region 2/A)
| Volume | | Episodes | Release date | Ref. |
|---|---|---|---|---|
| 21st Season Egghead-hen | piece.1 | 1089–1091 | August 7, 2024 | |
| 21st Season Egghead-hen | piece.2 | 1092–1093 + SP–1 | September 4, 2024 | |
| 21st Season Egghead-hen | piece.3 | 1094–1096 | October 2, 2024 | |
| 21st Season Egghead-hen | piece.4 | 1097–1099 | November 6, 2024 | |
| 21st Season Egghead-hen | piece.5 | 1100–1101 + SP–2 | December 4, 2024 | |
| 21st Season Egghead-hen | piece.6 | 1102–1104 | January 8, 2025 | |
| 21st Season Egghead-hen | piece.7 | 1105–1107 | February 5, 2025 | |
| 21st Season Egghead-hen | piece.8 | 1108–1109 + SP–3 | March 5, 2025 | |
| 21st Season Egghead-hen | piece.9 | 1110–1112 | April 2, 2025 | |
| 21st Season Egghead-hen | piece.10 | 1113–1115 | May 7, 2025 | |
| 21st Season Egghead-hen | piece.11 | 1116–1117 + SP–4 | June 4, 2025 | |
| 21st Season Egghead-hen | piece.12 | 1118–1120 | July 2, 2025 | |
| 21st Season Egghead-hen | piece.13 | 1121–1122 + SP–5 | August 6, 2025 | |
| 21st Season Egghead-hen | piece.14 | 1123–1125 | September 3, 2025 | |
| 21st Season Egghead-hen | piece.15 | 1126–1128 | October 1, 2025 | |
| 21st Season Egghead-hen | piece.16 | 1129–1130 + SP–8 | November 3, 2025 | |
| 21st Season Egghead-hen | piece.17 | 1131–1133 | December 3, 2025 | |
| 21st Season Egghead-hen | piece.18 | 1134–1135 + SP-9 | January 7, 2026 | |
| 21st Season Egghead-hen | piece.19 | 1136–1138 | February 4, 2026 | |
| 21st Season Egghead-hen | piece.20 | 1139–1141 | March 4, 2026 | |
| 21st Season Egghead-hen | piece.21 | 1142–1143 + SP–10 | April 1, 2026 | |
| 21st Season Egghead-hen | piece.22 | 1144–1145 + SP–11 | May 13, 2026 | |
| 21st Season Egghead-hen | piece.23 | 1146–1148 | June 3, 2026 | |
| 21st Season Egghead-hen | piece.24 | 1149–1150 + SP–12 | July 1, 2026 | |
| 21st Season Egghead-hen | piece.25 | 1151–1155 | August 5, 2026 | |
| One Piece Log Collection | "EGGHEAD" | 1089–1100 | June 24, 2026 | |
| One Piece Log Collection | "STUSSY" | 1101–1112 | July 29, 2026 | |
| One Piece Log Collection | "KOBY" | 1113–1122 | August 26, 2026 | |

=== English ===
Crunchyroll LLC (North America – Region 1/A); Madman Entertainment (Australia and New Zealand – Region 4/B)
| Volume | | Episodes | Release date | | | ISBN | Ref. |
| Volume | | Episodes | NA | UK & IE | AUS & NZ | ISBN | Ref. |
|---|---|---|---|---|---|---|---|
| Season 15 | Voyage 1 | 1086–1096 | TBA | — | — | ISBN N/A | |
| Season 15 | Voyage 2 | 1097–1108 | TBA | — | — | ISBN N/A | |
| Season 15 | Voyage 3 | 1108.5–1122 | TBA | — | — | ISBN N/A | |
| Season 15 | Voyage 4 | 1123–1133 | TBA | — | — | ISBN N/A | |
| Season 15 | Voyage 5 | 1133.5–1143 | TBA | — | — | ISBN N/A | |
| Season 15 | Voyage 6 | 1144–1155 | TBA | — | — | ISBN N/A | |
