= One Piece season 22 =

Season of television series

One Piece
- Season 22; Elbaph
- No. of episodes: 25

Release
- Original network: Fuji Television
- Original release: April 5, 2026 – present

Season chronology
- ← Previous; Season 21

The twenty-second season of the One Piece anime television series is produced by Toei Animation, directed by Yasunori Koyama and Wataru Matsumi. The season began broadcasting on Fuji Television and its FNS affiliates on April 5, 2026. Like the rest of the series, the season follows Monkey D. Luffy's adventures with his Straw Hat Pirates. The season adapts material from the "Elbaph" story arc, from the 111th volume onwards of the manga series One Piece by Eiichiro Oda. It focuses on the Straw Hat Pirates and Giant Warrior Pirates arriving in Elbaph as the Holy Knights of God set their eyes on annexing the country for the World Government.

In October 2025, it was announced that the series would go on hiatus from January to March 2026 following the conclusion of the "Egghead" story arc. When it returned in April 2026, the series was planned to adopt a two split cours annual schedule (although this did not happen, as it aired two consecutive cours in 2026), with a maximum of 26 episodes airing each year going forward. This marks a shift from the continuous year-round schedule that has been in place since the series' premiere back in October 1999. Additionally, Toei Animation announced their intention to begin adapting manga chapters at a slightly faster pace compared to recent preceding arcs.

For the first part, the opening theme song is "Luminous" (ルミナス), performed by Aina the End, while the ending theme song is "Sono Mirai" (その未来; lit. 'That Future'), performed by Jisoku 36km.

== Episodes ==
No. overall (Note: Episode number by Toei Animation's count)	No. in season	Title (Note: Title of the episode: literally translated, romanized using Hepburn romanization, and in kanji form)	Directed by	Written by	Original release date (Note: Date the episode originally aired on Fuji Television)	Viewership rating (Note: Viewership numbers reflect the Japanese TV animation weekly ratings in the Kantō region.)
1156	1	"The Long-sought Elbaph! The Big Reunion Banquet"; Transliteration: "Akogare no Erubafu! Saikai no Dekkē Utage" (Japanese: 憧れのエルバフ！再会のでっけェ宴)	Wataru Matsumi	Shōji Yonemura	April 5, 2026	2.5%
1157	2	"Nami in a Fix! An Adventure in Block Kingdom"; Transliteration: "Nami Konwaku! Burokku no Kuni no Bōken" (Japanese: ナミ困惑！ブロックの国の冒険)	Yasuhiro Tanabe	Tomohiro Nakayama	April 12, 2026	2.8%
1158	3	"A Quest in the Land of Mystery! The Secret of the Sun God"; Transliteration: "Nazo no Kuni no Kuesuto! Taiyō-shin no Himitsu" (Japanese: 謎の国の探索(クエスト)！太陽神の秘密)	Masanori Satō	Akiko Inoue	April 19, 2026	2.8%
1159	4	"Destroy the Miniature Garden - Escape Block Kingdom!"; Transliteration: "Hakoniwa o Bukkowase - Dasshutsu! Burokku no Kuni" (Japanese: 箱庭をブッ壊せ 脱出！ブロックの国)	Directed by : Nanami Michibata; Storyboarded by : Katsumi Tokoro, Nanami Michibata & Katsumi Ishizuka	Shinzō Fujita	April 26, 2026	2.6%
1160	5	"An Encounter on a Snowfield - Loki, the Accursed Prince"; Transliteration: "Setsugen no Kaigō - Noroi no Ōji Roki" (Japanese: 雪原の邂逅 呪いの王子ロキ)	Directed by : Shō Matsui; Storyboarded by : Wataru Matsumi & Shō Matsui	Jin Tanaka	May 3, 2026	2.2%
1161	6	"A Dangerous Deal! Loki of the Underworld and Luffy"; Transliteration: "Kiken'na Torihiki! Meikai no Roki to Rufi" (Japanese: 危険な取引！冥界のロキとルフィ)	Directed by : Shūhei Iwasawa; Storyboarded by : Toshinori Fukuzawa, Hazuki Omoya & Shūhei Iwasawa	Atsuhiro Tomioka	May 10, 2026	2.4%
1162	7	"A Gargantuan Wave of Emotion - The Dreamlike Scenery of Elbaph"; Transliteration: "Kyodaina Kandō - Yume no Zekkei Erubafu" (Japanese: 巨大な感動 夢の絶景エルバフ)	Katsumi Tokoro	Shōji Yonemura	May 17, 2026	2.5%
1163	8	"I Want You to Praise Me - The Reunion of Robin and Saul"; Transliteration: "Homete Hoshī - Robin to Sauro no Saikai" (Japanese: 褒めてほしい ロビンとサウロの再会)	Yasunori Koyama	Tomohiro Nakayama	May 24, 2026	2.7%
1164	9	"Saul's Resolve - The Inherited Will of Ohara"; Transliteration: "Sauro no Omoi - Uketsuga-reta Ohara no Ishi" (Japanese: サウロの想い 受け継がれたオハラの意志)	Yusuke Suzuki	Tomohiro Nakayama	May 31, 2026	2.5%
1165	10	"A Welcome with Friends' Cups and Intruders Seeking Loki"; Transliteration: "Kangei no "Tomo no Sakazuki" to Roki o Sagasu Shin'nyū-sha" (Japanese: 歓迎の〝友の盃〟とロキを探す侵入者)	Eri Hyun	Shinzō Fujita	June 7, 2026	2.8%
1166	11	"Encountering Loki - Gunko of the Knights of God"; Transliteration: "Roki to no Sōgū - Kami no Kishidan: Gunko" (Japanese: ロキとの遭遇 神の騎士団 軍子)	Tomohiro Higashi	Jin Tanaka	June 14, 2026	2.2%
1167	12	"Shamrock Appears - Commander of the Knights of God"; Transliteration: "Kami no Kishidan: Danchō - Shamurokku Tōjō" (Japanese: 神の騎士団 団長 シャムロック登場)	Shō Inuzuka	Tomohiro Nakayama	June 21, 2026	N/A
1168	13	"Ancient History - The Harley Passed Down by Elbaph"; Transliteration: "Taiko no Rekishi - Erubafu ga Kataritsugu "Hārei"" (Japanese: 太古の歴史 エルバフが語り継ぐ〝神典〟(ハーレイ))	Wataru Matsumi	Tomohiro Nakayama	June 28, 2026	N/A
1169	14	"The Legend Lurking in Elbaph - The Identity of the Mountain-Eater"; Transliteration: "Erubafu ni Hisomu Densetsu - "Yamagurai" no Shōtai" (Japanese: エルバフに潜む伝説 〝山喰らい〟の正体)	Kenichi Takeshita	Shinzō Fujita	July 12, 2026	N/A
1170	15	"Get the Key! Luffy vs. Scopper Gaban"; Transliteration: "Kagi o Ubae! Rufi tai Sukoppā Gyaban" (Japanese: 鍵を奪え！ルフィVS(たい)スコッパー・ギャバン)	Directed by : Kyōsuke Yamazaki; Storyboarded by : Yong-Ce Tu, Toshinori Fukuzawa & Kyōsuke Yamazaki	Jin Tanaka	July 19, 2026	2.3%
1171	16	"The Heinous Sinner - Loki of the Underworld Freed?!"; Transliteration: "Erubafu no Taizai-nin - Meikai no Roki Kaihō!?" (Japanese: エルバフの大罪人 冥界のロキ解放!?)	Katsumi Tokoro	Tomohiro Nakayama	July 26, 2026	N/A
1172	17	"Monsters Appear in Elbaph - 'What I Fear Most'"; Transliteration: "Kaibutsu Shutsugen - Erubafu o Osou "Kowai Mono"" (Japanese: 怪物出現 エルバフを襲う〝こわいもの〟)	Directed by : Nanami Michibata; Storyboarded by : Toshinori Fukuzawa, Katsumi Ishizuka & Miho Hirayama	Shinzō Fujita	August 2, 2026	2.0%
1173	18	"A Nightmarish Game - The Dark Plot of the Knights of God"; Transliteration: "Akumu no Gēmu - Kami no Kishidan no Inbō" (Japanese: 悪夢のゲーム 神の騎士団の陰謀)	Yūna Hirosue	Jin Tanaka	August 9, 2026	2.8%
1174	19	"Save the Children! The Elbaph Warriors Rise Up"; Transliteration: "Kodomo-tachi o Sukue! Erubafu no Senshi Shutsugeki" (Japanese: 子供達を救え！エルバフの戦士出撃)	Directed by : Kan Murakami; Storyboarded by : Kan Murakami & Miho Hirayama	Tomohiro Nakayama	August 16, 2026	2.7%
1175	20	"Elbaph in Flames! Jinbe's Shoulder Throw Explodes!"; Transliteration: "Erubafu Enjō - Sakuretsu! Jinbē no Ipponzeoi" (Japanese: エルバフ炎上 炸裂！ジンベエの一本背負い)	Eri Hyun	Shinzō Fujita	August 23, 2026	2.3%
1176	21	"The Threat of the Arrow-Arrow Fruit - Gunko vs. the Straw Hats"; Transliteration: "Aro-Aro no Mi no Kyōi - Gunko tai Mugiwara no Ichimi" (Japanese: アロアロの実の脅威 軍子VS(たい)麦わらの一味)	Directed by : Shūhei Iwasawa; Storyboarded by : Shūhei Iwasawa, Anikari, Hinata Narumi & Miho Hirayama	Tomohiro Nakayama	August 30, 2026	N/A
1177	22	"A Despicable Hostage Game - Sommers's Brazen Demands"; Transliteration: "Hiretsuna Hitojichi Gēmu - Somāzu no Futekina Kyōhaku" (Japanese: 卑劣な人質ゲーム ソマーズの不敵な脅迫)	Yusuke Suzuki	Tomohiro Nakayama	September 6, 2026	2.4%
1178	23	"Protect History and the Future - Robin and Gaban Go on the Attack"; Transliteration: "Rekishi to Mirai o Mamore - Robin to Gyaban Shutsugeki" (Japanese: 歴史と未来を守れ ロビンとギャバン出撃)	Directed by : Shō Matsui; Storyboarded by : Toshinori Fukuzawa & Shō Matsui	Shinzō Fujita	September 13, 2026	N/A
1179	24	"One Do-or-Die Second - Gaban vs. the Knights of God"; Transliteration: "Kesshi no Ichi-byō - Gyaban tai Kami no Kishidan" (Japanese: 決死の一秒 ギャバンVS(たい)神の騎士団)	Shō Inuzuka	Jin Tanaka	September 20, 2026	2.6%
1180	25	"Elbaph in Despair - Diabolical Covenant, 'Domi Reversi'"; Transliteration: "Zetsubō no Erubafu - Akuma no Keiyaku "Domi Ribāshi"" (Japanese: 絶望のエルバフ 悪魔の契約〝黒転支配〟(ドミ・リバーシ))	Wataru Matsumi	Tomohiro Nakayama	September 27, 2026	N/A

== Special ==
No. overall	No. in season	Title	Directed by	Written by	Animation directed by	Original release date	Viewership rating
SP	SP	"One Piece: Heroines"	Haruka Kamatani	Momoka Toyoda	Takashi Kojima	July 5, 2026	2.5%
