= List of One Piece chapters (1016–current) =

Volume 101 of One Piece, released in Japan by Shueisha on December 3, 2021

One Piece is a Japanese manga series written and illustrated by Eiichiro Oda which has been translated into various languages and spawned a substantial media franchise, including animated and live action television series, films, video games, and associated music and merchandise. It follows the adventures of the teenaged boy and pirate captain Monkey D. Luffy, whose body gained the properties of rubber after he accidentally ate a supernatural fruit, as he travels the oceans in search of the series' titular treasure and organizes a diverse crew, named the Straw Hats.

In Japan, the series is published by Shueisha. Individual chapters have been published regularly in the shōnen manga anthology Weekly Shōnen Jump since July 22, 1997 and tankōbon format volumes (each collecting 10 to 12 chapters) have been published since December 24, 1997. The series spans over 1175 chapters and, as of March 2026, has 114 tankōbon volumes, making One Piece the 20th longest manga series by volume count.

The series has been translated and released in multiple countries. English localization began in North America, where Viz Media currently serializes One Piece in the Shonen Jump digital vault simultaneously with Japan. It originally published its English language adaptation of the series in the now-defunct monthly print anthology Shonen Jump starting with the magazine's launch in November 2002. It also publishes tankōbon format books since June 2003, which have been collected into omnibus editions incorporating three tankōbon each since December 2009; chapters and books also are published digitally through its website. In the United Kingdom, the tankōbon were published by Gollancz Manga, starting March 2006, until Viz Media took over after the fourteenth volume. In Australia and New Zealand, the English volumes have been distributed by Madman Entertainment since November 10, 2008. By October 6, 2009, only 22 volumes had been released in English. However, as announced in July 2009, Viz Media increased that number to 53 by June 2010, using an accelerated publishing schedule of five volumes per month during the first half of 2010. As of November 2025, 110 volumes of the English version have been officially released by Viz Media.

== Volumes ==
No.	Title	Original release date	English release date
101	The Stars Take the Stage; Hanagata Tōjō (花形登場)	December 3, 2021; 978-4-08-883003-2	December 6, 2022; 978-1-9747-3420-7
1016. "It's Me, Otama!!" (お玉でやんす!!, "Otama de Yansu!!"); 1017. "The Order" (号令, "Gōrei"); 1018. "Jimbei vs. Who's-Who" (ジンベエvs.フーズ・フー, "Jinbē Bāsasu Fūzu Fū"); 1019. "Heliceratops" (ヘリケラトプス, "Herikeratopusu"); 1020. "Robin vs. Black Maria" (ロビンvs.ブラックマリア, "Robin Bāsasu Burakkumaria"); 1021. "Demonio" (デモニオ); 1022. "The Stars Take the Stage" (花形登場, "Hanagata Tōjō"); 1023. "Spitting Image" (瓜二つ, "Urifutatsu"); 1024. "So-and-So" (某, "Nanigashi"); 1025. "Twin Dragons" (双龍図, "Sōryūzu")
The lightning cloud Zeus defects from Big Mom to Nami, and together they defeat Ulti. Yamato ascends to the roof and vows to hold Kaido back until Luffy can return. Otama uses the amplified public address system to sway the loyalty of more smile fruit gifters. Queen fights Sanji, bragging that as a cyborg, he has surpassed the Germa 66 technology. Jimbei defeats Who's-Who, who is a rogue CP9 agent. Franky beats Sasaki with the Gaon Cannon and Franky Radical Beam attacks. Black Maria taunts Robin, who turns into a giant demon to defeat her. After being rescued, Luffy eats to recover, then commands Momonosuke to assume his dragon form and fly him back to Onigashima; Momonosuke asks Shinobu to age him to an adult. Raizo and Fukurokuju fight to a stalemate. Killer beats Hawkins down to a single straw doll, but pauses when Hawkins says the damage he inflicts will be transferred to Kid. Zoro and Sanji take over battling King and Queen from Marco. Dogstorm and Cat Viper turn sulong, fighting Jack and Perrospero, respectively. Momonosuke manages to fly to the island with Luffy to confront Kaido.
102	The Pivotal Clash; Tennōzan (天王山)	April 4, 2022; 978-4-08-883120-6	April 4, 2023; 978-1-9747-3655-3
1026. "The Pivotal Clash" (天王山, "Tennōzan"); 1027. "Danger Beyond Imagining" (想像を超える危機, "Sōzō o Koeru Kiki"); 1028. "Brachiosnakeus" (ブラキオ蛇ウルス, "Burakiojaurusu"); 1029. "The Tower" (塔, "Tawā"); 1030. "Echoing the Impermanence of All Things" (諸行無常の響きあり, "Shogyōmujō no Hibiki Ari"); 1031. "Warrior of Science" (科学の戦士, "Kagaku no Senshi"); 1032. "Oden's Beloved Blade" (おでんの愛刀, "Oden no Aitō"); 1033. "Shimotsuki Kozaburo" (霜月コウ三郎, "Shimotsuki Kōzaburō"); 1034. "Sanji vs. Queen" (サンジvs.クイーン, "Sanji Bāsasu Kuīn"); 1035. "Zoro vs. King" (ゾロvs.キング, "Zoro Bāsasu Kingu")
Luffy encourages dragon Momonosuke to bite dragon Kaido and asks why he is afraid of anything else. The dragons bring stormy weather, but as Luffy clashes with Kaido, the heavens split and with restored sulong, Dogstorm and Cat Viper wipe out Jack and Perospero, respectively. As Kaido struggles, Onigashima starts to lose altitude; Yamato, fearing the armory could explode, runs to the basement. While fighting Queen, Sanji's body reacts oddly and he fears using the Germa 66 suit may have awakened the Vinsmoke genetic programming; he asks Zoro to kill him if his behavior changes. Killer outwits Hawkins and defeats him while removing the threat to Kid. Orochi asks Kanjuro to animate the enduring anger of their shared Kurozumi family as a living flame, which moves relentlessly toward the armory. The members of CP0 emerge from hiding and begin fighting Drake and Apoo. During his fight with King, one of the last Lunarians, Zoro struggles with his new blade, Enma, inherited from Oden, but discovers and defeats King's secret defense. Sanji learns that Queen had beaten a courtesan, giving him the motivation to win their fight. Komurasaki returns, luring out Orochi.
103	Warrior of Liberation; Kaihō no Senshi (解放の戦士)	August 4, 2022; 978-4-08-883190-9	July 4, 2023; 978-1-9747-3870-0
1036. "Bushido Is the Way of Death" (武士道と云うは死ぬことと見つけたり, "Bushidō to Iu wa Shinu Koto to Mitsuketari"); 1037. "Drunken Dragon Bagua" (酒龍八卦, "Shuron Hakke"); 1038. "Kid & Law vs. Big Mom" (キッド&ローvs.ビッグ・マム, "Kiddo Ando Rō Bāsasu Biggu Mamu"); 1039. "Top Billing" (大トリ, "Ōtori"); 1040. "Wasted Words on Young Ears" (新世代の耳に念仏, "Gaki no Mimi ni Nenbutsu"); 1041. "Komurasaki" (小紫); 1042. "The Victor Needs No Epithet" (枕詞は"勝者"にゃつかねェ, "Makurakotoba wa 'Shōsha' nya Tsukanē"); 1043. "Let's Face Death Together!!!" (一緒に死のうよ!!!, "Issho ni Shinō yo!!!"); 1044. "Warrior of Liberation" (解放の戦士, "Kaihō no Senshi"); 1045. "Next Level"; 1046. "Raizo" (雷ぞう, "Raizō")
Zoro prevails against King. Yamato manages to stop the burning hate from exploding the armory by freezing the bombs. Law and Kid squabble over who takes credit, but manage to drive Big Mom into a deep hole; as she tries to extract their souls, Law silences her and Kid finishes, pushing her deep underground. Orochi demands that Komurasaki plays "Moon Princess"; after he is trapped by rubble and prevented from transforming by Sea Prism stone, she says, as Hiyori, that it was her father Oden's favorite song. Kanjuro returns as the living flame, burning the trapped Orochi. Izo is defeated by CP0. Hearing that Big Mom has been defeated, Kaido and Luffy renew their fight; a masked CP0 agent manages to distract Luffy and Kaido lands a solid hit, extinguishing his voice. Kaido announces Luffy is dead and demands Momonosuke submit to him; Zunesha, speaking to Momonosuke, tells him that Joyboy has returned. The five elders of the World Government explain: the Gum-Gum Fruit is actually a Mythical Zoan Type Human-Human Fruit: Model Nika, also known as the Warrior of Liberation or the Sun God; Luffy has awakened its true powers as Nika, calling it Gear Five, and begins fighting Kaido again. Although the fire set by Kanjuro is raging out of control, Raizo and Jimbei use stored water to extinguish it for good.
104	Shogun of Wano, Kozuki Momonosuke; Wano Kuni Shōgun – Kōzuki Momonosuke (ワノ国将軍 光月モモの助)	November 4, 2022; 978-4-08-883287-6	November 7, 2023; 978-1-9747-4129-8
1047. "The Sky over the Capital" (都の空, "Miyako no Sora"); 1048. "Twenty Years" (二十年, "Nijū Nen"); 1049. "The World That Should Be" (目指すべき世界, "Mezasubeki Sekai"); 1050. "Honor" (誉れ, "Homare"); 1051. "Shogun of Wano, Kozuki Momonosuke" (ワノ国将軍 光月モモの助, "Wano Kuni Shōgun – Kōzuki Momonosuke"); 1052. "A New Morning" (新しい朝, "Atarashii Asa"); 1053. "New Emperors" (新しい皇帝達, "Atarashii Kōtei-tachi"); 1054. "Flame Emperor" (炎帝, "Entei"); 1055. "The New Era" (新時代, "Shin Jidai")
As Orochi rises again to threaten Hiyori, he is killed by Denjiro. Luffy asks Momonosuke to move Onigashima so he can strike Kaido, sending him into the magma alongside Big Mom and causing a volcanic eruption. Otoko, celebrating the Fire Festival with Otama's Master Tengu, changes the message on her sky lantern to thank her father Yasu. Momonosuke ascends to shogun and announces the twenty years of terror under Orochi and Kaido have ended. After seven days asleep of his fierce battles, Luffy and Zoro awaken to join the celebratory feasts. The bounties on Law, Kid, and Luffy are raised to three billion berries each, and with three emperors defeated, Blackbeard, Luffy, and surprisingly Buggy are named as their replacements. Communications also bring the unwelcome news that King Nefeltari Cobra is dead, and Sabo is accused of the murder. Admiral Ryokugyu spars with the Akazaya Nine, Yamato, and Momonosuke; Momonosuke and Shanks manage to drive him off. Master Tengu takes off his mask, revealing himself as Kozuki Sukiyaki to Nico Robin; they discuss the Poneglyphs and he confirms the ancient weapon Pluton is in Wano. Sukiyaki explains that "opening the borders" means physically tearing down the walls surrounding Wano, revealing Pluton.
105	Luffy's Dream; Rufi no Yume (ルフィの夢)	March 3, 2023; 978-4-08-883436-8	March 12, 2024; 978-1-9747-4327-8
1056. "Cross Guild"; 1057. "The End" (終幕, Shūmaku); 1058. "New Emperors" (新皇帝, "Shin Kōtei"); 1059. "The Matter Involving Captain Koby" (コビー大佐の一件, "Kobī Taisa no Ikken"); 1060. "Luffy's Dream" (ルフィの夢, "Rufi no Yume"); 1061. "Future Island Egghead" (未来島エッグヘッド, "Mirai-jima Egguheddo"); 1062. "Adventure in the Land of Science" (科学の国の冒険, "Kagaku no Kuni no Bōken"); 1063. "My Only Family" (たった1人の家族, "Tatta Hitori no Kazoku"); 1064. "Egghead Labophase" (エッグヘッド研究層, "Egguheddo Rabofēzu"); 1065. "Six Vegapunks" (6人のベガパンク, "Roku-nin no Begapanku")
Dogstorm and Cat Viper appoint Carrot to be the next king of Mokomo, as they plan to stay in Wano. Momonosuke arrives as the pirates depart and Luffy gives him a Straw Hat pirate flag, saying Momo can always count on his help. Although Buggy is celebrated as an real emperor of the sea for creating a crew to hunt the Navy, the real strength are Crocodile and Mihawk, who are mistaken as Buggy's subordinates due to the promotions of his overzealous followers, but decide to use him as a figurehead to draw attention away from them and have the clown take the heat. The Navy's new Seraphim Pacifistas are deployed and overwhelm the Kuja Pirates and the Blackbeard Pirates invading to steal Hancock's devil fruit; Rayleigh successfully saves Hancock and negotiates a settlement, but Blackbeard kidnaps Koby. Luffy reveals his dream to the crew, saying it can't happen until after he becomes King of the Pirates. Sabo calls Dragon from Lulusia, relating King Cobra's death to the empty throne before the transmission is cut off; a massive explosion has erased Lulusia, causing turbulent seas worldwide. Aboard the Sunny, the Straw Hats rescue Jewelry Bonney from a robotic sea beast; in the chaos, Luffy, Bonney, Chopper, and Jimbei are separated and wash up on Egghead Island, where Dr. Vegapunk, leader of the Navy's Special Science Group, has his laboratory; Bonney has traveled there to ask Vegapunk to restore the mind of her father, Bartholomew Kuma, and plans to kill Vegapunk if he is unable to do so. The Sunny and remaining crew are rescued by Lilith, Punk-02; Vegapunk has split his consciousness from his main body, Stella, into six satellite bodies. CP0, led by Rob Lucci, is also traveling to the island, but their goal is to eliminate Vegapunk. Shaka, Punk-01, tells the Straw Hats that as advanced as Egghead Island is, similar advances existed 900 years ago.
106	A Genius's Dream; Tensai no Yume (天才の夢)	July 4, 2023; 978-4-08-883644-7	July 2, 2024; 978-1-9747-4586-9
1066. "The Will of Ohara" (オハラの意志, "Ohara no Ishi"); 1067. "Punk Records"; 1068. "A Genius's Dream" (天才の夢, "Tensai no Yume"); 1069. "All Things Are Brought Into This World With Hope" (万物は望まれて、この世に生まれる, "Banbutsu wa Nozomarete, Kono Yo ni Umareru"); 1070. "The Strongest Form of Humanity" (最強の人類, "Saikyō no Jinrui"); 1071. "The Hero Deploys" (英雄出撃, "Eiyū Shutsugeki"); 1072. "The Weight of Memory" (記憶の重さ, "Kioku no Omosa"); 1073. "Miss Buckingham Stussy" (ミス・バッキンガム・ステューシー, "Misu Bakkingamu Sutyūshī"); 1074. "Mk. III" (マークIII, "Māku Surī"); 1075. "Labophase Death Game" (研究層 DEATH GAME, "Rabofēzu Desu Gēmu"); 1076. "Old Friends" (旧友, "Kyūyū")
Shaka explains the 20 kingdoms (which later formed the World Government) won a war with an advanced civilization during the mysterious Void Century; Ohara was destroyed after learning the Void Century events, and Vegapunk studied the events from Ohara's ruins, to his peril. The original Vegapunk (Stella) has an eidetic memory with the brain-brain fruit; since his head physically expands with more knowledge, he created an electronic memory storage, then built the six satellites using separate personality aspects: Shaka (01, Good), Lilith (02, Evil), Edison (03, Thinker), Pythagoras (04, Wisdom), Atlas (05, Violence), and York (06, Greed). As CP0 (Lucci, Kaku, and Stussy) arrive, Vegapunk asks Luffy to help him escape because he knows the truth about the Void Century and the World Government sees him as a threat. At the Kamabakka Queendom, Kuma awakens and flees; at the Red Line, he climbs toward Marijoa. Lucci destroys Atlas and Luffy fights him, enlisting Sentomaru's reluctant help. The Seraphim derive devil fruit powers from the Warlords: S-Bear (Kuma), S-Snake (Hancock), S-Shark (Jimbei), and S-Hawk (Mihawk); they help CP0 after Sentomaru is defeated. After CP0 arrive at the Labophase upper dome, Stussy betrays them, disabling Lucci and Kaku; Vegapunk commands the Seraphim to help. Garp arrives at Naval Base G-14 to rescue Koby from Blackbeard's headquarters, Fullalead Island. Stussy (CP0) is a clone of Buckingham Stussy of the Rocks Pirates, who claims to be the mother of Whitebeard's son, Edward Weevil; Weevil was abducted by Admiral Ryokugyu. Sentomaru deploys 50 Pacifista Mk IIIs to help Vegapunk's escape. Bonney abducts Vegapunk and finds Kuma's painful memories. As the other satellites search for Vegapunk, S-Snake petrifies York, mystifying the satellites, as only Vegapunk or the Five Elders could countermand their orders. Luffy and Zoro team up with Lucci and Kaku to fight S-Bear. On Elbaph, Dorry and Brogy have returned; Shanks prepares to battle Kid with their help.
107	The Hero of Legend; Densetsu no Eiyū (伝説の英雄)	November 2, 2023; 978-4-08-883785-7	November 12, 2024; 978-1-9747-4979-9
1077. "Should Have Noticed Sooner" (早く気づくべきだった, "Hayaku Kizukubeki datta"); 1078. "Escape Limit" (脱出リミット, "Dasshutsu Rimitto"); 1079. "The Emperor's Crew, the Red-Haired Pirates" (「四皇」赤髪海賊団, "'Yonkō' Akagami Kaizoku-dan"); 1080. "The Hero of Legend" (伝説の英雄, "Densetsu no Eiyū"); 1081. "Tenth Ship Captain of the Blackbeard Pirates, Kuzan" (黒ひげ海賊団10番船船長クザン, "Kurohige Kaizoku-dan Jūban-sen Senchō Kuzan"); 1082. "Let's Go and Take It!!" (取りに行こうぜ!!, "Tori ni Ikō ze!!"); 1083. "The Truth of That Day" (あの日の真実, "Ano Hi no Shinjitsu"); 1084. "The Attempted Murder of a Celestial Dragon" (天竜人殺人未遂事件, "Tenryūbito Satsujin Misui Jiken"); 1085. "The Death of Nefertari Cobra" (ネフェルタリ・コブラ死す, "Neferutari Kobura Shisu"); 1086. "The Five Elders" (五老星, "Gorōsei"); 1087. "Battleship Bags" (軍艦バッグ, "Gunkan Baggu"); 1088. "Final Lesson" (最後の授業, "Saigo no Jugyō")
Sentomaru orders an evacuation of Egghead Island, fearing the same fate as Ohara. The Five Elders decide to visit with Admiral Kizaru. Zoro explains the Seraphim have a similar unbreakable defense as Lunarians when they are aflame; several teams battle them: Nami, Brook, Sanji, and Edison vs. S-Shark; Franky, Usopp, and Lilith lose to S-Snake, who also stomps Pythagoras. Zoro and Kaku pursue S-Hawk while Luffy and Lucci continue to fight S-Bear. Shaka finds Vegapunk, but is shot by York, who has turned traitor in exchange for becoming a Celestial Dragon. After departing Wano, both Law and Kid are defeated by Emperors: Kid, by a single blow from Shanks on Elbaph; Law, by Blackbeard on Winner Island and their submarine, the Polar Tang, is sunk, but Bepo turns sulong and escapes. Buggy fed up by Crocodile and Mihawk's abuse and small ambitions, inspires his crew to join the race for the One Piece. Sabo returns to the Kamabakka Queendom and debriefs Iva and Dragon on the Reverie at Marijoa. Cobra upon meeting with the five elders to discuss his ancestor Nefertari Lili and the Will of D. witnesses a giant shadowy figure named Imu ascend the Empty Throne before them to answer the king's questions and well as ask their own, for which he was mortally wounded to silence Cobra after finding out Lili's full name in Nefertari D. Lili; Sabo attempted a rescue, but Cobra told him to flee and tell both Luffy and Vivi they share the Will of D. CP0 abducts Vivi and Wapol witnessing Cobra's death inadvertently saves her, before they flee for their lives with Morgans. Imu commands that Vegapunk's Mother Flame be used on Lulusia. On Fullalead, Koby frees himself and several Navy officers (Kujaku, Prince Grus, Hibari, and Garp) help him escape. Kuzan, ex-Admiral Aokiji, who started as Garp's apprentice now has joined Blackbeard. Koby destroys the giant hand of Pizarro; Garp stays behind to fight Kuzan and is captured.
108	Better Off Dead In This World; Shinda Hō ga Ii Sekai (死んだ方がいい世界)	March 4, 2024; 978-4-08-884013-0	March 4, 2025; 978-1-9747-5222-5
1089. "Hostage Situation" (立てこもり事件, "Tatekomori Jiken"); 1090. "Kizaru" (黄猿); 1091. "Sentomaru" (戦桃丸, "Sentōmaru"); 1092. "Kuma the Tyrant's Holy Land Rampage" (暴君くま聖地暴走事件, "Bōkun Kuma Seichi Bōsō Jiken"); 1093. "Luffy vs. Kizaru" (ルフィvs.黄猿, "Rufi Bāsasu Kizaru"); 1094. "Five Elders, Godhead of Science & Defense, St. Jaygarcia Saturn" (「五老星」科学防衛武神ジェイガルシア・サターン聖, "'Gorōsei' Kagaku Bōei Bushin Jeigarushia Satān-sei"); 1095. "Better Off Dead In This World" (死んだ方がいい世界, "Shinda Hō ga Ii Sekai"); 1096. "Kumachi" (くまちー, "Kumachī"); 1097. "Ginny" (ジニー, "Jinī"); 1098. "Bonney's Birth" (ボニー誕生, "Bonī Tanjō"); 1099. "Pacifist" (平和主義者, "Heiwa Shugisha"); 1100. "Thank You, Bonney" (ありがとうボニー, "Arigatō Bonī")
Six days after Lulusia disappeared, leaving an unfillable hole, a massive earthquake rocks the world. Kuma reaches the top of Marijoa and fights Fleet Admiral Akainu briefly, then disappears again. York is captured by the Straw Hats. Kizaru defeats Sentomaru and jumps into the dome, kicking Bonney to the island below before Luffy knocks him out. Vegapunk, Atlas, and Sanji descend to retrieve Bonney, who ineffectively stabs St. Jaygarcia Saturn, one of the Five Elders, after he arrives; Saturn sentences her and the Straw Hats to death for rebellion. In a flashback starting 47 years ago, the last of the Buccaneer race, infant Kuma and his father Clapp are enslaved; Clapp promises liberation to Kuma, telling the legend of Nika, which Kuma passes in turn to Bonney. Nine years later, the Celestial Dragons hold a manhunt on God Valley; enslaved siblings Ginny and Ivankov reveal an escape plan: Ginny's call has attracted the Rocks and Roger pirates and Iva will steal the two devil fruits offered as prizes. Kuma volunteers to be their decoy. Iva and Kuma each seize a fruit but Linlin overpowers Iva and gives it to Kaido. Kuma eats the other, giving him the "Hands of Liberation" which he uses to save 500+, including Iva and Ginny, who vows to care for Kuma. At 25, after taking over his father's church, Kuma is jailed for protesting King Bekori's support of slavery, which ends after the Revolutionary Army liberates the island; both Kuma and Ginny join the RA. Eight years later, she is captured, then enslaved and impregnated by a Celestial Dragon; after two years, Ginny contracts Sapphire Scales, a terminal illness which covered her skin in hard blue stones after being exposed to light. Her baby Bonney inherits both her appetite and disease; she already possesses age-age fruit powers. King Bekori returns, but is deposed by Kuma, who earns the unjust nickname "Tyrant"; declared a pirate after fighting the Navy, Kuma encounters Dragon, who says Vegapunk can cure Bonney. In exchange for stem cell therapy, Vegapunk clones Kuma into an army of Pacifista peacekeepers, but Saturn adds more conditions: Kuma joins the seven Warlords; then, after modification as the prototype PX-0 cyborg, has his free will removed. He gladly accepts for Bonney. Kuma and Bonney share six happy months together under Vegapunk's care, then are separated forever, as she is held hostage to ensure Kuma's loyalty until his development is finished.
109	On Your Side; Kimi no Mikata (きみの味方)	July 4, 2024; 978-4-08-884196-0	July 1, 2025; 978-1-9747-5590-5
1101. "To Bonney" (ボニーへ, "Bonī e"); 1102. "Kuma's Life" (くまの人生, "Kuma no Jinsei"); 1103. "I'm Sorry, Daddy" (ごめんね、お父さん, "Gomen ne, Otō-san"); 1104. "Thank You, Daddy" (ありがとう、お父さん, "Arigatō, Otō-san"); 1105. "The Height of Folly" (愚の骨頂, "Gu no Kotchō"); 1106. "On Your Side" (きみの味方, "Kimi no Mikata"); 1107. "I've Been Looking For You!!" (あんたを捜してたんだ!!, "Anta o Sagashitetanda!!"); 1108. "Come In, World" (応答せよ、世界, "Ōtō seyo, Sekai"); 1109. "Interception" (阻止, "Soshi"); 1110. "Starfall" (降星, "Kōsei")
Bonney learns the depth of her father's love and she finally forgives Vegapunk. Kuma wrote frequently to Bonney, but Alpha, a Cipher Pol agent posing as her nurse, intercepted and destroyed each letter. With the Sapphire Scales cured when she was nine and a half, Bonney left immediately to find Kuma, crushing Alpha with a Nika-inspired fist. After encountering Luffy and the Straw Hats twice (at Thriller Bark and Sabaody), Kuma believed they would save the world, and decided to disperse them to preserve their futures. Back on Egghead, Saturn gloats he had infected Ginny and gave age-age fruit extract to an infant Bonney, but his mortal blow is shielded by the arrival of Kuma. Saturn forced Vegapunk to build a self-destruct into Kuma; Kuma's final requests were to add an order to guard Sunny, and wish Bonney a happy 10th birthday. After Saturn activated the self-destruct, it lobotomized Kuma, leaving him with the sole instinct to protect Bonney. Saturn makes a Buster Call to raze Egghead Island, forcing a disorderly evacuation. Saturn orders the Pacifistas to open fire, but Vegapunk, fearing they could be used to kill Bonney, had programmed unbreakable loyalty to her and they instead disrupt the Buster Call. Saturn stabs Vegapunk and orders Kizaru to kill Bonney and Kuma, but Luffy revives with a full tummy as Gear Five/Nika and effortlessly stops the Admiral. Repelled by the Pacifistas, the Navy also are thwarted from targeting Bonney by Dorry and Brogy, who arrived at Egghead with the newly revived Giant Pirates. Catarina Devon and Van Augur of the Blackbeard Pirates arrive with a mysterious mission. As Sanji spirits Vegapunk away, Vegapunk's pre-recorded worldwide broadcast starts automatically upon his death. Ominous black lightning heralds the arrival of the other Five Elders as mythical Yōkai. Ju Peter swallows Luffy, but he is freed when Dorry and Brogy behead the worm; however, like Saturn, this has little permanent effect as each Elder demonstrates amazing regenerative powers. The remaining Straw Hats flee while Zoro defeats Lucci.
110	The Upheaval of the Era; Jidai no Uneri (時代のうねり)	November 1, 2024; 978-4-08-884314-8	November 11, 2025; 978-1-9747-5896-8
1111. "Sun-Shield" (太陽の盾, "Taiyō no Tate"); 1112. "Hard Aspects" (ハードアスペクト, "Hādo Asupekuto"); 1113. "Stalemate"; 1114. "The Wings of Icarus" (イカロスの翼, "Ikarosu no Tsubasa"); 1115. "Pieces of a Continent" (大陸の断片, "Tairiku no Danpen"); 1116. "Inner Conflict" (葛藤, "Kattō"); 1117. "A" (も, "Mo"); 1118. "The Most Free" (自由になる, "Jiyū ni Naru"); 1119. "EMET" (エメト, "Emeto"); 1120. "Atlas" (暴, "Atorasu"); 1121. "The Upheaval of the Era" (時代のうねり, "Jidai no Uneri")
Jimbei takes Zoro away as Lucci gives a status update. Dorry and Brogy signal a retreat and shield Luffy from a fierce attack; in turn, he bats away explosives and continues to fight. Elders surround the Straw Hats as they converge on the Sunny. The Pacifistas are defeated; Stussy stays behind to lower the Frontier Dome. Vegapunk shocks the world with his broadcast prophesizing it will sink into the sea, and expresses regret that his research to develop the Mother Flame led him to the Void Century. During the Void Century, which ended 800 years ago, the first pirate, who was named Joyboy and had Nika-like stretching powers, waged war on what is now the World Government. The war ended after the three ancient weapons were used, raising sea levels and creating the current world geography. Joyboy preserved the ancient weapons; York stole a piece of the Mother Flame to activate one of them, which was used to destroy Lulusia. After they learned the truth of the Void Century, Gol D. Roger's crew disbanded. As the world reacts to Vegapunk's revelations, Jimbei and Zoro repel Nusjuro's attack on the Sunny and Dorry, Brogy, and Luffy reach the Giants' ship, reuniting with Bonney. York confidently declares the transponder snail is hidden in the Iron Giant, named EMET. Vegapunk's message, relating to the Will of D, is interrupted as the Five Elders blast EMET into the sea. Luffy teaches Bonney how to become the most free, and two Nikas engage the Elders. EMET rises from the depths to continue the transmission. 26 years ago, Professor Clou D. Clover begged Vegapunk to help study the Void Century; Vegapunk's final words are an atonement for refusing. Atlas knocks out Lilith and sacrifices herself to knock down Nusjuro so the Sunny can escape. EMET is overjoyed to see Luffy, calling him Joyboy, and prepares to use its ultimate weapon. Luffy and Bonney vanquish Saturn with a combined flurry of punches. Vegapunk's message finally concludes, warning the apocalyptic weapons still exists and the fate of the world rests with whoever finds the One Piece.
111	Adventure in Elbaph; Erubafu no Bōken (エルバフの冒険)	March 4, 2025; 978-4-08-884491-6	March 10, 2026; 978-1-9747-6228-6
1122. "Time is Right" (イザッテトキ, "Izatte Toki"); 1123. "The Void Fortnight" (空白の2週間, "Kūhaku no Nishūkan"); 1124. "Close Friend" (親友, "Shin'yū"); 1125. "What Death Means" (何をもって死とするか, "Nani o Motte Shi to Suru ka"); 1126. "Settling the Score" (落とし前, "Otoshimae"); 1127. "Adventure in the Land of Mystery" (謎の国の冒険, "Nazo no Kuni no Bōken"); 1128. "RPG"; 1129. "Livedolls" (生人形, "Rivudōru"); 1130. "The Accursed Prince" (呪いの王子, "Noroi no Ōji"); 1131. "Loki in the Underworld" (冥界のロキ, "Meikai no Roki"); 1132. "Adventure in Elbaph" (エルバフの冒険, "Erubafu no Bōken"); 1133. "Nice Things" (褒めてほしい, "Homete Hoshii")
As pirates rejoice, Koby vows to stop Luffy's dream at all cost. After Vegapunk discovered York's betrayal, he made the recording and erased their memories to preserve secrecy. The Egghead battle ends after EMET unleashes Joyboy's stored haki, sending the Elders back to Mariejois; Saturn laments the Elders' failure to stop Vegapunk's message, then is executed by a wrathful Imu for not preventing JoyBoy (Luffy)'s escape, who replaces him with St. Figarland Garling. Kizaru tearfully asks Sakazuki if he ever had to kill a close friend. Lilith, the only satellite to escape with the Straw Hats, explains that Vegapunk has survived through her; York watches Punk Records floating away, commanded by a composite Vegapunk satellite. On Fullalead, Kuzan tells Blackbeard that Koby escaped, but Garp was captured alive, and Lafitte reports the Revolutionaries' blockade is starving Mariejois. The Giant Pirates set sail aboard the Great Erik for Elbaph with the Straw Hats and Bonney; after two days of celebration, the Giants wake up to find the Sunny missing along with several Straw Hats (Luffy, Zoro, Nami, Usopp, Sanji, and Chopper), who explore the LEGO-like Bigstein Castle in a cage on Elbaph Island. They were abducted by Rodo, navigator of the New Giant Pirates and a self-proclaimed Sun God. They escape after Nami blasts Rodo with lightning from Zeus, crossing a chasm on a rope bridge, where they pass the New Giant Pirates doctor (Gerd), cook (Goldberg), and mascot (Piper the owl) coming to investigate Rodo. Luffy jumps down to the lower (underworld) level of Elbaph, finding the imprisoned Giant Prince Loki, Hajrudin's brother, who offers to destroy one rival pirate crew for his freedom and swears Luffy to secrecy. Luffy flies back out and meets Gerd and Goldberg, who have retrieved the Sunny. Rodo catches up to Chopper, but Nami, Zoro and Sanji flatten him. The remaining New Giant Pirates, Hajrudin and shipwright Stansen, hunt a massive moose-lizard for a welcoming feast, then reunite with the returning Great Erik, which sails via rainbow bridge to the middle (sun) level. Luffy and the other Straw Hats accompany Robin to her reunion with Saul.
112	The Harley; Hārei (神典)	July 4, 2025; 978-4-08-884563-0	July 7, 2026; 978-1-9747-1652-4
1134. "The Owl Library" (フクロウの図書館, "Fukurō no Toshokan"); 1135. "Friends' Cups" (友の盃, "Tomo no Sakazuki"); 1136. "The Land That Awaits the Sun" (太陽を待つ国, "Taiyō o Matsu Kuni"); 1137. "Introducing Shamrock" (シャムロック登場, "Shamurokku Tōjō"); 1138. "The Harley" (神典, "Hārei"); 1139. "Mountain-Eater" (山喰らい, "Yama-Gurai"); 1140. "Scopper Gaban" (スコッパー・ギャバン, "Sukoppā Gyaban"); 1141. "An Older Woman" (歳上の女, "Toshiue no Onna"); 1142. "What I'm Afraid Of" (わたしのこわいもの, "Watashi no Kowai Mono"); 1143. "Holy Knights" (神の騎士団, "Kami no Kishidan"); 1144. "A Time for Warriors" (戦士の時間, "Senshi no Jikan")
Saul recognizes the friendship between the Straw Hats and Robin and thanks them for saving her. King Harald redirected the Giants to pursue trade, not war, and preserved the books of Ohara in the Walrus School's Owl Library. Bonney and Lilith ask to settle on Elbaph. The Giants host a feast for the Straw Hats and raise friends' cups; at the party, Giant elder Beardhill Jarul explains their religious text Harley states the world has been destroyed twice: first, the earth god's rage burned the world and second, the sea god drowned it, coinciding with the Void Century. In the third, ongoing era, the Sun God is guiding the world to its end. Two Holy Knights of God arrive on Elbaph: heterochromic St. Manmayer Gunko (arrow-arrow fruit) and Shanks' older twin brother St. Figarland Shamrock, who nearly kills Loki with his sentient sword Cerberus before returning to Mariejois. Gunko summons the Holy Knights St. Shepherd Sommers and St. Rimoshifu Killingham. Rodo explains the largest race of Giants are the horned Ancient Giants, including Oars and Harald, whose two sons are illegitimate Hajrudin and horned heir Loki. The Giants tell Luffy that Loki is no good, but he sneaks away with Zoro, Nami, and Rodo to free him, stopping at King Harald's long-sealed Aurust Castle where he fights Scopper Gaban, the "left arm of Pirate King Roger", for the key to Loki's cuffs. Rodo returns to the party and confesses he took Luffy to free Loki; the New Giant Pirates hurry to the underworld and arrive just as Loki stands and draws the massive hammer Ragnir, but Luffy knocks him down. As children, Loki bullied Hajrudin and insulted his mother, but Harald named both his sons, asking they work together to support Elbaph; back in the present, Loki asks if Hajrudin really believes he killed Harald. Elsewhere, Walrus School students panic as their fears are manifested by Killingham, including the massive snake Jörmungandr, lightning, draugr, Fenrir, ghost, and Níðhöggr. In the panic, the three Holy Knights lead several sleepwalking Giant children away, but Saul and Robin try to rescue them; Dorry, Brogy, and Gaban join the fight against the nightmares. Sommers learns Gunko is afraid of Nika.
113	The Birth of Loki; Roki Tanjō (ロキ誕生)	November 4, 2025; 978-4-08-884738-2	November 10, 2026; 978-1-9747-6670-3
1145. "Wildfire in Forest Sector 2, Branch Route 8" (樹道8号線第2樹林区火災, "Judō Hachi-gōsen Daini Jurin-ku Kasai"); 1146. "Motion in Stillness" (静中に動あり, "Seichū ni Dō Ari"); 1147. "What We're Afraid Of" (我々の恐いもの, "Wareware no Kowai Mono"); 1148. "Ronja" (ローニャ, "Rōnya"); 1149. "One Second" (一秒, "Ichibyō"); 1150. "Domi Reversi" (黒転支配, "Domi Ribāshi"); 1151. "I Get the Idea!!!" (もういいわかった!!!, "Mō Ii Wakatta!!!"); 1152. "A Horrible Day" (ヒドい一日, "Hidoi Ichinichi"); 1153. "The Birth of Loki" (ロキ誕生, "Roki Tanjō"); 1154. "Can't Even Die" (死ねもしねェ, "Shine mo Shinē"); 1155. "The Rocks Pirates" (ロックス海賊団, "Rokkusu Kaizoku-dan")
Giant children were taken hostage to ensure the Giants' allegiance to Marijoa in an upcoming war. Brook realizes Gunko is a Holy Knight, who share the same regenerative powers as the Five Elders, and remembers his child. After the defenders of Elbaph are defeated, St Sommers names the ten hostage children and directs the Giants to burn the Owl Library; Gaban and Robin jump into action and Gaban defeats Sommers, but surrenders to Gunko when she threatens his son Collun. Impatient with the pace on Elbaph, Imu intervenes, possessing Gunko's body from Marijoa; Imu/Gunko casts the domi reversi spell on Dorry and Brogy, transforming them into undying winged demons who attack Jarul. When Gaban lands in the underworld, he advises Luffy to use Color of the Supreme King haki to defeat the Holy Knights. Loki explains the events of 14 years ago, when he, Shanks, and Chief Jarul found a demon-flipped King Harald at Aurust Castle. 109 years ago, immature Harald was a terrible king until he met Ida, a Giant who convinced him to begin diplomatic relations with humans. However, despite being the mother of Hajrudin, Ida's line was insufficiently noble for the king and he was married to prejudiced Estrid instead; she gave birth to Loki during one of Harald's journeys, but immediately cast him into the underworld for his demonic face; although he survived, Elbaph's misfortunes were blamed on "Loki's Curse", including a prophecy that Loki would kill Harald. Harald returns, saving Elbaph from famine with food from human friends. After he leaves again, unloved Loki runs wild; he jumps into the underworld and meets Rocks D. Xebec, the father of Blackbeard, who is seeking Harald. The year before, Rocks raided the Reverie, earning undying infamy and helping Harald escape. Rocks assembled his crew through Davy Back fights; his deeds include killing an Admiral, hijacking a Marijoa tribute ship, and destroying the Gates of Justice. Rocks persuades Harald to return swiftly by injuring the defiant Loki and unsuccessfully asks for Harald's help to capture Fullalead as a first step to becoming King of the World; four years later, he succeeds with his powerful crew, and Loki finally finds a purpose in Rocks' ambition.
114	The God Valley Incident; Goddo Barē Jiken (ゴッドバレー事件)	March 4, 2026; 978-4-08-885019-1	March 2, 2027; 978-1-9747-7159-2
1156. "Idols" (アイドル, "Aidoru"); 1157. "Legendary Bar" (伝説のBAR, "Densetsu no Bā"); 1158. "Rocks vs. Harald" (ロックスvs.ハラルド, "Rokkusu Bāsasu Hararudo"); 1159. "The Island of Fate" (運命の島, "Unmei no Shima"); 1160. "The God Valley Incident" (ゴッドバレー事件, "Goddo Barē Jiken"); 1161. "A Song of Love Bound Under a Hail of Arrows" (矢の雨をしのいで結ぶ恋の詩, "Ya no Ame o Shinoide Musubu Koi no Uta"); 1162. "God Valley Battle Royale" (G・V・B・R, "Goddo Barē Batoru Rowaiyaru"); 1163. "Promise" (約束, "Yakusoku"); 1164. "Davy Blood" (デービーの血, "Dēbī no Chi"); 1165. "Reverberations" (残響, "Zankyō"); 1166. "New Stories" (新しい物語, "Atarashii Monogatari")
All the Kuja Pirates had overwhelming beauty, but their captain, Gloriosa, was outshone by Shakuyaku, her first mate and eventual successor; they are entwined with the Roger Pirates as Gloriosa loved Roger, but he loved Shakky and she loved Rayleigh. Shakky gives up the throne and starts her Rip-Off Bar on Fullalead with comically inflated prices, taking advantage of Rocks' protection, and when he becomes immune to her charms, she realizes he has become a father. The Rocks Pirates continue to harass the World Government and the Five Elders propose that Elbaph may join if Harald kills Rocks. On Elbaph, Loki grows close to Ida; after Rocks tries to convince Harald the World Government has ulterior motives, they argue and split for good. At around the same time, St Garling recommends the next triennial Celestial Dragon Manhunt be held on God Valley, where he fathered twin sons Shanks and Shamrock with a red-haired woman named Magnolia. One year later, Shakky is abducted and the World Government announces the God Valley manhunt: Shakky is the grand prize, setting the Rocks and Rogers pirates on a collision course with Garling, the Holy Knights, Garp, and the Marines. Rocks' real name is Davy D. Xebec; he is a descendant of Davy D. Jones and the World Government has been hunting their family for centuries, so he tried to hide his wife Eris and his child Teach in his homeland – God Valley, where both Garp and his son, Marine rookie Monkey D. Dragon, are shocked to discover the civilian massacre. During the chaos, Garling stabs Magnolia; dying, she asks Dragon to rescue Shanks and Shamrock. He mutinies to escape, kills a Celestial Dragon, but ultimately loses both infants: Shamrock is taken by Holy Knight of God St Satchels Maffey and Shanks crawls into a treasure chest taken by Roger's crew. Rayleigh retrieves Shakky, who pummeled her captors even while shackled. Rocks fights Garling to give Eris time to run away with Teech; they escape via Kuma's Hands of Liberation. Imu possesses Saturn and gloats that killing Rocks will end the Davy line, stretching back to Joyboy, but an unbowed Rocks continues to resist alongside a team of unlikely allies. However, Imu uses Domi Reversi to control Rocks, who defeats all save Garp and Roger; they subdue him together with Color of the Supreme King Haki attacks and Garling eventually kills him. Saturn/Imu sails away, vowing to bury the history of God Valley. Aboard Gold Oro, Shakky's liberation party is interrupted by stowaway infant Shanks. At Marineford, Garp rages over the false reporting of his daring feats and he frees Dragon, imprisoned there for mutiny. Loki mourns the death of Rocks and Harald returns to Elbaph to acknowledge both Loki and Hajrudin as his sons; at Navy HQ, he tears off his horns and apologizes for the Giants, volunteering as a slave to prove his peaceful intent.
115	The Strongest Thing in the World; Sekai de Ichiban Tsuyoi Mono (せかいで1ばんつよいもの)	July 3, 2026; 978-4-08-885130-3	—
1167. "Ida's Sons" (イーダの息子, "Īda no Musuko"); 1168. "The Snows of Elbaph" (エルバフの雪, "Erubafu no Yuki"); 1169. "My Death Cannot Come Soon Enough" (一刻も早く死ななくては, "Ikkoku mo Hayaku Shinanakute wa"); 1170. "Contrary" (裏腹, "Urahara"); 1171. "Ragnir" (鉄雷, "Raguniru"); 1172. "The Elbaph I Dreamed Of" (おれの憧れたエルバフ, "Ore no Akogareta Erubafu"); 1173. "Warrior Generation" (戦士の世代, "Senshi no Sedai"); 1174. "The Strongest Thing in the World" (せかいで1ばんつよいもの, "Sekai de Ichiban Tsuyoi Mono"); 1175. "Niddhoggr" (雷竜, "Nīzuhoggu"); 1176. "With Pride" (誇り高く, "Hokori Tataku"); 1177. "Furious" (怒り, "Ikari"); 1178. "Waking From a Nightmare" (醒めてゆく悪夢, "Sameteyuku Akumu"); 1179. "Nerona Imu Descends" (ネロナ・イム降臨, "Nerona Imu Kōrin")
Five years later, Harald is inducted into the Holy Knights of God with a promise that Elbaph will join the World Government provided he continues faithful service. 18 years after that, Ida is poisoned by the elders of Brewers Village and dies; Loki lays waste to the town, calling her his only mother. A year later (14 years ago), Harald is promoted to Undying Knight, gaining strength and regeneration but also leashing him to Imu's absolute control; after he is possessed, Harald summons Jarul and Loki to Aurust and saves Elbaph from enslavement by asking them to kill him. Harald also commands Loki to eat the Devil Fruit treasure of Elbaph. Shanks and Gaban arrive to help Jarul delay Harald/Imu; Gaban explains that Color of Supreme King Haki slows down the regeneration. Loki stuns the living hammer/squrrel guardian Ragnir and eats the treasure; Harald asks him to lead Elbaph into a peaceful future, thanks him for honoring Ida, and says he loves Loki as the prince kills the king. Imu rages at losing an Ancient Giant slave and reminds the Elders that "Elbaph is D". Loki swears the witnesses to secrecy and sails away to avenge his father. Returning to the present, Hajrudin releases Loki to fight for Elbaph. Scopper debriefs Sanji and Chopper as they ascend to the Sun World, yet they are stunned to see demonic Dorry and Brogy attack Chief Jarul. Meanwhile, on Branch Route 8, Brook asks if Gunko/Imu is the patricidal Princess Shuri, causing Imu's control to waver and the binding arrows go slack, freeing the Straw Hats. At the Western Village, Gerd, Goldberg, and Rodo finish off a nightmare Nika, crushing the ship ready to take away the children. Sommers is crestfallen but cheers up when he realizes now the parents and siblings will watch the children fall to their deaths; instead, they choose to hug the children close and plummet together. However, they land on giant Gear Five/Nika Luffy's inflated tummy, who is riding on Loki's back, as the Giant prince's Devil Fruit transformation is the enormous black dragon Nidhoggr. After the children are safe, the Straw Hats fight back: Luffy disintegrates Sommers with Supreme King Haki, releasing the vines binding the children. Jimbe and Franky, powered by Super Vega Cola, tear the head off Killingham's dream lindworm, and Sanji squashes Killingham's head. Dorry and Brogy discover by killing each other that Domi Reversi is removed by mortal wounds; Zoro and the remaining Giants are elated to slay the rest of Imu's demons. In Monster Point form, Chopper slaps the demon out of a possessed Giant. Most of the Straw Hats admire Loki's massive Nidhoggr body and power, but Nami berates Luffy for befriending yet another "weirdo". Luffy and Loki finally reach Gunko/Imu, who claims their battle will cleave the world into two. Both Luffy and Loki resist Domi Reversi, and after Luffy batters Imu's shadow and Loki freezes it with Ragnir, Imu withdraws. As Elbaph recovers from the nightmare invasion, Chopper cures possessed Giants, Saul and Robin discover the Owl Library emptied, and Sommers begins regenerating. At Mariejois, Imu announces he will journey to Elbaph in person, declaring that Rocks, Roger, Luffy, Nika, Davy Jones, and the Will of D are all connected. While Garling manages the besieged Holy Land and York works on the Mother Flame, black lightning descends upon Elbaph as Imu arrives through a magic circle above Aurust Castle. Shedding the shadow disguise, Imu reveals their true identity as Saint Nerona Imu, the King of the World, leader and founder of the World Government.
116	— — (—)	December 4, 2026; 978-4-08-885234-8	—

== Chapters not yet published in volume format ==
These chapters have yet to be published in a tankōbon volume. They were originally serialized in Japanese in issues of Weekly Shōnen Jump from April to November 2026.

1180. "Omen" (魔気, "Ōmen")
1181. "God and Devil" (神と悪魔, "Kami to Akuma")
1182. "Zaza" (ザザ)
1183. "Good Morn-Maid" (グッドモー人魚, "Guddo Mōningyo")
1184. "We're All Bones When We Die" (みんな死んだら骨だけ, "Minna Shindara Hone Dake")
1185. "Mindja Own Beeswax" (ほっときなはれ, "Hottokinahare")
1186. "One More Time" (もう一度, "Mō Ichido")
1187. "The Root of the Problem" (元凶, "Genkyō")
1188. "Vohu" (虚無, "Bōfū")
1189. "King of the World" (世界の王, "Sekai no Ō")
1190. "Those Whose Death Brings Celebration" (死んで喜ばれる者, "Shinde Yorokobareru Mono")
1191. "There's Still Loki" (ロキがいる, "Roki ga Iru")
1192. "We Won't Stand For It!!!" (おれ達が許さねェ!!!, "Ore-tachi ga Yurusanē!!!")
1193. "Still Practicing" (練習中, "Renshū-chū")
1194. "All Things Are In Flux" (万物は変わりゆく, "Banbutsu wa Kawariyuku")
1195. "Weakness" (弱点, "Jakuten")
1196. "The Love of the Suicidal is Worthless" (死にたがりの愛に価値なんてない, "Shinitagari no Ai ni Kachi Nante Nai")
1197. "Love Is Defense" (愛とは防御力, "Ai to wa Bōgyoryoku")
1198. "Island of Monsters" (怪物達のいる島, "Kaibutsu-tachi no Iru Shima")
1199. "What the People Have Passed Down Through the Ages" (人々が語り継いだもの, "Hitobito ga Kataritsuida Mono")

== Lists of main series chapters ==
- List of One Piece chapters 1 to 186
- List of One Piece chapters 187 to 388
- List of One Piece chapters 389 to 594
- List of One Piece chapters 595 to 806
- List of One Piece chapters 807 to 1015

== See also ==
- List of One Piece media
