= List of One Piece episodes (seasons 9–14) =

Episodes 264-516 of One Piece

One Piece is an anime series adapted from the manga of the same title written by Eiichiro Oda. Produced by Toei Animation, and directed by Konosuke Uda, Munehisa Sakai, and Hiroaki Miyamoto, the ninth through the fourteenth seasons were broadcast on Fuji Television from May 21, 2006, to September 25, 2011. One Piece follows the adventures of Monkey D. Luffy, a 17-year-old young man, whose body has gained the properties of rubber from accidentally eating a supernatural fruit, and his crew of diverse pirates, named the Straw Hat Pirates. Luffy's greatest ambition is to obtain the ultimate treasure in the world, One Piece, and thereby become the next King of the Pirates. The series uses 51 different pieces of theme music: 29 opening themes and 22 closing themes. Several CDs that contain the theme music and other tracks have been released by Toei Animation. The first DVD compilation was released on February 21, 2001, with individual volumes releasing monthly. The Singaporean company Odex released part of the series locally in English and Japanese in the form of dual audio Video CDs.

The first unedited, bilingual DVD box set, containing 13 episodes, was released on May 27, 2008. Similarly sized sets followed with 31 sets released as of July 2015. Episodes began streaming on August 29, 2009. Funimation's uncut dub later resumed airing on Adult Swim's revived Toonami programming block from episode 207 onwards from May 2013 until it was removed from the schedule in March 2017 after episode 384. Toonami would eventually bring the series back in January 2022, starting on episode 517.

== Series overview ==
Season	Main arc title(s)	Episodes	Originally released	
Season	Main arc title(s)	Episodes	First released	Last released
1	East Blue	61	October 20, 1999	March 7, 2001
2	Entering into the Grand Line	16	March 21, 2001	August 19, 2001
3	Introducing Chopper at Drum Kingdom	15	August 26, 2001	December 9, 2001
4	Alabasta	38	December 16, 2001	October 27, 2002
5	TV Original	13	November 3, 2002	February 2, 2003
6	Skypiea	52	February 9, 2003	June 13, 2004
7	Escape! The Naval Fortress & The Foxy Pirate Crew	33	June 20, 2004	March 27, 2005
8	Water Seven	35	April 17, 2005	April 30, 2006
9	Enies Lobby	73	May 21, 2006	December 23, 2007
10	Thriller Bark	45	January 6, 2008	December 14, 2008
11	Sabaody Archipelago	26	December 21, 2008	June 28, 2009
12	Amazon Lily	14	July 5, 2009	October 11, 2009
13	Impel Down	35	October 18, 2009	June 20, 2010
14	Marineford	60	June 27, 2010	September 25, 2011
15	Fish-Man Island	62	October 2, 2011	December 23, 2012
16	Punk Hazard	50	January 6, 2013	January 12, 2014
17	Dressrosa	118	January 19, 2014	June 19, 2016
18	Zou	36	June 26, 2016	April 2, 2017
19	Whole Cake Island	109	April 9, 2017	June 30, 2019
20	Wano Country	197	July 7, 2019	December 17, 2023
21	Egghead	67	January 7, 2024	December 28, 2025
22	Elbaph	25	April 5, 2026	TBA

== Episodes ==
=== Season 9: Enies Lobby (2006–07) ===
No. overall (Note: Episode number by Toei Animation's count)	No. in season	Title (Note: Title of the episode: literally translated, romanized using Hepburn romanization, and in kanji form)	Directed by	Written by	Original release date (Note: Date the episode originally aired on Fuji Television)	English air date (Note: Episodes were initially released in English on DVD, but to correspond with the Japanese column, the air dates refer to their first English television airings on Adult Swim's Toonami programming block. For information on DVD releases, please refer to the "Home Releases" section of this page.)
Enies Lobby
264	1	"Landing Operations Start! Charge in, Straw Hats!"; Transliteration: "Jōriku Sakusen Shidō! Mugiwara Ichimi Totsunyū seyo!" (Japanese: 上陸作戦始動! 麦わら一味突入せよ!)	Munehisa Sakai	Hirohiko Kamisaka	May 21, 2006	July 27, 2014
265	2	"Luffy Cuts Through! Big Showdown on the Judicial Island!"; Transliteration: "Rufi Kai Shingeki! Shihō no Shima de Dai Kessen!" (Japanese: ルフィ快進撃! 司法の島で大決戦!!)	Hiroyuki Kakudō	Hirohiko Kamisaka	June 4, 2006	August 3, 2014
266	3	"Battle Against Giants! Open the Second Gate!"; Transliteration: "Kyojinzoku to no Kōbō! Dai Ni no Mon o Akero!" (Japanese: 巨人族との攻防! 第2の門を開けろ!)	Yoko Ikeda	Hirohiko Kamisaka	June 11, 2006	August 10, 2014
267	4	"Find a Way Out! Rocketman Takes Flight!"; Transliteration: "Katsuro o Hirake! Sora o Tobu Rokettoman!" (Japanese: 活路を開け! 空を飛ぶロケットマン!)	Yoshihiro Ueda	Hirohiko Kamisaka	June 18, 2006	August 17, 2014
268	5	"Catch Up with Luffy! The Straw Hats' All-Out Battle"; Transliteration: "Rufi ni Oitsuke! Mugiwara Ichimi Sōryokusen" (Japanese: ルフィに追いつけ! 麦わら一味総力戦)	Directed by : Hiroaki Miyamoto; Storyboarded by : Eisaku Inoue	Hirohiko Kamisaka	June 25, 2006 (Note: Episodes 268 and 269 aired together as a television special.)	August 24, 2014
269	6	"Robin Betrayed! The Motive of the World Government!"; Transliteration: "Uragira re ta Robin! Sekai Seifu no Omowaku!" (Japanese: 裏切られたロビン! 世界政府の思惑!)	Katsumi Tokoro	Hirohiko Kamisaka	June 25, 2006	September 7, 2014
270	7	"Give Robin Back! Luffy vs. Blueno!"; Transliteration: "Robin o Kaese! Rufi vs. Burūno!" (Japanese: ロビンを返せ! ルフィvsブルーノ!)	Takahiro Imamura	Hirohiko Kamisaka	July 2, 2006	September 14, 2014
271	8	"Don't Stop! Hoist the Counterattack Signal!"; Transliteration: "Tachidomaru na! Hangeki no Noroshi o Agero!" (Japanese: 立ち止まるな! 反撃の狼煙を上げろ!)	Yoshihiro Ueda	Hirohiko Kamisaka	July 9, 2006	September 21, 2014
272	9	"Almost to Luffy! Gather at the Courthouse Plaza!"; Transliteration: "Rufi Mokuzen! Saibanshomae Hiroba e Shūketsu se yo" (Japanese: ルフィ目前! 裁判所前広場へ集結せよ)	Hiroyuki Kakudō	Hirohiko Kamisaka	July 23, 2006	September 28, 2014
273	10	"Everything is to Protect My Friends! Second Gear Activated!"; Transliteration: "Subete wa Nakama o Mamoru Tame ni! Gia Sekando Hatsudō" (Japanese: 全ては仲間を守る為に! ギア2発動!)	Munehisa Sakai	Hirohiko Kamisaka	July 30, 2006	October 5, 2014
274	11	"Give us Your Answer, Robin! The Straw Hats' Outcry!"; Transliteration: "Kotaero Robin! Mugiwara Ichimi no Sakebi!!" (Japanese: 答えろロビン! 麦わら一味の叫び!!)	Yoko Ikeda	Hirohiko Kamisaka	August 6, 2006	October 12, 2014
275	12	"Robin's Past! The Girl Who was Called a Devil!"; Transliteration: "Robin no Kako! Akuma to Yoba re ta Shōjo!" (Japanese: ロビンの過去! 悪魔と呼ばれた少女!)	Hiroaki Miyamoto	Hirohiko Kamisaka	August 13, 2006	October 19, 2014
276	13	"Fated Mother and Daughter! The Mother's Name is Olvia!"; Transliteration: "Shukumei no Oyako! Sono Haha no Na wa Orubia!" (Japanese: 宿命の母娘! その母の名はオルビア!)	Directed by : Toru Yamada; Storyboarded by : Eisaku Inoue	Hirohiko Kamisaka	September 10, 2006	October 26, 2014
277	14	"The Tragedy of Ohara! The Terror of the Buster Call!"; Transliteration: "Ohara no Higeki! Basutā Kōru no Kyōfu" (Japanese: オハラの悲劇! バスターコールの恐怖)	Takahiro Imamura	Hirohiko Kamisaka	September 24, 2006 (Note: Episodes 277 and 278 aired as part of a television special alongside episodes of Sazae-san and Kochikame.)	November 2, 2014
278	15	"Say You Want to Live! We Are Your Friends!!"; Transliteration: "Ikitai to Ie! Oretachi wa Nakama da!!" (Japanese: 生きたいと言え! オレ達は仲間だ!!)	Yoshihiro Ueda	Hirohiko Kamisaka	September 24, 2006	November 9, 2014
Straw Hat Theater & The Straw Hat Pirate Crew
279	16	"Jump Towards the Falls! Luffy's Feelings!"; Transliteration: "Taki ni Mukatte Tobe! Rufi no Omoi!!" (Japanese: 滝に向かって飛べ! ルフィの想い!!)	Munehisa Sakai	N/A	October 1, 2006	November 16, 2014
EX–1	EX–1	"Straw Hat Theatre #1: Chopper Man"; Transliteration: "Mugiwara Gekijō Sono Ichi: Chopper Man" (Japanese: 麦わら劇場その1「Chopper Man」)	N/A	N/A	October 1, 2006 (Note: Though listed separately on the DVD release, the omake shorts aired as part of the episodes preceding them in the table, filling the last three minutes of the series' timeslot.)	November 16, 2014
280	17	"The Ways of Men! Zoro's Techniques, Usopp's Dream!"; Transliteration: "Otoko no Ikisama! Zoro no Waza Usoppu no Yume" (Japanese: 男の生き様! ゾロの業·ウソップの夢)	Munehisa Sakai & Yoko Ikeda	N/A	October 8, 2006	November 23, 2014
EX–2	EX–2	"Straw Hat Theatre #2: Report Time"; Transliteration: "Mugiwara Gekijō Sono Ni: Report Time" (Japanese: 麦わら劇場その2「Report Time」)	N/A	N/A	October 8, 2006	November 23, 2014
281	18	"A Bond of Friendship Woven by Tears! Nami's World Map!"; Transliteration: "Namida ga Tsumui da Nakama no Kizuna! Nami no Sekai Chizu" (Japanese: 涙が紡いだ仲間の絆! ナミの世界地図)	Munehisa Sakai & Yoko Ikeda	N/A	October 15, 2006	November 30, 2014
EX–3	EX–3	"Straw Hat Theatre #3: Obahan Time"; Transliteration: "Mugiwara Gekijō Sono San: Obahan Time" (Japanese: 麦わら劇場その3「Obahan Time」)	N/A	N/A	October 15, 2006	November 30, 2014
282	19	"Parting Builds a Man's Character! Sanji and Chopper!"; Transliteration: "Wakare ga Otoko o Migaku! Sanji to Choppā" (Japanese: 別れが男を磨く! サンジとチョッパー)	Munehisa Sakai & Yoko Ikeda	N/A	October 22, 2006	January 4, 2015
EX–4	EX–4	"Straw Hat Theatre #4: No Respect Time"; Transliteration: "Mugiwara Gekijō Sono Yon: Jingi Nai Time" (Japanese: 麦わら劇場その4「仁義ないTime」)	N/A	N/A	October 22, 2006	January 4, 2015
283	20	"Everything is for Her Friends! Robin in the Darkness!"; Transliteration: "Subete wa Nakama no Tame ni! Yami no Naka no Robin!" (Japanese: 全ては仲間の為に! 闇の中のロビン!)	Munehisa Sakai & Yoko Ikeda	N/A	October 29, 2006	January 11, 2015
EX–5	EX–5	"Straw Hat Theatre #5: Monster Time"; Transliteration: "Mugiwara Gekijō Sono Go Monster Time" (Japanese: 麦わら劇場その5「Monster Time」)	N/A	N/A	October 29, 2006	January 11, 2015
Enies Lobby
284	21	"I'm Not Gonna Hand Over the Blueprints! Franky's Decision!"; Transliteration: "Sekkeizu wa Watasanai! Furankī no Ketsudan" (Japanese: 設計図は渡さない! フランキーの決断)	Hiroyuki Kakudō	Hirohiko Kamisaka	November 5, 2006	January 18, 2015
285	22	"Obtain the 5 Keys! The Straw Hat Pirates vs. CP9!"; Transliteration: "Itsutsu no Kage o Ubae! Mugiwara Ichimi Tai CP9" (Japanese: 5つの鍵を奪え! 麦わら一味対CP9)	Takahiro Imamura	Koga Naoki	November 12, 2006	January 25, 2015
286	23	"Devil Fruit Powers! Kaku and Jabra Transform!"; Transliteration: "Akuma no Mi no Chikara! Kaku to Jabura Daihenshin" (Japanese: 悪魔の実の力! カクとジャブラ大変身)	Yoshihiro Ueda	Hirohiko Kamisaka	November 19, 2006	February 1, 2015
287	24	"I Won't Kick Even If It Costs Me My Life! Sanji's Chivalry!"; Transliteration: "Shin demo Keran! Sanji Otoko no Kishidō" (Japanese: 死んでも蹴らん! サンジ男の騎士道!)	Hiroaki Miyamoto	Yoshiyuki Suga	November 26, 2006	February 8, 2015
288	25	"Fukurou's Miscalculation! My Cola is the Water of Life!"; Transliteration: "Fukurō no Gosan! Ore no Kōra wa Inochi no Mizu" (Japanese: フクロウの誤算! 俺のコーラは命の水)	Yoko Ikeda	Koga Naoki	December 3, 2006	February 15, 2015
289	26	"Zoro Busts Out a New Technique! The Sword's Name is Sniperking?"; Transliteration: "Zoro Shinwaza Sakuretsu! Katana no Na wa Sogekingu?" (Japanese: ゾロ新技炸裂! 刀の名はそげキング?)	Hiroyuki Kakudō	Yoshiyuki Suga	December 10, 2006	February 22, 2015
290	27	"Uncontrollable! Chopper's Forbidden Rumble!"; Transliteration: "Seigyo Funō! Choppā Kindan no Ranburu!" (Japanese: 制御不能! チョッパー禁断のランブル)	Yoshihiro Ueda	Koga Naoki	December 17, 2006	March 1, 2015
Boss Luffy Historical Special
291	28	"Boss Luffy Returns! Is It a Dream or Reality? Lottery Ruckus!"; Transliteration: "Rufi Oyabun Futatabi! Yume ga Aware ka Tomikuji Zōdō" (Japanese: ルフィ親分再び! 夢か現か富くじ騒動)	Munehisa Sakai	Yoshiyuki Suga	December 24, 2006	March 8, 2015
292	29	"A Big Rice Cake Tossing Race at the Castle! Red Nose's Plot!"; Transliteration: "Oshiro de Mochi Maki Dai Rēsu! Akai Hana no Inbō" (Japanese: お城で餅まき大レース! 赤い鼻の陰謀)	Yoko Ikeda	Koga Naoki	January 7, 2007	March 15, 2015
Enies Lobby
293	30	"Bubble Master Kalifa! The Soap Trap Closes in on Nami!"; Transliteration: "Awatsukai Karifa! Nami ni Hakaru Sekken no Wana" (Japanese: 泡使いカリファ! ナミに迫る石鹸の罠)	Hiroaki Miyamoto	Yoshiyuki Suga	January 14, 2007	March 22, 2015
294	31	"Resounding Bad News! Buster Call Invoked!"; Transliteration: "Hibikiwataru Kyōhō! Hatsudō Basutā Kōru!" (Japanese: 響き渡る凶報! 発動バスターコール!)	Hiroyuki Kakudō	Koga Naoki	January 21, 2007	March 29, 2015
295	32	"Five Namis? Nami Strikes Back With Mirages!"; Transliteration: "Gonin no Nami? Hangeki wa Shinkirō to Tomo ni!" (Japanese: 5人のナミ? 反撃は蜃気楼とともに!)	Yoshihiro Ueda	Yoshiyuki Suga	January 28, 2007	April 5, 2015
296	33	"Nami's Decision! Fire at the Out-Of-Control Chopper!"; Transliteration: "Nami no Ketsudan! Bōsō Choppā o Ute!" (Japanese: ナミの決断! 暴走チョッパーを撃て!)	Masahiro Hosoda	Koga Naoki	February 4, 2007	April 12, 2015
297	34	"Hunter Sanji Makes An Entrance? Elegy for a Lying Wolf!"; Transliteration: "Garibito Sanji Tōjō? Usotsuki Ōkami ni Okuru Banka" (Japanese: 狩人サンジ登場!? 嘘つき狼に贈る挽歌)	Katsumi Tokoro	Yoshiyuki Suga	February 11, 2007	April 19, 2015
298	35	"Fiery Kicks! Sanji's Full Course of Foot Techniques!"; Transliteration: "Shakunetsu no Keri! Sanji Ashiwaza no Furukōsu" (Japanese: 灼熱の蹴り! サンジ足技のフルコース)	Hiroyuki Kakudō	Koga Naoki	February 25, 2007	April 26, 2015
299	36	"Fierce Sword Attacks! Zoro vs. Kaku, Powerful Sword Fighting Showdown!"; Transliteration: "Hakujin no Mōgeki! Zoro Tai Kaku Kyōryoku Sangeki Taiketsu" (Japanese: 白刃の猛襲! ゾロ対カク強力斬撃対決)	Hiroaki Miyamoto	Yoshiyuki Suga	March 4, 2007	May 3, 2015
300	37	"Demon God Zoro! An Incarnation of Asura Born From Fighting Spirit!"; Transliteration: "Kishin Zoro! Kihaku ga Miseta Ashura no Keshin" (Japanese: 鬼神ゾロ! 気迫が見せた阿修羅の化身)	Yoko Ikeda	Koga Naoki	March 11, 2007	May 10, 2015
301	38	"Spandam Frightened! The Hero on the Tower of Law!"; Transliteration: "Spandamu Kyōgaku! Shihō no Tō ni Tatsu Eiyū" (Japanese: スパンダム驚愕! 司法の塔に立つ英雄)	Yoshihiro Ueda	Yoshiyuki Suga	March 18, 2007	May 17, 2015
302	39	"Robin Freed! Luffy vs. Lucci, Showdown Between Leaders!"; Transliteration: "Robin Kaihō! Rufi Tai Rutchi Chōjō Kessen" (Japanese: ロビン解放! ルフィ対ルッチ頂上決戦)	Directed by : Akira Shimizu; Storyboarded by : Seiji Okuda	Koga Naoki	March 25, 2007	May 31, 2015
Boss Luffy Historical Special
303	40	"Boss Luffy is the Culprit? Track Down the Missing Great Cherry Tree!"; Transliteration: "Hannin wa Rufi Oyabun? Kieta Ōzakura o Oe" (Japanese: 犯人はルフィ親分? 消えた大桜を追え)	Munehisa Sakai	Hirohiko Kamisaka	April 1, 2007	June 7, 2015
Enies Lobby
304	41	"I Can't Protect Anyone Unless I Win! Third Gear Activated!"; Transliteration: "Katenakya Dare mo Mamorenai! Gia Sado Shidō" (Japanese: 勝てなきゃ誰も守れない! ギア3始動)	Directed by : Makoto Sonoda; Storyboarded by : Naotoshi Shida	Yoshiyuki Suga	April 8, 2007	June 14, 2015
305	42	"Shivering Past! Dark Justice and Rob Lucci!"; Transliteration: "Senritsu no Kako! Yami no Seigi to Robu Rutchi" (Japanese: 戦慄の過去! 闇の正義とロブ·ルッチ)	Katsumi Tokoro	Koga Naoki	April 15, 2007	June 21, 2015
306	43	"A Mysterious Mermaid Appears? As Consciousness Fades Away..."; Transliteration: "Maboroshi no Ningyo Awareru? Usure Yuku Ishiki no Naka de" (Japanese: 幻の人魚現る? 薄れゆく意識のなかで)	Directed by : Keisuke Ōnishi; Storyboarded by : Yoshihiro Ueda	Yoshiyuki Suga	April 22, 2007	June 28, 2015
307	44	"Cannon Fire Sinks the Island! Franky's Lamentation!"; Transliteration: "Hōka ni Shizumu Shima! Furankī Munen no Sakebi" (Japanese: 砲火に沈む島! フランキー無念の叫び)	Hiroyuki Kakudō	Koga Naoki	April 29, 2007	July 12, 2015
308	45	"Wait for Luffy! Mortal Combat on the Bridge of Hesitation!"; Transliteration: "Rufi o Mate! Tamerai no Hashi no Shitō!" (Japanese: ルフィを待て! ためらいの橋の死闘!)	Directed by : Hiroyuki Satō; Storyboarded by : Akiko Fujisawa	Yoshiyuki Suga	May 6, 2007	July 19, 2015
309	46	"Fists Full of Emotion! Luffy Unleashes Gatling with All His Might!"; Transliteration: "Kobushi ni Kometa Omoi! Rufi Konshin no Gātoringu" (Japanese: 拳に込めた想い! ルフィ渾身の銃乱打)	Makoto Sonoda	Koga Naoki	May 13, 2007	July 26, 2015
310	47	"From the Sea, a Friend Arrives! The Straw Hats Share the Strongest Bond!"; Transliteration: "Tomo, Umi Yori Kuru! Mugiwara Ichimi Saikyō no Kizuna" (Japanese: 友, 海より来る! 麦わら一味最強の絆)	Yoshihiro Ueda	Yoshiyuki Suga	May 20, 2007	August 2, 2015
311	48	"Everyone Makes a Great Escape! The Road to Victory is for the Pirates!"; Transliteration: "Zen'in Dai Dasshutsu! Shōsha no Michi wa Kaizoku no Tame ni" (Japanese: 全員大脱出! 勝者の道は海賊のために)	Directed by : Hiroyuki Satō; Storyboarded by : Eisaku Inoue	Koga Naoki	May 27, 2007	August 9, 2015
312	49	"Thank You, Merry! Snow Falls over the Parting Sea!"; Transliteration: "Arigatō Merī! Yuki ni Kemuru Wakare no Umi" (Japanese: ありがとうメリー! 雪に煙る別れの海)	Katsumi Tokoro	Yoshiyuki Suga	June 3, 2007	August 16, 2015
Return to Water Seven
313	50	"Peace Interrupted! A Navy Vice Admiral with a Fist of Love!"; Transliteration: "Yaburareta Ansoku! Ai no Kobushi o Motsu Kaigun Chūjō" (Japanese: 破られた安息! 愛の拳を持つ海軍中将)	Hiroaki Miyamoto	Koga Naoki	June 10, 2007	August 23, 2015
314	51	"The Strongest Family? Luffy's Father Revealed!"; Transliteration: "Saikyō no Kakei? Akasareta Rufi no Chichi!" (Japanese: 最強の家系? 明かされたルフィの父!)	Hiroyuki Kakudō	Yoshiyuki Suga	June 17, 2007	August 30, 2015
315	52	"Its Name Is The New World! The Fate of the Grand Line!"; Transliteration: "Sono Na wa Shin Sekai! Gurando Rain no Yukue" (Japanese: その名は新世界! 偉大なる航路の行方)	Yoko Ikeda	Koga Naoki	June 24, 2007	September 13, 2015
316	53	"Shanks Makes a Move! The Linchpin to the Reckless Era!"; Transliteration: "Shankusu Ugoku! Bōsōsuru Jidai e no Kusabi" (Japanese: シャンクス動く! 暴走する時代への楔)	Takahiro Imamura	Hirohiko Kamisaka	July 1, 2007	September 20, 2015
317	54	"The Girl in Search of Her Yagara! Great Search in the City of Water!"; Transliteration: "Yagara o Sagasu Shōjo! Mizu no Miyako Daisōsasen!" (Japanese: ヤガラを探す少女! 水の都大捜査線!)	Yoshihiro Ueda	Hirohiko Kamisaka	July 8, 2007	September 27, 2015
318	55	"Mothers are Strong! Zoro's Hectic Household Chores!"; Transliteration: "Haha wa Tsuyoshi! Zoro no Dotabata Kaji Tetsudai" (Japanese: 母は強し! ゾロのドタバタ家事手伝い)	Directed by : Keisuke Ōnishi; Storyboarded by : Naotoshi Shida	Koga Naoki	July 15, 2007	October 4, 2015
319	56	"Sanji's Shock! Mysterious Old Man and His Super Yummy Cooking!"; Transliteration: "Sanji Shōgeki! Nazo no Jii-san to Hageuma Ryōri" (Japanese: サンジ衝撃! 謎の爺さんと激ウマ料理)	Makoto Sonoda	Yoshiyuki Suga	July 22, 2007	October 11, 2015
320	57	"Everyone Finally Has A Bounty! A Pirate Group Worth Over Six Hundred Million!"; Transliteration: "Tsui ni Zen'in Shōkinkubi! Rokuoku Koe no Ichimi!" (Japanese: ついに全員賞金首! 6億超えの一味!)	Hiroyuki Kakudō	Yoshiyuki Suga	August 19, 2007	October 18, 2015
321	58	"The King of Animals that Overlooks the Sea! The Dream Ship Magnificently Completed!"; Transliteration: "Umi o Nozomu Hyakujū no Ō! Yume no Fune Dōdō Kansei!" (Japanese: 海を臨む百獣の王! 夢の船堂々完成!)	Naoyuki Itō	Hirohiko Kamisaka	August 26, 2007	October 25, 2015
322	59	"Goodbye My Dear Underlings! Franky Departs!"; Transliteration: "Saraba Itoshiki Kobun-tachi! Furankī Tatsu" (Japanese: さらば愛しき子分達! フランキー発つ)	Yoshihiro Ueda	Yoshiyuki Suga	September 2, 2007	November 8, 2015
323	60	"Departing the City of Water! Usopp Mans Up and Brings Closure to the Duel!"; Transliteration: "Shukkō Mizu no Miyako! Otoko Usoppu Kettō no Kejime" (Japanese: 出港水の都! 男ウソップ決闘のケジメ)	Katsumi Tokoro	Yoshiyuki Suga	September 9, 2007	November 15, 2015
324	61	"Wanted Posters Make It Around the World! Celebrations in Their Hometowns as the Ship Moves Forward!"; Transliteration: "Meguru Tehaisho! Kokyō wa Odoru Fune wa Susumu!" (Japanese: めぐる手配書! 故郷は踊る 船は進む!)	Tetsuya Endō	Koga Naoki	September 16, 2007	November 22, 2015
325	62	"The Most Heinous Power! Blackbeard's Darkness Attacks Ace!"; Transliteration: "Saikyō no Nōryoku! Ēsu o Osou Kurohige no Yami" (Japanese: 最凶の能力! エースを襲う黒ひげの闇)	Yoko Ikeda	Hirohiko Kamisaka	September 23, 2007	December 6, 2015
Ice Hunter
326	63	"The Mysterious Band of Pirates! Sunny and the Dangerous Trap!"; Transliteration: "Nazo no Kaizoku Go Ichigyō! Sanī-gō to Kikken na Wana" (Japanese: 謎の海賊ご一行!サニー号と危険な罠)	Munehisa Sakai	Hirohiko Kamisaka	October 14, 2007	December 13, 2015
327	64	"Sunny in a Pinch! Roar, Secret Superspeed Mecha!"; Transliteration: "Sanī-gō Pinchi! Unare Chōsoku no Himitsu Meka" (Japanese: サニー号ピンチ!唸れ超速の秘密メカ)	Hiroaki Miyamoto	Yoshiyuki Suga	October 21, 2007	January 3, 2016
328	65	"The Dream Sinking in the New World! The Disillusioned Pirate, Puzzle!"; Transliteration: "Shinsekai ni Shizumu Yume! Shitsui no Kaizoku Pazūru" (Japanese: 新世界に沈む夢!失意の海賊パズール)	Takahiro Imamura	Koga Naoki	October 28, 2007	January 10, 2016
329	66	"The Assassins Attack! The Great Battle on Ice Begins!"; Transliteration: "Osoi Kuru Shikaku-tachi! Kōri Ue Daibatoru Kaishi" (Japanese: 襲い来る刺客たち!氷上大バトル開始)	Directed by : Hiroyuki Satō; Storyboarded by : Naotoshi Shida	Takuya Masumoto	November 4, 2007	January 17, 2016
330	67	"The Straw Hat's Hard Battles! A Pirate Soul Risking It All for the Flag!"; Transliteration: "Taikusen Mugiwara Ichimi! Hata ni Kakeru Kaizokudamashī" (Japanese: 大苦戦麦わら一味!旗にかける海賊魂)	Sumio Watanabe	Tsuyoshi Sakurai	November 11, 2007	January 24, 2016
331	68	"Hot Full Throttle! The Twin's Magnetic Power Drawing Near!"; Transliteration: "Atsukurushisa Zenkai! Semaru Futago no Jiryoku Pawā" (Japanese: 暑苦しさ全開! 迫る双子の磁力パワー)	Directed by : Hiroyuki Satō; Storyboarded by : Makoto Sonoda	Isao Murayama	November 18, 2007	January 31, 2016
332	69	"Mansion of Great Chaos! The Enraged Don and the Captured Crew!"; Transliteration: "Daikōran no Kan! Ikaru Don to Toraware no Ichimi" (Japanese: 大混乱の館! 怒るドンと囚われの一味)	Katsumi Tokoro	Yōichi Takahashi	November 25, 2007	February 7, 2016
333	70	"The Return of the Phoenix! The Dream of the Pirate Flag Sworn to a Friend!"; Transliteration: "Fushichō Futatabi! Tomo ni Chikau Kaizokuki no Yume" (Japanese: 不死鳥ふたたび! 友に誓う海賊旗の夢)	Tetsuya Endō	Yoshiyuki Suga	December 2, 2007	February 14, 2016
334	71	"The Red Hot Decisive Battle! Luffy vs. The Scorching Don!"; Transliteration: "Atsu Atsu Chōkessen! Rufi vs. Shakuretsu no Don" (Japanese: アツアツ超決戦! ルフィvs灼熱のドン)	Directed by : Sumio Watanabe; Storyboarded by : Kenji Yokoyama	Yoshiyuki Suga	December 9, 2007	February 21, 2016
335	72	"Waiting in the New World! Farewell to the Brave Pirates!"; Transliteration: "Shinsekai de Matsu! Isamashiki Kaizoku to no Wakare" (Japanese: 新世界で待つ! 勇ましき海賊との別れ)	Hiroaki Miyamoto	Koga Naoki	December 16, 2007	February 28, 2016
336	73	"Chopperman to the Rescue! Protect the TV Station by the Shore!"; Transliteration: "Shutsudō Choppāman! Mamore Nagisa no Terebi Kyoku" (Japanese: 出動チョッパーマン！守れ渚のTV局)	Gō Koga	Takuya Masumoto	December 23, 2007	March 6, 2016

=== Season 10: Thriller Bark (2008) ===
No. overall	No. in season	Title	Directed by	Written by	Original release date	English air date
Thriller Bark
337	1	"The Mysterious Skeleton Floating Through The Fog! Venture into The Devil's Sea"; Transliteration: "Ma no Umi Totsunyū! Kiri ni Ukabu Nazo no Gaikotsu" (Japanese: 魔の海突入! 霧に浮かぶ謎のガイコツ)	Yoshihiro Ueda	Hirohiko Kamisaka	January 6, 2008	March 13, 2016
338	2	"The Joy of Seeing People! The Gentleman Skeleton’s True Identity!"; Transliteration: "Hito ni Aeta Yorokobi! Gaikotsu Shinshi no Shōtai" (Japanese: 人に逢えた喜び! ガイコツ紳士の正体)	Directed by : Hiroyuki Satō; Storyboarded by : Naotoshi Shida	Tsuyoshi Sakurai	January 13, 2008	March 20, 2016
339	3	"One Unnatural Phenomenon After the Next! Disembarking on Thriller Bark!"; Transliteration: "Kai Genshō Zokuzoku! Surirābāku Jōriku" (Japanese: 怪現象ぞくぞく! スリラーバーク上陸)	Sumio Watanabe	Takuya Masumoto	January 20, 2008	March 27, 2016
340	4	"The Man Called a Genius! Hogback Makes His Appearance!"; Transliteration: "Tensai to Yobareta Otoko! Hogubakku Arawaru!" (Japanese: 天才と呼ばれた男! ホグバック現る!)	Katsumi Tokoro	Yoshiyuki Suga	January 27, 2008	April 3, 2016
341	5	"Nami’s in a Major Pinch! The Zombie Mansion and the Invisible Man!"; Transliteration: "Nami Daipinchi! Zonbi Yashiki to Tōmei Ningen" (Japanese: ナミ大ピンチ! ゾンビ屋敷と透明人間)	Tetsuya Endō	Isao Murayama	February 3, 2008	April 10, 2016
342	6	"The Zombie’s Secret! Hogback’s Nightmarish Laboratory!"; Transliteration: "Zonbi no Nazo! Akumu no Hogubakku Kenkyūsho" (Japanese: ゾンビの謎! 悪夢のホグバック研究所)	Directed by : Hiroshi Matsuzaka; Storyboarded by : Kenji Yokoyama	Tsuyoshi Sakurai	February 10, 2008	April 17, 2016
343	7	"His Name is Moria! The Great Shadow-Seizing Pirate's Trap!"; Transliteration: "Sono Na wa Moria! Kage o Nigiru Daikaizoku no Wana" (Japanese: その名はモリア! 影を握る大海賊の罠)	Yoshihiro Ueda	Koga Naoki	February 17, 2008	April 24, 2016
344	8	"Feast of the Zombie Song! The Night Raid's Bell is the Sound of Darkness!"; Transliteration: "Zonbi Songu no Kyōen! Yōchi no Kane wa Yami no Oto" (Japanese: ゾンビ歌の饗宴! 夜討ちの鐘は闇の音)	Directed by : Hiroyuki Satō; Storyboarded by : Naotoshi Shida	Hirohiko Kamisaka	February 24, 2008	May 1, 2016
345	9	"A Bunch of Animals? Perona's Wonder Garden!"; Transliteration: "Dōbutsu Ippai? Perōna no Wandāgāden" (Japanese: 動物いっぱい? ペローナの不思議の庭)	Sumio Watanabe	Yoshiyuki Suga	March 2, 2008	May 8, 2016
346	10	"The Vanishing Straw Hat Crew! A Mysterious Swordsman Appears!"; Transliteration: "Kieru Mugiwara Ichimi! Arawareta Nazo no Kenshi!" (Japanese: 消える麦わら一味! 現れた謎の剣士!)	Katsumi Tokoro	Takuya Masumoto	March 9, 2008	May 15, 2016
347	11	"Chivalry Remains! The Traitorous Zombie Protects Nami!"; Transliteration: "Nokoru Kishidō! Nami o Mamoru Uragiri Zonbi" (Japanese: 残る騎士道! ナミを守る裏切りゾンビ)	Hiroaki Miyamoto	Koga Naoki	March 16, 2008	May 22, 2016
348	12	"Appearing from the Sky! That Man Is the Humming Swordsman!"; Transliteration: "Sora kara Sanjō! Kenkyō Hanauta wa Ano Otoko!" (Japanese: 空から参上! 剣狭ハナウタはあの男!)	Directed by : Hiroyuki Satō; Storyboarded by : Munehisa Sakai	Isao Murayama	March 23, 2008	June 5, 2016
349	13	"Luffy's Emergency Situation! The Ultimate Shadow's Destination!"; Transliteration: "Rufi Kinkyūjitai! Saikyō no Kage no Ikisaki!" (Japanese: ルフィ緊急事態! 最強の影の行き先!)	Yutaka Nakashima	Yoshiyuki Suga	March 30, 2008	June 12, 2016
350	14	"The Warrior Known As the "Devil"!! The Moment of Oars' Revival"; Transliteration: "Majin to Yobareta Senshi!! Ōzu Fukkatsu no Toki" (Japanese: 魔人と呼ばれた戦士!! オーズ復活の時)	Tetsuya Endō	Tsuyoshi Sakurai	April 20, 2008	June 19, 2016
351	15	"Awakening After 500 Years!! Oars Opens His Eyes!!"; Transliteration: "Gohyakunen Buri no Mezame!! Ōzu Kaigan!!" (Japanese: 500年ぶりの目覚め!! オーズ開眼!!)	Yoshihiro Ueda	Takuya Masumoto	April 27, 2008	June 26, 2016
352	16	"A Belief Worth Begging to Live for!! Brook Defends His Afro"; Transliteration: "Shinnen no Inochigoi!! Afuro o Mamoru Burukku" (Japanese: 信念の命乞い!! アフロを守るブルック)	Sumio Watanabe	Yoshiyuki Suga	May 4, 2008	July 10, 2016
353	17	"A Man's Promise Never Dies!! To the Friend Waiting Under the Distant Sky"; Transliteration: "Otoko no Chikai wa Shinazu!! Tōi Sora de Matsu Tomo e" (Japanese: 男の誓いは死なず!! 遠い空で待つ友へ)	Directed by : Hiroshi Matsuzaka; Storyboarded by : Naotoshi Shida	Hirohiko Kamisaka	May 11, 2008	July 17, 2016
354	18	"I Swear to Go See Him! Brook and the Cape of Promise"; Transliteration: "Kanarazu Ai ni Iku!! Burukku to Yakusoku no Misaki" (Japanese: 必ず会いに行く!! ブルックと約束の岬)	Takahiro Imamura	Hirohiko Kamisaka	May 18, 2008	July 24, 2016
355	19	"Food, Nami and Shadows!! Luffy's Enraged Counterattack"; Transliteration: "Meshi to Nami to Kage!! Luffi Ikari no Daihangeki" (Japanese: メシとナミと影!! ルフィ怒りの大反撃)	Katsumi Tokoro	Koga Naoki	May 25, 2008	July 31, 2016
356	20	"Usopp's the Strongest? Leave Anything Negative to Him"; Transliteration: "Usoppu Saikyō? Negateibu wa Makasetoke" (Japanese: ウソップ最強? ネガティブは任せとけ)	Yutaka Nakashima	Takuya Masumoto	June 1, 2008	August 7, 2016
357	21	"The General Zombies Are Down in a Flash!! Oars Feels Like an Adventure!!"; Transliteration: "Jeneraru Zonbi Shunsetsu!! Ōzu wa Bōken Kibun!!" (Japanese: 将軍ゾンビ瞬殺!! オーズは冒険気分!!)	Tetsuya Endō	Tsuyoshi Sakurai	June 8, 2008	August 14, 2016
358	22	"Blazing Knight Sanji!! Kick Down the Fake Wedding"; Transliteration: "Honō no Naito Sanji!! Keri Tsubuse Itsuwari no Kyoshiki" (Japanese: 炎の騎士サンジ!! 蹴り潰せ偽りの挙式)	Sumio Watanabe	Yoshiyuki Suga	June 15, 2008	August 21, 2016
359	23	"A Clear-Clear History? Sanji's Stolen Dream"; Transliteration: "Suke Suke no Innen? Ubawareta Sanji no Yume" (Japanese: スケスケの因縁? 奪われたサンジの夢)	Yoshihiro Ueda	Takuya Masumoto	June 22, 2008	August 28, 2016
360	24	"Save Me, Hero!! My Enemy Is the Immortal Princess"; Transliteration: "Tasukete Hīrō!! Teki wa Fujimi no Purinsesu" (Japanese: 助けて英雄!! 敵は不死身のプリンセス)	Directed by : Makoto Sonoda; Storyboarded by : Naotoshi Shida	Hirohiko Kamisaka	June 29, 2008	September 11, 2016
361	25	"Perona Is Terrified!! Usopp and Untruthful Share the Same "U""; Transliteration: "Perona Kyōfu!! Uso no U wa Usoppu no U" (Japanese: ペローナ恐怖!! 嘘のウはウソップのウ)	Tetsuya Endō	Koga Naoki	July 6, 2008	September 18, 2016
362	26	"Slashes Dancing On the Rooftop!! Showdown: Zoro vs. Ryuma!"; Transliteration: "Yane ni Mau Zangeki!! Ketchaku Zoro VS Ryūma" (Japanese: 屋根に舞う斬撃!! 決着ゾロVSリューマ)	Yoshihiro Ueda	Yoshiyuki Suga	July 13, 2008	September 25, 2016
363	27	"Chopper Is Furious!! Hogback's Evil Medical Practices"; Transliteration: "Choppā Gekido!! Hogubakku Ma no Ijutsu" (Japanese: チョッパー激怒!! ホグバック魔の医術)	Yutaka Nakashima	Hirohiko Kamisaka	July 20, 2008	October 2, 2016
364	28	"Oars Roars! Come Out, Straw Hat Crew"; Transliteration: "Ōzu Hoeru!! Dete Koi Mugiwara no Ichimi" (Japanese: オーズ吼える!! 出て来い麦わらの一味)	Yukihiko Nakao	Takuya Masumoto	August 3, 2008	October 9, 2016
365	29	"Luffy Is the Enemy! The Ultimate Zombie vs. The Straw Hat Crew"; Transliteration: "Teki wa Rufi!! Saikyō Zonbi tai Mugiwara no Ichimi" (Japanese: 敵はルフィ!! 最強ゾンビ対麦わらの一味)	Directed by : Sumio Watanabe; Storyboarded by : Naotoshi Shida	Koga Naoki	August 10, 2008	October 16, 2016
366	30	"You're Going Down, Absalom!! Nami's Lightning Attack of Friendship!!"; Transliteration: "Taorero Abusaromu!! Nami Yūjō no Raigeki!!" (Japanese: 倒れろアブサロム!! ナミ友情の雷撃!!)	Tetsuya Endō	Tsuyoshi Sakurai	August 17, 2008	October 23, 2016
367	31	"Knock Him Down!! Special Attack: Straw Hat Docking?"; Transliteration: "Ubae Daun!! Hissatsu Mugiwara Dokkingu?" (Japanese: 奪えダウン!! 必殺麦わらドッキング?)	Hiroyuki Satō	Takuya Masumoto	August 24, 2008	November 6, 2016
368	32	"The Silent Assault!! The Mysterious Visitor, Tyrant Kuma"; Transliteration: "Ashioto Naki Shūrai!! Nazo no Hōmonsha: Bōkun Kuma" (Japanese: 足音なき襲来!! 謎の訪問者•暴君くま)	Directed by : Hiroshi Matsuzaka; Storyboarded by : Kenji Yokoyama	Yoshiyuki Suga	August 31, 2008	November 13, 2016
369	33	"Oars + Moria! The Most Heinous Combination of Brains and Brawn"; Transliteration: "Ōzu Purasu Moria – Chikara to Zunō no Saikyō Gattai" (Japanese: オーズ+モリア 力と頭脳の最強合体)	Makoto Sonoda	Hirohiko Kamisaka	September 7, 2008	November 20, 2016
370	34	"The Secret Plan to Turn the Tables! Nightmare Luffy Makes His Appearance"; Transliteration: "Gyakuten e no Hisaku – Naitomea Rufi Kenzan" (Japanese: 逆転への秘策 ナイトメア•ルフィ見参)	Tetsuya Endō	Koga Naoki	September 14, 2008	November 27, 2016
371	35	"The Straw Hat Crew Gets Wiped Out! The Shadow-Shadow's Powers in Full Swing"; Transliteration: "Kaimetsu, Mugiwara Ichimi – Kage Kage no Chikara Zenkai" (Japanese: 壊滅, 麦わら一味 カゲカゲの能力全開)	Yukihiko Nakao	Takuya Masumoto	September 21, 2008	December 4, 2016
372	36	"The Incredible Battle Starts! Luffy vs Luffy"; Transliteration: "Chōzetsu Batoru Sutāto! Rufi Tai Rufi" (Japanese: 超絶バトルスタート! ルフィVSルフィ)	Directed by : Sumio Watanabe; Storyboarded by : Hiroaki Miyamoto	Yoshiyuki Suga	September 28, 2008	December 11, 2016
373	37	"The End of the Battle Is Nigh! Pound in the Finishing Move"; Transliteration: "Ketchaku Semaru! Tatakikome, Todome no Ichigeki" (Japanese: 決着迫る! たたき込め, とどめの一撃)	Yutaka Nakashima	Tsuyoshi Sakurai	October 5, 2008	December 18, 2016
374	38	"Our Bodies Vanish! The Morning Sun Shines On the Nightmarish Island!"; Transliteration: "Karada ga Kieru! Akumu no Shima ni Sasu Asahi!" (Japanese: 肉体が消える! 悪夢の島に射す朝日!)	Naoyuki Itō	Hirohiko Kamisaka	October 12, 2008	January 8, 2017
375	39	"Not Out of Danger Yet! Orders to Annihilate the Straw Hat Crew"; Transliteration: "Owaranai Kiki! Mugiwara Ichimi Massatsu Shirei" (Japanese: 終わらない危機! 麦わら一味抹殺指令)	Directed by : Kiichi Suzuno; Storyboarded by : Naotoshi Shida	Koga Naoki	October 19, 2008	January 15, 2017
376	40	"It Repels Everything! Kuma’s Paw-Paw Power!"; Transliteration: "Subete o Hajiku Kuma no Nikyu Nikyu no Nōryoku" (Japanese: すべてを弾くくまのニキュニキュの能力)	Directed by : Hiroyuki Satō; Storyboarded by : Tetsuya Endō	Takuya Masumoto	November 9, 2008	January 22, 2017
377	41	"The Pain of My Crewmates Is My Pain! Zoro's Desperate Fight!"; Transliteration: "Nakama no Itami wa Waga Itami – Zoro Kesshi no Tatakai" (Japanese: 仲間の痛みは我が痛みゾロ決死の戦い)	Tetsuya Endō	Takuya Masumoto	November 16, 2008	January 29, 2017
378	42	"The Promise from a Distant Day! The Pirates' Song and a Small Whale!"; Transliteration: "Tōi Hi no Yakusoku – Kaizoku no Uta to Chīsa na Kujira" (Japanese: 遠い日の約束 海賊の唄と小さなクジラ)	Directed by : Makoto Sonoda; Storyboarded by : Junji Shimizu	Yoshiyuki Suga	November 23, 2008	February 5, 2017
379	43	"Brook's Past! A Sad Farewell with His Cheerful Comrade!"; Transliteration: "Burukku no Kako – Yōki na Nakama Kanashiki Wakare" (Japanese: ブルックの過去 陽気な仲間悲しき別れ)	Directed by : Hiroshi Matsuzaka; Storyboarded by : Tetsuya Endō	Isao Murayama	November 30, 2008	February 12, 2017
380	44	"Bink's Booze! The Song that Connects the Past with the Present!"; Transliteration: "Binkusu no Sake – Kako to Ima o Tsunagu Uta" (Japanese: ビンクスの酒 過去と現在をつなぐ唄)	Directed by : Hiroyuki Satō; Storyboarded by : Munehisa Sakai	Tsuyoshi Sakurai	December 7, 2008	February 19, 2017
381	45	"A New Crewmate! The Musician, Humming Brook!"; Transliteration: "Aratana Nakama! Ongakuka – Hanauta no Burukku" (Japanese: 新たな仲間! 音楽家·鼻唄のブルック)	Directed by : Yutaka Nakashima; Storyboarded by : Tetsuya Endō	Koga Naoki	December 14, 2008	February 26, 2017

=== Season 11: Sabaody Archipelago (2008–09) ===
No. overall	No. in season	Title	Directed by	Written by	Original release date	English air date
Spa Island
382	1	"The Slow-Slow Menace! 'Silver Fox' Foxy Returns!"; Transliteration: "Noro Noro no Kyōi – Gingitsune no Fokushī Futatabi" (Japanese: ノロノロの脅威 銀狐のフォクシー再び)	Tetsuya Endō	Takuya Masumoto	December 21, 2008	March 5, 2017
383	2	"The Great Scramble for Treasure! Collapse! Spa Island!"; Transliteration: "Otakara Daisōdatsusen! Hōkai! Supa Airando-gō" (Japanese: お宝大争奪戦! 崩壊! スパアイランド号)	Directed by : Makoto Sonoda; Storyboarded by : Tetsuya Endō	Takuya Masumoto	December 28, 2008	March 12, 2017
384	3	"Brook's Great Struggle! Is the Path to Becoming a True Comrade Rigorous?"; Transliteration: "Burukku Daifuntō – Shin no Nakama e no Michi Kewashi?" (Japanese: ブルック大奮闘 真の仲間への道険し?)	Naoyuki Itō	Yoshiyuki Suga	January 11, 2009	March 19, 2017
Sabaody Archipelago
385	4	"Arriving at Halfway Through the Grand Line! The Red Line"; Transliteration: "Gurand Rain Hanshū Tōtatsu! Reddo Rain" (Japanese: 偉大なる航路半周到達! 赤い土の大陸)	Yutaka Nakashima	Isao Murayama	January 18, 2009	—
386	5	"Hatred of the Straw Hat Crew – Enter Iron Mask Duval"; Transliteration: "Mugiwara Ichimi Nikushi – Tekkamen no Dyubaru Tōjō" (Japanese: 麦わら一味憎し 鉄仮面のデュバル登場)	Sumio Watanabe	Koga Naoki	January 25, 2009	—
387	6	"The Fated Reunion! Save the Imprisoned Fish-man"; Transliteration: "Innen no Saikai! Toraware no Gyojin o Sukuidase" (Japanese: 因縁の再会! 囚われの魚人を救い出せ)	Yukihiko Nakao	Tsuyoshi Sakurai	February 1, 2009	—
388	7	"Tragedy! The Truth of the Unmasked Duval"; Transliteration: "Higeki! Kamen ni Kakusareta Dyubaru no Shinjitsu" (Japanese: 悲劇! 仮面に隠されたデュバルの真実)	Yoshihiro Ueda	Yoshiyuki Suga	February 8, 2009	—
389	8	"Explosion! The Sunny's Super Secret Weapon: Gaon Cannon"; Transliteration: "Sakuretsu! Sanī-gō no Chōhimitsu Heiki Gaon Hō" (Japanese: 炸裂! サニー号の超秘密兵器ガオン砲)	Katsumi Tokoro	Yoshiyuki Suga	February 15, 2009	—
390	9	"Landing to Get to Fish-man Island – The Sabaody Archipelago"; Transliteration: "Gyojintō o Mokushishite Jōriku – Shabondi Shotō" (Japanese: 魚人島を目指して上陸 シャボンディ諸島)	Hiroaki Miyamoto	Hirohiko Kamisaka	February 22, 2009	—
391	10	"Tyranny! The Rulers of Sabaody, the Celestial Dragons"; Transliteration: "Bōgyaku! Shabondi no Shihaisha Tenryūbito" (Japanese: 暴虐! シャボンディの支配者天竜人)	Yukihiko Nakao	Hitoshi Tanaka	March 1, 2009	—
392	11	"New Rivals Gather! The 11 Supernovas"; Transliteration: "Aratana Raibaru Shūketsu! Jūichinin no Chōshinsei" (Japanese: 新たなライバル集結! 11人の超新星)	Hiroyuki Satō	Hirohiko Kamisaka	March 8, 2009	—
393	12	"The Target is Camie! The Looming Clutches of a Professional Kidnapper"; Transliteration: "Hyōteki wa Keimī!! Semaru Hitosarai-ya no Mashu" (Japanese: 標的はケイミー!! 迫る人攫い屋の魔手)	Tetsuya Endō	Yoshiyuki Suga	March 15, 2009	—
394	13	"Rescue Camie! The Archipelago’s Lingering Dark History"; Transliteration: "Keimī o Sukue - Shotō ni Nokoru Ankoku no Rekishi" (Japanese: ケイミーを救え 諸島に残る暗黒の歴史)	Makoto Sonoda	Hitoshi Tanaka	March 29, 2009	—
395	14	"Time Limit – The Human Auction Begins"; Transliteration: "Taimu Rimitto - Hyūman Ōkushon Kaimaku" (Japanese: タイムリミット 人間オークション開幕)	Yutaka Nakashima	Yoshiyuki Suga	April 5, 2009	—
396	15	"The Fist Explodes! Destroy the Auction"; Transliteration: "Tekken Sakuretsu! Ōkushon o Buttsubuse" (Japanese: 鉄拳炸裂! オークションをぶっつぶせ)	Katsumi Tokoro	Hirohiko Kamisaka	April 12, 2009	—
397	16	"Major Panic! Desperate Struggle at the Auction House"; Transliteration: "Dai Panikku! Ōkushon Kaijō no Shitō" (Japanese: 大パニック! オークション会場の死闘)	Yoshihiro Ueda	Hitoshi Tanaka	April 19, 2009	—
398	17	"Admiral Kizaru Takes Action! Sabaody Archipelago Thrown into Chaos"; Transliteration: "Taishō Kizaru Ugoku! Sōzen Shabondi Shotō" (Japanese: 大将黄猿動く! 騒然シャボンディ諸島)	Sumio Watanabe	Yoshiyuki Suga	April 26, 2009	—
399	18	"Break Through the Siege! The Navy vs. the Three Captains"; Transliteration: "Hōim Ami o Toppaseyo! Kaigun VS Sannin no Senchō" (Japanese: 包囲網を突破せよ! 海軍VS三人の船長)	Yukihiko Nakao	Hirohiko Kamisaka	May 3, 2009	—
400	19	"Roger and Rayleigh – the King of the Pirates and His Right Hand Man"; Transliteration: "Rojā to Reirī – Kaizoku Ō to sono Migiude" (Japanese: ロジャーとレイリー 海賊王とその右腕)	Katsumi Tokoro	Yoshiyuki Suga	May 10, 2009	—
401	20	"No Escape!? Admiral Kizaru’s Light Speed Kick!!"; Transliteration: "Kaihi Fukanō!? Taishō Kizaru no Kōsoku no Keri" (Japanese: 回避不可能!? 大将黄猿の光速の蹴り)	Yutaka Nakashima	Hitoshi Tanaka	May 17, 2009	—
402	21	"Overwhelming! The Navy’s Fighting Weapons, the Pacifistas"; Transliteration: "Attōteki! Kaigun no Sentō Heiki Pashifisuta" (Japanese: 圧倒的! 海軍の戦闘兵器パシフィスタ)	Tetsuya Endō	Yoshiyuki Suga	May 24, 2009	—
403	22	"An Even Stronger Enemy Appears! The Battle Axe-Carrying Sentomaru"; Transliteration: "Saranaru Kyōteki Arawaru! Masakari Katsuida Sentōmaru" (Japanese: さらなる強敵現る! 鉞かついだ戦桃丸)	Yoshihiro Ueda	Yoshiyuki Suga	May 31, 2009	—
404	23	"Admiral Kizaru's Fierce Assault! The Straw Hats Face Certain Death!"; Transliteration: "Taishō Kizaru no Mōkō – Mugiwara Ichimi Zettaizetsumei!" (Japanese: 大将黄猿の猛攻 麦わら一味絶体絶命!)	Makoto Sonoda	Hirohiko Kamisaka	June 7, 2009	—
405	24	"Eliminated Friends – The Final Day of the Straw Hat Crew"; Transliteration: "Kesareta Nakama-tachi – Mugiwara Ichimi Saigo no Hi" (Japanese: 消された仲間たち 麦わら一味最後の日)	Hiroaki Miyamoto	Hirohiko Kamisaka	June 14, 2009	—
Boss Luffy Historical Special
406	25	"Feudal Era Side Story – Boss Luffy Appears Again"; Transliteration: "Jidaigeki Tokubetsu Hen – Rufi-Oyabun Futatabi Kenzan" (Japanese: 時代劇特別編 ルフィ親分再び見参)	Tetsuya Endō	Hitoshi Tanaka	June 21, 2009	—
407	26	"Feudal Era Side Story – Defeat Thriller Company's Trap"; Transliteration: "Jidaigeki Tokubetsu Hen – Yabure! Surirā Shōkai no Wana" (Japanese: 時代劇特別編 破れ! スリラー商会の罠)	Naoyuki Itō	Hitoshi Tanaka	June 28, 2009	—

=== Season 12: Island of Women (2009) ===
No. overall	No. in season	Title (Note: Title of the episode: as given by Funimation Entertainment's subtitles, romanized using Hepburn romanization, and in kanji form)	Directed by	Written by	Original release date
Amazon Lily
408	1	"Landing! The All-Female Island, Amazon Lily"; Transliteration: "Jōriku! Danshi Kinsei no Shima Amazon Rirī" (Japanese: 上陸! 男子禁制の島アマゾン·リリー)	Yoshihiro Ueda	Hirohiko Kamisaka	July 5, 2009
409	2	"Hurry Back to Your Friends! The Maiden Island Adventure"; Transliteration: "Isoge! Nakama no Moto e – Nyōgashima no Bōken" (Japanese: 急げ! 仲間のもとへ 女ヶ島の冒険)	Katsumi Tokoro	Hitoshi Tanaka	July 12, 2009
410	3	"Everyone Falls in Love! Pirate Empress Hancock"; Transliteration: "Minna Meromero! Kaizoku Jotei Hankokku" (Japanese: みんなメロメロ! 海賊女帝ハンコック)	Yutaka Nakashima	Yoshiyuki Suga	July 19, 2009
411	4	"The Secret Hidden on the Backs – Luffy and the Snake Princess Meet"; Transliteration: "Senaka ni Kakusareta Himitsu – Sōgū Rufi to Hebihime" (Japanese: 背中に隠された秘密 遭遇ルフィと蛇姫)	Yukihiko Nakao	Hitoshi Tanaka	August 2, 2009
412	5	"Heartless Judgment! Margaret is Turned to Stone!!"; Transliteration: "Hijō no Sabaki! Ishi ni Sareta Māgaretto!!" (Japanese: 非情の裁き! 石にされたマーガレット!!)	Gō Koga	Yoshiyuki Suga	August 9, 2009
413	6	"A Difficult Fight for Luffy! The Snake Sisters' Haki Power!!"; Transliteration: "Rufi Daikusen! Hebi Shimai no Haki no Chikara!!" (Japanese: ルフィ第苦戦! ヘビ姉妹の覇気の力!!)	Sumio Watanabe	Hitoshi Tanaka	August 16, 2009
414	7	"All-Out Special Power Battle!! Gum-Gum vs. Snake-Snake"; Transliteration: "Nōryoku Zenkai Batoru!! Gomu Gomu vs. Hebi Hebi" (Japanese: 能力全開バトル!! ゴムゴムVSヘビヘビ)	Directed by : Yutaka Nakashima; Storyboarded by : Makoto Sonoda	Yoshiyuki Suga	August 23, 2009
Post-Amazon Lily
415	8	"Hancock's Confession – The Sisters' Abhorrent Past"; Transliteration: "Hankokku no Kokuhaku – Shimai no Imawashiki Kako" (Japanese: ハンコックの告白 姉妹の忌まわしき過去)	Yoshihiro Ueda	Hitoshi Tanaka	August 30, 2009
416	9	"Saving Ace! The Next Stop: the Great Prison!"; Transliteration: "Ēsu o Sukue! Arata na Mokutekichi wa Daikangoku" (Japanese: エースを救え! 新たな目的地は大監獄)	Katsumi Tokoro	Yoshiyuki Suga	September 6, 2009
417	10	"Love is a Hurricane! Love-Love Hancock!"; Transliteration: "Koi wa Harikēn! Meromero Hankokku" (Japanese: 恋はハリケーン! メロメロハンコック)	Naoyuki Itō	Yoshiyuki Suga	September 13, 2009
Straw Hat's Separation Serial
418	11	"The Friends' Whereabouts – The Science of Weather and the Mechanical Island"; Transliteration: "Nakama-tachi no Yukue – Tenkō no Kagaku to Karakurishima" (Japanese: 仲間達の行方 天候の科学とからくり島)	Tetsuya Endō	Hitoshi Tanaka	September 20, 2009
419	12	"The Friends' Whereabouts! An Island of Giant Birds and a Pink Paradise!"; Transliteration: "Nakama-tachi no Yukue – Kyōdori no Shima to Momoiro no Rakuen!" (Japanese: 仲間達の行方 巨鳥の島と桃色の楽園!)	Yutaka Nakashima	Yoshiyuki Suga	September 27, 2009
420	13	"The Friends' Whereabouts – Bridging the Islands and Vicious Vegetations!"; Transliteration: "Nakama-tachi no Yukue – Shima o Tsunagu Hashi to Shokujin Shokubutsu" (Japanese: 仲間達の行方 島をつなぐ橋と食人植物)	Gō Koga	Hitoshi Tanaka	October 4, 2009
421	14	"The Friends' Whereabouts! A Negative Princess and the King of Demons!"; Transliteration: "Nakama-tachi no Yukue – Negatibu Purinsesu to Akumaō" (Japanese: 仲間達の行方 ネガティブ王女と悪魔王)	Katsumi Tokoro	Yoshiyuki Suga	October 11, 2009

=== Season 13: Impel Down (2009–10) ===
No. overall	No. in season	Title	Directed by	Written by	Original release date
Impel Down
422	1	"A Deadly Infiltration! The Underwater Prison Impel Down!"; Transliteration: "Kesshi no Sennyū! Kaitei Kangoku Inperu Daun" (Japanese: 決死の潜入! 海底監獄インペルダウン)	Yoshihiro Ueda	Yoshiyuki Suga	October 18, 2009
423	2	"A Reunion in Hell?! The Man Who Ate the Chop-Chop Fruit!"; Transliteration: "Jigoku de Saikai!? Bara Bara no Mi no Nōryokusha!" (Japanese: 地獄で再会!? バラバラの実の実力者!)	Directed by : Yutaka Nakashima; Storyboarded by : Naoyuki Itō	Hitoshi Tanaka	October 25, 2009
424	3	"Break Through the Crimson Hell! Buggy's Chaos-Inducing Plan!"; Transliteration: "Yabure! Guren Jigoku – Bagī no Dohade Daisakusen" (Japanese: 破れ! 紅蓮地獄 バギーのド派手大作戦)	Tetsuya Endō	Hitoshi Tanaka	November 1, 2009
425	4	"The Strongest Man in the Prison! Poison Man Magellan Appears!"; Transliteration: "Kangoku Saikyō no Otoko! Doku Ningen Mazeran Tōjō" (Japanese: 監獄最強の男! 毒人間マゼラン登場)	Sumio Watanabe	Yoshiyuki Suga	November 8, 2009
Little East Blue
426	5	"A Special Presentation Related to the Movie! A Gold Lion's Ambition on the Move!"; Transliteration: "Eiga Rendō Supesharu – Ugokidasu Kinjishi no Yabō" (Japanese: 映画連動特別編 動き出す金獅子の野望)	Hiroaki Miyamoto	Hirohiko Kamisaka	November 15, 2009
427	6	"A Special Presentation Related to the Movie! Little East Blue in Danger!"; Transliteration: "Eiga Rendō Supesharu – Nerawareta Ritoru Īsuto Burū" (Japanese: 映画連動特別編 狙われた小さな東の海)	Tetsuya Endō	Hirohiko Kamisaka	November 22, 2009
428	7	"A Special Presentation Related to the Movie! The Fierce Onslaught of the Amigo Pirates!"; Transliteration: "Eiga Rendō Supesharu – Amīgo Kaizoku-dan no Mōkō" (Japanese: 映画連動特別編 アミーゴ海賊団の猛攻)	Directed by : Katsumi Tokoro; Storyboarded by : Kenji Yokoyama	Hirohiko Kamisaka	November 29, 2009
429	8	"A Special Presentation Related to the Movie! The Battle is on! - Luffy vs. Largo"; Transliteration: "Eiga Rendō Supesharu – Kessen! Rufi VS Rarugo" (Japanese: 映画連動特別編 決戦! ルフィVSラルゴ)	Naoyuki Itō	Hirohiko Kamisaka	December 6, 2009
Impel Down
430	9	"A Warlord in Prison! Jimbei the First Son of the Sea!"; Transliteration: "Toraware no Ōka Shichibukai! Kaikyō no Jinbē" (Japanese: 囚われの王下七武海! 海侠のジンベエ)	Yoshihiro Ueda	Yoshiyuki Suga	December 13, 2009
431	10	"Chief Jailer Saldeath's Trap! Level 3 – Starvation Hell!"; Transliteration: "Rōbanchō Sarudesu no Wana – Reberu Surī Kiga Jigoku" (Japanese: 牢番長サルデスの罠 LV.3飢餓地獄)	Directed by : Sumio Watanabe; Storyboarded by : Takahiro Imamura	Hitoshi Tanaka	December 20, 2009
432	11	"The Unleashed Swan! A Reunion with Bon Clay!"; Transliteration: "Tokihanatareta Suwan! Saikai! Bon Kurē" (Japanese: 解き放たれた白鳥! 再会! ボン・クレー)	Yutaka Nakashima	Hirohiko Kamisaka	December 27, 2009
433	12	"Warden Magellan's Strategy! Straw Hat Entrapment Completed!"; Transliteration: "Shochō Mazeran Ugoku – Kansei! Mugiwara Hōimō" (Japanese: 署長マゼラン動く 完成! 麦わら包囲網)	Tetsuya Endō	Hirohiko Kamisaka	January 10, 2010
434	13	"All Forces Have Gathered! The Battle on Level 4 – The Burning Heat Hell!"; Transliteration: "Zensenryoku shūketsu! Reberu Fō – Shōnetsu Jigoku no Kessen" (Japanese: 全戦力集結！ LV4·焦熱地獄の決戦)	Katsumi Tokoro	Hitoshi Tanaka	January 17, 2010
435	14	"Mighty Magellan! Bon Clay Bugs Out!"; Transliteration: "Mazeran Tsuyoshi! Bon Kurē Tekizen Tōbō" (Japanese: マゼラン強し! ボン・クレー敵前逃亡)	Takahiro Imamura	Yoshiyuki Suga	January 24, 2010
436	15	"The Showdown Has Come! Luffy's Desperate Last Attack!"; Transliteration: "Shiyū Kessu! Sutemi no Rufi Saigo no Ichigeki" (Japanese: 雌雄決す! 捨て身のルフィ最後の一撃)	Hiroaki Miyamoto	Hitoshi Tanaka	January 31, 2010
437	16	"For His Friend! Bon Clay Goes to the Deadly Rescue!"; Transliteration: "Dachi dakara – Bon Kurē Kesshi no Kyūshutsugyō" (Japanese: 友達だから ボン・クレー決死の救出行)	Yoshihiro Ueda	Yoshiyuki Suga	February 7, 2010
438	17	"A Paradise in Hell! Impel Down – Level 5.5!"; Transliteration: "Jigoku ni Rakuen! Inperu Daun Reberu Go ten Go" (Japanese: 地獄に楽園! インペルダウン LV5.5)	Yoshihiro Ueda	Hirohiko Kamisaka	February 14, 2010
439	18	"Luffy's Treatment Begins! Iva's Miraculous Power!"; Transliteration: "Rufi Chiryō Kaishi! Iwa-san Kiseki no Chikara" (Japanese: ルフィ治療開始! イワさん奇跡の能力)	Tetsuya Endō	Hirohiko Kamisaka	February 21, 2010
440	19	"Believe in Miracles! Bon Clay's Cries From the Heart!"; Transliteration: "Kiseki o Shinjite! Bon Kurē Tamashii no Seien" (Japanese: 奇跡を信じて! ボン・クレー魂の声援)	Yutaka Nakashima	Yoshiyuki Suga	February 28, 2010
441	20	"Luffy Back In Action! Iva Begins the Breakout Plan!"; Transliteration: "Rufi Fukkatsu! Iwa-san Datsugoku Keikaku Shidō!!" (Japanese: ルフィ復活! イワさん脱獄計画始動!!)	Katsumi Tokoro	Hitoshi Tanaka	March 7, 2010
442	21	"Ace's Convoy Begins! Battle on the Lowest Floor – Level 6!"; Transliteration: "Ēsu Gosō Kaishi – Saikasō Reberu Shikkusu Kōbō" (Japanese: エース護送開始 最下層LV6の攻防!)	Sumio Watanabe	Hitoshi Tanaka	March 14, 2010
443	22	"The Ultimate Team Has Formed! Shaking Impel Down!"; Transliteration: "Saikyō Chīmu Kessei – Shinkan! Inperudaun" (Japanese: 最強チーム結成 震撼! インペルダウン)	Tetsuya Endō	Yoshiyuki Suga	March 21, 2010
444	23	"Even More Chaos! Here Comes Blackbeard Teach!"; Transliteration: "Saranaru Konran! Kurohige Tīchi Shūrai!" (Japanese: さらなる混乱! 黒ひげ・ティーチ襲来!)	Takahiro Imamura	Hirohiko Kamisaka	March 28, 2010
445	24	"The Dangerous Encounter! Blackbeard and Shiryu of the Rain!"; Transliteration: "Kiken na Deai! Kurohige to Ame no Shiryū" (Japanese: 危険な出会い！黒ひげと雨のシリュウ)	Yoshihiro Ueda	Yoshiyuki Suga	April 4, 2010
446	25	"Refusal to be Defeated! Serious Hannyabal"; Transliteration: "Iji demo Taorenu! Honki no Hannyabaru" (Japanese: 意地でも倒れぬ！本気のハンニャバル)	Yutaka Nakashima	Hitoshi Tanaka	April 11, 2010
447	26	"Jet Pistol of Anger! Luffy vs. Blackbeard!"; Transliteration: "Ikari no Jetto Pisutoru – Rufi vs Kurohige" (Japanese: 怒りのJETピストル ルフィvs黒ヒゲ)	Makoto Sonoda	Yoshiyuki Suga	April 18, 2010
448	27	"Stop Magellan! Ivan-san's Esoteric Technique Explodes!"; Transliteration: "Mazeran o Tomero! Iwa-san Ōgi Sakuretsu" (Japanese: マゼランを止めろ！イワさん奥義炸裂)	Tetsuya Endō	Yoshiyuki Suga	April 25, 2010
449	28	"Magellan's Tricky Move! A Foiled Escape Plan!"; Transliteration: "Mazeran no Kisaku! Habamareta Datsugoku Sakusen" (Japanese: マゼランの奇策！はばまれた脱獄計画)	Hiroyuki Satō	Hitoshi Tanaka	May 2, 2010
450	29	"The Escapee Team in Trouble! The Forbidden Move: Venom Demon!"; Transliteration: "Datsugoku Chīmu Zettaizetsumei – Kinjite 'Benomu Dēmon'" (Japanese: 脱獄チーム絶体絶命 禁じ手"毒の巨兵")	Katsumi Tokoro	Hirohiko Kamisaka	May 9, 2010
451	30	"Come, Final Miracle! Break Through the Gate of Justice!"; Transliteration: "Okose Saigo no Kiseki – Seigi no Mon o Toppaseyo" (Japanese: 起こせ最後の奇跡 正義の門を突破せよ)	Takahiro Imamura	Yoshiyuki Suga	May 16, 2010
452	31	"To the Navy Headquarters! Off to Rescue Ace!"; Transliteration: "Mezase Kaigun Honbu – Ēsu Kyūshutsu e no Funade" (Japanese: 目指せ海軍本部 エース救出への船出!)	Yoshihiro Ueda	Hitoshi Tanaka	May 23, 2010
Straw Hat's Separation Serial
453	32	"The Friends' Whereabouts! The Weatheria Report and the Cyborg Animals!"; Transliteration: "Nakama-tachi no Yukue – Wezaria Ripōto to Saibōgu Animaru" (Japanese: 仲間達の行方 空島リポートと改造動物)	Directed by : Aya Komaki; Storyboarded by : Tetsuya Endō	Hitoshi Tanaka	May 30, 2010
454	33	"The Friends' Whereabouts! The Chick of a Giant Bird and a Pink Showdown!"; Transliteration: "Nakama-tachi no Yukue – Kyochō no Hina to Momoiro no Taiketsu" (Japanese: 仲間達の行方 巨鳥のヒナと桃色の対決)	Yutaka Nakashima	Yoshiyuki Suga	June 6, 2010
455	34	"The Friends' Whereabouts! Revolutionaries and the Gorging Forest's Trap"; Transliteration: "Nakama-tachi no Yukue – Kakumeigun to Bōshoku no Mori no Wana!" (Japanese: 仲間達の行方 革命軍と暴食の森の罠!)	Gō Koga	Hirohiko Kamisaka	June 13, 2010
456	35	"The Friends' Whereabouts! A Huge Tomb and the Panty Debt!"; Transliteration: "Nakama-tachi no Yukue – Kyodai no Hakajirushi to Pantsu no On" (Japanese: 仲間達の行方 巨大の墓標とパンツの恩)	Katsumi Tokoro	Hirohiko Kamisaka	June 20, 2010

=== Season 14: Marineford (2010–11) ===
No. overall	No. in season	Title	Directed by	Written by	Original release date
Marineford
457	1	"A Special Retrospective Before Marineford! The Vow of the Brotherhood"; Transliteration: "Marinfōdo Chokuzen Kaisou Supesharu – Kyōdai no Chikai!" (Japanese: 海軍本部直前回想特別編 兄弟の誓い!)	Makoto Sonoda	Hirohiko Kamisaka	June 27, 2010
458	2	"A Special Retrospective Before Marineford! The Three Navy Admirals Come Together!"; Transliteration: "Marinfōdo Chokuzen Kaisou Supesharu – Shūketsu! San Taishō" (Japanese: 海軍本部直前回想特別編 集結! 三大将)	Hiroyuki Satō	Hirohiko Kamisaka	July 11, 2010
459	3	"Ticking Down to the Time of Battle! The Navy's Strongest Lineup in Position!"; Transliteration: "Kessen no Toki Semaru! Kaigun Saikyō no Fujin Kansei!" (Japanese: 決戦の刻迫る! 海軍最強の布陣完成!)	Hiroaki Miyamoto	Yoshiyuki Suga	July 18, 2010
460	4	"A Vast Fleet Appears! Here Come the Whitebeard Pirates!"; Transliteration: "Kyodai Kantai Arawaru – Shūrai! Shirohige Kaizoku-dan" (Japanese: 巨大艦隊あらわる 襲来! 白ひげ海賊団)	Takahiro Imamura	Hitoshi Tanaka	August 1, 2010
461	5	"The Beginning of the War! Ace and Whitebeard's Past!"; Transliteration: "Kessen no Makuake! Ēsu to Shirohige no Kako" (Japanese: 決戦の幕開け! エースと白ひげの過去)	Directed by : Sumio Watanabe; Storyboarded by : Naoyuki Itō	Hitoshi Tanaka	August 8, 2010
462	6	"The Force That Could Destroy the World! The Power of the Tremor-Tremor Fruit!"; Transliteration: "Sekai o Horobosu Chikara! Gura Gura no Mi no Nōryoku" (Japanese: 世界を滅ぼす力! グラグラの実の能力)	Yoshihiro Ueda	Yoshiyuki Suga	August 15, 2010
463	7	"An All-Consuming Inferno!! Admiral Akainu's Power!"; Transliteration: "Subete o Yakitsukusu!! Taishō Akainu no Chikara!" (Japanese: すべてを焼き尽くす!! 大将赤犬の能力!)	Yutaka Nakashima	Hirohiko Kamisaka	August 22, 2010
464	8	"A Descendant of the Beast! Little Oars Jr. - Full Speed Ahead!"; Transliteration: "Majin no Shison! Ritoru Ōzu Junia Bakushin!" (Japanese: 魔人の子孫! リトルオーズJr.驀進！)	Katsumi Tokoro	Hitoshi Tanaka	August 29, 2010
465	9	"Justice For the Winners! Sengoku's Strategy in Action!"; Transliteration: "Shōsha dake ga Seigi – Hatsudō! Sengoku no Sakusen" (Japanese: 勝者だけが正義 発動! センゴクの作戦)	Aya Komaki	Yoshiyuki Suga	September 5, 2010
466	10	"Straw Hat Team Arrives! Tension Grows at the Battlefield"; Transliteration: "Mugiwara Chīmu Tōchaku – Fūunkyū o Tsugeru Senjō" (Japanese: 麦わらチーム到着 風雲急を告げる戦場)	Gō Koga	Hirohiko Kamisaka	September 12, 2010
467	11	"Even If It Means Death! Luffy vs. the Navy; The Battle Starts!"; Transliteration: "Shindemo Tasukeru – Rufi VS Kaigun Batoru Sutāto" (Japanese: 死んでも助ける ルフィVS海軍戦闘開始)	Naoyuki Itō	Hitoshi Tanaka	September 19, 2010
468	12	"Hard Battles, One After Another! Devil Fruit Eaters vs. Devil Fruit Eaters!"; Transliteration: "Gekisen no Renzoku! Nōryokusha Gundan VS Nōryokusha Gundan" (Japanese: 激戦の連続! 能力者軍団VS能力者軍団)	Makoto Sonoda	Yoshiyuki Suga	September 26, 2010
469	13	"Kuma's Transformation! Ivan-san's Blow of Anger!"; Transliteration: "Kuma ni Okita Ihen – Iwa-san Ikari no Ichigeki" (Japanese: クマに起きた異変 イワさん怒りの一撃)	Yoshihiro Ueda	Hirohiko Kamisaka	October 3, 2010
470	14	"The Great Swordsman Mihawk! Luffy Comes Under the Attack of the Black Sword!"; Transliteration: "Kengō Mihōku – Rufi ni Semaru Kokutō no Zangeki" (Japanese: 剣豪ミホーク ルフィに迫る黒刀の斬撃)	Takahiro Imamura	Yoshiyuki Suga	October 10, 2010
471	15	"The Extermination Strategy in Action! The Power of the Pacifistas!"; Transliteration: "Senmetsu Sakusen Shidō – Pashifisuta Gundan no Iryoku" (Japanese: 殲滅作戦始動 パシフィスタ軍団の威力)	Yutaka Nakashima	Hitoshi Tanaka	October 17, 2010
472	16	"Akainu's Plot! Whitebeard Entrapped!"; Transliteration: "Akainu no Bōryaku! Otoshiirerareta Shirohige" (Japanese: 赤犬の謀略! おとしいれられた白ひげ)	Sumio Watanabe	Hirohiko Kamisaka	October 24, 2010
473	17	"The Encircling Walls Activated! The Whitebeard Pirates Backed into a Corner!!"; Transliteration: "Hōi Sakusen Sadō! Shirohige Kaizoku-dan Zettaizetsumei!!" (Japanese: 包囲壁作動! 白ひげ海賊団絶体絶命!!)	Hiroaki Miyamoto	Hitoshi Tanaka	October 31, 2010
474	18	"Execution Order Issued! Break Through the Encircling Walls!"; Transliteration: "Shokei Shikkō Meirei Kudaru – Hōiheki o Toppaseyo!" (Japanese: 処刑執行命令下る 包囲壁を突破せよ!)	Aya Komaki	Yoshiyuki Suga	November 7, 2010
475	19	"Moving Into the Final Phase! Whitebeard's Trump Card for Recovery!"; Transliteration: "Saishū Kyokumen Totsunyū! Shirohige Kishikaisei no Itte" (Japanese: 最終局面突入! 白ひげ起死回生の一手)	Katsumi Tokoro	Hirohiko Kamisaka	November 14, 2010
476	20	"Luffy at the End of his Tether! An All-Out Battle at the Oris Plaza!"; Transliteration: "Rufi Chikaratsuku! Orisu Hiroba no Sōryokusen!!" (Japanese: ルフィ力尽く! オリス広場の総力戦!!)	Yoshihiro Ueda	Hitoshi Tanaka	November 21, 2010
477	21	"The Power That Will Shorten One's Life! Energy Hormone, Redux!"; Transliteration: "Inochi o Kezuru Chikara – Tenshon Horumon Futatabi" (Japanese: 命を削る力 テンション・ホルモン再び)	Naoyuki Itō	Yoshiyuki Suga	November 28, 2010
478	22	"To Live Up to a Promise! Luffy and Coby Collide!"; Transliteration: "Yakusoku no Tame ni!! Gekitotsu! Rufi to Kobī" (Japanese: 約束のために!! 激突! ルフィとコビー)	Gō Koga	Hirohiko Kamisaka	December 5, 2010
479	23	"The Scaffold at Last! The Way to Ace Has Opened!"; Transliteration: "Shokeidai Mokuzen! Hirakareta Ēsu e no Michi!!" (Japanese: 処刑台目前! 開かれたエースへの道!!)	Makoto Sonoda	Hitoshi Tanaka	December 12, 2010
480	24	"Each on Different Paths! Luffy vs. Garp!"; Transliteration: "Sorezore no Eranda Michi – Rufi vs Gāpu!" (Japanese: それぞれの選んだ道 ルフィVSガープ!)	Takahiro Imamura	Yoshiyuki Suga	December 19, 2010
481	25	"Ace Rescued! Whitebeard's Final Order!"; Transliteration: "Ēsu Kyūshutsu! Shirohige Saigo no Senchō Meirei!" (Japanese: エース救出! 白ひげ最後の船長命令!)	Yutaka Nakashima	Hirohiko Kamisaka	December 26, 2010
482	26	"The Power That Can Burn Even Fire! Akainu's Ruthless Pursuit!"; Transliteration: "Hi o mo Yakitsukusu Chikara – Akainu Hijō no Tsuigeki" (Japanese: 火をも焼き尽くす能力 赤犬非情の追撃)	Yoshihiro Ueda	Yoshiyuki Suga	January 9, 2011
483	27	"Looking for the Answer! Fire Fist Ace Dies on the Battlefield!"; Transliteration: "Kotae o Sagashite – Hiken no Ēsu Senjō ni Shisu" (Japanese: 答えを探して 火拳のエース戦場に死す)	Hiroaki Miyamoto	Hirohiko Kamisaka	January 16, 2011
484	28	"The Navy Headquarters Falls! Whitebeard's Unspeakable Wrath!"; Transliteration: "Kaigun Honbu Hōkai! Shirohige Kotobanaki Ikari!" (Japanese: 海軍本部崩壊! 白ひげ言葉なき怒り!)	Aya Komaki	Hitoshi Tanaka	January 23, 2011
485	29	"Ending the Matter! Whitebeard vs. The Blackbeard Pirates!"; Transliteration: "Kejime o Tsukeru – Shirohige VS Kurohige Kaizoku-dan" (Japanese: ケジメをつける 白ひげVS黒ひげ海賊団)	Katsumi Tokoro	Hirohiko Kamisaka	January 30, 2011
486	30	"The Show Begins! Blackbeard's Plot is Revealed!"; Transliteration: "Shō no Kaimaku – Akasareta Kurohige no Takurami" (Japanese: ショーの開幕 明かされた黒ひげの企み)	Naoyuki Itō	Yoshiyuki Suga	February 6, 2011
487	31	"The Insatiable Akainu! Lava Fists Pummel Luffy!"; Transliteration: "Akainu no Shūnen! Rufi o Osou Maguma no Kobushi" (Japanese: 赤犬の執念! ルフィを襲うマグマの拳)	Gō Koga	Hitoshi Tanaka	February 13, 2011
488	32	"The Desperate Scream! Courageous Moments That Will Change the Future"; Transliteration: "Hisshi no Sakebi – Unmei o Kaeru Yūki aru Sūbyō" (Japanese: 必死の叫び 運命を変える勇気ある数秒)	Yoshihiro Ueda	Yoshiyuki Suga	February 20, 2011
489	33	"Here Comes Shanks! The War of the Best is Finally Over!"; Transliteration: "Shankusu Kenzan! Chōjō Sensō Tsuini Shūketsu" (Japanese: シャンクス見参! 頂上戦争ついに終結)	Yutaka Nakashima	Hitoshi Tanaka	March 6, 2011
Post-War
490	34	"Mighty Leaders Face Each Other Down! Heralding the "New Era"!"; Transliteration: "Gun'yūkakkyosu! "Atarashī Jidai" no Hajimari!" (Japanese: 群雄割拠す! "新しい時代"の始まり!)	Directed by : Takahiro Imamura; Storyboarded by : Naotoshi Shida	Hirohiko Kamisaka	March 20, 2011
491	35	"Landing at the Maiden Island! The Harsh Reality Falls Upon Luffy!"; Transliteration: "Nyōgashima Jōriku – Rufi o Semeru Kakoku na Genjitsu" (Japanese: 女ヶ島上陸 ルフィを責める過酷な現実)	Directed by : Makoto Sonoda; Storyboarded by : Eisaku Inoue	Yoshiyuki Suga	March 27, 2011
Toriko x One Piece Collaboration Special
492	36	"The Strongest Tag-Team! Luffy and Toriko's Hard Struggle!"; Transliteration: "Saikyō Taggu! Funtō, Rufi to Toriko!" (Japanese: 最強タッグ! 奮闘、ルフィとトリコ!)	Naoyuki Itō	Isao Murayama	April 3, 2011 (Note: This episode aired as the second half of a one hour TV Special alongside Toriko. In North America, it was skipped during Funimation's simulcast and subsequently released by Crunchyroll on October 18, 2014.)
Post-War
493	37	"Luffy and Ace! The Story of How the Brothers Met!"; Transliteration: "Rufi to Ēsu – Kyōdai no Deai no Monogatari!" (Japanese: ルフィとエース 兄弟の出会いの物語!)	Aya Komaki	Hitoshi Tanaka	April 10, 2011
494	38	"Here Comes Sabo! The Boy at the Gray Terminal!"; Transliteration: "Sabo Tōjō! Gurei Tāminaru no Shōnen" (Japanese: サボ登場! 不確かな物の終着駅の少年)	Katsumi Tokoro	Hitoshi Tanaka	April 17, 2011
495	39	"I Won't Run! Ace's Desperate Rescue Operation!"; Transliteration: "Ore wa Nigenai – Ēsu Kesshi no Kyūshutsu Sakusen" (Japanese: おれは逃げない エース決死の救出作戦)	Yoshihiro Ueda	Hirohiko Kamisaka	April 24, 2011
496	40	"To The Sea Someday! The Pledge of the Three Brats!"; Transliteration: "Itsuka Umi e! San'nin no Akudō Chikai no Sakazuki!" (Japanese: いつか海へ! 三人の悪童ちかいの盃!)	Yutaka Nakashima	Yoshiyuki Suga	May 1, 2011
497	41	"Leaving the Dadan Family for Good?! The Kids' Hideout Has Been Built!"; Transliteration: "Dadan Ikka to no Wakare!? Kansei! Himitsu Kichi" (Japanese: ダダン一家との別れ!? 完成! 秘密基地)	Gō Koga	Hitoshi Tanaka	May 8, 2011
498	42	"Luffy Becoming an Apprentice?! A Man Who Fought Against the King of the Pirates!"; Transliteration: "Rufi Deshi-iri!? Kaizoku-Ō to Tatakatta Otoko!" (Japanese: ルフィ弟子入り!? 海賊王と戦った男!)	Takahiro Imamura	Hirohiko Kamisaka	May 15, 2011
499	43	"The Battle against the Big Tiger! Who is Going to be Captain?!"; Transliteration: "Ōtora to no Kessen! Senchō ni Naru no wa Dare da!" (Japanese: 大虎との決戦! 船長になるのは誰だ!)	Hiroaki Miyamoto	Hirohiko Kamisaka	May 22, 2011
500	44	"Freedom Taken Away! The Nobles' Plot Closing in on the Brothers!"; Transliteration: "Ubawareta Jiyū! Sankyōdai ni Semaru Kizoku no Wana" (Japanese: 奪われた自由! 三兄弟に迫る貴族の罠)	Makoto Sonoda	Yoshiyuki Suga	May 29, 2011
501	45	"The Fire Has Been Set! The Gray Terminal in Crisis!"; Transliteration: "Hanatareta Honō – Gurei Tāminaru no Kiki" (Japanese: 放たれた炎 グレイ・ターミナルの危機)	Yoshihiro Ueda	Hitoshi Tanaka	June 5, 2011
502	46	"Where Can Freedom be Found? A Sad Departure of a Boy!"; Transliteration: "Jiyū wa Doko ni Aru? Shōnen no Kanashiki Funade" (Japanese: 自由はどこにある? 少年の悲しき船出)	Katsumi Tokoro	Hirohiko Kamisaka	June 12, 2011
503	47	"Take Good Care of Him! A Letter from the Brother!"; Transliteration: "Yoroshiku Tanomu! Kyōdai kara Todoita Tegami!" (Japanese: よろしく頼む! 兄弟から届いた手紙!)	Aya Komaki	Yoshiyuki Suga	June 19, 2011
504	48	"To Live Up to the Promise! Departures of Their Own!"; Transliteration: "Yakusoku o Hatasu Tame – Sorezore no Tabidachi!" (Japanese: 約束を果たすため それぞれの旅立ち!)	Yutaka Nakashima	Hitoshi Tanaka	June 26, 2011
505	49	"I Want to See Them! Luffy's Mournful Cry!"; Transliteration: "Aitsura ni Aitē! Rufi Namida no Sakebi" (Japanese: あいつらに会いてェ! ルフィ涙の叫び)	Yoshihiro Ueda	Yoshiyuki Suga	July 3, 2011
506	50	"Straw Hats in Shock! The Bad News Has Reached Them!"; Transliteration: "Mugiwara no Ichimi Gekishin! Motarasareta Kyōhō" (Japanese: 麦わらの一味激震! もたらされた凶報)	Gō Koga	Hitoshi Tanaka	July 10, 2011
507	51	"Reunited with Dark King Rayleigh! Decision Time for Luffy!"; Transliteration: "Meiō Reirī to no Saikai – Rufi Ketsudan no Toki" (Japanese: 冥王レイリーとの再会 ルフィ決断の時)	Takahiro Imamura	Tomohiro Nakayama	July 17, 2011
508	52	"Back to Our Captain! A Jail Break at the Sky Island and the Incident on the Winter Island!"; Transliteration: "Senchō no Moto e – Sorajima no Datsugoku to Fuyujima no Jiken" (Japanese: 船長のもとへ 空島の脱獄と冬島の事件)	Katsumi Tokoro	Hirohiko Kamisaka	July 31, 2011
509	53	"Encounter! The Great Swordsman Mihawk! Zoro's Self-Willed Deadly Struggle!"; Transliteration: "Sesshoku! Daikengō Mihōku – Zoro Iji no Shitō" (Japanese: 接触! 大剣豪ミホーク ゾロ意地の死闘)	Yoshihiro Ueda	Yoshiyuki Suga	August 7, 2011
510	54	"A Disaster for Sanji! The Queen's Return to the Kingdom!"; Transliteration: "Sanji no Junan – Ōkoku e to Kikanshita Joō!" (Japanese: サンジの受難 王国へと帰還した女王!)	Yoshihiro Ueda	Tomohiro Nakayama	August 14, 2011
511	55	"Unexpected Relanding! Luffy, to Marineford!"; Transliteration: "Masaka no Saijōriku! Rufi Marinfōdo e!" (Japanese: まさかの再上陸! ルフィ海軍本部へ!)	Makoto Sonoda	Hitoshi Tanaka	August 21, 2011
512	56	"With Hopes It Will Reach My Friends! Big News Spreading Fast!"; Transliteration: "Nakama ni Todoke – Kakemeguru Dai-nyūsu!" (Japanese: 仲間に届け かけめぐる大ニュース!)	Yutaka Nakashima	Hirohiko Kamisaka	August 28, 2011
513	57	"Pirates Get on the Move! Astounding New World!"; Transliteration: "Ugokidasu Kaizoku-tachi! Kyōtendōchi no Shinsekai" (Japanese: 動き出す海賊たち! 驚天動地の新世界)	Hiroyuki Satō	Yoshiyuki Suga	September 4, 2011
514	58	"Living through Hell! Sanji's Fight for His Manhood!"; Transliteration: "Jigoku o Ikinuke – Sanji Otoko o Kaketa Shōbu" (Japanese: 地獄を生き抜け サンジ男をかけた勝負)	Aya Komaki	Hitoshi Tanaka	September 11, 2011
515	59	"I Will Get Much, Much Stronger! Zoro's Pledge to his Captain!"; Transliteration: "Madamada Tsuyoku Naru! Zoro Senchō e no Chikai" (Japanese: まだまだ強くなる! ゾロ船長への誓い)	Yoshihiro Ueda	Tomohiro Nakayama	September 18, 2011
516	60	"Luffy's Training Begins! To the Place We Promised in 2 Years!"; Transliteration: "Rufi Shugyō Kaishi – Ninengo ni Yakusoku no Basho de" (Japanese: ルフィ修行開始 2年後に約束の場所で)	Katsumi Tokoro	Hirohiko Kamisaka	September 25, 2011

== OVAs ==
No.	Title	Original release date
2	"Romance Dawn Story"; Transliteration: "Romansu Dōn Sutōrī" (Japanese: ロマンス ドーン ストーリー)	September 21, 2008
In search for food for his crew, Luffy arrives at a port town, defeating a pirate named Crescent Moon Gally on the way. He meets a girl named Silk in town, who was abandoned by attacking pirates as a baby and raised by the mayor, which has caused her to value the town as her "treasure". The villagers mistake Luffy for Gally and capture him just as the real Gally returns. Gally throws Luffy in the water and plans to destroy the town, but Silk saves him and Luffy goes after Gally. His crew arrives to help him, and with his help, he recovers the treasure for the town, gets some food, and destroys Gally's ship.
3	"Strong World: Episode 0"; Transliteration: "Sutorongu Wārudo: Episōdo Zero" (Japanese: ストロングワールド Episode 0)	December 12, 2009
The introductory chapter to the movie, Strong World, which depicts the events surrounding Gold Roger's execution.

== Releases ==
=== Japanese ===
==== DVD ====
Avex Pictures (Japan, Region 2)
Volume		Episodes	Release date	Ref.
9thシーズン エニエス·ロビー篇	piece.01	264–266	January 9, 2008	
9thシーズン エニエス·ロビー篇	piece.02	267–269	February 6, 2008	
9thシーズン エニエス·ロビー篇	piece.03	270–272	March 5, 2008	
9thシーズン エニエス·ロビー篇	piece.04	273–275	April 2, 2008	
9thシーズン エニエス·ロビー篇	piece.05	276–278	May 7, 2008	
9thシーズン エニエス·ロビー篇	piece.06	284–286	June 4, 2008	
9thシーズン エニエス·ロビー篇	piece.07	287–289	July 7, 2008	
9thシーズン エニエス·ロビー篇	piece.08	290, 293–294	August 6, 2008	
9thシーズン エニエス·ロビー篇	piece.09	295–297	September 3, 2008	
9thシーズン エニエス·ロビー篇	piece.10	298–300	October 1, 2008	
9thシーズン エニエス·ロビー篇	piece.11	301–302, 304	November 5, 2008	
9thシーズン エニエス·ロビー篇	piece.12	305–307	December 3, 2008	
9thシーズン エニエス·ロビー篇	piece.13	308–310	January 7, 2009	
9thシーズン エニエス·ロビー篇	piece.14	311–313	February 4, 2009	
9thシーズン エニエス·ロビー篇	piece.15	314–316	March 4, 2009	
9thシーズン エニエス·ロビー篇	piece.16	317–319	April 1, 2009	
9thシーズン エニエス·ロビー篇	piece.17	320–322	May 13, 2009	
9thシーズン エニエス·ロビー篇	piece.18	323–325	June 6, 2009	
9thシーズン エニエス·ロビー篇	piece.19	326–328	July 1, 2009	
9thシーズン エニエス·ロビー篇	piece.20	329–331	August 5, 2009	
9thシーズン エニエス·ロビー篇	piece.21	332–335	September 2, 2009	
10thシーズン スリラーバーク篇	piece.01	337–339	October 7, 2009	
10thシーズン スリラーバーク篇	piece.02	340–342	November 6, 2009	
10thシーズン スリラーバーク篇	piece.03	343–345	December 2, 2009	
10thシーズン スリラーバーク篇	piece.04	346–348	January 6, 2010	
10thシーズン スリラーバーク篇	piece.05	349–351	February 3, 2010	
10thシーズン スリラーバーク篇	piece.06	352–354	March 3, 2010	
10thシーズン スリラーバーク篇	piece.07	355–357	April 7, 2010	
10thシーズン スリラーバーク篇	piece.08	358–360	May 7, 2010	
10thシーズン スリラーバーク篇	piece.09	361–363	June 2, 2010	
10thシーズン スリラーバーク篇	piece.10	364–366	July 7, 2010	
10thシーズン スリラーバーク篇	piece.11	367–369	August 4, 2010	
10thシーズン スリラーバーク篇	piece.12	370–372	September 1, 2010	
10thシーズン スリラーバーク篇	piece.13	373–375	October 6, 2010	
10thシーズン スリラーバーク篇	piece.14	376–378	November 5, 2010	
10thシーズン スリラーバーク篇	piece.15	379–381	December 12, 2010	
11thシーズン シャボンディ諸島篇	piece.01	382–385	January 7, 2011	
11thシーズン シャボンディ諸島篇	piece.02	386–389	January 7, 2011	
11thシーズン シャボンディ諸島篇	piece.03	390–393	February 2, 2011	
11thシーズン シャボンディ諸島篇	piece.04	394–397	February 2, 2011	
11thシーズン シャボンディ諸島篇	piece.05	398–401	March 2, 2011	
11thシーズン シャボンディ諸島篇	piece.06	402–405	March 2, 2011	
12thシーズン 女ヶ島篇	piece.01	408–411	April 6, 2011	
12thシーズン 女ヶ島篇	piece.02	412–415	April 6, 2011	
12thシーズン 女ヶ島篇	piece.03	416–418	May 11, 2011	
12thシーズン 女ヶ島篇	piece.04	419–421	May 11, 2011	
13thシーズン インペルダウン篇	piece.01	422–425	June 1, 2011	
13thシーズン インペルダウン篇	piece.02	430–433	June 1, 2011	
13thシーズン インペルダウン篇	piece.03	434–437	July 6, 2011	
13thシーズン インペルダウン篇	piece.04	438–441	July 6, 2011	
13thシーズン インペルダウン篇	piece.05	442–445	August 3, 2011	
13thシーズン インペルダウン篇	piece.06	446–449	August 3, 2011	
13thシーズン インペルダウン篇	piece.07	450–453	September 7, 2011	
13thシーズン インペルダウン篇	piece.08	454–458	September 7, 2011	
14THシーズン マリンフォード編	piece.01	459–462	October 5, 2011	
14THシーズン マリンフォード編	piece.02	463–466	November 2, 2011	
14THシーズン マリンフォード編	piece.03	467–470	December 7, 2011	
14THシーズン マリンフォード編	piece.04	471–474	January 11, 2012	
14THシーズン マリンフォード編	piece.05	475–478	February 1, 2012	
14THシーズン マリンフォード編	piece.06	479–482	March 3, 2012	
14THシーズン マリンフォード編	piece.07	483–486	April 4, 2012	
14THシーズン マリンフォード編	piece.08	487–490	May 9, 2012	
14THシーズン マリンフォード編	piece.09	491, 493–495	June 6, 2012	
14THシーズン マリンフォード編	piece.10	496–499	July 4, 2012	
14THシーズン マリンフォード編	piece.11	500–503	August 1, 2012	
14THシーズン マリンフォード編	piece.12	504–507	September 5, 2012	
14THシーズン マリンフォード編	piece.13	508–511	October 3, 2012	
14THシーズン マリンフォード編	piece.14	512–516	November 11, 2012	
時代劇SP｢ルフィ親分捕物帖2｣通常版		291–292, 303	August 1, 2007	
9thシーズン特別篇「麦わら劇場&麦わら海賊譚」		279–283	May 23, 2008	
ONE PIECE FILM STRONG WORLD 連動特別篇 金獅子の野望		426–429	July 23, 2010	
ONE PIECE ワンピース・ヒーロースペシャル!		336, 492	November 21, 2011	
ワンピース時代劇スペシャル『麦わらのルフィ親分捕物帖3』		406–407	October 26, 2012	
トリコ×ワンピース コラボスペシャル完全版		492, 542	October 26, 2012	
ONE PIECE Log Collection	"NICO ROBIN"	264–278, 284	July 27, 2012	
ONE PIECE Log Collection	"CP9"	285–290, 293–302, 304–306	July 27, 2012	
ONE PIECE Log Collection	"FRANKY"	307–325	August 24, 2012	
ONE PIECE Log Collection	"THRILLER BARK"	337–349	August 24, 2012	
ONE PIECE Log Collection	"OARS"	350–363	December 21, 2012	
ONE PIECE Log Collection	"BROOK"	364–381	December 21, 2012	
ONE PIECE Log Collection	"SHABODY"	384–393	July 26, 2013	
ONE PIECE Log Collection	"ROOKIES"	394–405	August 23, 2013	
ONE PIECE Log Collection	"HANCOCK"	408–421	December 20, 2013	
ONE PIECE Log Collection	"IMPEL DOWN"	422–425, 430-441	July 25, 2014	
ONE PIECE Log Collection	"MAGELLAN"	442–458	July 25, 2014	
ONE PIECE Log Collection	"MARINEFORD"	459–476	August 22, 2014	
ONE PIECE Log Collection	"ACE"	477-491, 493–496	August 22, 2014	
ONE PIECE Log Collection	"PROMISE"	497–516	September 26, 2014	
ONE PIECE Log Collection Special	"JIDAIGEKI"	SP4, 291-292, 303, 406-407	October 23, 2015	

=== English ===
In Australia, the Season releases are named Collection 22 through 42 and the Collection Boxes are named Treasure Chest Collections.

Funimation Entertainment (USA, Region 1), Manga Entertainment (UK, Region 2), Madman Entertainment (Australia, Region 4)
Volume		Episodes	Release date			ISBN	Ref.
Volume		Episodes	USA	UK	Australia	ISBN	Ref.
Season Five	Voyage One	264–275	July 23, 2013	N/A	September 18, 2013	ISBN N/A	
Season Five	Voyage Two	276–287	September 3, 2013	N/A	November 20, 2013	ISBN N/A	
Season Five	Voyage Three	288–299	October 15, 2013	N/A	February 19, 2014	ISBN N/A	
Season Five	Voyage Four	300–312	December 3, 2013	N/A	May 21, 2014	ISBN N/A	
Season Five	Voyage Five	313–324	January 14, 2014	N/A	June 18, 2014	ISBN N/A	
Season Five	Voyage Six	325–336	March 4, 2014	N/A	July 23, 2014	ISBN N/A	
Season Six	Voyage One	337–348	September 30, 2014	N/A	January 7, 2015	ISBN N/A	
Season Six	Voyage Two	349–360	November 18, 2014	N/A	February 18, 2015	ISBN N/A	
Season Six	Voyage Three	361–372	January 13, 2015	N/A	May 20, 2015	ISBN N/A	
Season Six	Voyage Four	373–384	April 7, 2015	N/A	June 10, 2015	ISBN N/A	
Season Seven	Voyage One	385–396	July 14, 2015	N/A	September 9, 2015	ISBN N/A	
Season Seven	Voyage Two	397–409	September 1, 2015	N/A	November 18, 2015	ISBN N/A	
Season Seven	Voyage Three	410–421	October 27, 2015	N/A	January 13, 2016	ISBN N/A	
Season Seven	Voyage Four	422–433	December 15, 2015	N/A	March 2, 2016	ISBN N/A	
Season Seven	Voyage Five	434–445	January 26, 2016	N/A	April 4, 2016	ISBN N/A	
Season Seven	Voyage Six	446–456	April 26, 2016	N/A	July 6, 2016	ISBN N/A	
Season Eight	Voyage One	457–468	May 31, 2016	N/A	October 5, 2016	ISBN N/A	
Season Eight	Voyage Two	469–480	July 26, 2016	N/A	November 2, 2016	ISBN N/A	
Season Eight	Voyage Three	481–491	September 20, 2016	N/A	December 7, 2016	ISBN N/A	
Season Eight	Voyage Four	493–504	November 8, 2016	N/A	January 11, 2017	ISBN N/A	
Season Eight	Voyage Five	505–516	December 13, 2016	N/A	March 8, 2017	ISBN N/A	
Collection	11	253–275	February 3, 2015	August 10, 2015	N/A	ISBN N/A	
Collection	12	276–299	April 21, 2015	December 28, 2015	N/A	ISBN N/A	
Collection	13	300–324	July 14, 2015	March 28, 2016	N/A	ISBN N/A	
Collection	14	325–348	November 10, 2015	July 25, 2016	N/A	ISBN N/A	
Collection	15	349–372	March 22, 2016	January 23, 2017	N/A	ISBN N/A	
Collection	16	373–396	June 28, 2016	March 27, 2017	N/A	ISBN N/A	
Collection	17	397–421	October 11, 2016	June 25, 2018	N/A	ISBN N/A	
Collection	18	422–445	February 14, 2017	August 20, 2018	N/A	ISBN N/A	
Collection	19	446–468	May 23, 2017	October 22, 2018	N/A	ISBN N/A	
Collection	20	469–491	September 19, 2017	December 17, 2018	N/A	ISBN N/A	
Collection	21	493–516	December 5, 2017	March 16, 2020	N/A	ISBN N/A	
Collection Box	Three	206–299	March 31, 2015	N/A	December 7, 2016	ISBN N/A	
Collection Box	Four	300–396	N/A		December 7, 2016	ISBN N/A	
Collection Box	Five	397–491	N/A		September 6, 2017	ISBN N/A	
Voyage Collection	6	253–299	N/A		January 10, 2018	ISBN N/A	
Voyage Collection	7	300–348	N/A		February 21, 2018	ISBN N/A	
Voyage Collection	8	349–396	N/A		March 7, 2018	ISBN N/A	
Voyage Collection	9	397–445	N/A		May 9, 2018	ISBN N/A	
Voyage Collection	10	446–491	N/A		July 4, 2018	ISBN N/A	
