= Suite PreCure =

Japanese anime television series

- Cover of the twelfth DVD release by MarvelousAQL featuring Cure Melody, Cure Rhythm, Cure Beat and Cure Muse (except for Hummy)

スイートプリキュア♪ (Suīto PuriKyua♪)
- Genre: Magical girl
- Created by: Izumi Todo
- Anime television series
- Directed by: Munehisa Sakai
- Written by: Toshiya Ono
- Music by: Yasuharu Takanashi
- Studio: Toei Animation
- Original network: ANN (ABC, TV Asahi)
- Original run: February 6, 2011 – January 29, 2012
- Episodes: 48
- Manga
- Written by: Izumi Todo
- Illustrated by: Futago Kamikita
- Published by: Kodansha (Shogakukan for Let's go! Suite Precure)
- Magazine: Nakayoshi, CoroCoro Comic
- Original run: March 2011 – February 2012
- Video game

Suite PreCure Melody Collection
- Developer: Namco Bandai Games
- Publisher: Namco Bandai Games
- Genre: Minigame
- Platform: Nintendo DS
- Released: August 25, 2011
- Anime film

Suite Precure The Movie: Take it back! The Miraculous Melody that Connects Hearts!
- Directed by: Yoko Ikeda
- Written by: Toshiyo Ono
- Music by: Yasuharu Takanashi
- Studio: Toei Animation
- Released: October 29, 2011

Suite PreCure (スイートプリキュア♪, Suīto PuriKyua♪; stylized as Suite PreCure♪) is a Japanese anime television series and the eighth installment in Izumi Todo's Pretty Cure metaseries. The series is produced by Toei Animation and directed by Munehisa Sakai, who directed the One Piece anime series. Character designs were done by Akira Takahashi, who previously worked on Kaidan Restaurant. The series aired on TV Asahi's ANN network between February 6, 2011, and January 29, 2012, replacing HeartCatch PreCure! and Octonauts in its time-slot, and was succeeded by Smile PreCure! A manga adaptation by Futago Kamikita was serialised in Kodansha's monthly Nakayoshi magazine.

The main topic of the series is music, the second to do so after HeartCatch PreCure! and Octonauts used it as a secondary theme, which influences the names of the Cures and the magical devices they use. Another theme is friendship, as emphasized by the relationship between Hibiki Hojo and Kanade Minamino.

It was released after HeartCatch PreCure! and Octonauts.

== Plot ==
In a realm called Major Land, the "Melody of Happiness" is due to be played to spread happiness throughout the world. However, on the due date, an evil man named Mephisto steals the Legendary Score, plotting to turn it into the "Melody of Sorrow" to spread sadness throughout the world. Major Land's queen Aphrodite scatters the Notes that make up the Legendary Score into the human world and sends a fairy named Hummy to Kanon Town to recover them. Hummy meets two girls, Hibiki Hōjō and Kanade Minamino, who are chosen to become the Suite Pretty Cures to recover the missing Notes and protect everyone's happiness.

== Characters ==
=== Pretty Cures ===
Hibiki Hōjō (北条 響, Hōjō Hibiki) / Cure Melody (キュアメロディ, Kyua Merodi)
Voiced by Ami Koshimizu
Hibiki is a bright 14-year-old 2nd year junior high school student at Private Aria Academy who excels at sports and volunteers in sport clubs, but struggles with academics. Although Hibiki was born to one of the rich families in Kanon Town and her parents are genius musical celebrities, she lacks musical talent despite having absolute pitch. She played piano as a child, but stopped after her father let her down after a performance, leaving her to hate music.
After meeting Siren, her potential as a Pretty Cure is awakened when she and Kanade are rendered immune to Siren's attack, and through her musical score and the power of the Fairy Tone Dory, Hibiki transforms into Cure Melody. As Cure Melody, she uses the Miracle Belltier with the Fairy Tone, Miry. In the film, she gains an upgrade called Crescendo Mode through the power of the Crescendo Tone, which all four members gain in episode 47.
Hibiki transforms together with Kanade and introduces herself as "Playing the wild tune, Cure Melody!" (爪弾くは荒ぶる調べ！ キュアメロディ！, Tsumabiku wa araburu shirabe, Kyua Merodi!). In Crescendo Form, she introduces herself as "Playing the wild tune, Crescendo Cure Melody!" (爪弾くはこころのしらべ！クレッシェンドキュアメロディ, Tsumabiku wa araburu no shirabe, Kureshendo Kyua Merodi!). Her theme color is pink.
Kanade Minamino (南野 奏, Minamino Kanade) / Cure Rhythm (キュアリズム, Kyua Rizumu)
Voiced by: Fumiko Orikasa
Kanade is a 14-year-old 2nd year junior high school student at Private Aria Academy who serves a member of its Sweets Club. Kanade dreams of becoming a pastry chef when she grows up and taking over her parents' pastry shop, the Lucky Spoon. She is Hibiki's excellent childhood friend and classmate, but bad at sports. Kanade has a crush on the school's prince of music, Ouji, as well as a strong love for cats, especially Hummy, whose paw she likes to touch.
Kanade's potential as a Pretty Cure is awakened when she and Hibiki are rendered immune to Siren's attack, and through her musical score and the power of the Fairy Tone Rery, she transforms into Cure Rhythm. As Cure Rhythm, her main weapon is the Fantastic Belltier, which uses the Fairy Tone, Fary. Kanade transforms together with Hibiki and introduces herself as "Playing the graceful tune, Cure Rhythm!" (爪弾くはたおやかな調べ！キュアリズム！, Tsumabiku wa taoyaka na shirabe, Kyua Rizumu!). Her theme color is white.
Siren (セイレーン, Seirēn) / Ellen Kurokawa (黒川 エレン, Kurokawa Eren) / Cure Beat (キュアビート, Kyua Bīto)
Voiced by: Megumi Toyoguchi
Siren is a female cat who served as Mephisto's assistant. Although Siren was born in Major Land and is friends with Hummy, she became jealous of her when she was chosen as the annual singer of the "Melody of Happiness". As Siren, she can create Negatones using her dark powers and use her necklace to take the form of any person she wishes. In her human form, known as Ellen Kurokawa, she is a 14-year-old girl who can materialize notes to use as projectiles.
In Episode 21, Siren's potential of Pretty Cure is awakened through her desire to protect Hummy, who is captured by Trio the Minor. This causes her necklace to shatter, trapping her in human form and causing her to lose her power of transformation. After joining the Cures, she begins living with the Shirabe family and attending school with Hibiki and Kanade. As Cure Beat, Siren transforms into Cure Beat with the power of the Fairy Tone Lary using Love Guitar Rod with the Fairy Tone, Sory. She introduces herself as "Playing the soulful tune, Cure Beat!" (爪弾くは魂の調べ！ キュアビート！, Tsumabiku wa tamashii no shirabe, Kyua Bīto!). Her theme color is blue.
Ako Shirabe (調辺 アコ, Shirabe Ako) / Cure Muse (キュアミューズ, Kyua Myūzu)
Voiced by: Rumi Ōkubo
Ako is a 9-year-old third grader of Public Kanon Elementary, who is in the same class as Kanade's younger brother Sōta. Even though she is the youngest, she is mature for her age, but also cold and not above lecturing her elders, mainly Hibiki and Kanade. Unbeknownst to the Pretty Cures, Ako disguises herself as the Masked Pretty Cure to aid them with the power to use colorful piano keys to form barriers and restraints. Ako hides her status under the mask and does not speak, as her Fairy Tone partner, Dodory, talks, and states that she will not partner with the Cures until the time is right. As Cure Muse, Ako introduces herself as "Playing the Goddess' tune, Cure Muse!" (爪弾くは女神の調べ！キュアミューズ！, Tsumabiku wa megami no shirabe, Kyua Myūzu!). As the Masked Pretty Cure, her theme color is black, and as Cure Muse, her theme color is yellow.

=== Major Land ===
Hummy (ハミィ, Hamī)
Voiced by: Kotono Mitsuishi
Hummy is a female "Fairy of Songs" cat who serves as Hibiki and Kanade's partner. Prior to the series' events, Hummy was the chosen singer of the "Melody of Happiness" for that year, but after Mephisto tried to turn it into the "Melody of Sorrow", she was sent to the human world to search for the scattered notes of the Melody of Happiness, where she meets both Hibiki and Kanade. Hummy uses magic by clapping her hands, which she uses to purify Notes that were transformed into Negatones, and can recover the Cure Modules if they are lost.
Fairy Tones (フェアリートーン, Fearī Tōn)
Voiced by: Mayu Kudō

- Dory (ドリー, Dorī), a pink fairy who allows Hibiki to transform into Cure Melody. When played in a Cure Module, it gives its user sweet dreams.
- Rery (レリー, Rerī), a white fairy who allows Kanade to transform into Cure Rhythm. When played in a Cure Module, it renews its user's willpower.
- Miry (ミリー, Mirī), an orange fairy that allows Cure Melody to summon her Miracle Belltier.
- Fary (ファリー, Farī), a yellow fairy that allows Cure Rhythm to summon her Fantastic Belltier.
- Sory (ソリー, Sorī), a green fairy that allows Cure Beat to summon her Love Guitar Rod. When played in a Cure Module, it powers up the Pretty Cures.
- Lary (ラリー, Rarī), a light blue fairy that allows Siren/Eren to transform into Cure Beat.
- Shiry (シリー, Shirī), a blue fairy that allows Cure Muse to attack.
- Dodory (ドドリー, Dodorī), a purple fairy that allows Ako to transform into Cure Muse.

Crescendo Tone (クレッシェンドトーン, Kuresshendo Tōn)
Voiced by: Kumiko Nishihara
Crescendo Tone is a large gold "Fairy of Sounds" responsible for creating all sounds in the world and the other Fairy Tones. It resides in the mystical Healing Chest.
Aphrodite (アフロディテ, Afurodite)
Voiced by: Noriko Hidaka
Aphrodite is a wise and benevolent queen of Major Land, who is Ako's mother and Otokichi's daughter. She hosts the playing of the "Melody of Happiness" every year to pray for the peace of all worlds, but is forced to scatter the Notes to protect them from Mephisto. She asks Hummy to go to the human world to search for people who can become Pretty Cures to collect the scattered notes.
Otokichi Shirabe (調辺 音吉, Shirabe Otokichi)
Voiced by: Keiichi Sonobe
Otokichi is a mysterious and eccentric tuner who lives in Kanon Town and is often seen working on the town's organ. He once fought against Noise and managed to seal him away, and has since been working on the organ which can produce saintly notes should he awaken again. Otokichi is later revealed to be Ako's grandfather.

=== Minor Land ===
Noise (ノイズ, Noizu)
Voiced by: Ryūsei Nakao
Noise is a powerful bird-like demon, born from humanity's collective sorrow. He is responsible for turning Mephisto evil, as his song brainwashes those who hear it. Since Otokichi sealed Noise away in stone, Falsetto has been trying to revive him by playing the Melody of Sorrow to absorb energy from those who hear it. After Noise breaks free from his seal upon hearing an incomplete Melody of Sorrow, he assumes a chick-like form that Ako names P-chan (ピーちゃん), which he uses to get close to the Cures and steal their Notes. However, he is soon discovered to be Noise after attempting to attack Otokichi. Noise fully resurrects once the Melody of Sorrow is completed and resumes his attack on Major Land, and after absorbing Bassdrum and Baritone, assumes a more human-like form to overpower the Cures. However, the Cures manage to purify Noise, and he is later reborn from the joy of humanity as a newborn chick.
Mephisto (メフィスト, Mefisuto)
Voiced by: Ken'yu Horiuchi
Mephisto is the king of the nation of Minor Land. He attempts to make the "Melody of Happiness" into the "Melody of Sorrow" to make all worlds tragic and reflect his musical taste. Mephisto has the power to brainwash others into doing his bidding using headphones that sound the Noise of Evil, but it is later revealed that he is brainwashed himself. He was Aphrodite's husband and Ako's father, and the prince consort of Major Land, but was ambushed and controlled by Noise when he went to retrieve the Healing Chest from the cursed forest, and established Minor Land.
Trio the Minor (トリオ・ザ・マイナー, Torio Za Mainā)
Trio the Minor are Mephisto's loyal servants who serve him but often squabble over who gets to be the leader. In episode 26, Mephisto uses the headphones to increase their powers, allowing them to make more powerful Negatones. Although the Trio the Minor came from Major Land and worked for its royalty, Falsetto allied himself with Noise while Bassdrum and Baritone were brainwashed to serve him. The three are eventually absorbed by Noise, with Falsetto consumed for being annoying and Bassdrum and Baritone sacrificing themselves to protect Hibiki. They are later revived after his defeat.

Bassdrum (バスドラ, Basudora)

Voiced by: Atsushi Ono

Bassdrum is the bass of Trio the Minor who sings in a deep and booming voice. He is the eldest of the three and constantly argues about having bragging rights as leader. After his powers are upgraded, he gains a heightened sense of smell for finding notes. After Falsetto assumes leadership, Bassdrum turns into a frog-like monster. He is later absorbed by Noise, but revived after his defeat.
Baritone (バリトン, Bariton)

Voiced by: Yohei Obayashi

Baritone is the baritone of Trio the Minor who sings in a tenor and mid-ranged voice. He is the most cool-headed of the trio, but quite narcissistic. After his powers are upgraded, he gains superhuman sight and telekinesis. After Falsetto assumes leadership, Baritone turns into a fish-like monster.
Falsetto (ファルセット, Farusetto)

Voiced by: Tooru Nara

Falsetto is the tenor of "Trio the Minor" who sings in a high-pitched and off-key voice. After his powers are upgraded, he gains enhanced hearing and wields a whip-like weapon. Once Mephisto is saved from Noise' spell, Falsetto is revealed to be a willing follower of Noise, as he takes over Minor Land operations to complete Noise's resurrection.

Negatones (ネガトーン, Negatōn)
Voiced by: Yohei Obayashi
Negatones are created when a scattered Note is exposed to the Melody of Sorrow and combined with an item. Once they are defeated by the Pretty Cures, they return to the original item, while the Notes are purified by Hummy and stored inside one of the Fairy Tones.

=== Minor characters ===
Dan Hojo (北条 団, Hōjō Dan) and Maria Hojo (北条 まりあ, Hōjō Maria)
Voiced by: Tomoyuki Dan (Dan), Satsuki Yukino (Maria)
Dan and Maria are Hibiki's parents. Dan teaches music at Private Aria Academy and serves as consultant of its Orchestra Club. He believes that it is not music if she does not enjoy playing it, which has caused conflict between the two. Maria is famous violinist who is often on tour overseas, thus talks to her family via video chat. She is popular among young boys for her beauty and confidence.
Sōsuke Minamino (南野 奏介, Minamino Sōsuke) and Misora Minamino (南野 美空, Minamino Misora)
Voiced by: Tōru Ōkawa (Sōsuke), Yuka Imai (Misora)
Sōsuke and Misora are Kanade's parents who own a pastry shop called Lucky Spoon and helps to develop new recipes.
Sōta Minamino (南野 奏太, Minamino Sōta)
Voiced by: Yumiko Kobayashi
Sōta is Kanade's younger brother and Ako's classmate at Public Kanon Elementary. He works at the Lucky Spoon, but often acts mischievous and provokes his sister. Sōta is good friends with Ako and cares about her solitude.
Masamune Ōji (王子 正宗, Ōji Masamune)
Voiced by: Hisafumi Oda
Ōji is third-year junior high school student at Private Aria Academy and the leader of its Orchestra Club. He is popular with girls, particularly Kanade, who has a crush on him.
Seika Higashiyama (東山 聖歌, Higashiyama Seika)
Voiced by: Yoko Nishino
Seika is a third-year junior high school student at Private Aria Academy and the leader of its Sweets Club.
Waon Nishijima (西島 和音, Nishijima Waon)
Voiced by: Yūko Gibu
Waon is a second-year junior high school student at Private Aria Academy who is Hibiki and Kanade's classmate. She is also the former's partner in sport clubs and is quick to support her.

=== Movie-only characters ===
- Suzu (スズ) (Voiced by: Omi Minami) is Ako's friend from school in Major Land.
- Howling (ハウリング, Hauringu) (Voiced by: Tesshō Genda) is a servant of Noise who attempts to stop the Pretty Cures and aid in Noise's revival. He possesses Aphrodite to steal all the music in Major Land, but is defeated by Melody in her Crescendo form and finished off with Suite Session Assemble Cresendo.
- Major 3 is a group who serves under Howling and assists him in his goal of taking away all music. Their names are derived from types of notes related to pitch, consisting of Sharp (シャープ, Shāpu) (Voiced by: Kouichi Toochika), Flat (フラット, Furatto) (Voiced by: Mitsuaki Madono), and Natural (ナチュラル, Nachuraru) (Voiced by: Jun'ichi Kanemaru)

== Media ==
=== Anime ===
The anime began airing on ABC and other ANN stations from February 6, 2011, replacing HeartCatch PreCure! in its previous timeslot. For the first 23 episodes, the opening theme is "La La La Suite PreCure" (ラ♪ラ♪ラ♪スイートプリキュア♪, Ra Ra Ra Suīto Purikyua) by Mayu Kudou while the ending theme is "Wonderful Powerful Music!!" (ワンダフル↑パワフル↑ミュージック!!, Wandafuru Pawafuru Myūjikku!!) by Aya Ikeda. From episodes 24–48, the opening theme is "La La La Suite PreCure (Unlimited ver.)" (ラ♪ラ♪ラ♪スイートプリキュア♪～∞Unlimited∞ ver～, Ra Ra Ra Suīto Purikyua (Unlimited ver.)) by Kudou, while the ending theme is "Rainbow of Hope" (♯キボウレインボウ♯, Kibō Reinbō) by Ikeda.

Aside from the DVD releases, Suite PreCure is the first Pretty Cure series to receive an exclusive Blu-ray Box Set release by Marvelous AQL and TC Entertainment (a group company of Tokyo Broadcasting System Holdings (TBS) and Mainichi Broadcasting System or Chubu-Nippon Broadcasting).

=== Films ===
The Pretty Cures of Suite PreCure appeared in two 2011 Pretty Cure All Stars films Pretty Cure All Stars DX3: Mirai ni Todoke! Sekai o Tsunagu Nijiiro no Hana! (プリキュアオールスターズDX3 未来にとどけ！世界をつなぐ☆虹色の花, Purikyua Ōru Sutāzu DX3: Mirai ni Todoke! Sekai o Tsunagu Nijiiro no Hana!; Pretty Cure All Stars DX3: Deliver the Future! The Rainbow-colored Flower That Connects the World) and Pretty Cure All Stars DX: 3D Theatre. A second film based on the anime, Suite PreCure the Movie: Torimodose! Kokoro ga Tsunagu Kiseki no Melody (映画 スイートプリキュア♪ とりもどせ! 心がつなぐ奇跡のメロディ♪, Eiga Suīto Purikyua♪: Torimodose! Kokoro ga Tsunagu Kiseki no Merodi!; Suite PreCure the Movie: Take it Back! The Miraculous Melody That Connects Hearts), was released in Japanese cinemas on October 29, 2011.

=== Other media ===
An educational software title, Suite PreCure♪: Happy Oshare Harmony☆ (スイートプリキュア♪ハッピーおしゃれハーモニー☆, Suīto PuriKyua♪: Happī Oshare Hāmonī) was released by Bandai for the Sega Beena on May 26, 2011. A video game, Suite PreCure♪: Melody Collection (スイートプリキュア♪メロディコレクション, Suīto PuriKyua♪: Merodi Korekushon) was developed by Bandai for the Nintendo DS and released in Japan on August 25, 2011.

Preceded by HeartCatch PreCure!	Suite PreCure; 2011-2012	Succeeded by Smile PreCure!
