= Mr Love: Queen's Choice =

2017 mobile game

- Video game
- Developer: Papergames
- Publisher: Papergames (CN); Elex (EN); Niki (JP)
- Music by: V.K
- Platform: iOS, Android
- Released: CN: December 14, 2017 (iOS); CN: December 20, 2017 (AND); EN (UK): March 20, 2019; EN (WW): May 20, 2019; JP: July 3, 2019
- Anime television series
- Directed by: Munehisa Sakai
- Produced by: Chen Jialin; Huang Zhiwei
- Written by: Kiyoko Yoshimura
- Music by: Yūsuke Katō
- Studio: MAPPA
- Original network: Tokyo MX, SUN, BS-NTV, AT-X
- Original run: July 15, 2020 – September 30, 2020
- Episodes: 12
- icon

Mr. Love: Queen's Choice (Chinese: 恋与制作人; pinyin: Liàn yǔ zhì zuò rén; lit. ''Love and Producer'') is a Chinese otome visual novel mobile game. It allows players to text, chat, and call the game's male love interests, while developing the player's own career as a media producer.

The game takes place in a fantasy setting, where the unnamed protagonist becomes involved with four male characters with superpowers. The game allows the player to choose which of the four characters to romantically pursue, with narrative choices throughout the game's chapters.

The game first released in Mainland China on December 14, 2017. It launched on March 20, 2019, on Google Play in the UK and two months later in other English-speaking territories. It was also released in Japan as Love and Producer ~EVOL×LOVE~ (Japanese: 恋とプロデューサー ～EVOL×LOVE～, Hepburn: Koi to Purodyūsā ～EVOL×LOVE～) on July 3, 2019 and in Southeast Asia as Mr Love: Dream Date. The game's global version was shut down on March 27, 2026, and other versions of the game will remain active.

An anime television series adaptation produced by MAPPA aired from July 15 to September 30, 2020.

== Gameplay ==
=== Main story ===
The player can read character dialogue and make choices to change the story in a visual novel format.

=== Phone system ===
The player can interact with the love interests via in-game text message apps and phone calls, as well as commenting on their online posts.

Messages and moments are unlocked when the player obtains certain karma cards, progress through the main story, and by increasing intimacy levels. Communicating with the love interests through the phone feature allows the player to increase the intimacy level of each character.

=== Company system ===
The player runs their own production studio in the game. The player will need to hire employees, produce television shows, and deal with emergencies.

Employees are called "Experts" and each comes with specific traits necessary to pass levels. Experts can be obtained by completing the storyline or in the "City News" shop.

=== Karma system ===
Karma are cards that the player obtains and uses in the main levels of the game. They have ultra-HD pictures and CG. Karma can have one of eight rankings: N, NH, R, ER, SR, SSR, SER, and SP.

== Characters ==
=== Main ===
Name	Biography	Special Ability	Voice actor
I (我 Wǒ / わたし Watashi)	The main female protagonist. She is a producer for an entertainment company who gets involved with the four main characters of the game.	Precognition	Japanese: Hisako Kanemoto (anime)
Xǔ Mò (许墨); Lucien; Simon (シモン Shimon)	Lucien is a famous neuroscientist who has had a high IQ since childhood. Unfortunately, his intelligence isolated him from his peers.	Replication	Chinese: Xia Lei; English: Bill Rogers → Anthony Hansen; Japanese: Daisuke Hirakawa
Bái Qǐ (白起); Gavin; Haku (ハク)	On the surface, Gavin is a police officer in Loveland. In reality, he is an Evol agent who often performs dangerous missions. He was a troublemaker in high school, but now is an excellent agent focused on superpower cases.	Wind Control: allows him to detect anything happening in the wind as well as being able to fly in it.	Chinese: Zhang Jie; English: Joe Zieja → Alan Adelberg; Japanese: Yūki Ono
Lǐ Zéyán (李泽言); Victor; Zen (ゼン)	Founder and CEO of Loveland Financial Group, Victor is a meticulous businessman. He established a business empire in just eight years. LFG employees said he was a workaholic and no one had ever seen his smile, but he seems to like animals.	Time control	Chinese: Wu Lei; English: Benjamin Diskin → Jonah Scott → Eliah Mountjoy; Japanese: Tomokazu Sugita
Zhōu QíLuò (周棋洛); Kiro; Kira (キラ)	Kiro is a famous and talented superstar. While confident and active, he's also easy-going and attaches great importance to his fans. He can be playful sometimes, but when a crisis comes, you will find him vigilant and observant.	Absolute Charm	Chinese: Bian Jiang; English: Sean Chiplock → Andrew Bates; Japanese: Tetsuya Kakihara
Líng Xiāo (凌肖); Shaw; Shō (ショウ)	Archaeology graduate student.	Thunder control	Chinese: Zhao Lu; English: Aleks Le → Eric Keitel; Japanese: Makoto Furukawa

=== Others ===
Name	Biography	Voice actor
Anna (安娜 Ānnà / アンナ)	A close colleague of the protagonist.	Japanese: Rina Satō
YuèYuè (悦悦); Kiki; Yui (ユイ)	An intern at the protagonist's company.	Japanese: Aoi Koga
Hán Yě (韩野); Minor; Kanya (カンヤ)	A high school classmate of Gavin's who comes to work at the protagonist's company.	Japanese: Yū Hayashi
Cindy; Receptionist Woman (受付嬢 Uketsuke Jō)		Japanese: Misato Fukuen
Wèi Qiān (魏谦); Goldman; Ken (ケン)		Japanese: Shōgo Yano
Hades (ハデス)		Japanese: Takanori Hoshino
Hǎo Měilì (郝美丽); Hollow; Merry (メリー Merī)		Japanese: Rika Kinugawa
Liú Jié (刘杰); Jay; Lewis (ルイス Ruisu)		Japanese: Hana Takeda
Liú Qí (刘琦); Josie; Lucia (ルチア Ruchia)		Japanese: Hana Takeda
Officer Wang (王警官 Wáng Jǐngguān); Officer Landsman; Wang (ワン Wan)		Japanese: Tanuki Sugino
Shen (榊); Leto; Sakaki (サカキ)		Japanese: Shunsuke Sakuya
Zhōng Yì (锺易); Litton; Kei (ケイ)		Japanese: Tatsuhisa Suzuki
Mr. Cai Lao (蔡老先生 Cài Lǎo Xiānshēng); Mr. Mills; Cai (サイ Sai)		Japanese: Yutaka Nakano
Mr. Lin (林老板 Lín Lǎobǎn); Mr. Noah; Lin (リン Rin)		Japanese: Hiroo Sasaki
Cháo Bàtiān (潮霸天); Punkilles; Kyōya (キョウヤ)		Japanese: Gakuto Kajiwara
Agent (经纪人 Jīngjìrén); Savin; Shin (シン)		Japanese: Hirofumi Nojima

== Anime adaptation ==
An anime television series adaptation was announced on July 8, 2019. The series is directed by Munehisa Sakai at studio MAPPA, with Kiyoko Yoshimura and Jinshichi Yamaguchi behind the scriptwriting and characters design respectively. Emoto Entertainment is producing the series. The main cast members reprised their roles for the anime. It aired from July 15 to September 30, 2020, on Tokyo MX and other channels. The opening theme song, "Nibiiro no Yoake" (Dark Gray Dawn), was performed by Yutaro Miura. The ending theme song, "Maioritekita Yuki" (Snow That Flies Down), was performed by Konomi Suzuki. Hu Xia's "Chen Hun" (Daybreak Dusk) and Ju Jingyi's "Mèng de Lû háng" (Dream's Voyage) both serve as the opening and ending theme respectively for the Chinese airing of the series.

=== Episodes ===
No.	Title	Directed by	Written by	Original release date
1	"The Beginning Bonds"; Transliteration: "Hajimari no kizuna" (Japanese: はじまりの絆)	Munehisa Sakai	Kiyoko Yoshimura	July 15, 2020
2	"When The Wind Blows"; Transliteration: "Kaze fuku toki ni" (Japanese: 風吹く時に)	Kōnosuke Uda	Kiyoko Yoshimura	July 22, 2020
3	"A Taste of Reminiscence"; Transliteration: "Tsuioku no aji" (Japanese: 追憶の味)	Yasutomo Okamoto	Shigeru Murakoshi	July 29, 2020
4	"The Key in the Darkness"; Transliteration: "Yami no naka no kagi" (Japanese: 闇の中の鍵)	Yasunori Gotō	Akira Kindaichi	August 5, 2020
5	"An Amber Wind"; Transliteration: "Kohakushoku no kaze" (Japanese: 琥珀色の風)	Takafumi Ishida	Kiyoko Yoshimura	August 12, 2020
6	"Beyond That Dream"; Transliteration: "Sono yume no mukō" (Japanese: その夢の向こう)	Kazue Ōtsuki	Ayumu Hisao	August 19, 2020
7	"Connected Memories"; Transliteration: "Tsunagatta kioku" (Japanese: 繋がった記憶)	Kōnosuke Uda	Shigeru Murakoshi	August 26, 2020
8	"Room 404"; Transliteration: "404-Gōshitsu" (Japanese: 404号室)	Kōki Aoshima	Kiyoko Yoshimura	September 2, 2020
9	"Monochrome"; Transliteration: "Monokurōmu" (Japanese: モノクローム)	Yasutomo Okamoto	Ayumu Hisao	September 9, 2020
10	"Dawn of Farewell"; Transliteration: "Wakarenoyoake" (Japanese: 別れの夜明け)	Takafumi Ishida	Akira Kindaichi	September 16, 2020
11	"At the Edge of the Coming Time"; Transliteration: "Meguru toki no hate ni" (Japanese: めぐる時の果てに)	Kazue Ōtsuki	Kiyoko Yoshimura	September 23, 2020
12	"Bonds"; Transliteration: "Kizuna" (Japanese: 絆)	Takahiro Kaneko	Kiyoko Yoshimura	September 30, 2020

== Controversies ==
On June 4, 2021, it was announced that Papergames had cut ties with voice actor Jonah Scott after he tweeted "Taiwan is a country". Scott later deleted the tweet. In response, voice actors Sean Chiplock and Joe Zieja stepped down from the game. On June 7, 2021, the game's social media accounts announced that the characters voiced by Scott, Chiplock, and Zieja were going to appear in the upcoming English chapters without voices; confirming all three had their voice acting removed from the game.
