= Munehisa Sakai =

Japanese anime director (born 1971)

- 境 宗久
- Born: September 1, 1971 (age 54); Nagasaki Prefecture, Japan
- Occupation: Anime director
- Years active: 1992–present
- Employers: Toei Animation (1992–2017); MAPPA (2017–2022); Studio Kai (2022–present)
- Known for: Suite PreCure; Sailor Moon Crystal; Zombie Land Saga; Mr Love: Queen's Choice

Munehisa Sakai (Japanese: 境 宗久, Hepburn: Sakai Munehisa; born September 1, 1971) is a Japanese anime director. He joined Toei Animation in 1992, where he directed part of One Piece, Suite PreCure, and Sailor Moon Crystal. After leaving Toei Animation and joining MAPPA in 2017, he has directed Zombie Land Saga, Mr Love: Queen's Choice, and Dance Dance Danseur. Sakai later joined Studio Kai in 2022.

== Biography ==
While in an animator school, one of the teachers introduced Sakai to Toei Animation, which he joined in 1992. From 2006 to 2008, Sakai directed One Piece; Sakai also directed One Piece Film: Strong World in 2009. One Piece Film: Strong World won the award for excellence in animation of at the year and was nominated for animation of the year at the 34th Japan Academy Film Prize. In 2011, Sakai directed Suite PreCure. In 2014, he directed Sailor Moon Crystal.

In 2017, Sakai left Toei Animation and joined MAPPA. In 2018, Sakai directed Zombie Land Saga. The series won the animation of the year award in the television category at the Tokyo Anime Awards Festival in 2019. It was also nominated for anime of the year at the 2019 Crunchyroll Anime Awards. In 2020, he directed Mr Love: Queen's Choice. In 2022, Sakai will direct the anime adaptation of Dance Dance Danseur.

In 2022, Sakai left MAPPA, and joined Studio Kai. Later, he directed and made the storyboard for third episode of 7th Time Loop which aired on January 21, 2024.

== Works ==
=== TV series ===
- GeGeGe no Kitarō (1996–1998) (episode director)
- Dr. Slump (1997–1999) (episode director)
- Himitsu no Akko-chan (1998–1999) (episode director)
- One Piece (2006–2008) (director)
- Suite PreCure (2011–2012) (director)
- Days (2016) (deputy director)
- Kakegurui (2017) (opening director)
- Zombie Land Saga (2018–2021) (director)
- Mr Love: Queen's Choice (2020) (director)
- Dance Dance Danseur (2022) (director)
- 7th Time Loop (2024) (episode director and storyboard; episode 3)
- Snowball Earth (2026) (director)

=== Films ===
- One Piece Film: Strong World (2009) (director)

=== Web series ===
- Sailor Moon Crystal (2014–2015) (director)
