= Frogs in culture =

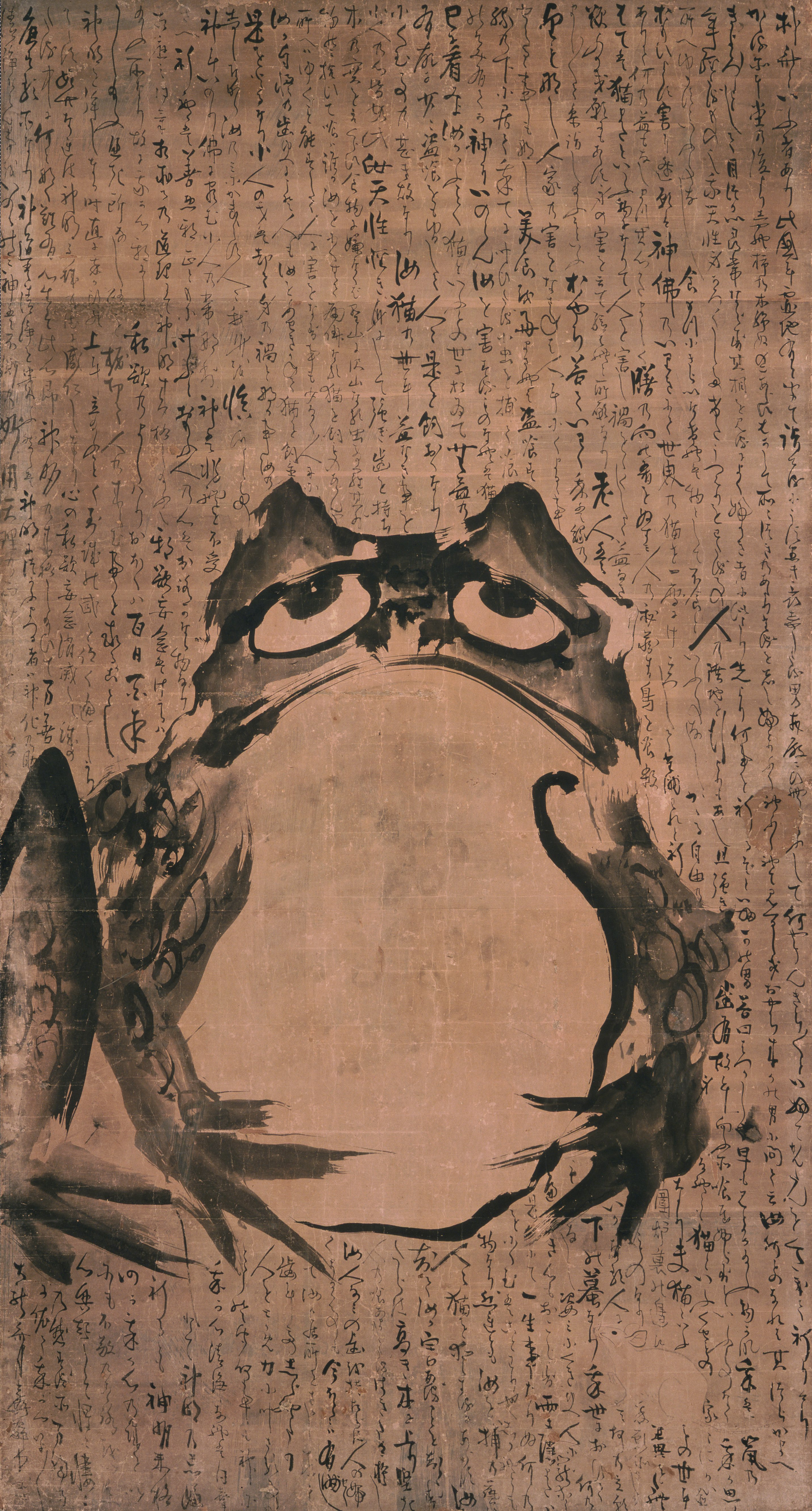
Frog and Mouse by Getsuju, a Japanese artist of the Edo period

Frogs play a variety of roles in culture, appearing in folklore and fairy tales such as the Brothers Grimm story of The Frog Prince. In ancient Egypt and Mesopotamia, frogs symbolized fertility, while in classical antiquity, the Greeks and Romans associated frogs with fertility, harmony, and licentiousness.

Frogs are the subjects of fables attributed to Aesop, of proverbs in various cultures, and of art. Frog characters such as Kermit the Frog and Pepe the Frog feature in popular culture. They are eaten in some parts of the world including France. In Australia, a fondant dessert is known as frog cake.

== History ==
Folklorist Andrew Lang listed myths about a frog or toad that swallows or blocks the flow of waters occurring in many world mythologies.

On the other hand, researcher Anna Engelking drew attention to the fact that studies on Indo-European mythology and its language see "a link between frogs and the underworld, and – by extension – sickness and death".

=== Ancient Mesopotamia ===
In the Sumerian epic poem of Inanna and Enki, the goddess Inanna tricks Enki, the god of water, into giving her all of the sacred mes, prompting Enki to send various watery creatures to retrieve them. The first of these is a frog, whom Enki grasps "by its right hand." Frogs also appear as filling motifs on cylinder seals of the Kassite Period.

=== Ancient Egypt ===
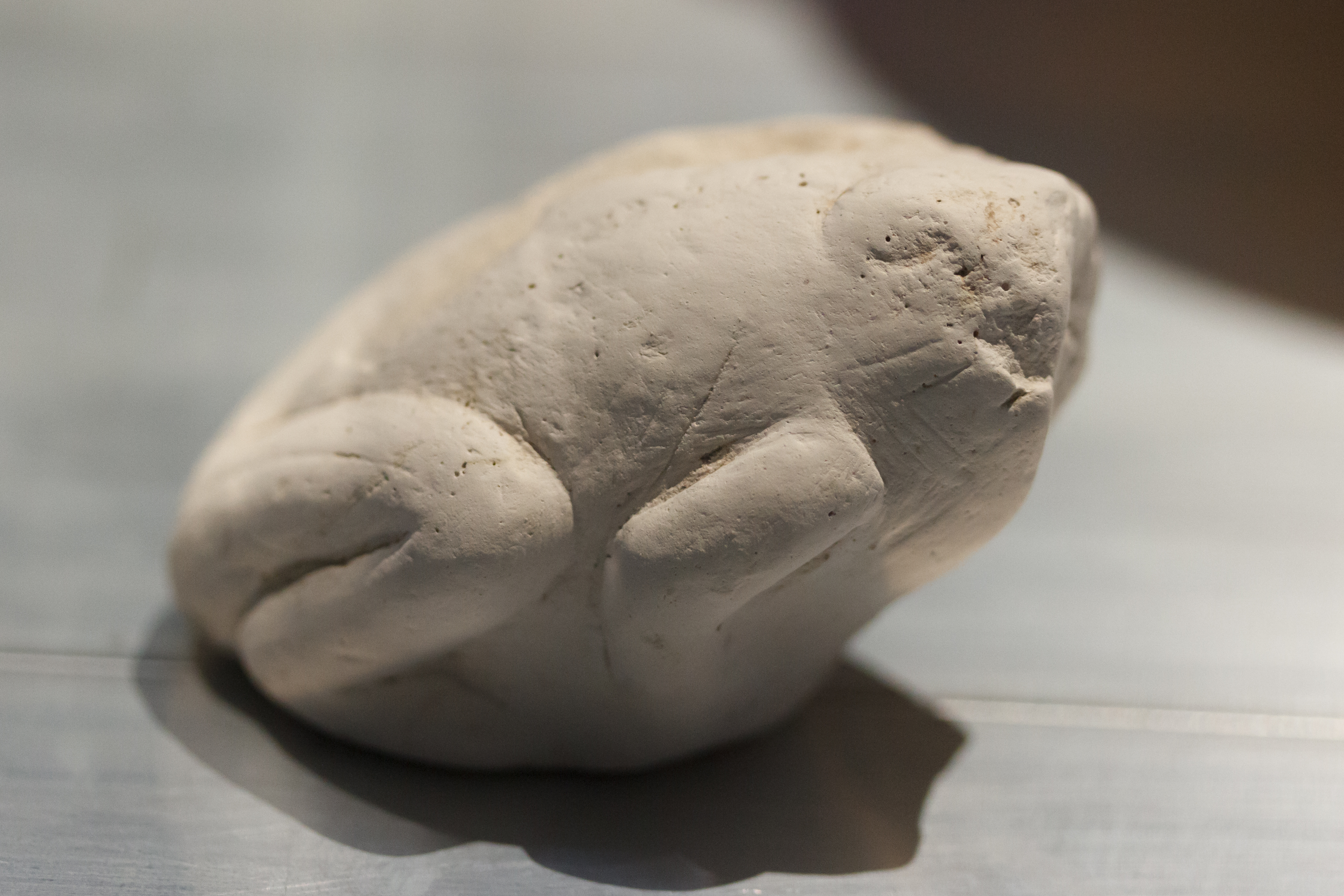
A limestone carving of a frog was found at Tell es-Sakan, an Egyptian settlement in Palestine. The frog dates to the last third of the 4th millennium BCE.

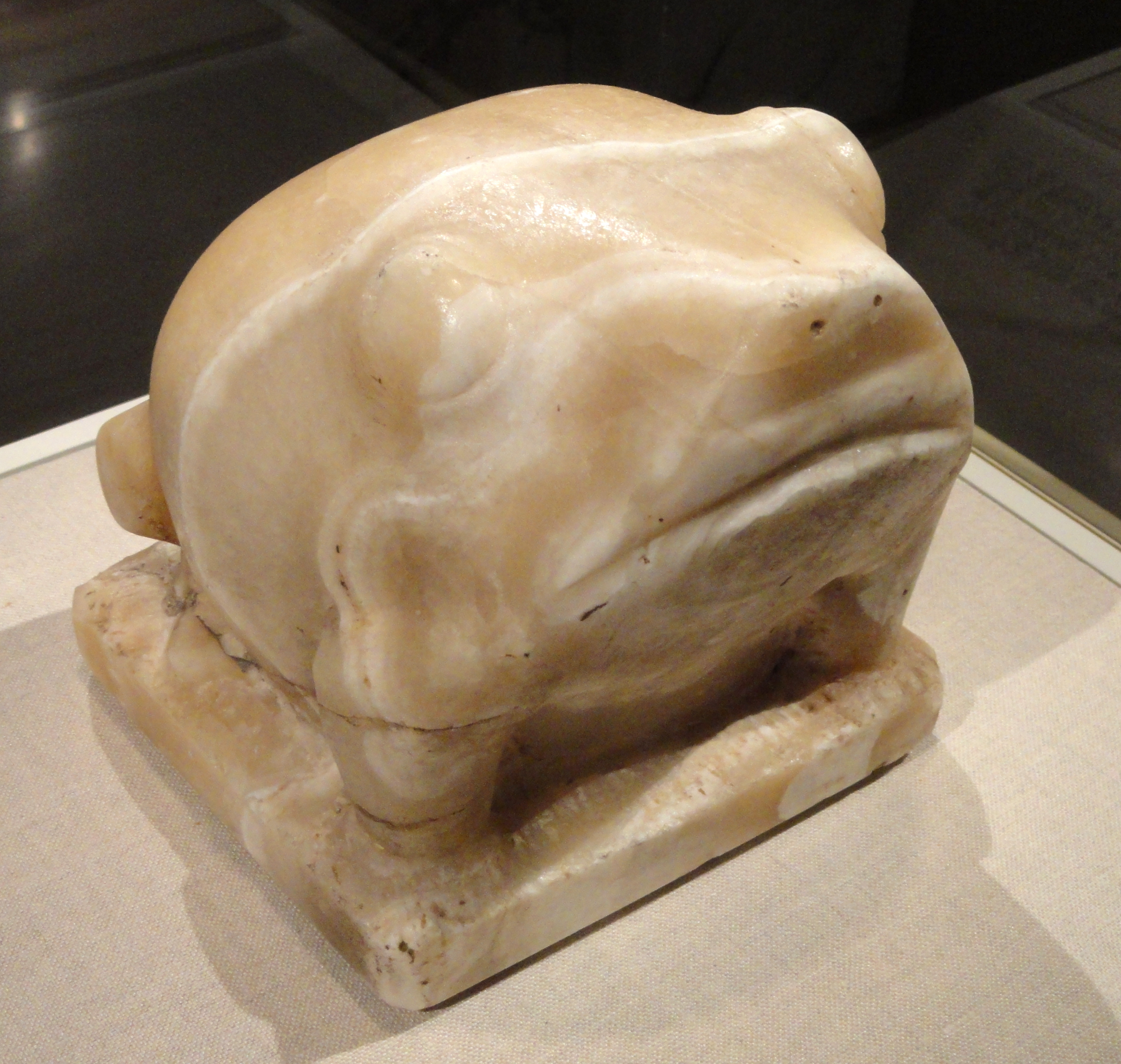
Early Dynastic (c. 3000 BC) frog statuette)

To the Egyptians, the frog was a symbol of life and fertility, since millions of them were born after the annual flooding of the Nile, which brought fertility to the otherwise barren lands. Consequently, in Egyptian mythology, there began to be a frog-goddess, who represented fertility, named Heqet. Heqet was usually depicted as a frog, or a woman with a frog's head, or more rarely as a frog on the end of a phallus to explicitly indicate her association with fertility. A lesser known Egyptian god, Kek, was also sometimes shown in the form of a frog.

Texts of the Late Period describe the Ogdoad of Hermepolis, a group of eight "primeval" gods, as having the heads of frogs (male) and serpents (female), and they are often depicted in this way in reliefs of the Greco-Roman period. The god Nu in particular is sometimes depicted either with the head of a frog surmounted by a beetle.

Hapi was a deification of the annual flood of the Nile River, in Egyptian mythology, which deposited rich silt on the banks, allowing the Egyptians to grow crops. In Lower Egypt, he was adorned with papyrus plants, and attended by frogs, present in the region, and symbols of it.

=== Classical antiquity ===
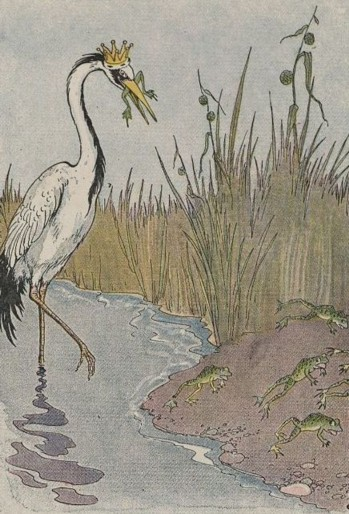
A frog being eaten by King Stork, an illustration by Milo Winter in a 1919 Aesop anthology

The Greeks and Romans associated frogs with fertility and harmony, and with licentiousness in association with Aphrodite. The combat between the Frogs and the Mice (Batrachomyomachia) was a mock epic, commonly attributed to Homer, though in fact a parody of his Iliad. The Frogs Who Desired a King is a fable, attributed to Aesop. The Frogs prayed to Zeus asking for a King. Zeus set up a log to be their monarch. The Frogs protested they wanted a fierce and terrible king, not a mere figurehead. So Zeus sent them a Stork to be their king. The new king hunted and devoured his subjects. Aesop wrote a fable about a frog trying to inflate itself to the size of an ox. Phaedrus (and later Jean de La Fontaine) wrote versions of this fable. The Frogs is a comic play by Aristophanes, in which the choir of frogs sings the famous onomatopoeic line: "Brekekekex koax koax."

In the Bible, the Second Plague of Egypt described in the Book of Exodus 8:6 is of frogs. In the New Testament, frogs are associated with unclean spirits in Revelation 16:13.

=== Medieval and Early Modern ===
Medieval Christian tradition based on the Physiologus distinguished land frogs from water frogs representing righteous and sinful congregationists, respectively. In folk religion and occultism, the frog also became associated with witchcraft or as an ingredient for love potions.

The Japanese poet Matsuo Bashō wrote one of his most famous haiku about a frog jumping into an old pond.

== In folk and fairy tales ==
The frog is also a character in many fairy tales, be it tales from oral tradition or literary reworkings by later writers.

The frog or toad appears as a potential suitor to a female human in variants of the Aarne–Thompson–Uther type ATU 440, "The Frog King". The most famous is the story of The Frog Prince. It also appears as a female bride in tales of type ATU 402, "The Animal Bride", such as Puddocky (German fairy tale), The Frog Princess (Russian fairy tale) and The Three Feathers (German fairy tale).

It also acts as a helper of the heroes and heroines, such as in the beginning of the story of the Sleeping Beauty, and in French literary fairy tales The Benevolent Frog (by MMe. d'Aulnoy) and The Little Green Frog.

In Hans Christian Andersen's lengthy fairy tale "The Marsh King's Daughter," a beautiful young woman is transformed, night after night, into a large, mournful frog. With the first rays of dawn, she changes back to human form.

The toad appears as a transformation for the hero Jiraiya in the Japanese story The Tale of the Gallant Jiraiya.

The frog appears in the form of a beautiful maiden, named Bheki, in a tale from Sanskrit legend. The amphibian, in this story, symbolizes the sun.

== In modern culture ==
=== Proverbs and popular traditions ===
The "frog in a well" saying about having a narrow vision of life is found in Sanskrit ("Kupa Manduka", कुपमन्डुक), in Bengali, কুপমন্ডুক), in Vietnamese "Ếch ngồi đáy giếng coi trời bằng vung" ("Sitting at the bottom of wells, frogs think that the sky is as wide as a lid"), and in Malay "Bagai katak dibawah tempurung" ("Like a frog under a coconut shell").. The Chinese versions are "坐井觀天" ("sitting in the well, looking to the sky") and "井底之蛙" ("a frog in a well") from the Taoist classic Zhuangzi that has a frog living in an abandoned well, who talks about things big and small with the turtle of the Eastern Sea.

Other frog proverbs include the American "You can't tell by looking at a frog how high he will jump" and the Iranian "When the snake gets old, the frog gets him by the balls."

In Chinese traditional culture, frogs represent the lunar yin, and the Frog spirit Ch'ing-Wa Sheng is associated with healing and good fortune in business, although a frog in a well is symbolic of a person lacking in understanding and vision.

The supposed behavior of frogs illustrating nonaction is told in the often-repeated story of the boiled frog: put a frog in boiling water and it will jump out, but put it in cold water and slowly heat it, and it will not notice the danger and will be boiled alive. The story was based on nineteenth century experiments in which frogs were shown to stay in heating water as long as it was heated very slowly. The validity of the experiments is however disputed. Professor Douglas Melton, Harvard University Biology Department, says: "If you put a frog in boiling water, it won't jump out. It will die. If you put it in cold water, it will jump before it gets hot—they don't sit still for you."

The short poem "What a queer bird", which appeared in magazines in the 1920s, is about the qualities of a frog from a bird's perspective.

In Finland, miniature wooden coffins containing frogs have been discovered under the floors of some churches, and in other places such as in a field, under a cowshed, in rapids, or in a hearth. They are thought to have been part of a practice of magic, or to protect against magic.

According to researcher Anna Engelking, there is a certain naming taboo in Polish folk belief regarding calling a child a frog, since it may stunt the child's growth. Hence, there is a verbal avoidance of mentioning the frog by its name, instead using a euphemism that denotes some trait (i.e, 'the one that jumps').

=== In art ===
The Moche people of ancient Peru worshipped animals and often depicted frogs in their art. Painters of the Dutch Golden Age sometimes included frogs in their compositions; for example, Ambrosius Bosschaert II painted a vanitas still life Dead Frog with Flies c. 1630; in 2012, the artists Rob and Nick Carter created a silent digital version, lasting three hours, in which the "still" image "slowly, imperceptibly" changes with the movement of the sun, and occasionally an insect such as a dragonfly enters the scene.

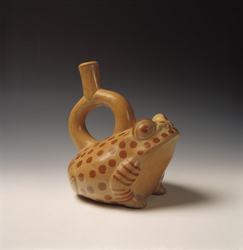
Moche frog, 200 AD

Wrestling frogs from Chōjū-jinbutsu-giga, cartoon, Japan, 12th century

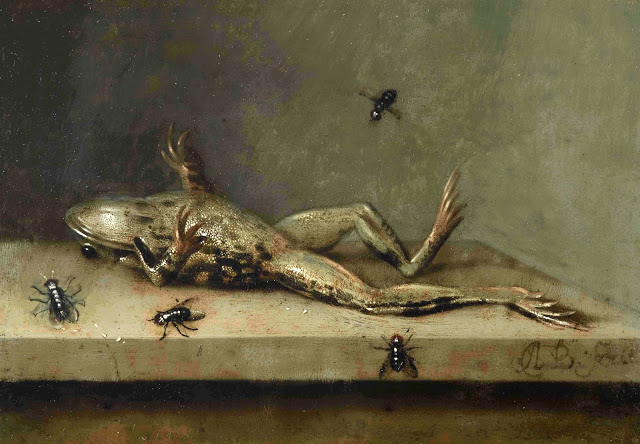
Dead Frog with Flies by Ambrosius Bosschaert II, c. 1630

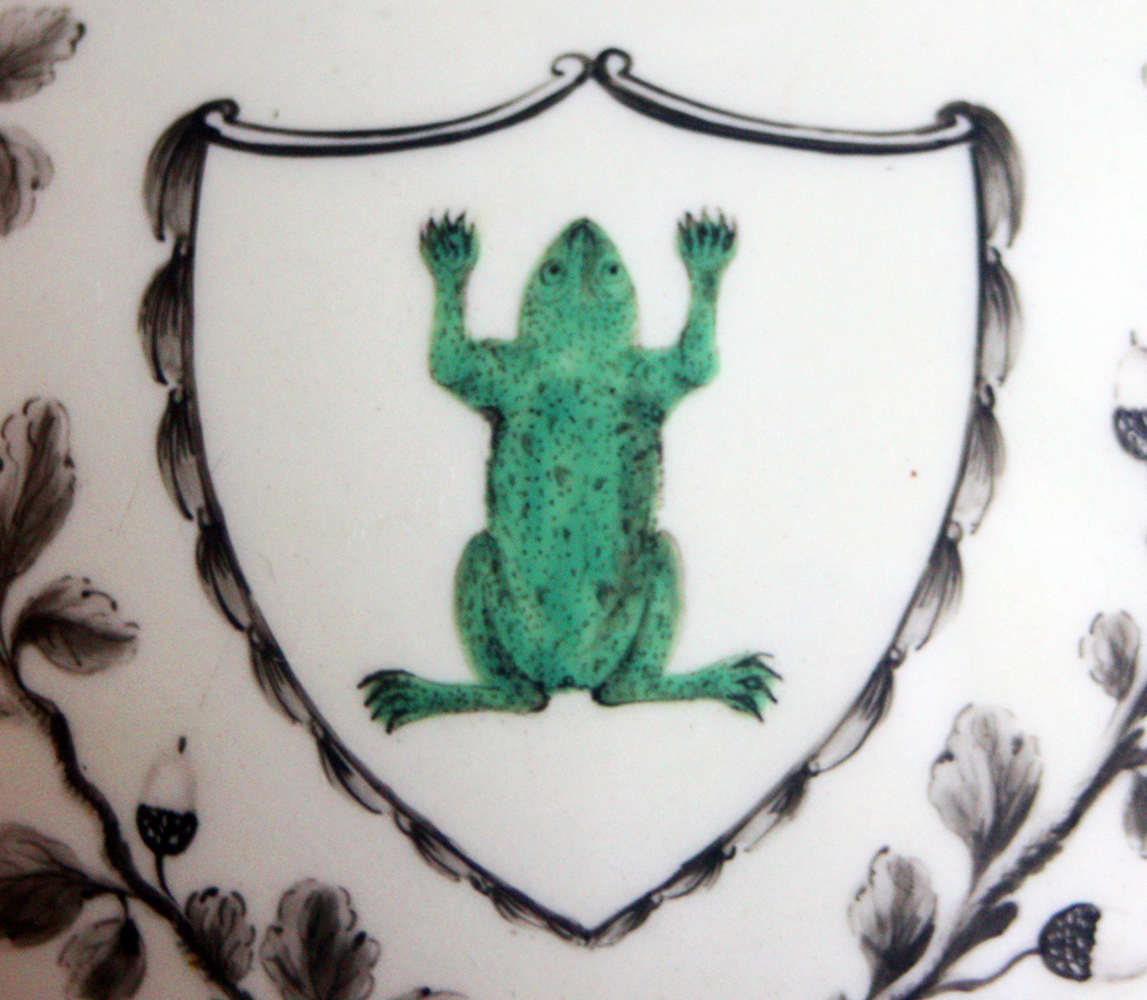
Detail of Josiah Wedgwood's Frog Service, 1773–4, made for Catherine the Great of Russia

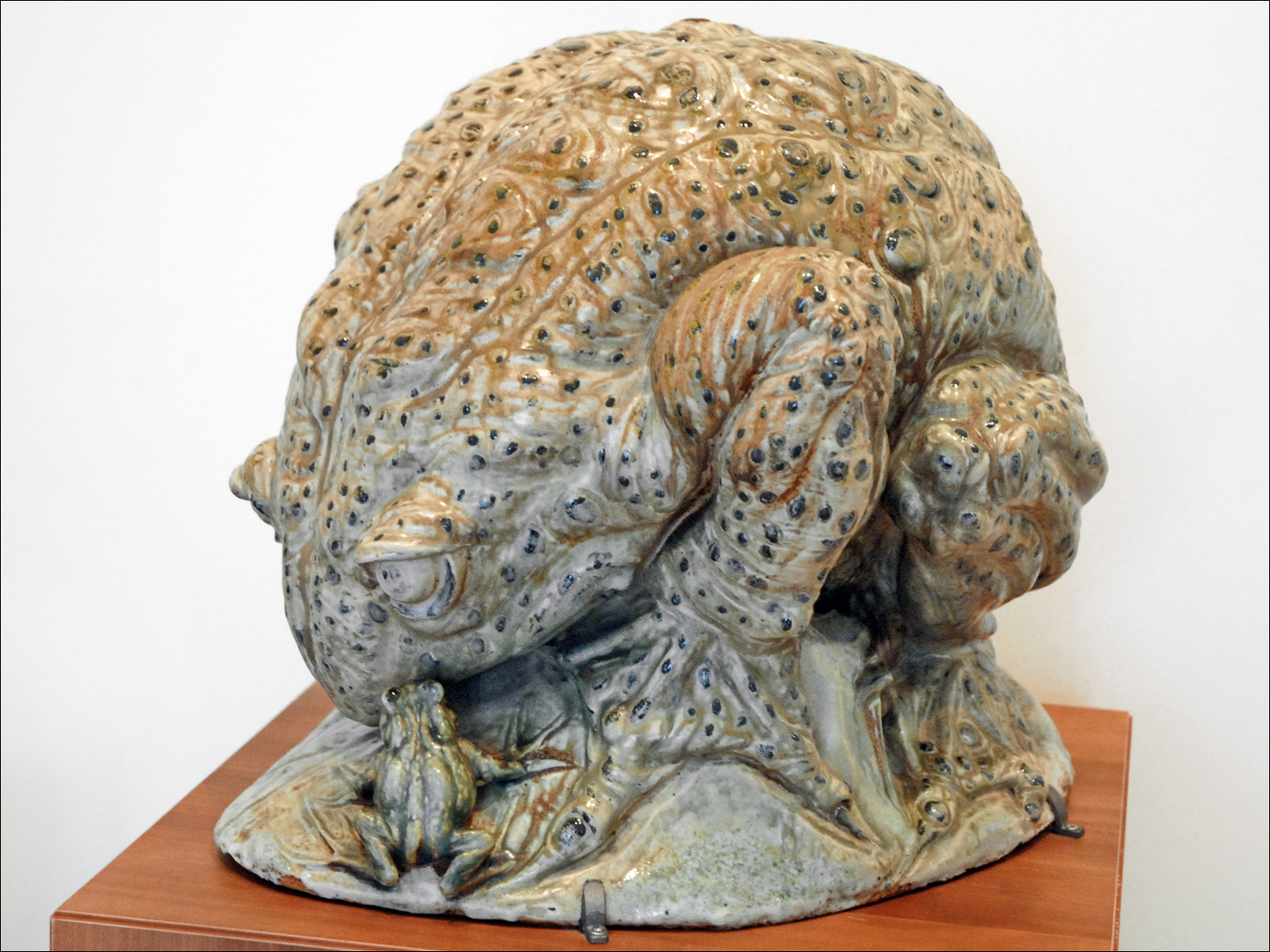
Crapaud et Grenouille ("Frog and Toad") by Jean Carriès, between 1889 and 1894

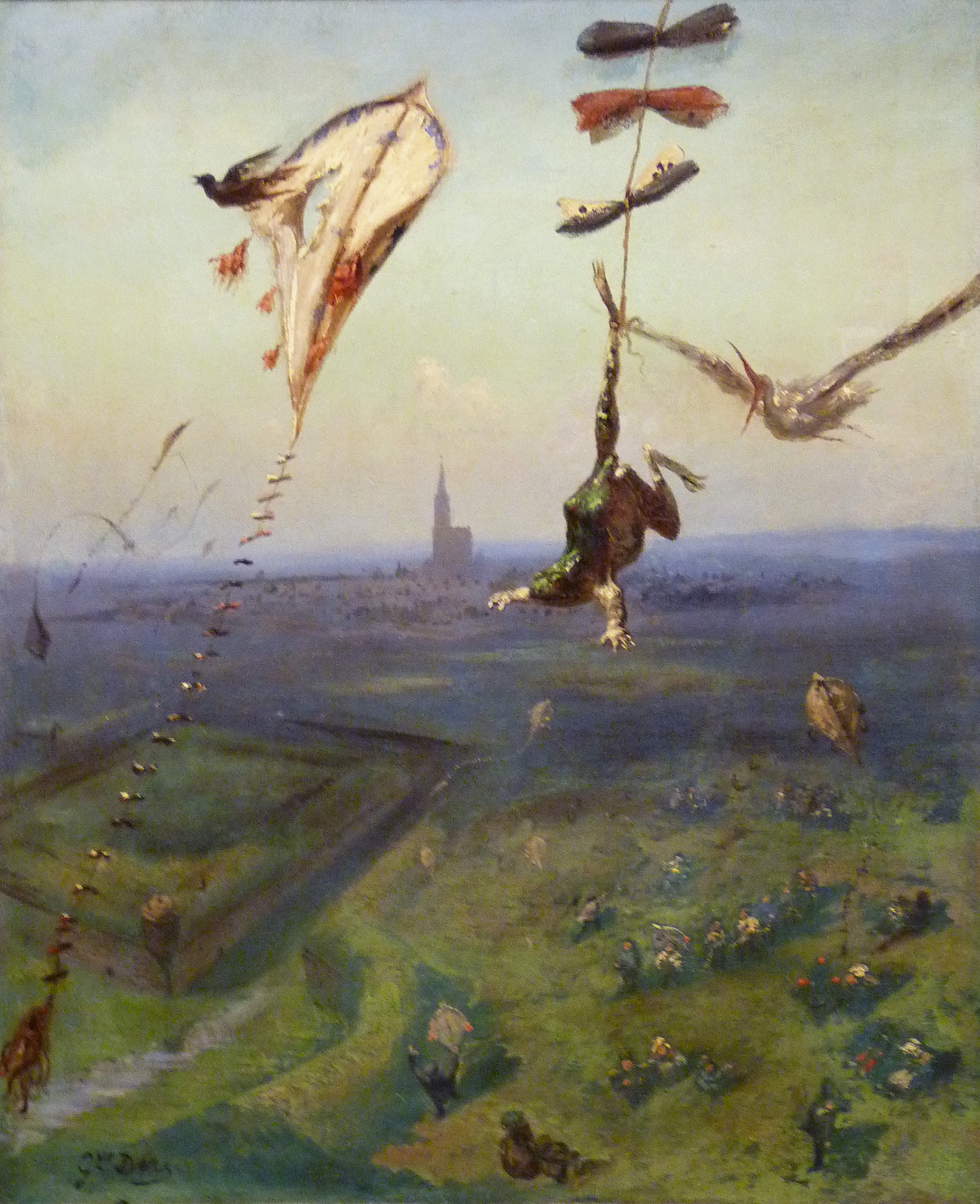
Entre ciel et terre, by Gustave Doré, 1862

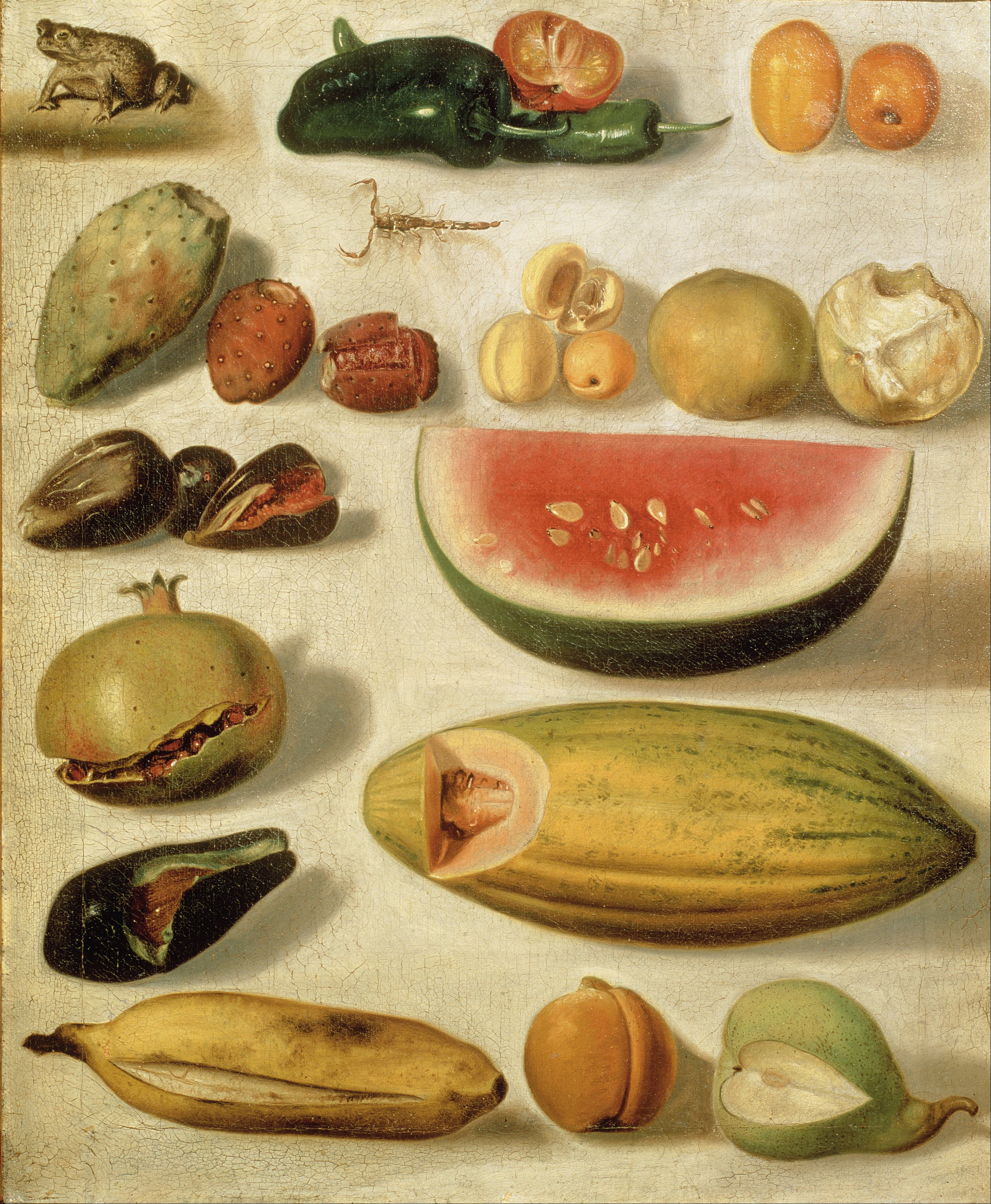
Hermenegildo Bustos, Still life with fruit, 1874

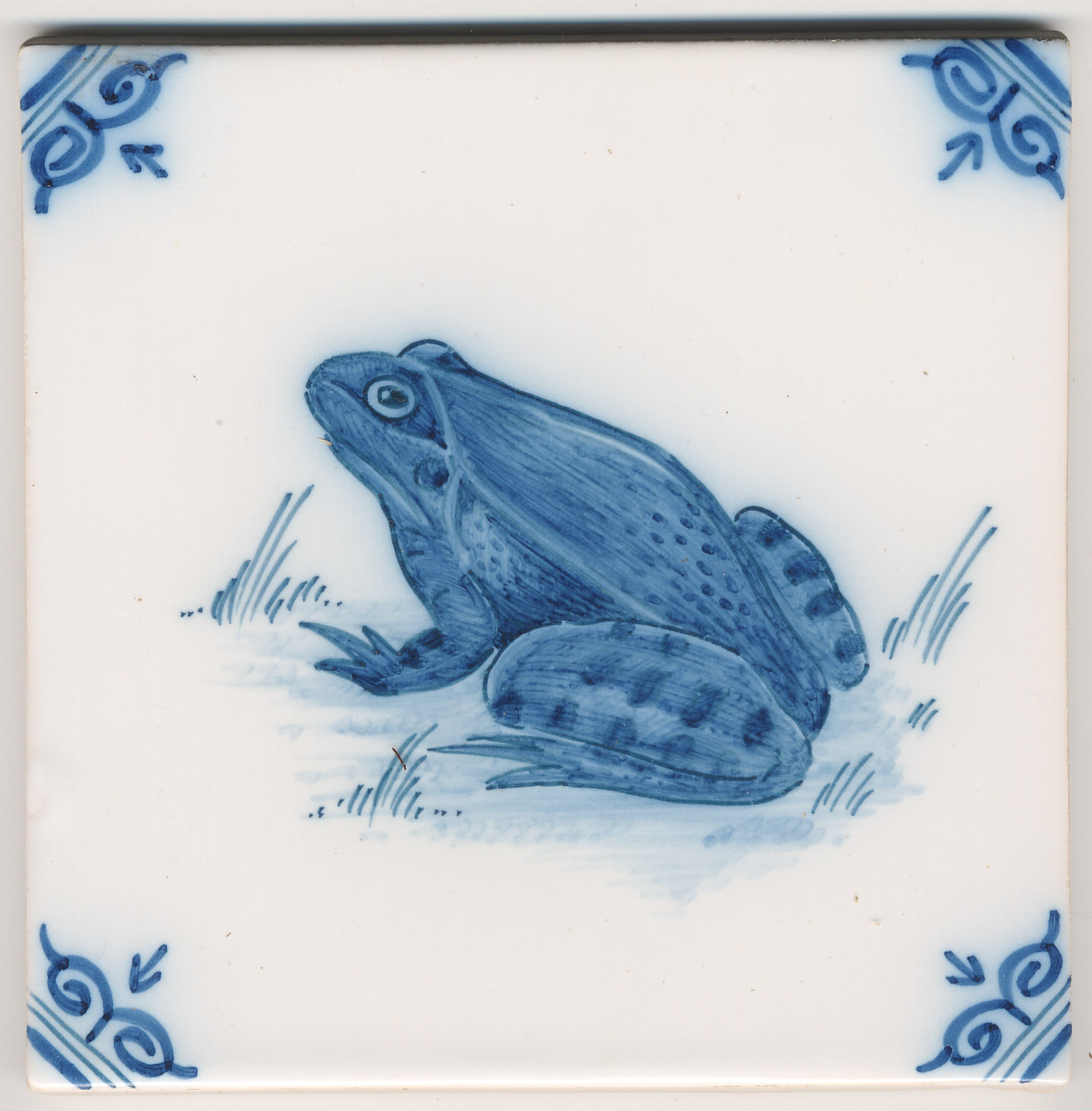
Old Dutch tile from Friesland

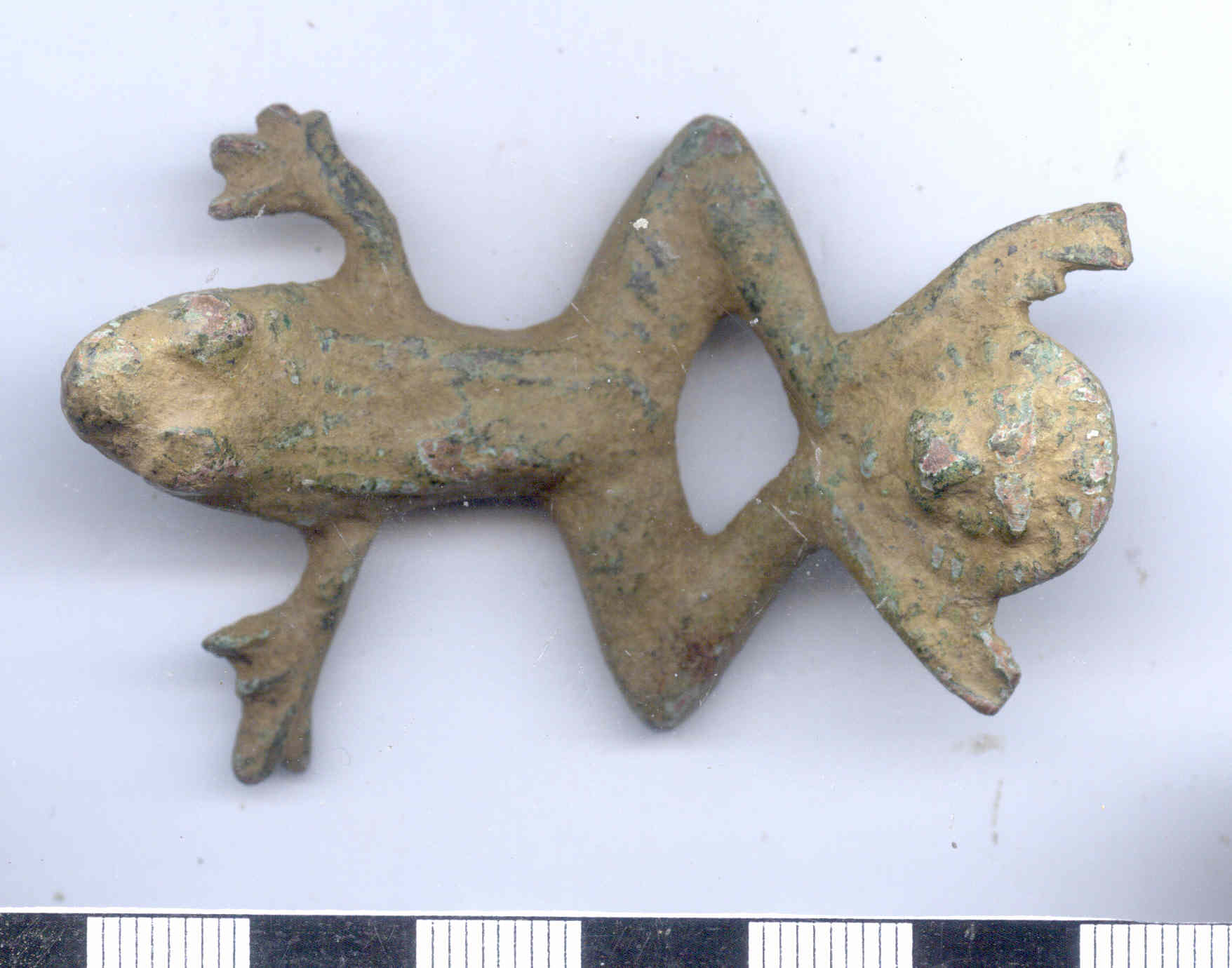
Roman lamp mount shaped like a frog.

Frog pictured in the coat of arms of Baloži

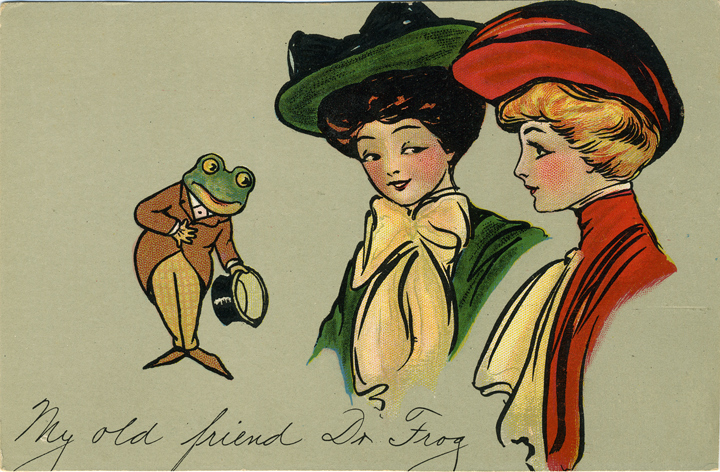
"My Old Friend Dr. Frog". Promotional postcard for "Frog In Your Throat" Company throat medicine

=== Contemporary pop culture ===
The theme of transformation features prominently in popular culture, from The Frog Prince to fantasy settings such as the Final Fantasy and Chrono Trigger video games with magic spells that turn people into frogs.

Michigan J. Frog featured in a Warner Brothers cartoon. Kermit the Frog is the straight man character in Sesame Street and The Muppet Show.

Several Pokémon species are based on frogs and toads, such as the Poliwrath, Politoed, Seismitoad, Toxicroak, and Greninja evolutionary families.

Tsuyu Asui, also known as Froppy, is a superhero with frog-related powers in the manga and anime series My Hero Academia.

Pepe the Frog is a frog character from a webcomic which became a popular Internet meme, and was eventually used as a symbol of the alt-right movement.

Suwako Moriya is a goddess whose looks are inspired by frogs. She is from the bullet hell video game Touhou Fuujinroku: Mountain of Faith.

In the Disney animated series Amphibia, anthropomorphic frogs are one of the fictional races from an alternate universe where frogs and other amphibians play the role of humans.

In the webcomic Homestuck, universes exist in the form of enormous Genesis Frogs. In the game Undertale, which took inspiration from it, frogs exist as the common monster enemy Froggits.

In the Netflix original series Captain Laserhawk: A Blood Dragon Remix, one of the main characters is an anthropomorphic frog, named Bullfrog.

=== Cuisine and confectionery ===
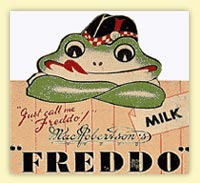
Freddo Frog advertisement, 1930

Frogs are eaten, notably in France. One dish is known as cuisses de grenouille, frogs' legs, and although it is not especially common, it is taken as indicative of French cuisine. From this, "frog" has also developed into a common derogatory term for French people in English.

Freddo Frog is a popular Australian chocolate, while frog cake is a Heritage Listed South Australian fondant dessert. Crunchy Frog is a fictitious confectionery from a Monty Python skit of the same name. Chocolate Frogs are a popular sweet in the Harry Potter universe.

=== Pepe the Frog in 4chan culture ===
Pepe the Frog (/ˈpɛpeɪ/ PEP-ay) is a comic character and Internet meme created by cartoonist Matt Furie. Designed as a green anthropomorphic frog with a humanoid body usually wearing a blue t-shirt, Pepe originated in Furie's 2005 webcomic Boy's Club. The character became an Internet meme when his popularity steadily grew across websites such as Myspace, Gaia Online, and 4chan from 2008 onwards; by 2015, he had become one of the most popular memes on 4chan and Tumblr.

Different types of Pepe memes include "Sad Frog", "Smug Frog", "Angry Pepe", "Feels Frog", and "You will never..." Frog; the most popular sentences associated to him are "Feels Good Man" (a quote from his original Boy's Club appearance, which became the character's catchphrase) and its opposite, "Feels Bad Man", meant to respectively express joy and sadness. Since 2014, "Rare Pepes" have been posted on the "meme market" as if they were trading cards.

Although originally an apolitical character in Furie's works and its original internet popularity, Pepe was appropriated from 2015 onward as a symbol of the alt-right white nationalist movement. The Anti-Defamation League (ADL) included Pepe in its hate symbol database in 2016, but said most instances of Pepe were not used in a hate-related context. Since then, Furie has expressed his dismay at Pepe being used as a hate symbol and has sued organizations for doing so; the history of Pepe and Furie's attempt to dissociate the character from the alt-right were covered in the 2020 documentary film Feels Good Man. In 2019, Pepe was used by protesters in the 2019–2020 Hong Kong protests; conversely to its western political use, Pepe the Frog's symbolism in Hong Kong is not perceived as being connected with alt-right ideology, and was welcomed by Furie.

== See also ==
- Ethnoherpetology
- List of fictional frogs
- Salamanders in folklore and legend
