= One Piece season 15 =

Season of television series

One Piece
- Season 15; Fish-Man Island
- Cover art for the first home media volume of the season as released by Avex
- No. of episodes: 62

Release
- Original network: Fuji Television
- Original release: October 2, 2011 – December 23, 2012

Season chronology
- ← Previous; Season 14 Next → Season 16

The fifteenth season of the One Piece anime television series was produced by Toei Animation, and directed by Hiroaki Miyamoto. The season was broadcast in Japan on Fuji Television on October 2, 2011 to December 23, 2012. Like the rest of the series, it follows the reunion of Monkey D. Luffy and his Straw Hat Pirates after two years later of completing their training sessions to rejoin their adventures. The first of fourteen DVD compilations was released on December 5, 2012, and the last one was released on December 3, 2013.

The main story arc, called "Fish-Man Island" (魚人島, Gyojin-tō), adapts material from the 61st to the end of the 66th volumes of the manga by Eiichiro Oda. Two years have passed since the summit war at Marineford and Ace and Whitebeard's deaths, Luffy and the Straw Hats reunite at Sabaody after completing their training sessions. From there, they head off to Fish-Man Island. However, they end up facing Hordy Jones (Note: Hody Jones (ホーディ・ジョーンズ) is spelled as Hordy Jones in the Funimation English adaptation) who plots to use a coup d'état to take control of Fish-Man Island. The final four episodes contain an anime original story arc, called "Z's Ambition" (Z(ゼット)の野望編, Zetto no Yabō-hen), which serves as a prologue to the concurrently released One Piece Film: Z.

Only a single piece of theme music is used for this season. The opening theme, titled "We Go!" (ウィーゴー!), is performed by Hiroshi Kitadani.

In October 2024, it was announced that the anime series would go on hiatus until April 2025 for the "Egghead" story arc, and that a remastered and re-edited version of the "Fish-Man Island" story arc would air in the show's timeslot during the break.

== Episodes ==
No. overall	No. in season	Title	Directed by	Written by	Original release date	English air date
Return to Sabaody
517	1	"The Beginning of the New Chapter! The Straw Hats Reunited!"; Transliteration: "Shinshō Kaimaku - Saishūketsu! Mugiwara no Ichimi" (Japanese: 新章開幕 再集結！麦わらの一味)	Hiroaki Miyamoto	Hirohiko Kamisaka	October 2, 2011	January 23, 2022
Two years have passed since the Summit War of Marineford and Ace and Whitebeard's deaths, and the Straw Hat Pirates have since trained for their return. Luffy departs Ruskaina to the Sabaody Archipelago to reunite with his crew and Zoro visits Rayleigh and Shakky in her bar. At a local tavern, Nami learns the Marines have switched their headquarters with their G1 Branch to be next to the Four Emperors. At the Sabao Dome, Brook holds his farewell concert as the Soul King and Sanji and the Okamas go their separate ways. Nami refuses to join a group of pirates who say they are the Straw Hats, but as soon as she is threatened, Usopp shoots down the fake pirates. Nami and Usopp finally reunite and Usopp reveals his new Pop Green weapon. Nami and Usopp flee, but not before she launches Weather Balls at the pirates. As the Marines are summoned to the archipelago to capture Luffy, Robin discovers Brook's concert pamphlet and a recruitment notice with two World Government agents in hot pursuit, Franky waits with the coated Thousand Sunny, and Chopper is excited at the Straw Hats' reunion. Just as the fake Straw Hats try to find Nami and Usopp, the real Luffy bumps into them.
518	2	"An Explosive Situation! Luffy vs. Fake Luffy!"; Transliteration: "Isshoku Sokuhatsu! Rufi tai Nise Rufi" (Japanese: 一触即発！ルフィVS(たい)ニセルフィ)	Naoyuki Itō	Yoshiyuki Suga	October 9, 2011	January 23, 2022
Using a fake disguise provided by Hancock, Luffy and the Kuja tribe go their separate ways and he confronts the Fake Straw Hats. At Shakky's bar, Sanji thanks Duval for his efforts in protecting the Thousand Sunny. Rayleigh tells the cook that he was the seventh to come here. However, Luffy and Robin have not shown up yet. Chopper discovers another group of Fake Straw Hats and follows them, not realizing that they are the fake ones. While Robin continues to evade the government agents from capturing her, Luffy uses his Haki techniques to defeat Fake Luffy's group. Meanwhile, the government agents capture the Fake Robin. Sanji learns about what has happened to Zoro from a fisherman. While talking to the fisherman, Sanji finally discovers Zoro had destroyed the ship he was in.
519	3	"The Navy Has Set Out! The Straw Hats in Danger!"; Transliteration: "Kaigun Shutsudō - Nerawareta Mugiwara no Ichimi" (Japanese: 海軍出動 狙われた麦わらの一味)	Yutaka Nakashima	Tomohiro Nakayama	October 16, 2011	January 30, 2022
Robin finally makes it to the Thousand Sunny and reunites with Franky. The archaeologist reveals to Franky that she is the eighth person who saw Rayleigh, as Luffy has yet to appear. Meanwhile, Chopper learns that he is the real one while discussing with the Fake Straw Hats and it is revealed that the Fake Straw Hats have recruited more than 100 pirates to their crew. At a Marine base, Sentomaru and the Pacifistas depart for the Sabaody Archipelago in response to Luffy's return. At a fashion shop, Nami buys clothes for 90% discounts and Sanji and Zoro walk around town. Chopper chases after the Fake Robin, but Nami and Usopp find him. Chopper finally realizes that the real Nami has arrived and the three depart for the Thousand Sunny. The Marines encounter a group of pirates gathered for Fake Luffy's arrival, including the brothers Caribou and Coribou.
520	4	"Big Guns Assembled! The Danger of the Fake Straw Hats!"; Transliteration: "Ōmono Shūketsu - Nise Mugiwara Ichimi no Kyōi" (Japanese: 大物集結 ニセ麦わら一味の脅威)	Gō Koga	Jin Tanaka	October 23, 2011	January 30, 2022
At the Sabao Dome, Brook finishes his song. Meanwhile, Caribou frightens a Marine, digging a live grave with Coribou, and Fake Luffy rallies the pirates. However, the real Luffy gets caught up in the situation. Meanwhile, Brook is confronted by the Marines and his managers. At the Thousand Sunny, Usopp and Chopper reunite with Franky. The shipwright then reveals that not only did he create a new version of himself, but he can change his hairstyle by pushing his nose, while Nami boards the ship. Upon her arrival, Rayleigh and Shakky inform the others about what has happened. Meanwhile, Brook informs everyone that Luffy is alive and performs a new song before departing. Rayleigh instructs Nami about how to control the ship and Shakky reveals that she wiretapped the Transponder Snails. Rayleigh says that Luffy will be arriving soon; the Straw Hats and Shakky join him in awaiting Luffy's arrival.
521	5	"The Battle Is On! Show Them What You Got from Training!"; Transliteration: "Sentō Kaishi! Misero Shugyō no Seika!" (Japanese: 戦闘開始！見せろ修行の成果！)	Takashi Ōtsuka	Hirohiko Kamisaka	October 30, 2011	February 6, 2022
After Brook escapes from the Marines at the Sabao Dome with a Rosy Life Rider, a riot is going on in the dome. Meanwhile, Luffy is caught before the Fake Straw Hats. However, the Marines confront them just as Caribou kills the injured Marine. Caribou refuses to cooperate with Fake Luffy and the Fake Straw Hats battle the Marines. The Pacifistas appear to defeat the Fake Straw Hats, discover the real Luffy, and knock down Doughty. Sentomaru catches the Fake Straw Hats, and promptly defeats the Fake Luffy, exposing him as Demalo Black. Just as Luffy reveals himself as the real one and uses his new abilities to destroy PX-5 with a single blow, Sanji and Zoro reunite with Luffy and destroy PX-7 together. When Luffy, Zoro, and Sanji meet up with Rayleigh, Luffy proclaims that he will become King of the Pirates.
522	6	"Everyone Together! Luffy, Setting Out for the New World!"; Transliteration: "Zen'in Shūgō - Rufi Shin Sekai e no Funade" (Japanese: 全員集合 ルフィ新世界への船出)	Hiroyuki Satō	Jin Tanaka	November 6, 2011	February 6, 2022
After Luffy and Rayleigh go their separate ways, Rayleigh draws a line to prevent the Marines from coming any further to the Straw Hats. However, Perona appears and it is revealed that a battleship is headed for the Thousand Sunny. Meanwhile, Brook boards the Thousand Sunny. Using one of his birds, Chopper returns to the Thousand Sunny with Sanji, Luffy and Zoro on board, but as soon as they finally reunite, the Thousand Sunny is attacked. Hancock stops the Marines from harming the Straw Hats and Sanji is dismayed at Luffy for befriending the Snake Princess. Meanwhile, Heracles uses his beetles to crush a Marine squadron, Haredas uses the weather technology to distract another squadron. Franky goes underwater and uses the airbag to create a bubble to prepare the ship for the deep oceans. Chopper's bird attacks another battleship, Sanji destroys another ship by deflecting a cannonball and the Okamas defeat another Marine squadron. Luffy and the others finally leave the Sabaody Archipelago for Fishman Island.
Fish-Man Island
523	7	"A Surprising Fact! The Man Who Guarded the Sunny!"; Transliteration: "Kyōgaku no Shinjitsu - Sanī-gō o Mamotta Otoko" (Japanese: 驚愕の真実 サニー号を守った男)	Yoshihiro Ueda	Yoshiyuki Suga	November 13, 2011	February 13, 2022
At the Sabaody Archipelago, Caribou has his men bury the Fake Straw Hats and departs to find the real Straw Hats. Rayleigh remembers that Luffy's Straw Hat actually belonged to Roger when they first met decades earlier. Meanwhile, the Straw Hats explore the vast regions of the deep ocean. Nami reveals that if too many holes are created, the coating will burst and destroy the ship. Franky reveals that Hatchan was taken to Fishman Island, as he was seriously injured when the Marines tried to claim the Thousand Sunny. It is also revealed that Kuma informed Rayleigh that he sent them away to help the Straw Hats, as he is a revolutionary. Kuma was eventually reprogrammed to protect the Thousand Sunny until the Straw Hats' arrival at Sabaody. The Straw Hats soon realize that they are being followed by Caribou. Using Mohmoo, the sea cow that used to belong to Arlong, as a steed, Caribou and his men prepare to launch a preemptive strike.
524	8	"Deadly Combat Under the Sea! The Demon of the Ocean Strikes!"; Transliteration: "Kaichū no Shitō - Arawareta Ōunabara no Akuma" (Japanese: 海中の死闘 現れた大海原の悪魔)	Aya Komaki	Tomohiro Nakayama	November 20, 2011	February 13, 2022
After ramming his ship into the Thousand Sunny, Caribou orders his men to attack, but Mohmoo, frightened by Luffy's and Sanji's appearance, flees with Caribou's crew. The Straw Hats capture Caribou while introducing himself. Nami tells the others if a ship goes straight, it can be destroyed by a volcano or crash into a mountain and Usopp clarifies that the Grand Line's currents can be very dangerous. Nami has the others put on jackets due to the deep sea's extreme cold temperatures. It is also revealed that the sea levels can be referred to as the Deep Currents. Just as they discuss about the currents, the ship heads straight for the Downward Plume, a massive undersea waterfall. However, they notice a large Kraken crushing ships for years and it destroys Caribou's ship, seemingly killing his crew. When Luffy prepares to attack the Kraken, Caribou has Luffy, Zoro, and Sanji put on the Flutter Kick Coating suits, allowing them to exit the bubble. Chopper uses his Guard Point technique and Robin uses her Mil Fleur: Gigantesco Mano technique to prevent the ship from taking any damage while Luffy, Zoro, and Sanji prepare to attack.
525	9	"Lost in the Deep Sea! The Straw Hats Get Separated!"; Transliteration: "Shinkai de Sōnan - Hagureta Mugiwara no Ichimi" (Japanese: 深海で遭難 逸れた麦わらの一味)	Katsumi Tokoro	Tomohiro Nakayama	November 27, 2011	February 20, 2022
Sanji uses his Blue Walk technique to more underwater at the speed of a fishman before burning alone of the Kraken's tentacles with a Diable Jambe while Zoro cuts off another. Luffy then demonstrate his mastery over Third Gear, place most of the air in his wrist while using the Armament Haki technique, Hardening to turn his arm black. Luffy then uses the Gum-Gum Elephant Gun technique on the Kraken - defeating it. However, Luffy, Zoro and Sanji gets sucked into a vortex, dragging the Thousand Sunny with it as it descends further into the sea. When Brook discovers that Caribou is on board, Franky confines him in a barrel. Nami tells the others that they entered a zone containing volcanic eruptions, and if it erupts, the Straw Hats will perish. Franky uses the Coup de Burst to travel farther into the ocean. Franky realizes that with each Coup de Burst, the crew has lost a large amount of air. As they are attacked by Ankoro, an anglerfish, a sea bonze named Wadatsumi hits Ankoro. Just as the crew thinks they are saved, a ship known as the Flying Dutchman appears, much to their horror.
526	10	"Undersea Volcanic Eruption! Drifting to the Fishman Island!"; Transliteration: "Kaitei Kazan Funka! Nagasarete Gyojin-tō" (Japanese: 海底火山噴火！流されて魚人島)	Takahiro Imamura	Yoshiyuki Suga	December 4, 2011	February 20, 2022
The captain of the Flying Dutchman reveals himself as Vander Decken IX. He orders Wadatsumi and Ankoro to kill the Straw Hats. Franky realizes that he cannot use the Coup de Burst to flee, as the Thousand Sunny will run out of fuel. However, Luffy, Sanji and Zoro arrive with the Kraken, who was named Surume, and rescues the others by defeating Wadatsumi. However, a volcanic eruption causes Decken and his crew to flee. Using Surume as a guide, the Straw Hats go even deeper into the sea. Despite Usopp use of the Green Star: Sargasso technique to stop the avalanche, Surume is knocked out and the crew descends 10,000 meters below. The Straw Hats are eventually cornered by another fishman crew.
527	11	"Landing at the Fishman Island! Beautiful Mermaids!"; Transliteration: "Gyojin-tō Jōriku - Uruwashiki Ningyo-tachi" (Japanese: 魚人島上陸 うるわしき人魚たち)	Yutaka Nakashima	Hirohiko Kamisaka	December 11, 2011	February 27, 2022
One of the fishmen surrounding the Straw Hats says that his name is Hammond and he is a member of the New Fishman Pirates. He offers Luffy to join them, but is turned down. Meanwhile, the others use one final Coup De Burst on the Thousand Sunny to flee from the fishmen and arrive to Fishman Island. Upon their arrival, the bubble finally breaks, causing the ship to enter the island and the crew to be separated once again. Luffy, Usopp, Sanji and Chopper awaken in a room and reunite with Camie. Camie reveals that not only is Hatchan recuperating from his injuries, but Pappagu is now a fashion designer at the district of Gyoverly Hills. The five travel to the district together and meet the local mermaids, much to Sanji's happiness. Meanwhile, Hammond is ordered by his captain Hordy Jones to bring Luffy to him.
528	12	"Excitement Blow-out! Sanji's Life Under Threat!"; Transliteration: "Kōfun Bakuhatsu! Sanji Seimei no Kiki!" (Japanese: 興奮爆発！サンジ生命の危機！)	Naoyuki Itō	Jin Tanaka	December 18, 2011	February 27, 2022
Nami has survived by landing on another part of Fishman Island. Using his Coup De Vent technique, Franky rescues Robin and regroups with Nami. Meanwhile, the five Medaka Mermaid Quintuplets inform the others that a royal ship is arriving. When the royal ship finally arrives with the three princes Fukaboshi, Manboshi and Ryuboshi, Sanji is forced to hide from them. However, Sanji suffers a massive nosebleed, rendering him unconscious, and the three princes have the Ammo Knights attack Luffy and the others. Meanwhile, Zoro awakens in another part of the island and are suddenly confronted with another group of the Ammo Knights. When Chopper asks the others if the fishmen can donate blood to Sanji, Hammond and the others appear and refuse his offer. Using Gear Second, Luffy attacks the pirates and uses his Haki technique on the Sea King. Luffy, Keimi and the others depart with the royal princes' ship. Fukaboshi tells the mermaids that Luffy is a well-known pirate, as he can not go through immigration, and they were going to give Jimbei's message before Luffy departed.
529	13	"The Fishman Island Will Be Annihilated?! Sharley's Prophecy!"; Transliteration: "Gyojin-tō Metsubō!? Shārī no Yogen" (Japanese: 魚人島滅亡!? シャーリーの予言)	Yoshihiro Ueda	Hirohiko Kamisaka	December 25, 2011	March 6, 2022
Sanji is given a transfusion from two okamas on the Mermaid Cafe, a local restaurant in the port town of Coral Hill. Chopper reveals that not only has Luffy been poisoned, but thanks to the captain's battle with Magellan, he has built up an immunity to it. Meanwhile, Camie asks Madame Sharley, a fortune teller and proprietor of the restaurant, about Sanji and has Luffy and Usopp enter her room. It is revealed that Sharley has predicted the Great Pirate Era and the past wars, including the death of Whitebeard. Later, the Straw Hats reunite with Brook and Pappagu. It is also revealed that Vander Decken had sent a letter once a week to the Princess. As a result, Neptune and his sons formed an army and have been finding Vander Decken for years. When Luffy asks about the candy factory nearby, he learns that the island is under the protection of Big Mom since Whitebeard's death. Meanwhile, Sharley is dismayed about her prediction that the island will be eventually destroyed by Luffy.
530	14	"The King of the Fishman Island! Neptune, the God of the Sea!"; Transliteration: "Gyojin-tō no Ō - Kaishin Nepuchūn!" (Japanese: 魚人島の王 海神ネプチューン！)	Directed by : Ayako Hiraike; Storyboarded by : Hiroaki Miyamoto	Yoshiyuki Suga	January 8, 2012	March 6, 2022
In the open sea, Gyro remembers the time when he was attacked by the New Fishman Pirates and vowing never to return to Fishman Island. Meanwhile, on Fishman Island, Nami reunites with Luffy, Camie, Pappagu, Usopp, and Brook and the crew gets free merchandise from Pappagu's shop. Neptune, the island's king, appears with his whale Hoe and the shark Megalo before them. When Neptune offers the pirates to go to the Ryugu Palace for a banquet, they accept and depart for the palace. Meanwhile, Hordy uses Energy Steroids to destroy Gyro's ship with only his jaws while his hands were cuffed together. Zeo, another one of Hordy's subordinates, reveals that fishmen have 10 times the strength as humans and an Energy Steroid increases their powers double that for each pill they take. It is also revealed that the humans destroyed the wills of both Fisher Tiger and Arlong. He has his crew go to the island to kill Neptune and make the fishman a superior race.
531	15	"The Ryugu Palace! Taken by the Shark That They Saved!"; Transliteration: "Ryūgū-jō! Tasuketa Same ni Tsurerarete" (Japanese: 竜宮城！助けた鮫に連れられて)	Gō Koga	Jin Tanaka	January 15, 2012	March 13, 2022
On Fishman Island, Caribou breaks out of the barrel and traps Ishilly and the mermaids with his Swamp-Swamp Fruit powers. Fukaboshi learns that Sharley did have a vision of Luffy destroying the island, and tells the fortune teller that he must deal with the Straw Hats at once. Meanwhile, the Straw Hats finally reach Ryugu Palace for their banquet. While there, Nami reveals that Robin is looking for clues on an important history and Franky is searching for Tom's relative. Neptune reveals that Fishman Island is powered by the roots of the Sunlight Tree Eve and also supply air to the ocean. The Ministers of the Left and Right, the king's advisors, scold him for leaving the palace unharmed and tells the Straw Hats that they received a message from Fukaboshi. Meanwhile, Luffy goes into the castle's hard-shell tower, discovering food there. However, while running towards it, he unknowingly stumbles upon a gigantic mermaid princess. The princess confronts Luffy, saying that she is not afraid as she is the daughter of King Neptune, before bursting into tears.
532	16	"A Coward and a Crybaby! The Princess in the Hard Shell Tower!"; Transliteration: "Yowamushi de Nakimushi! Kōkaku-tō no Ningyo Hime" (Japanese: 弱虫で泣き虫！硬殻塔の人魚姫)	Aya Komaki	Tomohiro Nakayama	January 22, 2012	March 13, 2022
On the sea floor, Vander Decken IX reveals that he plans to marry the princess, using his Mark-Mark Fruit curse to throw a giant axe at her. Meanwhile, at Ryugu Palace, the Minister of the Left accuses the Straw Hats for the conspiracy of destroying the Island and kidnapping the mermaids. Luffy saves the princess by stopping the axe. When the palace guards rush in, the princess hides Luffy and is told that the Straw Hat Pirates will be detained in the castle's dungeons, as Zoro has been captured. The princess apologizes for her rudeness and allows Luffy to eat her food, revealing that her name is Shirahoshi. She then reveals that she was in the tower for 10 years. After being accidentally insulted by Luffy, Shirahoshi reveals that she wants to see a lot of places and Luffy immediately orders her to leave with him. Meanwhile, Nami, Usopp and Brook confront the palace guards just as Zoro, who has escaped from the guards, arrives. On the Noah, Decken meets Hordy, and the two fishmen form an alliance to plot the complete destruction of Fishman Island.
533	17	"It's an Emergency! The Ryugu Palace Is Occupied!"; Transliteration: "Kinkyū Jitai Hassei - Senkyo Sareta Ryūgū-jō" (Japanese: 緊急事態発生 占拠された竜宮城)	Directed by : Hiroyuki Satō; Storyboarded by : Tetsuya Endō	Hirohiko Kamisaka	January 29, 2012	March 20, 2022
At the Ryugu Palace, Nami, Usopp, Brook and Zoro tie up King Neptune, the Ministers and the palace guards. They have an argument over whether their next plan should be. However, Nami reveals that she drained the water in the palace. Just as the Minister of the Left tries to plea with Nami about the Log Pose, the princes arrive and meet up with the others. Fukaboshi tells Zoro and the others to round up the remaining crew members and tells the Straw Hats to get out as quickly as possible. Furthermore, it is revealed that Jimbei's message is that the pirates must not fight Hordy. Meanwhile, Luffy and Shirahoshi decide to go out of the palace together to visit the Sea Forest just as Decken reveals himself to Neptune. Using Megalo, Luffy and Shirahoshi flee the palace and kick Decken's pirates out of the way, much to the surprise of Minister of the Right and Brook.
534	18	"The Ryugu Palace in Shock! The Kidnapping of Shirahoshi!"; Transliteration: "Ryūgū-jō Gekishin! Shirahoshi Yūkai Jiken" (Japanese: 竜宮城激震！しらほし誘拐事件)	Takahiro Imamura	Yoshiyuki Suga	February 5, 2012	March 20, 2022
On the southeastern part of the Fishman Island, Franky and Tom's brother Den discuss about the Thousand Sunny and discovers that ships are swept away into the tides, ending up at the Sea Forest, where the ship is possibly located. At the Ryugu Palace, Shirahoshi and Luffy flee the Hard Shell Tower for the Sea Forest. Meanwhile, on the Noah, Hachi discovers that Hordy wants to seek revenge against Luffy for destroying Arlong's ambitions and will continue his will. Decken throws a knife through Hachi's back. Hachi is forced to go back to the Fishman Island, but gets shot by Decken's water arrows. Hordy rallies his troops to go into the Ryugu Palace. At Coral Hill, Sanji easily confronts and takes down the island's soldiers, much to Chopper's astonishment. The two discover Hachi, who informs them that Hordy will invade the palace before being rendered unconscious. Back at the Ryugu Palace, Brook and the Minister of the Right inform everyone about the invasion just as Hordy's men confront the Straw Hats and Neptune. Meanwhile, Luffy and Shirahoshi discuss about visiting her mother Otohime's grave in the Sea Forest. At the gravesite, Jimbei pays his respects to Otohime, saying that he never forgets her ideals.
535	19	"Hordy's Onslaught! The Retaliatory Plan Set into Motion!"; Transliteration: "Hōdi Shūrai - Fukushū Keikaku no Hajimari" (Japanese: ホーディ襲来 復讐計画の始まり)	Katsumi Tokoro	Tomohiro Nakayama	February 12, 2012	March 27, 2022
On Coral Hill, Hordy remarks that this will be the last day of the Ryugu Kingdom as the fishmen are here to drive the humans out of the island. Meanwhile, Robin dispatches a group of armed guards at a bus stop before fleeing to find the ancient Poneglyph connected to the true history. At the Ryugu Palace, Neptune reveals that Shirahoshi used Megalo to hide inside and Nami tells Neptune that they will never kidnap a princess. However Neptune cannot return the Thousand Sunny and the rest of the crew to her if she does not return safely. At the Sea Forest, Franky and Den discover the Thousand Sunny and Den reveals that he has been researching the forest. Meanwhile, Hordy and Decken finally arrive at the palace. When Decken uproots a coral and sends it off to find Shirahoshi, Decken threatens to kill the princess if she becomes another person's wife.
536	20	"The Battle in the Ryugu Palace! Zoro vs. Hordy!"; Transliteration: "Ryūgū-jō no Kessen! Zoro tai Hōdi" (Japanese: 竜宮城の決戦！ゾロVS(たい)ホーディ)	Yoshihiro Ueda	Jin Tanaka	February 19, 2012	March 27, 2022
At the Ryugu Palace, Hordy says that he will destroy Neptune's soldiers and realize Arlong's ambitions once again. He proceeds to destroy the palace by flooding it. Zoro confronts Hordy underwater, but the fishman uses his own man to prevent his attack. Zoro has Usopp and Brook untie the guards while he continues to fight Hordy. Meanwhile, while healing Hachi, Sanji and Chopper are cornered by the island's guards again. Just as Sanji says that they have been framed for their crimes, Luffy and Shirahoshi arrive and regroup with the others. The citizens of the island think that Luffy is responsible for the kidnapping. However, Megalo has reached its limit and forces Shirahoshi out. Chopper orders Sanji not to turn around or he will die.
537	21	"Keep Shirahoshi Safe! Decken Close Behind!"; Transliteration: "Shirahoshi o Mamore - Dekken no Tsuigeki" (Japanese: しらほしを守れ デッケンの追撃)	Yutaka Nakashima	Yoshiyuki Suga	February 26, 2012	April 3, 2022
The citizens of Fishman Island are left in a panic that Shirahoshi has been kidnapped by Luffy. Despite Chopper's protests, Sanji finally turns around and is petrified. Oblivious to Decken's invasion, the fishmen tie up Luffy, but Decken arrives and confronts Shirahoshi. When Shirahoshi rejects Decken's proposal, saying that he is not her type, Decken attacks her. Vowing to protect Shirahoshi, Luffy confronts Decken to the astonishment of the island's citizens and Sanji returns to normal. Luffy finally knocks out Decken with his Gum Gum Jet Hammer technique before the group flees to the Sea Forest. Meanwhile, Nami and Camie flee the Ryugu Palace and also head for the Sea Forest. At the Ryugu Palace, Zoro uses his Lion Strike technique on Hordy and seemingly defeats him.
538	22	"The Straw Hats Defeated?! Hordy Gains Control of the Ryugu Palace!"; Transliteration: "Ichimi Haiboku!? Hōdi Ryūgū-jō Seiatsu" (Japanese: 一味敗北!? ホーディ竜宮城制圧)	Naoyuki Itō	Hirohiko Kamisaka	March 4, 2012	April 3, 2022
After Zoro renders Hordy unconscious, a fishman has his captain take an Energy Steroid and attack the group again. In an attempt to flee the palace with Zoro, Usopp, and Brook, Neptune uses Hoe, but Hordy captures the group. Meanwhile, Luffy, Shirahoshi, Hatchan, Sanji, Megalo, and Chopper finally reach the Sea Forest. The group reunites with Jimbei, Nami, and Franky; Jimbei is horrified that Shirahoshi has left the palace. It is revealed that Den is Tom's relative and has accepted Franky's offer to coat the Thousand Sunny. When Luffy discovers Otohime's grave, Jimbei reveals that Shirahoshi could not go to her mother's funeral, as she had encountered the poison from Decken. Jimbei learns about the current situation at Ryugu Palace and reveals that he has sent Arlong out into the East Blue eleven years earlier to Nami's horror.
539	23	"The Haunting Ties! Nami and the Fishman Pirates!"; Transliteration: "Yomigaeru In'nen! Nami to Gyojin Kaizoku-dan!" (Japanese: 蘇る因縁！ナミと魚人海賊団！)	Aya Komaki	Tomohiro Nakayama	March 18, 2012	April 10, 2022
On Fishman Island, Ikaros orders the citizens to step on Otohime's portrait, Daruma chomps his way through the island's candy factory, Zeo and Hyozo threaten the citizens to leave if they do not step on the portrait. Meanwhile, Fukaboshi confronts Dosun to the crowd's excitement. At the Sea Forest, Nami discovers that Arlong Park is the same as Sabaody Park. Sanji forewarns Jimbei that he might not forgive the fishman due to what Arlong did to Nami as well as his suspicions of Arlong's similarities. It is revealed that the Ryugu Kingdom has suffered discrimination from humans and fishmen. He also reveals that he worked for the Sun Pirates' captain Fisher Tiger, who along with Otohime, sought peace between fishmen and humans.
540	24	"A Hero Who Freed the Slaves! An Adventurer Tiger!"; Transliteration: "Dorei Kaihō no Eiyū - Bōkenka Taigā" (Japanese: 奴隷解放の英雄 冒険家タイガー)	Directed by : Hiroyuki Satō; Storyboarded by : Hiroyuki Satō & Yoshihiro Ueda	Jin Tanaka	March 25, 2012	April 17, 2022
A flashback of Tiger and Jimbei's life is shown. Sixteen years before the Straw Hats enter Fishman Island, Queen Otohime confronts a thief. However, her hand is seriously injured. Despite this, Otohime berates the thief for raising children on the money that he has stolen and makes him promise to become a better man. Otohime announces that the Ryugu Kingdom must surface and unsuccessfully tries to sign a petition for equality between humans and fishmen. Meanwhile, Arlong and Jimbei have a disagreement over Otohime's intentions just as Tiger arrives. Later, Tiger becomes an adventurer, Arlong goes up to the surface, Macro becomes a slave trader and Jimbei joins the army. As Tiger arrives back from Mariejois, the four form the Sun Pirates, who soon become known to fight Marines and considers freeing enslaved people as crimes.
541	25	"Kizaru Appears! A Trap to Catch Tiger!"; Transliteration: "Kizaru Tōjō! Taigā o Nerau Wana!" (Japanese: 黄猿登場！タイガーを狙う罠！)	Yoshihiro Ueda	Tomohiro Nakayama	April 1, 2012	April 17, 2022
At Fishman Island, everyone celebrates Tiger's attack on Mariejois. Hordy, however, cheers them on for their goal to kill humans. Meanwhile, despite Tiger's objections, Arlong kills a human for stating that it is sinful to kill one. Tiger informs everyone that killing them would be bad as humans, and even further, reveals that the Sun Pirates are about freedom and liberation. Arlong, however, states that they should kill humans and make an example out of them, but Jimbei knocks him out. Otohime gains support for her petition and Tiger obtains a bounty on his head. Three years later, Tiger is asked to take Koala, a young slave girl, but Arlong attacks her. Tiger gives Koala the mark of the Sun Pirates and tells her that his crew will take her home.
Toriko x One Piece Collaboration Special
542	26	"A Team Is Formed! Save Chopper"; Transliteration: "Chīmu Kessei! Choppā o Sukue" (Japanese: チーム結成！チョッパーを救え)	Tetsuya Endō & Yutaka Nakashima	Isao Murayama	April 8, 2012 (Note: This episode originally aired as second half of a one hour TV special alongside Toriko. In North America, it was skipped during Funimation's simulcast and subsequently released by Crunchyroll on October 18, 2014.)	N/A
Toriko and Luffy continue their search for the ingredients to save Chopper on To-Chuka Island. Note: This episode concludes a crossover which began in Episode 51 of Toriko. Due to licensing restrictions, Funimation skipped this episode in every official release.
Fish-Man Island
543	27	"The Death of the Hero! A Shocking Truth of Tiger!"; Transliteration: "Eiyū no Saigo - Taigā Shōgeki no Shinjitsu" (Japanese: 英雄の最期 タイガー衝撃の真実)	Directed by : Yoshihiro Ueda; Storyboarded by : Katsumi Tokoro	Yoshiyuki Suga	April 15, 2012	April 24, 2022
On the Sun Pirates' ship, Aladdin, the crew's doctor, allows Hatchan to let Koala do as she pleases, but Arlong tells her that he wants to kill the girl. It is revealed to Jimbei that humans do not know anything about fishmen. Over time, Koala bonds with the Sun Pirates. Three weeks later, they arrive at her homeland, Foulshoot Island. Koala reunites with her mother and bids farewell to Tiger and his crew. However, a group of Marines led by Strawberry appear and wound Tiger, giving him seconds to live. At the sick bay, Tiger tells his crew that he will not allow human blood to be donated to him. Before his death, Tiger informs the Sun Pirates that he was never on a voyage and stayed at Mariejois as a slave; he begs them not to reveal what happened at Mariejois.
544	28	"The Sun Pirates Split! Jimbei vs. Arlong!"; Transliteration: "Kaizokudan Bunretsu - Jinbē tai Āron" (Japanese: 海賊団分裂 ジンベエVS(たい)アーロン)	Takahiro Imamura	Jin Tanaka	April 22, 2012	April 24, 2022
Outraged after witnessing the death of Tiger, Arlong returns to Foulshoot Island to kill the humans, but Borsalino apprehends Arlong. The humans take credit for Tiger's death to protect Tiger's reputation and pride. Otohime, meanwhile, decides to continue her campaign for equality and freedom. The World Government offers Jimbei to join the Seven Warlords of the Sea to promote peace for the island. Hordy, however, is dissatisfied with Jimbei's actions. Jimbei has Arlong released from Impel Down. Arlong reveals that he is a dog of the World Government, and Jimbei fights him. However, he is unable to kill Arlong due to their time together. Arlong and Jimbei go their separate ways to form their own crews.
545	29	"Shaking Fishman Island! A Celestial Dragon Drifts In!"; Transliteration: "Yureru Gyojin-tō! Hyōchakushita Tenryūbito" (Japanese: 揺れる魚人島！漂着した天竜人)	Naoyuki Itō	Yoshiyuki Suga	April 29, 2012	May 1, 2022
The Sun Pirates go their separate ways after Jimbei becomes a Warlord. Otohime, however is determined that these actions would to help her cause. A few days later, Mjosgard, a Celestial Dragon, arrives on the island and the islanders are angered by their appearance. One of the former Sun Pirates attempts to kill Mjosgard, but Otohime stops them. The queen forewarns everyone that they must not pass the hatred to their children. However, Mjosgard threatens the Queen. Shirahoshi unknowingly uses her power to summon the Sea Kings and save her mother. After Mjosgard is healed by Aladdin, Otohime decides to go to the surface to negotiate with him. Just before she leaves, she reassures to the island's citizens that everything will be all right.
546	30	"A Sudden Tragedy! A Gunshot Shuts Down the Future!"; Transliteration: "Totsuzen no Higeki! Mirai o Tozasu Kyōdan" (Japanese: 突然の悲劇！未来を閉ざす凶弾)	Aya Komaki	Tomohiro Nakayama	May 6, 2012	May 1, 2022
At the Ryugu Palace, Vander Decken proposes to marry her by using the Tamatebako in an attempt to make Shirahoshi age. Otohime returns to Fishman Island with a signed paper from the Celestial Dragons supporting her cause. The queen persuades the island's residence to sign her petition. She later tells Fukaboshi, Manboshi and Ryuboshi that the one who called the Sea Kings was Shirahoshi, and she cannot control this ability yet. The queen has the three brothers promise that they would protect their sister at all costs. Later, most of the signatures are burned. Just as Otohime attempts to save the rest of the signatures, however, she gets shot through the heart by an unknown assailant, killing her. Before succumbing to her wounds, the queen requests her family will not resent the assassin and have bravery to achieve their goal.
547	31	"Back to the Present! Hordy Makes a Move!"; Transliteration: "Futatabi Genzai e! Ugokidasu Hōdi" (Japanese: 再び現在へ！動き出すホーディ)	Directed by : Tetsuya Endō; Storyboarded by : Hiroaki Miyamoto	Hirohiko Kamisaka	May 13, 2012	May 8, 2022
Following Otohime's death, Hordy kills a human pirate and convinces the citizens that the human is responsible for killing the queen. Meanwhile, Neptune locks himself up in the Hard-Shell Tower. When Shirahoshi receives a love letter from Decken days later, the king orders his guards to look for him. As the fishmen gather at the queen's funeral, Fukaboshi appears on the Visual Transponder Snail and tells them that they will continue to fight discrimination. In the present day, it is revealed that Jimbei could not stop Arlong's tyranny in the East Blue. Sanji confronts Jimbei over what happened in the East Blue, ordering him to commit suicide. However, Nami reminds Sanji that Jimbei means no harm and forgives Jimbei, as she has no resentment towards fishmen except Arlong. Later, Hatchan reveals that Hordy will kill any fishman who is affiliated with humans just as the fishman begins to broadcast his message via the Visual Transponder Snail.
548	32	"The Kingdom in Shock! An Order to Execute Neptune Issued!"; Transliteration: "Ōkoku Gekishin - Nepuchūn Shokei Shirei" (Japanese: 王国激震 ネプチューン処刑指令)	Yoshihiro Ueda	Jin Tanaka	May 20, 2012	May 8, 2022
Hordy announces that any fishman who is associated with humans will be exiled from the island and everyone is to migrate to the surface, leaving the people of Fishman Island in a panic. He also announces that in three hours, Hordy will execute King Neptune. Using the box containing the petition signatures, Hordy also reveals that he will kill every single person who signed the petition. Lastly, Hordy states that he will kill the Straw Hat Pirates, including Luffy, for crushing Arlong's ambitions. At the Sea Forest, Robin examines a poneglyph containing an apology to Joy Boy. Upon hearing Hordy's plans, Jimbei reveals to the Straw Hats that Shirahoshi is the real threat behind Hordy's plan. Luffy and Shirahoshi prepare to go face Hordy and the New Fishman Pirates, but Jimbei stops the two. When Luffy tells Jimbei that he is going to save his crew no matter what, the fishman is forced to fight the Straw Hat captain.
549	33	"A Rift Opens Up! Luffy vs. Jimbei!"; Transliteration: "Shōjita Kiretsu! Rufi tai Jinbē" (Japanese: 生じた亀裂！ルフィVS(たい)ジンベエ)	Yutaka Nakashima	Tomohiro Nakayama	May 27, 2012	May 15, 2022
At the Ryugu Palace, Usopp, Zoro and Brook conceive a plan to escape. Brook reveals that he can remove his soul from his body. Meanwhile, Luffy and Jimbei's argument over who should fight Hordy leads to a struggle between the two. Using her Cuerpa Fleur technique, Robin returns to the Thousand Sunny, where she intervenes with Jimbei and Luffy's duel and tells them not to fight. Meanwhile, Hordy plans to drown Zoro, Brook and Usopp but the cut he received from Zoro makes him take more pills. At the Sea Forest, Sanji reveals that both the other Straw Hats and the island's citizens are in danger, and that the pirates should stay and fight. However, Luffy still insists on rescuing his crew and he and Jimbei resume their duel.
550	34	"Something Has Happened to Hordy! The True Power of the Evil Drug!"; Transliteration: "Hōdi no Ihen - Kyōyaku no Shin no Chikara!" (Japanese: ホーディの異変 凶薬の真の力！)	Gō Koga	Hirohiko Kamisaka	June 3, 2012	May 15, 2022
Hordy and his fishmen arrive at Conchcorde Plaza to execute Neptune. Meanwhile, Daruma chews through the Candy Factory, Hyozo drunkenly uses his swords to terrorize the fishmen and Zeo uses his camouflaging technique as the three head towards the plaza. On the Noah, Decken decides to shave off his head and decides to kill Shirahoshi. Meanwhile, on Fishman Island, Hordy demands more energy steroids. Fukaboshi, Manboshi and Ryuboshi begin to depart for the plaza. Upon taking more energy steroids, Hordy finally becomes muscular and his hair turns white as Neptune explains the drug's side effects. He then displays his strength to the horror of the island's citizens and army.
551	35	"The Battle Is On! At Conchcorde Plaza!"; Transliteration: "Kessen Hajimaru - Gyonkorudo Hiroba!" (Japanese: 決戦始まる ギョンコルド広場！)	Tetsuya Endō	Jin Tanaka	June 10, 2012	May 22, 2022
Neptune's army launches an offensive strike against Hordy, but they are completely wiped out and Hordy goes to Conchcorde Plaza. Meanwhile, at the Fishman District, Vander Decken is despondent at Shirahoshi's rejection and decides to kill her. Hordy is confronted by the army, but Ikaros uses a Sea Bear to attack. Meanwhile, Shirahoshi, Jimbei and Megalo leave the Sea Forest to confront Hordy. Fukaboshi, Manboshi, Ryuboshi arrive at the plaza to save their father. Upon their arrival, Fukaboshi lectures Hordy for trying to ignore the island's history of discrimination. Hordy, however, has his sea beasts attack the princes and gives Energy Steroids to his crew. Though princes defeat the sea beasts without issue, they're easily defeated by the powered-up pirates and Hordy laughs as Neptune watches in horror.
552	36	"A Surprising Confession! The Truth Behind the Assassination of Otohime!"; Transliteration: "Shōgeki no Kokuhaku - Otohime Ansatsu no Shinjitsu" (Japanese: 衝撃の告白 オトヒメ暗殺の真実)	Aya Komaki	Yoshiyuki Suga	June 17, 2012	May 22, 2022
On their way to defeat Hordy, Jimbei, Shirahoshi and Megalo are captured by Hordy's forces. They are taken to Conchcorde Plaza just as the pirates tie up Neptune and the princes. When Sharley reveals to Hordy that Luffy will destroy Fishman Island, but the fishman blasts her with a water bullet. He then reveals that he is the responsible for assassinating Otohime and also framed a human pirate for it by having him burn the queen's signatures and kill the pirate. The citizens are filled with horror at hearing the realization. When Hordy mocks Shirahoshi, the princess reveals that she knows the truth. Meanwhile, in a desperate attempt to kill Shirahoshi, Vander Decken sets the Noah on a collision course with Fishman Island, in an effort to destroy everything on it.
553	37	"Shirahoshi's Tears! Luffy Finally Shows Up!"; Transliteration: "Shirahoshi no Namida! Rufi Tsuini Tōjō" (Japanese: しらほしの涙！ルフィ遂に登場)	Hiroaki Miyamoto	Hirohiko Kamisaka	June 24, 2012	May 29, 2022
Shirahoshi reveals that Megalo witnessed the assassination and told her about it, but chose to remain silent to honor her mother's last wish. Hordy mocks her, saying such kindness is a weakness and attacks Neptune and Fukaboshi, Manboshi and Ryuboshi. Sharley informs a group of children that her predictions do not give out dates and the citizens call for Luffy to destroy the island. Just when Hordy is about to kill Neptune, Megalo finally spits out Luffy. Luffy hits Hordy with a single kick in the chest. Using her Mirage Tempo technique, Nami grabs the Celestial Dragon's letter and a group of keys to the royal family's shackles. As Robin releases the royal family and Jimbei, Franky uses the Gaon Cannon on the New Fishmen Pirates and Hoe flees with the princess. The Straw Hats finally regroup and Luffy tells the island's citizens to decide whether they are really friend or foe.
554	38	"A Big Clash! The Straw Hats vs. a Hundred Thousand Enemies!"; Transliteration: "Dai Gekitotsu! Mugiwara Ichimi tai Jū-man no Teki" (Japanese: 大激突！麦わら一味VS(たい)10(じゅう)万の敵)	Yoshihiro Ueda	Yoshiyuki Suga	July 1, 2012	May 29, 2022
The citizens marvel and celebrate at the arrival of the Straw Hats. Jimbei reveals that he made an agreement with Luffy to become the hero of the island, as he does not want Luffy to be an true enemy. Brook, Zoro and Usopp reveal that they escaped from the palace with Pappagu. The rest of the New Fishman Pirates are not concerned with Hordy being hit by Luffy. Hordy seems to be not as harmed as he should have been. When Hordy mocks Luffy, saying that he will become the King of the Pirates, but Luffy takes down half of Hordy's forces of 50,000 with his Haōshoku Haki and tells the fishman that he will become the true King of the Pirates.
555	39	"Deadly Attacks One After Another! Zoro and Sanji Join the Battle!"; Transliteration: "Ōwaza Sakuretsu! Zoro to Sanji Shutsugeki!" (Japanese: 大技炸裂！ゾロ・(と)サンジ出撃！)	Takahiro Imamura	Tomohiro Nakayama	July 8, 2012	June 5, 2022
The Straw Hat Pirates begin their attack with Luffy, Zoro and Sanji taking the lead in the fight but mostly it is the latter two of the three who begin showing their new powers and abilities from their two-year separation and training. Zoro starts showing off his newly modified sword attacks while Sanji displays a more powerful style of kicking.
556	40	"Unveiled! The Secret Weapons of the Sunny!"; Transliteration: "Hatsu Hirō! Sanī-gō no Himitsu Heiki!" (Japanese: 初披露！サニー号の秘密兵器！)	Naoyuki Itō	Jin Tanaka	July 15, 2012	June 5, 2022
The battle rages on between the Straw Hats and the New Fishman Pirates. Sanji and Zoro are competing over who can take down the most fishmen. Franky decides that this is the perfect time to test out his new vehicles with Usopp, Chopper and Nami volunteering to be the pilots. Hordy, who is getting increasingly frustrated over seeing fishmen getting beaten by humans, orders his remaining men to attack Shirahoshi, but their attempts are thwarted by the efforts of Robin and Brook. Franky then comes riding out of the Thousand Sunny on his newest weapon, Kurosai FR-U IV and tramples many of the fishmen with it. Usopp, Chopper and Nami also arrive with another new weapon, Brachio Tank V and take down many of the large fishmen. Angered by these string of defeats, Hordy unleashes his trump card, Surume and orders it to attack Luffy. However, Luffy tames Surume again and orders it to protect Shirahoshi. Luffy then rejoins the fight.
557	41	"Iron Pirate! Here Comes General Franky!"; Transliteration: "Aian Pairētsu! Furankī Shōgun Tōjō" (Japanese: 鉄の海賊(アイアンパイレーツ)！フランキー将軍登場)	Yutaka Nakashima	Hirohiko Kamisaka	July 29, 2012	June 12, 2022
In Gyoncorde Plaza, the battle between the New Fishman Pirates and the Straw Hat Pirates continues, with the Straw Hats having gained the upper hand. Seeing this, Daruma decides to join the fight, targeting the Brachio Tank V and collapsing the ground underneath it. Upon Franky also driving the Kurosai FR-U IV into the same sinkhole, he decides to reveal that he can 'dock' both new vehicles onto his body, turning him into the 'Iron Pirate' Franky Shogun, much to the delight of Usopp, Chopper and Luffy. It is revealed that Hordy has been forcing Surume to follow his commands by threatening to kill his brothers at the North Pole if he does not do as he says, and commands Surume to crush Shirahoshi. Surume originally obeys, before Luffy instead offers to save his brothers, and heads towards Hordy to fight him. Ikaros and Dosun attempt to intercept Luffy, but are blocked by Zoro and Sanji, leaving Luffy to land a blow on Hordy. Meanwhile, the giant ship Noah came into full view of the island, shocking the citizens and King Neptune the most as it's on a direct collision course with Fishman Island.
558	42	"The Noah Closing In! The Fishman Island Facing Destruction!"; Transliteration: "Noa Sekkin! Gyojin-tō Kaimetsu no Kiki!" (Japanese: ノア接近！魚人島壊滅の危機！)	Tetsuya Endō	Tomohiro Nakayama	August 5, 2012	June 12, 2022
King Neptune watches in shock over the sight of the giant ship Noah as Fukaboshi asks what is so important about a relic of the past, but the king replies that the ship must not be damaged no matter what. Luffy and Hordy continue their fight with Luffy getting the upper hand with Haki and Hordy's attacks being ineffective against Luffy. Then the ship Noah looms over the plaza and everyone who is fighting in the plaza now notice it. As the ship gets closer, Wadatsumi falls from the ship and onto the plaza. He shouts at Vander Decken to stop the ship or he'll die. Vander then shouts out his desire to kill Shirahoshi and everyone in Fishman Island because of her rejection. Hordy is furious over Vander Decken's betrayal. Shirahoshi is worried that the ship will kill everyone and so decides to use herself as a lure to divert Noah's course away from Fishman Island. Luffy decides to follow her to protect her while Hordy grabs on to the giant chains to get revenge on his supposed ally.
559	43	"Hurry Up, Luffy! Shirahoshi's Life in Jeopardy!"; Transliteration: "Isoge Rufi! Shirahoshi Zettai Zetsumei" (Japanese: 急げルフィ！しらほし絶体絶命)	Gō Koga	Yoshiyuki Suga	August 12, 2012	June 19, 2022
Shirahoshi begins swimming out to sea in an attempt to lure the ark Noah away and save Fishman Island, while Luffy gets Sanji's help to allow him to reach the ship's chains and stop Hordy. Shirahoshi then uses the palace gateway to leave the air bubble and swim out to open sea. Once the ship is at sea, Luffy is confronted by Hordy, where he realizes the extent of the disadvantage he has against a fishman in the sea. Hordy instantly bursts the bubble Luffy created with his bubble coral, but Luffy is saved from certain death when Fukaboshi intervenes. Meanwhile, Decken once again offers Shirahoshi his hand in marriage, and upon rejection, releases another barrage of attacks. These are all blocked by Manboshi, Ryuboshi and Hoe. Hordy's Energy Steroids are allowing him to catch up with Luffy and Fukaboshi. Luffy asks to go to the deck of Noah, as there will be air for him to fight there, but Hordy gets there first and stabs Decken to destroy the island.
560	44	"The Fierce Fight Begins! Luffy vs. Hordy!"; Transliteration: "Gekitō Kaishi! Rufi tai Hōdi!" (Japanese: 激闘開始！ルフィVS(たい)ホーディ！)	Yoshihiro Ueda	Jin Tanaka	August 19, 2012	June 19, 2022
Hordy takes his trident out of Decken's body and after a short fight, Decken is defeated. After that, Hordy goes after Shirahoshi, slicing through Ryuboshi and Manboshi and reaching her with the uncomparable underwater speed, grabbing her hair. Luffy attacks Hordy, and releases the princess. Zeo makes Wadatsumi think that he has to fight for the New Fishman Pirates in Gyoncorde Plaza. Wadatsumi defeats Surume and then as he attacks Jimbei and gets pushed back, he manages to bring down Nami, which gives Sanji a reason to attack him. Hyozo becomes stronger after eating too many Energy Steroids. He tries to attack Robin but Zoro jumps in front of him and stops his attack.
561	45	"A Massive Confused Fight! The Straw Hats vs. the New Fishman Pirates!"; Transliteration: "Dai-ransen! Ichimi tai Shin Gyojin Kaizokudan!" (Japanese: 大乱戦！一味VS(たい)新魚人海賊団！)	Aya Komaki	Tomohiro Nakayama	August 26, 2012	June 26, 2022
Luffy tries to protect Shirahoshi along with her three brothers helping also against Hordy Jones as the New Fishman Pirate Captain is hell bent on killing the Mermaid Princess but seems to have an ulterior motive as Vander Decken IX is slowly losing focus, consciousness and his grip on the powers that he wields that keeps the massive ship Noah (after Decken's near fatal injury from Hordy earlier) from falling towards Fishman Islands and is going to kill its occupants. Meanwhile the other Straw Hats face off against the New Fishman Pirates officers who are equally eager to finish their opponents off as everyone prepares for the fight of their lives once again as the fate of the people of Fishman Island rests on the hands of Luffy and his crew.
562	46	"Luffy Loses the Fight?! Hordy's Long-Awaited Revenge!"; Transliteration: "Rufi Haiboku!? Hōdi Fukushū no Toki" (Japanese: ルフィ敗北!? ホーディ復讐の時)	Directed by : Takahiro Imamura; Storyboarded by : Naotoshi Shida	Yoshiyuki Suga	September 2, 2012	June 26, 2022
Vander Decken IX finally loses consciousness and the massive ship Noah starts to fall back slowly onto the fishman island. Fukaboshi distracts Hordy while Luffy and the mermaid princess try to get on the falling ship. Meanwhile, on Fukaboshi's instructions, the palace guards start trying to cover Noah with a bubble of air to help Luffy fight Hordy. Fukaboshi gets defeated but manages to learn Hordy's true identity beforehand. Hordy, to fight Luffy, eats more energy steroids and powers up even more.
563	47	"A Shocking Fact! The True Identity of Hordy!"; Transliteration: "Shōgeki no Jijitsu! Hōdi no Shōtai!" (Japanese: 衝撃の事実！ホーディの正体！)	Naoyuki Itō	Jin Tanaka	September 9, 2012	July 10, 2022
On Fishman Island, Jimbei and Sanji battle Wadatsumi, who inflates in anger, crushing his allies. Sanji provokes him to grow even larger. Meanwhile, Neptune's soldiers apologize for failing to protect him, and the Minister of the Right officially joins the fight against the New Fishman Pirates, allying with the Straw Hats and Jimbei. Hammond enslaves human pirates, but Robin frees them and defeats Hammond with her Double Clutch technique. The freed slaves rebel against the New Fishman Pirates. The Minister of the Left orders an island-wide evacuation. Hordy's true identity is revealed to be a monster shaped by his environment. He claims that Fishmen like him are consumed by hatred, fearing it will fade, so they reject peace and seek to justify their actions against humans. When asked what humans did to him, Hordy simply replies, "nothing," believing he and his allies were chosen to punish humans. Their hatred, he states, is baseless and empty. With bloodshot eyes and maniacal laughter, Hordy charges at Luffy and Shirahoshi.
564	48	"Back to Zero! Earnest Wishes for Luffy!"; Transliteration: "Zero ni! Rufi e no Atsuki Negai!" (Japanese: ゼロに！ルフィへの熱き願い！)	Tetsuya Endō	Hirohiko Kamisaka	September 16, 2012	July 10, 2022
As Fukaboshi begins to state what Hordy really is, Hordy's past is revealed as he recalls his hatred towards humans, the New Fishman Pirates officers are taught as kids that the humans are an inferior species and they should be punished by heaven. Hordy becomes a Neptune Army member and he and his crew commit crimes, celebrate the death of Otohime, and start producing Energy Steroids. Fukaboshi laments how his mother was killed by the hatred of the island and begs Luffy to bring it back to zero and Luffy says he will since he and his crew and Jimbei all agreed to that and that their friends. Luffy prepares to attack Hordy. Franky continues to fight Ikaros Much. Chopper continues to fight Dosun revealing his new Heavy point. Zoro continues to fight Hyouzou and is bored that Hyouzou can't even kill his boredom.
565	49	"Luffy's All-Out Attack! Red Hawk Blasts!"; Transliteration: "Rufi Konshin no Ichigeki! Reddo Hōku Sakuretsu" (Japanese: ルフィ渾身の一撃！火拳銃(レッドホーク)炸裂)	Yutaka Nakashima	Hirohiko Kamisaka	September 23, 2012	July 17, 2022
As the fighting continues, Brook and Zeo continue their fight with Zeo landing an attack on Brook and decapitating him. Celebrating his victory, Brook showcases a new ability being able to reattach his head so long his bones are not damaged. Brook further demonstrates his new sword, Soul Solid, being able to call forth the cold from the underworld. Usopp and Daruma continue as well with Usopp planting traps and promising to snipe him within three shots. Hordy continues to chase Shirahoshi and Luffy but a Gear Second Gum Gum Jet Bazooka is unable to defeat Hordy, the fishman laughs that everything he holds dear will be destroyed. Undeterred, Luffy prepares to attack Hordy, he enters Gear Second and imbues Busoshoku Haki into his arm, setting it on fire despite being underwater, and uses his Gum Gum Red Hawk technique, on Hordy with enough force to send the flames though his chest and blasting out of his back. The New Fishman Pirates are terrified to hear their captain was defeated but the officers force the others to stay and die for hatred. The rest of the Straw Hats continue fighting, meanwhile Luffy and Hordy are on Noah and Luffy sees Hordy overdosing on the Energy Steroids even more.
566	50	"Coming to an End! The Final Decisive Battle Against Hordy!"; Transliteration: "Tsui ni Ketchaku! Hōdi Saishū Kessen" (Japanese: ついに決着！ホーディ最終決戦)	Hiroaki Miyamoto	Yoshiyuki Suga	September 30, 2012	July 17, 2022
Hordy uses to the Energy Steroids to recover and overpowers Luffy, biting him again in the same spot. Luffy retorts with another Red Hawk, but Hordy is still standing. Chopper reveals he now only needs one Rumble Ball for his Monster Point, which he now has full control of. Usopp, Franky, Sanji and Jimbei prepare to end things with their opponents. Luffy attacks Hordy with Elephant Gun and finally defeats the fishman. Hordy wishes for the Noah to destroy the island and the Fishman who have lost their pride. Brook uses his Devil Fruit powers to coat his sword, Soul Solid, with the "Chill of the Underworld" and defeats Zeo with a freezing slash Usopp uses his Green Star techniques against Daruma, defeating him with a wolf-shaped Pop Green with an shockwave-emitting nose. Chopper uses his claws to defeat Dosun, while Franky blasts Ikaros by firing a laser beam from his hands. Jimbei sends Wadatsumi flying with a powerful Fishman Karate technique, and Sanji, using his memories Kamabakka Kingdom to sets himself on fire with rage, finishes him off with a burning kick that sets Wadatsumi ablaze. Hyouzou attempts to attack Zoro from behind only for Zoro to counter and destroy his swords again and defeats him, calling him "a frog in a well". Luffy uses his Elephant Gatling technique on the ship and Hordy is finally blasted out unconscious. Luffy prepares to destroy the ship to save everyone on the island once and for all.
567	51	"Stop, Noah! Desperate Elephant Gatling!"; Transliteration: "Tomare Noa! Kesshi no Erefanto Gatoringu!" (Japanese: 止まれノア！決死の象銃乱打(エレファントガトリング)！)	Takahiro Imamura	Jin Tanaka	October 7, 2012	July 24, 2022
After defeating the New Fishman Pirates, the Straw Hat Pirates are relaxing and waiting for Luffy. The citizens of Fishman Island are cheering for him to destroy Noah and thus saving them. While some citizens evacuate the island, some recall how Whitebeard also saved the island at a point in the past and how Luffy reminds them of him. Luffy keeps attacking Noah intent on destroying it while Neptune laments being unable to keep the promise with Joy Boy stating there is no choice but to destroy it. As Luffy continues to destroy the Noah, Shirahoshi intervenes and successfully stops Luffy from destroying the ship. He realizes that Noah has been brought to a halt by a group of Sea Kings. Luffy is rendered unconscious from the wound and falls into the ship. The Sea Kings acknowledge the strength of Luffy's will. Luffy has won, Noah has stopped and the battle is finally over.
568	52	"To the Future! The Path to the Sun!"; Transliteration: "Mirai e! Taiyō e to Tsuzuku Michi!" (Japanese: 未来へ！タイヨウへと続く道！)	Aya Komaki	Tomohiro Nakayama	October 14, 2012	July 24, 2022
Following Hordy's defeat, Shirahoshi converses with the Sea Kings, who are surprised that Luffy is able to understand their conversation with Shirahoshi. They recall that Gol D. Roger was also able understand them as well. Manboshi, Fukaboshi and Ryuboshi capture the unconscious Hordy and his lieutenants. The kidnapped mermaids are found in Ryugu Palace; however, the royal treasure is missing. All charges against the Straw Hats are dropped and are praised as true heroes. Shirahoshi cries for Luffy, who is injured from his fight with Hordy, and requires a blood transfusion to Luffy. However, no one from the island is willing to help as he is a human. Jimbei volunteers, and organizes a new law for the fishmen. Jimbei saves Luffy's life and the people are overjoyed. Luffy then offers Jimbei to join his crew.
569	53	"The Secret Revealed! The Truth About the Ancient Weapon!"; Transliteration: "Akasareta Himitsu - Kodai Heiki no Shinjitsu" (Japanese: 明かされた秘密 古代兵器の真実)	Yoshihiro Ueda	Tomohiro Nakayama	October 21, 2012	July 31, 2022
As the whole island celebrates the capture and defeat of Hordy and his comrades by the Straw Hat Crew of whom make their own plans to leave Fishman Island soon while Jimbei reluctantly tells Luffy that he cannot join his crew at the moment but he will in the future when he is finished with his tasks and obligations, They are all soon called to celebrate their victory at the Palace with merriment, music, drink and food. As the party begins to wind down Robin asks and discusses a troubling and possibly dangerous secret with King Neptune surrounding his daughter, Shirahoshi, the ship Noah and the mysterious Joy Boy.
570	54	"The Straw Hats Stunned! The New Fleet Admiral of the Navy!"; Transliteration: "Ichimi Kyōgaku! Aratanaru Kaigun Gensui!" (Japanese: 一味驚愕！新たなる海軍元帥！)	Directed by : Tetsuya Endō; Storyboarded by : Gō Koga	Jin Tanaka	October 28, 2012	July 31, 2022
King Neptune tells Robin about the Ancient Weapons and Shirahoshi being one of them, while Caribou secretly listens and heads to capture her. Meanwhile, Jimbei informs Luffy about major changes in the world: Akainu defeated Aokiji to become new Fleet Admiral, leading Aokiji to leave, and Blackbeard took Whitebeard's territories, becoming a new Emperor. Blackbeard is also hunting powerful Devil Fruits, alarming Chopper, though Usopp dismisses his concerns. Luffy ignores Jimbei's explanations and, upon sensing a presence, takes Zoro and Sanji to Shirahoshi's room, where they stop Caribou from abducting her. The Minister of the Right thanks Luffy, but chaos ensues when it's revealed Caribou stole the royal treasure. Nami, furious, kicks Luffy, Zoro, and Sanji out to retrieve it. Meanwhile, Hordy and his crew suffer rapid aging from energy steroids but remain vengeful. Fukaboshi refuses to seek revenge for his mother's death, wanting to protect future generations from hatred. The Minister of the Left reports that Baron Tamago and Pekoms from Big Mom's crew have arrived for their candy tribute. With the factory destroyed and all the candy eaten at the banquet, Fishman Island faces potential destruction for failing to pay Big Mom.
571	55	"She Loves Sweets! Big Mom of the Four Emperors!"; Transliteration: "Okashi-zuki! Yonkō Biggu Mamu" (Japanese: お菓子好き！四皇ビッグ・マム)	Tetsuya Endō	Yoshiyuki Suga	November 4, 2012	August 7, 2022
As the Straw Hats wait for Luffy, Zoro, and Sanji to return with the treasure, Pekoms and Tamago arrive to collect Big Mom's candy. The Minister of the Left informs them that the candy supply was destroyed by Hordy. Meanwhile, Luffy, Zoro, and Sanji retrieve the treasure and search for transportation back to Ryugu Palace. They encounter Pekoms and Tamago and realize they serve Big Mom. On Whole Cake Island, Big Mom awaits Fishman Island's candy. Bobbin reports destroying an island, noting its sweet smell. When Big Mom learns there's no candy, she calls Tamago and Pekoms, but Luffy answers instead. He admits to eating the candy and offers the treasure as compensation. Big Mom refuses, saying she doesn't eat treasure. Tamago suggests accepting it to replace ships lost in a clash with Captain Kid, but Big Mom insists pirates don't make deals. Instead, she vows to target Luffy in the New World. Luffy boldly declares he'll fight Big Mom and make Fishman Island his own territory, setting the stage for a future showdown.
572	56	"Many Problems Lie Ahead! A Trap Awaiting in the New World!"; Transliteration: "Zento Tanan - Shin Sekai ni Machiukeru Wana" (Japanese: 前途多難 新世界に待ち受ける罠)	Directed by : Ayako Hiraike; Storyboarded by : Naoyuki Itō	Tomohiro Nakayama	November 11, 2012	August 7, 2022
The Minister of the Right realizes the Tamate Box is missing along with the treasure and recalls its dangerous secret. Meanwhile, Caribou wakes up and frantically searches for the treasure he stole. Neptune and Jimbei discuss the latter potentially joining the Straw Hats and raising their flag over Fishman Island. Later, the Minister of the Right warns Neptune that the Tamate Box might explode if opened. However, Luffy returns and reveals he gave all the treasure, including the Tamate Box, to Pekoms and Baron Tamago after confronting Big Mom. Neptune and the Minister of the Right panic over the Straw Hats' fate, while Nami beats Luffy for giving away the treasure. Jimbei decides to sever ties with Big Mom before trouble escalates. Caribou attacks Pekoms to reclaim his stolen treasure, believing his Logia powers make him superior. However, Pekoms, a Zoan-Type Devil Fruit user, knocks him out with a single punch. Pekoms and Tamago then leave Fishman Island. Meanwhile, Smoker and Tashigi, now assigned to the G-5 Marine Branch, arrest pirates fleeing Fishman Island. When the pirates tell him Luffy defeated Hordy, Smoker dismisses it already aware and calls them idiots.
573	57	"Finally Time to Go! Goodbye, Fishman Island!"; Transliteration: "Tsui ni Shukkō! Sayonara Gyojin-tō" (Japanese: ついに出航！さよなら魚人島)	Yutaka Nakashima	Jin Tanaka	November 18, 2012	August 14, 2022
The mermaids and Keimi visit Madam Sharley to say farewell to the Straw Hats. Sharley admits her prediction of Luffy destroying Fishman Island might not really come true since they defeated Hordy. However, Keimi worries that Sharley still believes in her vision. Meanwhile, Shirahoshi tearfully begs the Straw Hats not to leave. The Minister of the Right considers telling them about the exploding Tamate Box, but Neptune refuses, pointing out that Usopp, Brook, and Chopper are already panicking about the dangers of the New World. They remain optimistic by hoping that Big Mom won't open the box herself or that it simply won't explode at all. The Minister of the Left gives Nami a new Log Pose with three needles, explaining that the most unstable one points to the most dangerous island. Nami, Chopper, and Usopp try to keep this from Luffy, but he overhears and excitedly insists on heading toward the most dangerous route, declaring, "That's where the party is!" Nami insists she'll decide, but Luffy, as captain, claims he has the final say. As they prepare to leave, Shirahoshi asks for a pinky promise that they'll return, and they agree. The Straw Hats set sail, reminiscing about important lessons from Shanks, Rayleigh, Jimbei, and Ace, while looking forward to their adventures in the New World.
574	58	"To the New World! Heading for the Ultimate Sea!"; Transliteration: "Shin Sekai e! Saikyō no Umi o Mezashite" (Japanese: 新世界へ！最強の海をめざして)	Directed by : Katsumi Tokoro; Storyboarded by : Naotoshi Shida	Yoshiyuki Suga	November 25, 2012	August 14, 2022
As the Straw Hats head into the New World, Nami takes a bath on the Thousand Sunny. Chopper enters but declines her offer to join, saying he bathed two days ago. Sanji and Brook sneak a peek and get electrocuted by Nami's weather cloud as a punishment. Meanwhile, Luffy, Zoro, Usopp, Franky, and Robin relax. Luffy wants to catch a big fish, while Zoro and Usopp discuss how they'd like it cooked. They catch a fish, but a larger one swallows it. Luffy attacks with Gear Second, and Zoro finishes it off with a 360 Pound Cannon. Nami, still bathing, complains about the chaos. Suddenly, they're caught in a White Storm. Luffy excitedly calls it a "wormhole," but Usopp slaps him for being reckless. As they struggle to hold on, they crash into a whale. Brook mistakes it for Laboon, but they soon realize it's an entire pod of whales. Sanji asks Nami what to do, and she says nothing, so he obeys. Brook sings to the whales, who help them reach the surface. As they rise, the crew reflects on their training. When they finally surface, they spot ships — only to realize they belong to the Marines.
Z's Ambition
575	59	"Z's Ambition! Lily the Little Giant!"; Transliteration: "Zetto no Yabō-hen - Chiisana Kyojin Rirī!" (Japanese: Z(ゼット)の野望編 小さな巨人リリー！)	Aya Komaki	Hirohiko Kamisaka	December 2, 2012	August 21, 2022
There is a whole fleet of Neo Marine ships, one of which houses Ain and Bins. The Straw Hats fight back against a fleet of Marine ships, but it turns out to be a mirage. Huge raindrops appear out of nowhere, and the water suddenly splits. The Straw Hats wake up with different clothes. However, Sanji sees that the food he cooked is gone, so he blames it on Luffy, Usopp, and Chopper until Chopper wonders if the sea is haunted. Suddenly, the food begins to be eaten very quickly. Luffy finds the person who ate the food and it turns out to be a little girl. She attacks the Straw Hats and they fight back. It is then revealed that she ate the Mini Mini no Mi and that her name is Lily. She turns out to be a giant, though her devil fruit makes her small. She befriends the Straw Hats after they save her from drowning and wants to see her dad (this is why she invaded the Marine's fleet of ships). She then talks about food to Luffy. On the Neo Marines' ship, Ain calls Shuzo and asks why he was not there. Shuzo tells Ain that he will make a better second-in-command and that he is going after Lily's father. The Straw Hats see Marine ships coming their way who have Lily's father captive. They are heading towards Impel Down, so Luffy declares battle against the Marines.
576	60	"Z's Ambition! A Dark and Powerful Army!"; Transliteration: "Zetto no Yabō-hen - Nazo no Saikyō Gundan Tōjō!" (Japanese: Z(ゼット)の野望編 謎の最強軍団登場！)	Yoshihiro Ueda	Hirohiko Kamisaka	December 9, 2012	August 21, 2022
Nami creates a plan for the Straw Hats to rescue Lily's father, Panz Fry. Chopper, Robin, Brook, and Luffy are the diversion group while Usopp, Sanji, Zoro, and Lily are in the submarine. Luffy goes on the submarine because he finds the diversion group boring. They rescue Panz Fry, but Momonga attacks Luffy, forcing Zoro to intercept him. Shuzo attacks the marines and Panz Fry. His pet alpaca Alpacacino shoots out a cannon at the Marine ships. Shuzo attacks Panz Fry directly but is intercepted by Luffy. Shuzo then kicks Luffy into the sea. Zoro jumps into the water to save his captain, and Shuzo and Sanji get into an argument. Shuzo tells Momomga his reason why he quit the marines, much to the dismay of the rest of his crew. Luffy and Zoro then resurface and Luffy threatens Shuzo. Luffy and Momonga prepare to fight Shuzo.
577	61	"Z's Ambition! A Great and Desperate Escape Plan!"; Transliteration: "Zetto no Yabō-hen - Kesshi no Dai Dasshutsu Sakusen!" (Japanese: Z(ゼット)の野望編 決死の大脱出作戦！)	Takahiro Imamura	Hirohiko Kamisaka	December 16, 2012	August 28, 2022
Shuzo's men overpower the Marines while Luffy fights Shuzo himself and Zoro clashes with Vice-Admiral Momonga. Zoro's 360 Pound Cannon sends Momonga flying, destroying a Marine ship. Meanwhile, Nami detects a Thrust-up Stream, similar to the Knock-up Stream but smaller, and warns the crew. She orders Franky to fire the anchors, securing Panz Fry's raft, while Sanji and Lily prepare. Luffy struggles against Shuzo's long-arm fighting style but gains the upper hand by using his Haki. As Robin, Chopper, and Brook return to the Sunny, Thrust-up Streams destroy several ships. Usopp, in the Shark Submerge, is flung back to the Sunny by one of the streams. Nami directs everyone onboard, and Franky fires a Coup de Burst to escape. However, Luffy and Zoro nearly fall off when the raft breaks, but Luffy grabs hold onto it. Shuzo marks the raft with a Vivre Card before they flee. Momonga, left on a broken ship, laments their escape as Shuzo defeats him and heads after the Straw Hats. The crew lands safely, and Chopper treats Panz Fry. Lily thanks the crew, while Luffy eagerly awaits a meal. Panz Fry insists on cooking despite his injuries, feeling indebted to them. Meanwhile, Shuzo, out of torpedoes, prepares a desperate attack using his own men as human torpedoes, vowing not to let their sacrifice be in vain.
578	62	"Z's Ambition! Luffy vs. Shuzo!"; Transliteration: "Zetto no Yabō-hen - Rufi tai Shūzo!" (Japanese: Z(ゼット)の野望編 ルフィVS(たい)シューゾ！)	Tetsuya Endō	Hirohiko Kamisaka	December 23, 2012	August 28, 2022
Shuzo orders his men to be launched at the island like torpedoes and sacrifice themselves for him. He then attacks Panz Fry and Lily. Luffy faces off against Shuzo but starts to be overpowered by Shuzo and Alpacacino. Lily attempts to go inside Shuzo to explode him by growing to full size, but he senses her intentions using Haki & uses Luffy as a shield so that she ends up inside Luffy instead. Lilly then takes advantage of the situation and turns Luffy into a giant with a combination of her ability and Luffy's rubbery form. Luffy defeats Shuzo and his pet alpaca and the group gets to eat the heavenly food from Panz Fry before parting ways with Lilly & Pans Fry and setting off for another adventure in the New World. Meanwhile, Ain is talking with Zephyr, where it is revealed to him that Shuzo lost. Ain takes the blame, but Zephyr does not care since neither Shuzo nor his men will tell the marines anything. Therefore, they begin their assault on the first island in the New World, which leads to One Piece Film: Z.

== One Piece Log: Fish-Man Island Saga ==
One Piece Log: Fish-Man Island Saga, also known in Japan as Special Edited Version - One Piece: Fish-Man Island Arc, is a 21-episode remastered and condensed version of the "Fish-Man Island" story arc which ran from November 2024 to March 2025 in place of the TV anime's regular broadcast, which was on hiatus from October to April. "We Go!" performed by the Straw Hat Pirates is used as the opening theme song for the first nine episodes, while the same song performed by Hikakin & Seikin with Monkey D. Luffy (Mayumi Tanaka) is used from episodes 10 to 13, Hololive's Shirakami Fubuki, Houshou Marine and Tsunomaki Watame with Maki Otsuki from episodes 14 to 17 and Hololive English's Takanashi Kiara and Hakos Baelz and Hololive Indonesia's Kobo Kanaeru with Hiroshi Kitadani for the rest of the series. "Sailing" performed by Be:First is used as the ending theme song.

No.	Title	Directed by (Note: Remastering process)	Animation directed by	Original release date
1	"The New Beginning! The Straw Hats Reunite!"; Transliteration: "Sai Shuppatsu! Tsudou Mugiwara no Ichimi!" (Japanese: 再出発！集う麦わらの一味！)	Tatsuya Nagamine	Mamoru Yokota	November 3, 2024
Two years after the Summit War of Marineford and Ace and Whitbeard's deaths, the Straw Hats plan to reunite after training. Luffy leaves Ruskaina for the Sabaody Archipelago. Nami encounters a group of impostors claiming to be the Straw Hats, led by a fake Luffy, who threatens her. Usopp saves Nami and flees with her. Chopper unknowingly follows the fake Zoro, Sanji, and Robin. The impostors realize that Chopper is the real one and decide to take him with them. The fake Robin is then abducted by mysterious men. The Marines head to Sabaody after becoming aware of the Straw Hats' presence, with Sentomaru going there himself. Luffy bumps into the Fake Straw Hats before using Haki to defeat them. Robin reunites with Franky on the Thousand Sunny. Meanwhile, Sanji witnesses Zoro slice a pirate ship in half after he accidentally boarded it.
2	"Setting Sail! The Dawn of the Adventure to the New World"; Transliteration: "Shukkō! Shin Sekai e no Bōken no Yoake" (Japanese: 出航！新世界への冒険の夜明け)	Tatsuya Nagamine	Mamoru Yokota	November 10, 2024
While running through Sabaody, Chopper reunites with the real Nami and Usopp and learns that the Straw Hats are being impersonated. At Grove 46, a Marine observes high-bounty pirates, including the brothers Caribou and Coribou, who plan to join the Straw Hats. The fake Luffy rallies the recruits, while the real Luffy stumbles upon them. Meanwhile, Brook is cornered by Marines at a concert, but he is rescued by a Rosy Life Rider. On the Thousand Sunny, Rayleigh and Shakky update the crew on the situation. At Grove 46, the Marines confront the Fake Straw Hats and the other recruits. As a fight breaks out, Sentomaru and his Pacifistas arrive and defeat the fake Luffy, exposing him as "Three-Tongued" Demalo Black. Luffy reveals himself and destroys PX-5, then reunites with Sanji and Zoro, who take down the remaining Pacifista. Luffy thanks Rayleigh and vows to become King of the Pirates.
3	"A Shocking Revelation - A Great Benefactor, Kuma"; Transliteration: "Kyōgaku no Shinjitsu - Dai Onjin Kuma" (Japanese: 驚愕の真実 大恩人くま)	Tatsuya Nagamine	Shin'ya Kitamura	November 17, 2024
Luffy bids farewell to Rayleigh, who encourages him to aim for the top. As the Marines approach, Rayleigh draws a line to stop them, allowing the Straw Hats to reunite and set sail. They're attacked by a Marine ship, but Hancock and her Kuja Pirates intervene, surprising the crew and even a jealous Sanji when Luffy reveals he knows Hancock. The crew prepares for their journey to Fishman Island Island, with Nami explaining the ship's underwater coating. Meanwhile, Caribou plans to target the real Straw Hats and has his crew bury the impostors. Rayleigh reflects on Luffy's growth, noting his straw hat once belonged to Gol D. Roger. Franky shares that Duval and Hatchan were injured while protecting the ship, with Hatchan taken to Fishman Island Island for treatment. He also reveals that Kuma helped the crew by separating them and protecting the ship under Dr. Vegapunk's orders. Unbeknownst to the crew, they are being followed by the Caribou Pirates.
4	"A Deep Sea Adventure! A Looming Undersea Threat"; Transliteration: "Shinkai no Bōken! Semari Kuru Kaitei no Kyōi" (Japanese: 深海の冒険！迫りくる海底の脅威)	Moe Maehara	Mamoru Yokota & Ken Satou	November 24, 2024
The Straw Hats descend into the deep ocean, passing through the Euphotic and Disphotic Zones. The Caribou Pirates' ship, towed by Momoo, approaches the Straw Hats. After Momoo recognizes Luffy and Sanji, it flees. Caribou, now alone on the Thousand Sunny, attempts to attack but is captured by Franky. Nami explains that they need to navigate cold, deep-sea currents, which will lead them to the "Downward Plume," a giant undersea waterfall. They encounter a kraken, and Caribou provides Luffy, Zoro, and Sanji with the Flutter Kick Coating suits, enabling them to fight it. The trio defeats the kraken using their new techniques, but the crew is sucked into the current. Luffy, Zoro, and Sanji are separated from the group. The Straw Hats officially enter a dangerous part of the sea.
5	"Undersea Volcanic Eruption! The Straw Hats in Turmoil"; Transliteration: "Kaitei Kazan Funka! Mugiwara no Ichimi Dai Konran" (Japanese: 海底火山噴火！麦わらの一味大混乱)	Tatsuya Nagamine & Shō Inuzuka	Tatsuya Miki	December 1, 2024
The Straw Hats continue their journey to Fishman Island while searching for Luffy, Zoro, and Sanji. The crew enters a volcanic region and encounters an anglerfish, which attacks but is stopped by a sea giant named Wadatsumi. The Flying Dutchman appears, and its captain, Vander Decken IX, orders Wadatsumi and the anglerfish to attack the Straw Hats. However, Luffy, Zoro, and Sanji, accompanied by Surume, the Kraken, come to the crew's rescue. As a volcano erupts, the crew narrowly escapes and descends further, eventually reaching the entrance to Fishman Island. Suddenly, the crew is cornered by six massive sea monsters, led by Hammond of the New Fishman Pirates. Hammond demands their allegiance, which Luffy rejects. With no chance of fighting back, the crew prepares for one last Coup de Burst.
6	"Mermaids' Paradise! Landing at Fish-Man Island"; Transliteration: "Ningyo-tachi no Rakuen! Tsuini Gyojintō Jōriku" (Japanese: 人魚達の楽園！ついに魚人島上陸)	Tatsuya Nagamine & Yūsuke Suzuki	Kimitaka Itō	December 8, 2024
After rejecting Hammond's offer to join him, the Straw Hats use a final Coup de Burst to escape, causing the Thousand Sunny to enter Fishman Island and nearly drown the crew. Luffy, Usopp, Sanji, and Chopper wake up in Camie's home and learn that Jinbe has resigned from the Seven Warlords. While relaxing with mermaids, the Neptune brothers, the princes of Ryugu Kingdom, arrive to look for the Straw Hats. Sanji suffers a nosebleed and requires a blood transfusion. Hammond refuses to donate due to a law prohibiting blood-sharing between humans and fishmen. Luffy defeats Hammond, and Camie takes the crew to town to find a donor. Fukaboshi reveals that they intended to deliver a message from Jinbe but missed their chance.
7	"A Terror in the Deep Sea! Hody's Ambition"; Transliteration: "Kaitei no Kyōfu! Hōdi no Yabō" (Japanese: 海底の恐怖！ホーディの野望)	Tatsuya Nagamine & Shō Inuzuka	Yūko Fuji	December 15, 2024
Sanji wakes up after receiving a blood transfusion from two okamas. Chopper discovers that Luffy survived poisoning due to immunity from his past encounter with Magellan. At the Mermaid Café, the group meets Madam Shyarly, a fortune teller who predicted the Great Pirate Era, Marineford, and Whitebeard's death. She foresees the potential destruction of Fishman Island, linking it to Luffy. The group reunites with Brook and Pappag, learning about Vander Decken, who threatens the Mermaid Princess. Camie reveals that Fishman Island is under Big Mom's protection. In Noah, Gyro recounts being forced into the New Fishman Pirates, while Hody Jones uses steroids to boost his strength. After reuniting with Nami, the Straw Hats meet King Neptune, who invites them to Ryugu Palace. Meanwhile, Hody defeats Gyro's crew and vows to reclaim Fishman Island and overthrow the humans.
8	"A Coward Crybaby! Shirahoshi, the Mermaid Princess"; Transliteration: "Yowamushi de Nakimushi! Ningyo Hime Shirahoshi" (Japanese: 弱虫で泣き虫！人魚姫しらほし)	Moe Maehara	Ken Satou	December 22, 2024
At Mermaid Cove, Caribou escapes from his barrel with the help of mermaids and traps them in a bog using his Devil Fruit powers. The Straw Hats are wrongly accused of kidnapping the mermaids and become wanted after Madam Shyarly confirms her prophecy about Luffy destroying Fishman Island to Fukaboshi. At Ryugu Palace, Luffy stumbles upon Princess Shirahoshi and saves her from an attack by Vander Decken, who plans to marry her. Shirahoshi befriends Luffy and opens up about her isolation. Nami, Usopp, and Brook refuse arrest, and Zoro rejoins them after escaping from prison. Meanwhile, Vander Decken and Hody Jones form an alliance to overthrow King Neptune.
9	"Kidnapping?! Luffy and Shirahoshi"; Transliteration: "Yūkai Jiken Hassei!? Rufi to Shirahoshi" (Japanese: 誘拐事件発生!?ルフィとしらほし)	Tatsuya Nagamine & Miho Hirayama	Kimitaka Itō	December 29, 2024
At Ryugu Palace, the Straw Hat Pirates have captured Neptune, the ministers, and the guards. Concerned about Luffy's absence and their situation, Zoro communicates with the princes, demanding safe passage. Fukaboshi shares two messages from Jinbe: to avoid fighting Hody and that he is waiting in the Sea Forest. Shirahoshi expresses her desire to visit the Sea Forest, and Luffy convinces her to leave the palace. Chopper and Sanji find an injured Hatchan, who informs them of Hody and Vander Decken's plans. Earlier, Hatchan confronted Hody and Vander Decken but was severely injured by Vander Decken's Devil Fruit powers, which were later used to attack the palace. Luffy and Shirahoshi head to the Sea Forest, while Neptune discovers the princess's disappearance. In the Sea Forest, Jinbe reflects on the legacy of Queen Otohime.
10	"A Raid Begins! Hody and Decken"; Transliteration: "Shūgeki Kaishi! Hōdi to Dekken" (Japanese: 襲撃開始！ホーディとデッケン)	Moe Maehara	Shūichi Itō	January 5, 2025
Hody Jones and his crew launch an invasion of Fishman Island to overthrow the Ryugu Kingdom. Inside the palace, Neptune accuses the Straw Hat Pirates of kidnapping Shirahoshi and believes she's hidden in Megalo's mouth. Franky finds the Thousand Sunny and meets Den, Tom's younger brother. Hody and Vander Decken arrive at Ryugu Palace, with Vander Decken leaving to search for Shirahoshi, threatening to kill her if she ends up with anyone else. Hody, intent on continuing Arlong's legacy, engages in a fight with Zoro. Meanwhile, Robin investigates a Poneglyph in the Sea Forest, believing it holds information about the Void Century. Luffy, along with Shirahoshi and Megalo, regroups with Sanji and Chopper. However, when Megalo spits out Shirahoshi, Sanji is petrified upon seeing her.
11	"Jinbe's Confession - A Shocking History of the Fish-Men"; Transliteration: "Jinbē no Kokuhaku - Gyojin-zoku no Shōgeki no Rekishi" (Japanese: ジンベエの告白 魚人族の衝撃の歴史)	Miho Hirayama	Shigefumi Shingaki	January 12, 2025
The locals of Fishman Island mistakenly capture Luffy, thinking he kidnapped Shirahoshi. Vander Decken appears and declares that he will marry Shirahoshi, but she rejects him, leading to an attack that Luffy stops with his Gum Gum Jet Hammer. After Vander Decken's defeat, the crew escapes to the Sea Forest, while Nami and Camie also flee and head there to meet Jinbe. Zoro defeats Hody Jones but is captured along with the others, including Neptune. At the Sea Forest, Luffy reunites with the others, along with Jinbe. Jinbe shares Shirahoshi's past, including her mother's tragic death and her isolation. Jinbe admits to releasing Arlong in the East Blue, and Hatchan apologizes, thanking the Straw Hats for stopping Arlong. Meanwhile, the New Fishman Pirates are forcing citizens to disrespect a portrait of Queen Otohime. Jinbe reflects on the troubled history of the fishmen, their persecution, and the philosophies of Otohime and Fisher Tiger, who had contrasting views on race relations. Jinbe expresses uncertainty about which approach was right.
12	"Fish-Man Island's Past! Otohime and Tiger"; Transliteration: "Gyojintō no Kako! Otohime to Taigā" (Japanese: 魚人島の過去！オトヒメとタイガー)	Miho Hirayama	Shigefumi Shingaki	January 19, 2025
Sixteen years before the current events, Queen Otohime prevents a robbery and expresses sympathy for the thief despite his actions. She begins advocating for peace and equality between merfolk and humans, campaigning for the integration of Ryugu Kingdom into the human world to end discrimination. However, her efforts face resistance from many citizens, particularly Arlong. Fisher Tiger leads a raid on Mary Geoise, freeing slaves and eventually forming the Sun Pirates alongside Jinbe and Arlong. While attacking a Marine ship, Tiger emphasizes to his crew that their goal is liberation, not revenge. He urges them not to kill humans, as it would undermine their cause. Both Tiger and Jinbe soon earn bounties. Three years later, the Sun Pirates take in Koala, a young girl freed from Mary Geoise. Tiger marks her as a member of the Sun Pirates and promises to return her home.
13	"Tiger's Regret - The Future That Otohime Envisions!"; Transliteration: "Taigā no Munen - Otohime ga Kaku Mirai!" (Japanese: タイガーの無念 オトヒメが描く未来！)	Tatsuya Nagamine & Shō Inuzuka	Yūko Fuji	January 26, 2025
The Sun Pirates return Koala to Foulshoot Island, only to be ambushed by marines. Fisher Tiger is wounded and dies from his injuries, refusing to take human blood. Enraged, Arlong seeks revenge but is captured by Vice Admiral Borsalino and imprisoned. Jinbe joins the Seven Warlords and secures Arlong's pardon. However, Arlong, angered by Jinbe's decision to become a Warlord, leaves to form the Arlong Pirates. Otohime continues her movement and initially gains support. However, the citizens begin retracting their support for the petition, leading her to drunkenly urge unity between fishmen and humans. Soon after, Mjosgard, a World Noble, arrives on Fishman Island in a shipwreck. Otohime rushes to assist and prevents Mjosgard from being killed. Mjosgard threatens Otohime, prompting Shirahoshi to accidentally summon the Sea Kings, revealing Vander Decken's interest in her. Otohime accompanies Mjosgard to Mary Geoise and returns a week later with an important document.
14	"The Tragedy of Otohime - Hody Declares War"; Transliteration: "Otohime no Higeki - Hōdi no Sensen Fukoku" (Japanese: オトヒメの悲劇 ホーディの宣戦布告)	Toshinori Fukazawa	Ken Satou	February 2, 2025
Otohime returns to Fishman Island with a signed document showing support from the Celestial Dragons, successfully gathering signatures for her petition. She reveals to her sons that Shirahoshi can summon Sea Kings but lacks control over the ability. Later, a fire destroys many of the signatures, and Otohime is fatally shot. With her dying breath, she asks for forgiveness. Hody frames a deceased human pirate for her murder, inciting anti-human sentiment. King Neptune isolates himself, while Fukaboshi vows to continue his mother's mission. In the present, Jinbe admits he couldn't stop Arlong's tyranny, but Nami forgives him. In a public broadcast, Hody declares war on humans and fishmen who support them. Zoro, Usopp, and Brook are revealed to be held hostage, and Hody threatens to eliminate King Neptune and the Straw Hats. In the Sea Forest, Robin finds a Poneglyph written in the form of an apology addressed to someone named Joy Boy. Jinbe reveals that Hody is frightened by Shirahoshi's ability, as it could ruin his plans. When Luffy insists on saving his crew, Jinbe intervenes and prepares to fight Luffy.
15	"Hody's Accident! The Princes Strike Back"; Transliteration: "Hōdi no Ihen! Tachimukau Ōji-tachi" (Japanese: ホーディの異変！立ち向かう王子達)	Miho Hirayama & Moe Maehara	Shūichi Itō	February 9, 2025
16	"Shirahoshi's Desperate Cry - Luffy Begins His Attack!"; Transliteration: "Shirahoshi Hitsū no Sakebi - Rufi Shutsujin!" (Japanese: しらほし悲痛の叫び ルフィ出陣！)	Toshinori Fukazawa	Shūichi Itō	February 16, 2025
17	"Battle Royal! The Straw Hats vs. 100,000 Opponents"; Transliteration: "Dai Ransen! Mugiwara no Ichimi tai Jū-man no Teki" (Japanese: 大乱戦！麦わらの一味VS(たい)10(じゅう)万の敵)	Yūsuke Suzuki	Kimitaka Itō	February 23, 2025
18	"Fish-Man Island Faces Destruction! Noah, the Ancient Ark"; Transliteration: "Gyojintō Kaimetsu no Kiki! Inishie no Hakobune Noa" (Japanese: 魚人島壊滅の危機！古の方舟ノア)	Toshinori Fukazawa & Shō Inuzuka	Shigefumi Shingaki	March 2, 2025
19	"Luffy vs. Hody! All-Out Red Hawk"; Transliteration: "Rufi tai Hōdi! Konshin no Reddo Hōku" (Japanese: ルフィVS(たい)ホーディ！渾身の火拳銃(レッドホーク))	Moe Maehara	Yūko Fuji	March 16, 2025
20	"The Promise of the Future - The Road Toward the Sun"; Transliteration: "Mirai no Yakusoku - Taiyō e to Tsudzuku Michi" (Japanese: 未来の約束 タイヨウへと続く道)	Toshinori Fukazawa	Ken Satou	March 23, 2025
21	"Goodbye, Fish-Man Island! To the New World, the Mightiest Sea in the World"; Transliteration: "Saraba Gyojintō! Saikyō no Umi "Shin Sekai" e" (Japanese: さらば魚人島！最強の海〝新世界〟へ)	Tatsuya Nagamine & Moe Maehara	Junichi Hayama	March 30, 2025

== Home media release ==
=== Japanese ===
Avex Mode (Japan – Region 2/A)
Volume		Episodes	Release date	Ref.
15th Season Gyojintō-hen	piece.1	517–520	December 5, 2012	
15th Season Gyojintō-hen	piece.2	521–524	January 9, 2013	
15th Season Gyojintō-hen	piece.3	525–528	February 6, 2013	
15th Season Gyojintō-hen	piece.4	529–532	March 6, 2013	
15th Season Gyojintō-hen	piece.5	533–536	April 3, 2013	
15th Season Gyojintō-hen	piece.6	537–540	May 8, 2013	
15th Season Gyojintō-hen	piece.7	541, 543–545	June 5, 2013	
15th Season Gyojintō-hen	piece.8	546–549	July 3, 2013	
15th Season Gyojintō-hen	piece.9	550–553	August 7, 2013	
15th Season Gyojintō-hen	piece.10	554–557	September 4, 2013	
15th Season Gyojintō-hen	piece.11	558–561	October 2, 2013	
15th Season Gyojintō-hen	piece.12	562–565	November 6, 2013	
15th Season Gyojintō-hen	piece.13	566–569	December 3, 2013	
15th Season Gyojintō-hen	piece.14	570–574	December 3, 2013	
One Piece Log Collection	"Fishman Island"	517–535	August 28, 2015	
One Piece Log Collection	"Shirahoshi"	536–554	September 25, 2015	
One Piece Log Collection	"Noah"	555–573	December 25, 2015	
One Piece Log Collection	"Punk Hazard"	574, 579–589, 591–594	July 22, 2016	
Toriko x One Piece Collaboration Special Kanzenhan		492, 542	October 26, 2012	
One Piece Film Z Rendō Tokubetsu-hen Z no Yabō		575–578	May 24, 2013	

=== English ===
In North America, the majority of the season was recategorized as "Season Nine" for its DVD release by Funimation Entertainment. The Australian Season Nine sets were renamed Collection 43 through 47.

Funimation Entertainment (North America – Region 1/A); Madman Entertainment (Australia and New Zealand – Region 4/B)
Volume		Episodes	Release date			ISBN	Ref.
Volume		Episodes	NA	AUS & NZ	UK & IE	ISBN	Ref.
Season Nine	Voyage One	517–528	June 20, 2017	August 16, 2017	N/A	ISBN N/A	
Season Nine	Voyage Two	529–540	August 15, 2017	October 4, 2017	N/A	ISBN N/A	
Season Nine	Voyage Three	541, 543–552	October 10, 2017	December 6, 2017	N/A	ISBN N/A	
Season Nine	Voyage Four	553–563	March 20, 2018	May 9, 2018	N/A	ISBN N/A	
Season Nine	Voyage Five	564–574	May 15, 2018	July 4, 2018	N/A	ISBN N/A	
Season Ten	Voyage One	575–587	June 9, 2020	October 5, 2022	N/A	ISBN N/A	
Collections	22	517–540	September 25, 2018	N/A	July 6, 2020	ISBN N/A	
Collections	23	541, 543–563	November 13, 2018	N/A	September 7, 2020	ISBN N/A	
Collections	24	564–587	February 2, 2021	N/A	November 29, 2021	ISBN N/A	
