= Dead Frog with Flies =

1630 painting by Ambrosius Bosschaert II

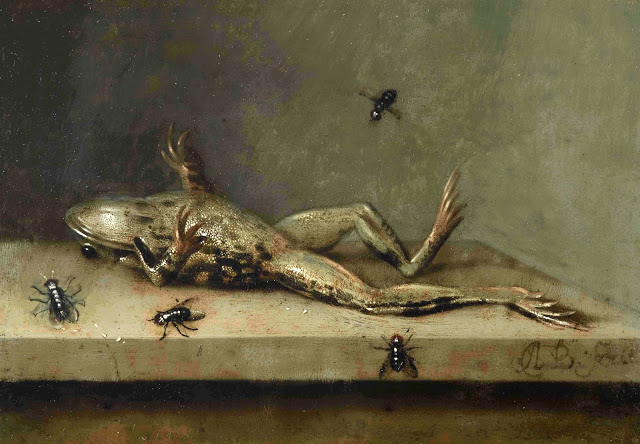
Dead Frog with Flies (1630) by Ambrosius Bosschaert II

Dead Frog with Flies is a 1630 oil on copper painting by Dutch artist Ambrosius Bosschaert II. It represents a dead frog, lying on her back on a marble surface, which starts to attract several flies.

== See also ==
- Frogs in culture
