= Bheki =

Figure in Sanskrit legend

Bheki (Sanskrit: भेकि) is the name given to a frog that symbolises the sun on the horizon in Sanskrit legend. Related myths can be found in Germanic and Celtic culture.

In the legend, Bheki was originally a beautiful woman. A king asked her to be his wife, so she married him, but only on condition that he should never show her a drop of water. One day she grew tired, and asked for water. The king gave it to her, and she sank out of his sight, just as the sun sinks when it touches the water.
