= Kupamanduka =

Sanskrit language expression

Kupamanduka/ Kupamanduka-nyaya (कूपमण्डूक) is a Sanskrit language expression, meaning "frog in a well". In Sanskrit, Kupa means a well and Manduka means a frog. The phrase is used for a small-minded person who foolishly imagines the limits of his knowledge to form the limit of all human knowledge (much as a frog might imagine the well in which it lived to be the largest body of water possible, being completely unable to conceive of anything as vast as an ocean). Equally, if such a frog looked up from its well, and saw but a small circle of sky, it might imagine this tiny disc to be the entirety of the heavens, unaware of the existence of other beings existing beyond the walls of the well and able to see the whole sky bounded by the true horizon.

Amartya Sen opines that its meaning carries a caution in opposition to insularity. Kupamanduka denotes a propensity to bigotry and intolerance and the inability to be positive, or paranoia. Mohammad Bakri Musa likens it to the Malay language phrase katak di bawah tempurong (frogs under a coconut shell). The story of the Koopamanduka is often told to children in India and forms a part of many folktales. A similar idiom (chengyu), zh:井底之蛙 by Chinese philosopher Zhuang Zhou is also used in Chinese folklore.

The "frog in the well" narrative gained traction in the West following Swami Vivekananda's speech at the Parliament of the World's Religions in Chicago on 15th September 1893, where he used the parable to explain the origins of religious intolerance.

I am a Hindu. I am sitting in my own little well and thinking that the whole world is my little well. The Christian sits in his little well and thinks the whole world is his well. The Mohammedan sits in his little well and thinks that is the whole world. I have to thank you of America for the great attempt you are making to break down the barriers of this little world of ours, and hope that, in the future, the Lord will help you to accomplish your purpose.

— Swami Vivekananda

== Examples of usage ==
- "But due to the acute paucity of scientific psychological publications in India, we often suffer the disadvantages of a kupa manduka (frog in the well) existence."
- "Arrogance and infinite faith in their own wisdom are attributes of the kupa manduka,..."
- "I think it is not that we see ourselves as a kind of flourishing Kupamanduka, a well-frog confined to a little well but a culture, a civilization, a people that has soared in the world, interacted with the world and not been afraid of interaction."

== See also ==
- Allegory of the cave
- Frogs in culture
