= What a queer bird =

"What a queer bird" is a poem, folk song, or essay that may be sung as a round. It first can be found in print in 1921. It rapidly disseminated across dozens of publications in the United States the following year, but its precise origin is unclear.

== Poem ==
The words are as follows:

What a queer bird, the frog are
When he sit he stand (almost)
When he walk he fly (almost)
When he talk he cry (almost)
He ain't got no sense, hardly
He ain't got no tail, neither, hardly
He sit on what he ain't got hardly

== Publication ==
The poem was printed in Minnesota's Willmar Tribune in January 1921, and was attributed to "A Swedish boy up in Biwabik" instructed to write an essay on the frog. In 1922, multiple United States publications attributed the poem or essay to "a young Norwegian in Chicago", with the work allegedly first printed in the Bulletin of the Chicago Board of Education. The Chicago Ledger printed the work in its "Jokes and More Jokes" section in May 1922, where the word "wonderful" replaced "queer". In July 1922, it appeared as a verse of imprecise origin in the American Consular Bulletin. When printed in the "Pleasantries" section of The Christian Register in September 1922, it was attributed as a "[c]omposition by foreigner in a Chicago night school." By 1980, it was published as a folk song to be sung as a round.

== Popular culture ==
At the 2017 Mark Twain Prize comedian Bill Murray recited the poem to recipient David Letterman while being dressed as an Elizabethan king.
