= Beautiful World Tour =

Beautiful World Tour may refer to:

- Beautiful World Tour 2007
- Beautiful World Tour (Monsta X)
