= List of Toriko episodes =

Toriko
- Cover of the first DVD volume released by Happinet Pictures in Japan on August 2, 2011.
- No. of episodes: 147 (Japanese version); 144 (International version)

Release
- Original network: Fuji Television
- Original release: April 3, 2011 – March 30, 2014

Toriko is an anime series adapted from the manga of the same title by Mitsutoshi Shimabukuro, produced by Toei Animation and directed by Akifumi Zako. The series follows the adventures of Toriko and Komatsu as they search for rare, diverse foods to complete a full-course meal.

The series ran on Fuji Television from April 3, 2011, to March 30, 2014, and was released on DVD in 25 compilations by Happinet Pictures between August 2, 2011, and July 2, 2014. The series' debut episode was part of a cross-over special between Toriko and One Piece. The anime was licensed by Funimation for a simulcast streaming and a home media release in North America.

The series uses twelve pieces of theme music: two opening themes and ten ending themes. The first opening theme, "Guts Guts!!" (ガツガツ!!, Gattsugattsu!!), is performed by Akira Kushida and the second, used from episode 100 onwards is "Go Shock My Way!!" (豪食マイウェイ!!, Gōshoku Mai Wei!!), also performed by Kushida. The ending themes are "Satisfaction" performed by F.T. Island for episodes 2 to 26, "Deli-Deli Delicious" performed by Sea A for episodes 27 to 38, "Sabrina" performed by Leo Ieiri for episodes 39 to 50, "Love Chase" performed by Tomohisa Yamashita for episodes 52 to 63, "Samba de Toriko" (サンバデトリコ!!!, Sanba de Toriko!!!; lit. 'Toriko's Samba') performed by Hyadain for episodes 64 to 75, "Lovely Fruit" performed by Nana Mizuki for episodes 76 to 87, Niji (虹, lit. 'Rainbow') performed by Jun Sky Walker(s) for episodes 88 to 98, Akai Kutsu (赤い靴; lit. 'Red Shoes') performed by Salley for episodes 100 to 111, "Tautology" (トートロジー, Tōtorojī) performed by The Dresscodes for episodes 112 to 123, "Believe in Yourself!" performed by Palet for episodes 124 to 135, and Mega-Raba (メガラバ) performed by Rurika Yokoyama for the rest of the series.

== Series overview ==
| Season (Note: The "seasons" that comprise the episode list correspond to the International release of the series outside Japan. In Japan, Toriko was aired year-round continuously, with regular preemptions for sporting events and television specials taking place, not split into standard seasonal cycles.) | Episodes | Original run | | Musical themes | |
| Season | Episodes | First aired | Last aired | Ending | Opening |
|---|---|---|---|---|---|
| 1 | 50 | April 3, 2011 | April 1, 2012 | Satisfaction by F.T. Island | Guts Guts!! by Akira Kushida |
| 1 | 50 | April 3, 2011 | April 1, 2012 | Deli-Deli Delicious by Sea A | Guts Guts!! by Akira Kushida |
| 1 | 50 | April 3, 2011 | April 1, 2012 | Sabrina by Leo Ieiri | Guts Guts!! by Akira Kushida |
| 2 | 48 | April 8, 2012 | March 31, 2013 | Love Chase by Tomohisa Yamashita | Guts Guts!! by Akira Kushida |
| 2 | 48 | April 8, 2012 | March 31, 2013 | Samba de Toriko!!! by Hyadain | Guts Guts!! by Akira Kushida |
| 2 | 48 | April 8, 2012 | March 31, 2013 | Lovely Fruit by Nana Mizuki | Guts Guts!! by Akira Kushida |
| 2 | 48 | April 8, 2012 | March 31, 2013 | Niji by Jun Sky Walker(s) | Guts Guts!! by Akira Kushida |
| 3 | 49 | April 7, 2013 | March 30, 2014 | Akai Kutsu by Salley | Go Shock My Way!! by Akira Kushida |
| 3 | 49 | April 7, 2013 | March 30, 2014 | Tautology by The Dresscodes | Go Shock My Way!! by Akira Kushida |
| 3 | 49 | April 7, 2013 | March 30, 2014 | Believe in Yourself! by Palet | Go Shock My Way!! by Akira Kushida |
| 3 | 49 | April 7, 2013 | March 30, 2014 | Mega-Raba by Rurika Yokoyama | Go Shock My Way!! by Akira Kushida |

== Episode list ==
=== Season 1 ===
| No. overall | No. in season | Title | Original release date |
|---|---|---|---|
| 1 | 0 (Note: Episodes marked "0" are crossover episodes with One Piece. These episodes are not part of the series' chronology and have been omitted from most International versions.) | "Arrival on Gourmet Island! The Gourmet Hunter Toriko Appears!"; Transliteration: "Jōriku, Gurume no Shima! Bishoku-ya Toriko Arawaru!" (Japanese: 上陸、グルメの島! 美食屋トリコ現る!) | April 3, 2011 (Note: This episode aired as the first half of a one hour TV special alongside One Piece.) |
Running low on food supplies, Monkey D. Luffy and his pirate crew discover the Gourmet Island – an island where everything is made of food – and encounter Toriko and Komatsu. Toriko mistakes Chopper as potential food, leading to a brief fight with Luffy before the two quickly clear up the misunderstanding. Working together, the two groups successfully search and capture a Hungrila bird as part of Toriko's search for rare ingredients; The group also defeats and cooks an aggressive group of Roasted Boars who attack them along the way. They spend the night sampling their spoils, when Nami and Komatsu are kidnapped by an unknown assailant. This episode is a crossover which concludes in Episode 492 of One Piece.
| 2 | 1 | "The Undiscovered Giant Beast! Toriko, Capture a Gararagator!"; Transliteration: "Hikyō no Kyojū! Toriko, Gararawani o Hokaku seyo!" (Japanese: 秘境の巨獣! トリコ、ガララワニを捕獲せよ!) | April 10, 2011 |
A chef named Komatsu asks legendary Gourmet Hunter Toriko to help capture a Gararagator. They journey to the jungle forested area of the Baron Archipelago, where Toriko observes that the normal predators are far from their deep jungle habitat. The Gararagator (an oversized alligator) emerges, but Toriko is able to kill it with his Fork and Knife technique. Afterwards, Komatsu asks Toriko about his life's ambitions, and Toriko mentions he wants to put together a Full Course Menu of Life. Komatsu asks Toriko if he can join on his adventures, and he agrees. The next morning, Komatsu realizes Toriko has eaten the rest of the Gararagator.
| 3 | 2 | "The Well Mellowed 7-Colored Fruit Juice! Pick the Rainbow Fruit!"; Transliteration: "Hōjun naru Nanairo no Kajū! Niji no Mi o Tore!" (Japanese: 芳醇なる七色の果汁! 虹の実をとれ!) | April 17, 2011 |
Toriko is commissioned by the International Gourmet Organization (IGO) to obtain the Rainbow Fruit, which is guarded by powerful Troll Kongs (four-armed large gorillas) in an enclosed sanctuary area called a Biotope. News reporter Tina follows Toriko and Komatsu through the biotope wall to try to get footage of Toriko in action. Toriko encounters a Troll Kong scout and immobilizes it with a stun gun, although he gets licked by its tongue. Toriko soon encounters more Troll Kongs but it becomes a chore to try to take all of them out. When the rain washes off the underling's scent, Toriko uses his intimidation ability and scares the Kong leader to surrender. Toriko takes a single fruit, however Tina is caught by IGO authorities and her footage is confiscated. Moved by the ever-changing flavors of the Rainbow Fruit, served in a jelly by Komatsu, Toriko declares the Rainbow Fruit as the dessert for his Full Course Menu. Meanwhile, various shady figures become interested in Toriko's movements.
| 4 | 3 | "Prepare It! The Poisonous Puffer Whale! The Heavenly King Coco Appears!!"; Transliteration: "Sabake Mōdoku Fugukujira! Shiten'nō Koko Tōjō!" (Japanese: さばけ猛毒フグ鯨! 四天王ココ登場!) | April 24, 2011 |
As the rare Puffer Whale makes its appearance once in every ten years, Toriko and Komatsu go to meet the chefs that prepare its meat. Upon arriving at their destination, they meet one of the Four Heavenly Kings, Coco, to request his help. Coco, who has the ability to see the future, agrees to help, although he foresees an aura of death around Komatsu. They enter a cave labyrinth to make their way towards an underground beach passage. It is revealed that Coco's body contains several types of poison which ward away beasts, but has also made him a target for those interested in the antibodies he produces. As they descend and approach the beach, they encounter some bats. Komatsu goes missing and Toriko and Coco are approached by a fearsome Devil Python.
| 5 | 4 | "The Deadly Cave Battle! Fire, Five-Fold Spiked Punch!"; Transliteration: "Dōkutsu no Shitō! Ute, Go-ren Kugi Panchi!" (Japanese: 洞窟の死闘! 打て、5連釘パンチ!) | May 1, 2011 |
The Devil Python cries and causes a cave-in; its acid spitting and regenerative abilities prove difficult for Toriko and Coco. Meanwhile, Komatsu is taken captive by another hunter looking for the Puffer Whale. As Coco tries to distract the Devil Python so Toriko can gather power, he is injected with its venom. However, he manages to make some antibodies for it and inject them into the snake along with his own poison, allowing Toriko to unleash his special Five-Fold Spiked Punch on it. As Toriko contemplates what to do with the meat, Komatsu and his kidnapper encounter another Devil Python.
| 6 | 5 | "The Knocking Master! Time to Taste the Puffer Whale!"; Transliteration: "Nokkingu no Tatsujin! Fugukujira, Jisshoku no Toki!" (Japanese: ノッキングの達人! フグ鯨、実食の時!) | May 8, 2011 |
As the kidnapper leaves Komatsu at the mercy of the Devil Python, Komatsu uses a special firecracker given to him by Toriko, but the shock wave causes Komatsu's heart to stop. Toriko and Coco arrive to find Komatsu alive, as he has been revived by Knocking Master Jiro, the old man from the train Toriko and Komatsu rode. They reach the Cavern Lagoon, and find a school of small Puffer Whales. By calming himself, Coco masks his presence and knocks a puffer whale. Toriko does the same. After catching about ten, Coco tries to remove the poison gland from one but fails,. He has Komatsu try, and he is able to save just one, which they enjoy in sashimi and sake. Afterwards, a mysterious creature with an anteater-like head and a fearsome aura emerges from the water with a net full of Puffer Whales.
| 7 | 6 | "The Strongest Wolf That Ever Lived! The Battle Wolf is Reborn!"; Transliteration: "Saidai Saikyō no Ōkami! Batoru Urufu, Fukkatsu!" (Japanese: 最大最強の狼! バトルウルフ、復活!) | May 15, 2011 |
Toriko, Komatsu and Coco exit the cave and find the creature had beaten up all the other hunters. Later, Tina is suspended from her job as her camera had been confiscated by the IGO due to footage on the strange creature, known as a GT Robo, which has also been attacking Biotopes and stealing Rainbow Fruit. As the IGO prepare the release of a Gourmet Hunter named Zebra in preparation for a certain enemy, Toriko and Komatsu travel to one of the Biotopes to capture the Regal Mammoth. They meet up with Chief Mansam, who tells about the Gourmet Corps, the evil organisation trying to take control of the world's ingredients and is targeting the Regal Mammoth. They then head to the Gourmet Colloseum where they view the main event, a battle royale between various creatures, including the legendary Battle Wolf. However, something goes wrong and the colloseum is filled with Battle Fragrance that causes the beasts to go wild and attack the Battle Wolf. Toriko decides to enter the arena and appears before the Battlewolf.
| 8 | 7 | "The Threat Appears! Rumble at the Gourmet Colosseum!"; Transliteration: "Arawareta Kyōi! Haran, Gurume Koroshiamu!" (Japanese: 現れた脅威! 波乱、グルメコロシアム!) | May 22, 2011 |
As Toriko confronts the Battle Wolf, the crowd is shocked to discover Toriko's appearance. Mansam discovers that Toriko entered the arena through the glass walls. Meanwhile, Tina discovers Komatsu and Mansam while filming the fight. Toriko frightens the other beasts away. The Battle Wolf collapses from exhaustion, but Toriko continues to fight the beasts. Mansem orders Rin to shut down the Battle Fragrance machine, but it continues to pour out Battle Fragrance as the machine malfunctions. Toriko manages to defeat a beast with his 5-Fold Spiked Punch technique, destroying most of the dome. Toriko announces the arrival of a new Battle Wolf. Meanwhile, Rin tries to tranquil a Demon Devil Python, but she is chased by the beast. Mansem tells Komatsu that the Battle Wolf has the Gourmet Cells, which can produce a clone of a beast. Rin leads the Demon Devil Python to the arena, where Toriko confronts the beast. Mansem confronts Dohem, whose true form is Bei. Bei defeats Mansem, while the Battle Wolf easily defeats the Demon Devil Python. Toriko then confronts Bei, who tells him that he will not be interested in eating a Battle Wolf and incapacitates the Battle Wolf with a single blast from the GT Robot.
| 9 | 8 | "That Which Is Passed Down! Activate, Gourmet Cells!"; Transliteration: "Uketsugareru Mono! Kassei, Gurume Saibō!" (Japanese: 受け継がれるもの! 活性、グルメ細胞!) | May 29, 2011 |
Komatsu discovers that Mansem can heal himself by disinfecting his wounds. Bei tries to attack the Battle Wolf and her cub, but Rin uses the Endorphin Smoke technique on him. Mansem informs Komatsu that the Battle Wolf has given love to her cub which has been passed down for generations, and that a GT Robot can be manipulated by a human. Enraged at the near-death of the Battle Wolf, Toriko activates his gourmet cells and confronts the GT Robot. Toriko uses his Five-Fold Spike Punch and Ice Pick techniques on the GT Robot in a futile attempt to destroy it. The GT Robot attempts to kill Toriko, but he uses the Five-Fold Ice Pick Spiked Punch technique on the GT Robot – destroying its head. Mansem orders his men to fire the laser cannons on the robot, revealing its core antenna. The antenna flees from the attacks but is obliterated by the beast Ricky. The Battle Wolf dies while standing up and Toriko, having befriended the cub, names him Terry Cloth. While eating, Toriko and Komatsu discovers that the Regal Mammoth has been stolen. Rin tells them that her brother has captured a Regal Mammoth on an island.
| 10 | 9 | "The Man Who Has an Invincible Domain! His Name Is Sani!"; Transliteration: "Muteki no Ryōiki o Motsu Otoko! Sono Na wa Sanī!" (Japanese: 無敵の領域を持つ男! その名はサニー!) | June 5, 2011 |
After defeating the GT Robot, Toriko, Mansem, Tina and Komatsu discover a Regal Mammoth. The Gourmet Hunter says that the Mammoth has been called a food treasure. However, a stranger defeats a group of Gang Hoods when they try to steal the Regal Mammoth. The stranger reveals that his name is Sani and is a member of the Four Heavenly Kings. Mansem tells the group that the Regal Mammoth is a child and their parents are somewhere on the island. At Mansem's request, Toriko and the others search for the adult Regal Mammoth. Meanwhile, the Gourmet Corps learn of Bei's failure to defeat Toriko and steal the Regal Mammoth. Toriko and the others discover Black Grass and Sani tells the group his Full Course Menu. Toriko tells Komatsu that the IGO has 8 worlds with different environments and beasts. However, the group discovers the giant Rock Drums. Toriko uses his Five-Folt Spiked Punch technique on the beasts and Sani eventually the last one with the Hair Net: Spatula technique. Mansem learns that a GT Robot has invaded the island.
| 11 | 10 | "Regal Isle Dash! Search for the Jewel Meat!"; Transliteration: "Shissō, Rīgaru-tō! Jueru Mīto o Mezase!" (Japanese: 疾走、リーガル島! ジュエルミートを目指せ!) | June 12, 2011 |
While the villainous GT Robots continue their search for mammoth meat, Toriko has his hands full battling an ornery Obasaurus, and Komatsu learns the powerful secrets of the Gourmet Cells.
| 12 | 11 | "The Devil's Game! Clear the Devil's Playground!"; Transliteration: "Ma no Gēmu! Debiru Asurechikku o Kuria Shiro!" (Japanese: 魔のゲーム! デビルアスレチックをクリアしろ!) | June 19, 2011 |
Toriko's daring attempt to navigate the Devils' Playground brings him face-to-face with a Soldier Frog, an Axe Ox, and an Avian Beast with hallucinogenic breath! Meanwhile, a GT Robot stalks the Regal Mammoth.
| 13 | 12 | "The Ultimate Backup! Clash, Coco Vs. GT Robot!"; Transliteration: "Saikyō no Suketto! Gekitotsu, Koko tai Jī-Tī Robo!" (Japanese: 最強の助っ人! 激突、ココ対GTロボ!) | June 26, 2011 |
Toriko's quick thinking saves Sani and Komatsu from being crushed by a mammoth, but there are greater threats looming. A giant GT Robot is ready to rumble, and the Gourmet Hunters are all out of strength.
| 14 | 13 | "The Threat Of Deadly Poison! Coco's Formula For Victory!"; Transliteration: "Kyōi no Mōdoku! Koko, Shōri e no Hōteishiki!" (Japanese: 脅威の猛毒! ココ、勝利への方程式!) | July 3, 2011 |
While Toriko searches for the priceless Jewel Meat, Sani and Coco wage separate battles against deadly GT Robots! Will Sani's hair leash and Coco's poison rifle be enough to secure victory?
| 15 | 14 | "The Unyielding aesthetic! Sani's Manly Battle!"; Transliteration: "Kyōjin naru Bigaku! Sanī, Otoko no Tatakai!" (Japanese: 強靭なる美学! サニー、男の闘い!) | July 10, 2011 |
Sani's battle with the GT Robot is complicated by the arrival of a Mega Octopus, and something extremely evil hunts Toriko and his famished friends!
| 16 | 15 | "Rin's Final Wish! Awaken, Super Toriko!"; Transliteration: "Rin, Saigo no Negai! Kakusei Seyo, Chō Toriko!!" (Japanese: リン、最期の願い! 覚醒せよ、超トリコ!!) | July 17, 2011 |
Rin's tragic end sends Toriko into a rage, but the price of fueling his passionate attack may cost him his life. Meanwhile, Komatsu takes a heroic stand when the GT Robot tries to rob the chef of his favorite knife!
| 17 | 16 | "Super Toriko, the Fist of Anger! This is the Strongest Spike Punch!"; Transliteration: "Chō Toriko, Ikari no Kobushi! Kore ga Saikyō no Kugi Panchi!" (Japanese: 超トリコ、怒りの拳! これが最強の釘パンチ!) | July 31, 2011 |
A bite of the delicious Jewel Meat energizes Toriko, who uses a vicious Ten-Fold Spike Punch to put the hurt on a GT Robot! When the dust finally settles on the battlefield, dinner will be served!
| 18 | 17 | "The Taste Written In His DNA! Toriko, Search For The Blue Blood Corn!"; Transliteration: "Dī-enu-ē ni Kizamareta Aji! Toriko, Bī-Bī Kōn o Sagase!" (Japanese: DNAに刻まれた味! トリコ、BBコーンを探せ!) | August 7, 2011 |
Komatsu must find an exquisite sauce to top a dish of very rare fish, and Toriko prepares to venture deep into the deadly Wul Jungle in search of food fit for a Battle Wolf!
| 19 | 18 | "The Talent of Battle! Show Me, Terry, King in the Making!"; Transliteration: "Tatakai no Sainō! Misero Terī, Ōja no Soshitsu!" (Japanese: 闘いの才能! 見せろテリー、王者の素質!) | August 14, 2011 |
Time is running out for Komatsu to complete his fishy dish, and Toriko watches as Terry faces off against a beastly Zombie Wood. Will the Battle Wolf show his true power, or fall to his ferocious foe?
| 20 | 19 | "For Terry's Sake! Burst By Broiling Heat, BB Corn!"; Transliteration: "Terī no Tame ni! Shakunetsu de Hajikero, Bī-Bī Kōn!" (Japanese: テリーの為に! 灼熱で弾けろ、BBコーン!) | August 21, 2011 |
Toriko and Terry finally find the deliciously elusive BB Corn, and Komatsu must depend on a special blend of spices to survive an encounter with a giant lizard!
| 21 | 20 | "The Gourmet Corps' Assassin! Toriko's Attack Instantaneously Evolves!"; Transliteration: "Bishoku-kai no Shikaku! Toriko no Waza, Shinka no Shunkan!" (Japanese: 美食會の刺客! トリコの技、進化の瞬間!) | August 28, 2011 |
Toriko must take his powers to the next level if he hopes to defeat a ravenous assassin from the Gourmet Corps. Elsewhere, Komatsu learns of the legendary ingredient with the power to stop – or start – wars! Toriko gets a new move.
| 22 | 21 | "Pressure of Madness! Grinpatch vs. Toriko!"; Transliteration: "Kyōki no Atsuryoku! Gurinpāchi tai Toriko!" (Japanese: 狂気の圧力! グリンパーチ対トリコ!) | September 4, 2011 |
Toriko continues his battle with the corn-stealing, straw-wielding villain known as Grinpatch, and Komatsu desperately races to make it home before a rare dish of fish becomes nothing more than bubbles!
| 23 | 22 | "The Amusement Park of Eating! The Bellyfull City, Gourmet Town!"; Transliteration: "Shokuji no Yūenchi! Manpuku tochi Gurume Taun!" (Japanese: 食事の遊園地! 満腹都市グルメタウン!) | September 11, 2011 |
Toriko and Komatsu travel to the city of culinary dreams for a special dinner with a living gourmet legend! Elsewhere, the sinister Gourmet Corps reveal the secrets behind their desperate desire for the Jewel Meat!
| 24 | 23 | "The Moment of Truth! Setsuno's Century Soup!"; Transliteration: "Yume no Jikan! Setsuno no Senchurī Sūpu!" (Japanese: 夢の時間! 節乃のセンチュリースープ!) | September 18, 2011 |
Komatsu and Toriko are treated to an ultra-exclusive tour of Setsuno's kitchen, including the top secret area where she prepares Century Soup! Inspired, they set off in search of the genuine article, but trouble lies ahead!
| 25 | 24 | "Meeting at the Saloon! The Powerful and Numerous Gourmet Hunters!"; Transliteration: "Deai no Sanba! Gun'yū Kakkyo no Bishoku-ya-tachi!" (Japanese: 出会いの酒場! 群雄割拠の美食屋達!) | September 25, 2011 |
Toriko, Komatsu, and a ravenous army of Gourmet Hunters set off in search of the legendary Century Soup. Their journey will take them to Ice Hell, but they'll have to survive a Sharkrocodile attack to arrive in one piece!
| 26 | 25 | "The Gourtmet Hunter Troops' Challenge! Arrival in the Frigid Hell!"; Transliteration: "Bishoku-ya Gundan no Chōsen! Jōriku, Gokkan no Jigoku!" (Japanese: 美食屋軍団の挑戦! 上陸、極寒の地獄!) | October 2, 2011 |
Tundra Dragons and killer icicles are just a few of the obstacles standing between Toriko and the Century Soup. If the elements don't kill him, there is a mean, green, GT Robot waiting to finish the job!
| 27 | 26 | "Hurry While It's Hot! A Survival Race on Ice!"; Transliteration: "Zen wa Isoge! Hyōdo no Sabaibaru Rēsu!" (Japanese: 膳は急げ! 氷土のサバイバルレース!) | October 9, 2011 |
Zonge stumbles upon a group of angry Growlruses, Toriko and company go head-to-head with a herd of ferocious Freezer Bison, and a villainous vice chef unleashes an army of beastly insects!
| 28 | 27 | "The Fiery Explosion Shakes the Iceberg!! The Masked Man's True Form!!"; Transliteration: "Hyōzen Yurugasu Bakuen! Fukumen Otoko no Shōtai!!" (Japanese: 氷山揺るがす爆炎! 覆面男の正体!!) | October 16, 2011 |
Toriko and Komatsu team up to turn a deadly Silver Grizzly into a scrumptious soup. A villainous member of the Gourmet Corps is hot on their trail, but help is on the way in the form of a Heavenly King!
| 29 | 28 | "Glorious Bug Tamer! Tommyrod vs. Toriko"; Transliteration: "Ranman'naru Mushi Tsukai! Tomīroddo tai Toriko" (Japanese: 爛漫なる蟲使い! トミーロッド対トリコ) | October 23, 2011 |
When Toriko's hand is frozen solid during a deadly encounter with a Gourmet Corps bug tamer, the burden of collecting the Century Soup falls squarely on the small shoulders of Komatsu! Is the little chef up to such a big task?
| 30 | 29 | "Gratitude and Pride! Takimaru's Full-Out Corkscrew Shot!"; Transliteration: "Kansha to Hokori! Takimaru, Konshin no Sen'nuki Shotto!" (Japanese: 感謝と誇り! 滝丸、渾身の栓抜きショット!) | October 30, 2011 |
Toriko fights to survive a deadly swarm of insects, and Takimaru fights for his life against an unbreakable opponent. Meanwhile, Komatsu's quest to collect the Century Soup is monitored by GT Robot!
| 31 | 30 | "Settled! Match and Takimaru's Desperate Attacks!"; Transliteration: "Ketchaku! Matchi to Takimaru Sutemi no Ōwaza!" (Japanese: 決着! マッチと滝丸捨て身の大技!) | November 6, 2011 |
Takimaru relies on lessons from his past to settle the score with his flexible foe, and Match puts his blade to the ultimate test against an opponent clad in Crush Turtle armor!
| 32 | 31 | "The Gourmet Reviver and the Legendary Soup's Location!"; Transliteration: "Shoku no Saisei-ya to Densetsu no Sūpu no Yukue!" (Japanese: 食の再生屋と伝説のスープの行方!) | November 13, 2011 |
Toriko heats things up in a heroic attempt to end the insect onslaught! Elsewhere, Komatsu finally reaches the location of the Century Soup – only to find that there is no soup!
| 33 | 32 | "Head-on Fight! Fierce Battle! Toriko vs. Tommyrod!"; Transliteration: "Makkō Shōbu! Gekitō Toriko tai Tomīroddo!" (Japanese: 真っ向勝負! 激闘トリコ対トミーロッド!) | November 20, 2011 |
Komatsu learns the amazing truth about his mysterious new friend, and Toriko relies on the power of his Gourmet Cells to even the odds in his brutal showdown with Tommyrod!
| 34 | 33 | "Ultimate Desperation! Tommyrod's Full-Power Mode Explodes!"; Transliteration: "Zettai Zetsumei!! Tomīroddo Honki Mōdo Sakuretsu!" (Japanese: 絶体絶命!! トミーロッド本気モード炸裂!) | November 27, 2011 |
Toriko attempts to end his epic battle with Tommyrod by unleashing a Thirteen-Hit Nail Punch, but the bug tamer counters by revealing the true depths of his devious strength!
| 35 | 34 | "Wondrous Power! Gourmet Reviver Teppei Joins the Battle!"; Transliteration: "Kyōi no Chikara! Saisei-ya Teppei Sansen!" (Japanese: 驚異の力! 再生屋鉄平参戦!) | December 4, 2011 |
The sudden arrival of a powerful Gourmet Reviver prompts Tommyrod to shed his skin, giving birth to a monstrous Parasite Emperor! The buggy beast is big and bad, but will he survive a bout with Hellboros, the ruler of Ice Hell?
| 36 | 35 | "The Last Drop! Who Will Get the Century Soup?!"; Transliteration: "Saigo no Itteki! Senchurī Sūpu wa Dare no Te ni!?" (Japanese: 最後の一滴! センチュリースープは誰の手に!?) | December 11, 2011 |
Komatsu was sad, failing to capture the Century Soup but Teppei has one more amazing trick up his sleeve. With evil forces bearing down on them, will any of our heroes live to tell of their adventure?!
| 37 | 36 | "Farewell, Ice Hell! Granny Setsu's Hidden Power!"; Transliteration: "Saraba Aisu Heru! Setsu-baa no Himetaru Chikara" (Japanese: さらばアイスヘル! セツ婆の秘めたる力) | December 18, 2011 |
After being rescued by Granny Setsu, the weary and wounded adventurers set a course for the healing country known as Life. Toriko has an arm to regenerate, and Komatsu is eager to recreate the Century Soup!
| 38 | 37 | "Splendid Healing! Here Comes the Gourmet Reviver, Yosaku!"; Transliteration: "Gōkai Chiryō! Saisei-ya Yosaku Tōjō!" (Japanese: 豪快治療! 再生屋・与作登場!) | December 25, 2011 |
Toriko's gang arrives in the healing country of Life, an amazing land of curative creatures that can treat almost any ailment. After a chance meeting with Sani, the group visits Teppei's master, a renowned – and rowdy – Reviver.
| 39 | 38 | "Race to Finish! Will It Be Toriko's Recovery, or Komatsu's Soup?!"; Transliteration: "Kyōsō! Toriko no Kanshi ka Komatsu no Sūpu ka!?" (Japanese: 競争! トリコの完治か 小松のスープか!?) | January 8, 2012 |
Toriko's recovery progresses faster than expected, but the strain of growing a new arm may cost him his life. Meanwhile, Komatsu struggles to find the final ingredient for his Century Soup!
| 40 | 39 | "To the World of Ultimate Bliss! Taste the Century Soup!"; Transliteration: "Shifuku no Sekai e! Jisshoku Senchurī Sūpu" (Japanese: 至福の世界へ! 実食センチュリースープ) | January 15, 2012 |
With the help of an unusual ingredient, Komatsu finally completes the Century Soup! Thanks to the little chef's big accomplishment, Toriko may get his arm back, and add an ingredient to his Full Course Menu of Life!
| 41 | 40 | "Housewarming Party! Everyone Gather at the Sweets House!"; Transliteration: "Shinchiku Iwai! Suītsu Hausu ni Zen'in Shūgō!" (Japanese: 新築祝! スイーツハウスに全員集合!) | January 22, 2012 |
Toriko needs to build a new candy house and contracts an architect named Smile to do so.
| 42 | 41 | "The Gourmet King Championship! Search for the Ultimate Sweets!"; Transliteration: "Bishoku-Ō Kettei-sen! Kyūkyoku no Suītsu o Sagase!" (Japanese: 美食王決定戦! 究極のスイーツを探せ!) | January 29, 2012 |
Toriko, Sani, and Coco set out on a death-defying quest to see who can track down the most irresistible sweets for a starving Seven-Color Nessie!
| 43 | 42 | "Bonding Dish! Partners Are Forever!"; Transliteration: "Kizuna no Ippin! Pātonā wa Eien ni" (Japanese: 絆の一品! パートナーは永遠に) | February 5, 2012 |
Sharkbox Turtles, Honey Dragons, and a Chomp Urchin plague the Heavenly Kings in their mission to feed the Seven-Color Nessie. Can they survive this perilous quest and satisfy the starving beast?
| 44 | 43 | "White Hot! Toriko vs. the IGO President!"; Transliteration: "Hakunetsu! Toriko tai Ai-Jī-Ō Kaichō!" (Japanese: 白熱! トリコ対IGO会長!) | February 12, 2012 |
Toriko tests out his new battle techniques – and his brand new arm – in a ferocious fistfight with the IGO President! Though his strength has improved, Toriko will need more training before he's ready for the Gourmet World!
| 45 | 44 | "Vegetable Garden in the Heavens! Vegetable Sky!"; Transliteration: "Tenkū no Yasai-batake Bejitaburu Sukai!" (Japanese: 天空の野菜畑・ベジタブルスカイ!) | February 19, 2012 |
Toriko begins his training with a mission to collect the delicious Ozone Grass. Komatsu is along for the ride, but is the little chef ready for brutal battles against Flying Sea Lions, Air Gorillas, and a Killer Bean Tree!?
| 46 | 45 | "Discovery! The King of Vegetables, Ozone Grass!"; Transliteration: "Hakken! Yasai no Ōsama Ozon-sō!" (Japanese: 発見! 野菜の王様オゾン草!) | February 26, 2012 |
Toriko and Komatsu continue their quest to collect the Ozone Grass, but their journey only grows more difficult. Before they arrive at the garden in the sky, they must pass through a deadly thunderstorm!
| 47 | 46 | "Confession in the Heavens! The Formation of the Invincible Duo!"; Transliteration: "Ōzora no Kokuhaku! Fumetsu no Konbi Kessei!" (Japanese: 大空の告白! 不滅のコンビ結成!) | March 4, 2012 |
Toriko and Komatsu finally reach the Ozone Grass, but the legendary ingredient proves challenging to harvest. As the culinary adventurers struggle to satisfy their appetites, something sinister watches the scene unfold!
| 48 | 47 | "Shocking Encounter! A Mysterious Life Form Appears!"; Transliteration: "Shōgeki no Deai! Nazo no Seibutsu Arawaru!" (Japanese: 衝撃の出会い! 謎の生物現る!) | March 18, 2012 |
Before completing their mission to capture the Ozone Grass, Toriko and Komatsu encounter an unusual beast that's identical to a GT Robot. What is this new menace, and what does it want?
| 49 | 48 | "Toriko Rushes in! The Truth of the Gourmet World!"; Transliteration: "Toriko Totsunyū! Gurume-kai no Shinjitsu!" (Japanese: トリコ突入! グルメ界の真実！) | March 25, 2012 |
Eager to test his new abilities in the Gourmet World, Toriko ignores the warnings of his closest friends and goes in search of adventure! Meanwhile, Komatsu is shocked by an unexpected visitor!
| 50 | 49 | "Enter the Astounding Ringer! The True Meaning of a Partner!"; Transliteration: "Kyōi no Suketto Tōjō! Pātonā no Shin no Imi" (Japanese: 驚異の助っ人登場! パートナーの真の意味) | April 1, 2012 |
Toriko's expedition into the Gourmet World proves more dangerous than he expected, but luckily, someone back home is looking out for him. Will it be enough to keep him alive?

=== Season 2 ===
| No. overall | No. in season | Title | Original release date |
|---|---|---|---|
| 51 | 0 | "Toriko and Luffy Meet Again! Find the Seafood Fruit!"; Transliteration: "Saikai Toriko to Rufi! Kaisen no Mi o Sagase!" (Japanese: 再会トリコとルフィ! 海鮮の実を探せ!) | April 8, 2012 |
On an unnamed island, Toriko and Komatsu catch and defeat a Harusame. Luffy comes out of the Harusame's mouth and meets Toriko and Komatsu once again. However, Luffy's ship arrives and Toriko and Komatsu find out that Chopper is sick. They decide to find the Seafood Fruit and make Chopper eat it to heal the reindeer. Toriko and Luffy and his crew head off to To-Chuka Island to find the fruit. This episode is a crossover which concludes in Episode 542 of One Piece.
| 52 | 1 | "Shock! The Broken Kitchen Knife and Cutler Melk!"; Transliteration: "Shōgeki! Oreta Hōchō to Togishi Meruku" (Japanese: 衝撃! 折れた包丁と研ぎ師メルク!) | April 15, 2012 |
When Komatsu breaks his favorite knife, he and Toriko set out to find a famed craftsman who is said to forge the strongest blades imaginable. Their journey – plagued by Rock Wolves and Scale Kongs – will not be easy.
| 53 | 2 | "Tension! Toriko's Knife vs. Melk's Kitchen Knife!"; Transliteration: "Kinpaku! Toriko no Naifu Tai Meruku Bōchō!" (Japanese: 緊迫! トリコのナイフ対メルク包丁!) | April 22, 2012 |
Toriko and Komatsu are shocked by who they find waiting at the home of Cutler Melk, and the legendary Gourmet Hunter's brash nature quickly leads to a knife fight!
| 54 | 3 | "Supergravity! Conquer Heavy Hole!"; Transliteration: "Chō Jūryoku! Hebī Hōru o Kōryaku Seyo!" (Japanese: 超重力! ヘビーホールを攻略せよ!) | April 29, 2012 |
Komatsu spends some quality time with Cutler Melk's apprentice, and Toriko delves deeper into the depths of Heavy Hole, where the gravity is intense and the Barbamoths are fierce!
| 55 | 4 | "Hidden Truth! The First Melk Appears!"; Transliteration: "Kakusareta Shinjitsu! Shodai Meruku Arawaru!" (Japanese: 隠された真実! 初代 メルク現る!) | May 6, 2012 |
The intense gravity of Heavy Hole pushes Toriko's body to the breaking point. Back on the surface, Komatsu makes a shocking discovery about Culter Melk's apprentice!
| 56 | 5 | "Debut! The Second Generation's Succession and Melk Stardust!"; Transliteration: "Ohirome! Nidaime Shūmei to Meruku no Hoshikuzu!" (Japanese: 御披露目! 二代目襲名とメルクの星屑!) | May 13, 2012 |
Toriko delves into the various mysteries of Cutler Melk, including his unusual voice, and Komatsu uses his culinary skills to give Melk's apprentice a confidence boost!
| 57 | 6 | "A Work Made with All Her Might! The Completed Melk Knife!"; Transliteration: "Konshin no Itsusaku! Kansei Meruku Hōchō!" (Japanese: 渾身の一作!完成メルク包丁!) | May 20, 2012 |
While Melk's apprentice works tirelessly to craft a special knife for Komatsu, the little chef and Toriko wait eagerly for the job to be finished – and the feast to begin!
| 58 | 7 | "Super Celeb! Once in a Lifetime Gourmet Carriage Journey!"; Transliteration: "Chō Serebu! Gurume Basha no Yume no Tabi!" (Japanese: 超セレブ! グルメ馬車の夢の旅!) | May 27, 2012 |
Toriko and Komatsu take a trip on the luxurious Gourmet Carriage, but there's more to this vacation than sight-seeing and fine food. The adventurous duo is headed for the gates of hell!
| 59 | 8 | "Finally, He Appears! The Last of the Four Kings, Zebra!"; Transliteration: "Tsuini tōjō! Saigo no shiten'nō Zebura!" (Japanese: 遂に登場! 最後の四天王ゼブラ!) | June 3, 2012 |
Toriko and Komatsu explore the despicable depths of Honey Prison as they make their way to the one called Zebra. Dare they hope to survive such a deafening encounter!?
| 60 | 9 | "Unleash the Roar! The Release of the Condemned Criminal, Zebra!"; Transliteration: "Bakuon Kaihō! Shikeishū Zebura no Shi yo" (Japanese: 爆音開放! 死刑囚ゼブラの出しよ) | June 10, 2012 |
The one they call Zebra is released from prison just in time for Monster Season and a showdown with the horrifying Forrest Goblin! After he eats lunch, of course!
| 61 | 10 | "Warning Issued! Zebra Lands on Sand Garden!"; Transliteration: "Keihō Hatsurei! Zebura Sandogāden ni Jōriku!" (Japanese: 警報発令! ゼブラサンドガーデンに上陸!) | June 17, 2012 |
Komatsu voices his concerns about travelling with such a dangerous criminal, and Zebra makes some new friends after a slugfest with a savage scorpion!
| 62 | 11 | "Komatsu's Disappearance! The Desert Labyrinth of Evil!"; Transliteration: "Komatsu Shissō! Ma no Dezāto Rabirinsu!" (Japanese: 小松失踪! 魔のデザートラビりンス!) | June 24, 2012 |
A dangerous encounter with Desert Sharks leads to Komatsu's disappearance, which leads Toriko and Zebra to the foot of the Gourmet Pyramid!
| 63 | 12 | "The Sealed Voice! The Other-Dimensional Gourmet Pyramid!"; Transliteration: "Fūin Sareta Koe! I Kūkan Gurume Piramiddo" (Japanese: 封印された声! 異空間グルメピラミッド!) | July 1, 2012 |
Komatsu is trapped within the labyrinthine Gourmet Pyramid, and only Zebra and Toriko can save him. Unfortunately, a deadly Gorgonclops and a hideous Unicorn Cerberus are standing in their way!
| 64 | 13 | "Astounding! The Mysterious Ancient Manuscript and the Creature Inside the Coffin!"; Transliteration: "Kikikaikai! Nazo no Komonjo to Hitsugi no Naka no Seibutsu!" (Japanese: 奇々怪々! 謎の古文書と棺の中の生物!) | July 8, 2012 |
Zebra and Toriko must eat everything in their path in order to regain the strength needed for their daring rescue mission! Meanwhile, Komatsu struggles to survive on his own!
| 65 | 14 | "Shocking Showdown! Salamander Sphinx!"; Transliteration: "Shōgeki Taiketsu! Saramandā Sufinkusu" (Japanese: 衝撃対決! サラマンダースフィンクス!) | July 15, 2012 |
Zebra and Toriko finally reunite with Komatsu, but their troubles are only just beginning. To acquire the Mellow Cola, they must defeat a ferocious Salamander Sphinx, but they have no idea how to kill it!
| 66 | 15 | "Cooperative Cooking! Komatsu Steers Toriko and Zebra!"; Transliteration: "Renkei Chōri! Komatsu ga Ayatsuru Toriko to Zebura!" (Japanese: 連携調理! 小松が操るトリコとゼブラ!) | July 29, 2012 |
Zebra and Toriko carry out Komatsu's brutal orders as the little chef tells them exactly how to harvest the Mellow Cola. Their mission is on the verge of success when an unseen evil emerges!
| 67 | 16 | "Explosion of Combination Techniques! Taking the World's Best Cola!"; Transliteration: "Gattai-Waza Sakuretsu! Sekaiichi no Kōra Itadakimasu" (Japanese: 合体技炸裂! 世界一のコーラいただきます!) | August 5, 2012 |
Toriko and Zebra must work together to defeat the mysterious monster that attacked Komatsu. There's just one problem: the two warriors are completely out of energy!
| 68 | 17 | "The Truth Revealed! Komatsu's Will and the Identity of the Mysterious Creature!"; Transliteration: "Akasareru Shinsō! Komatsu no Ishi to Nazo no Seibutsu no shōtai!" (Japanese: 明かされる真相! 小松の意志と謎の生物の正体!) | August 12, 2012 |
Komatsu must find the courage to stand up to Zebra and tell the truth about who he wants to be his partner. Later, the horrifying identity of the mysterious monster from the Gourmet Pyramid is finally revealed!
| 69 | 18 | "Surpass Dad! Midsummer Gobbling Katsu Curry!"; Transliteration: "Chichi o Koero! Manatsu no Gatsu Katsu Karē!" (Japanese: 父を超えろ! 真夏のガツカツカレー!) | August 19, 2012 |
Toriko's trip to the beach turns into an adventure when he agrees to help his favorite curry shop track down some much needed – and very dangerous – ingredients! First on the list: Water Tiger!
| 70 | 19 | "Connecting Bonds! The Superb Gatsugatsu Curry!"; Transliteration: "Tsunagaru Kizuna! Zeppin Gatsu Katsu Karē!" (Japanese: つながる絆! 絶品ガツカツカレー!) | August 26, 2012 |
Toriko continues his heated battle with powerful Water Tiger, and Komatsu helps a heartbroken chef find the amazing curry cooking skills locked inside him!
| 71 | 20 | "A New Stage! Toriko's Determination and the Return of "Him"!"; Transliteration: "Shin Kyokumen! Toriko no Ketsui to "Yatsu" to no Saikai" (Japanese: 新局面! トリコの決意と"奴"との再会!) | September 2, 2012 |
Toriko's quest to get stronger leads the dynamic culinary duo to a remote cafe in the middle of a jet black lake. The food is fantastic, but the clientele is deadly!
| 72 | 21 | "A Flowing Food Luck! The Pilgrimage Gourmet Shrine!"; Transliteration: "Afureru Shoku'un! Junrei Gurume Jinja!" (Japanese: あふれる食運! 巡礼グルメ神社!) | September 9, 2012 |
Toriko and Komatsu visit the legendary Gourmet Shrine where they seek to increase their food luck! After sampling many delicacies and taking in the sights, Komatsu takes center stage for a surprising feat of strength!
| 73 | 22 | "Uwaaa! The Astonishing Surprise Apple!"; Transliteration: "Uwā~tsu! Gyōten Bikkuri Appuru!" (Japanese: ウワーッ! 仰天ビックリアップル!) | September 16, 2012 |
Toriko and Komatsu hope to have the element of surprise on their side as they travel to the explosive Surprise Island in search of the legendary Surprise Apple!
| 74 | 23 | "Chicken Beast's Egg! The Memories of Old Man Yocchi and His Wife!"; Transliteration: "Niwatora no Tamago! Yo~tsu chi Jīsan to Tsuma no Kioku!" (Japanese: ニワトラの卵! よっち爺さんと妻の記憶!) | September 23, 2012 |
After his recent lottery win, Komatsu wants to buy Toriko a gift. There's just one problem. The legendary gourmet hunter has his heart set on a priceless piece of land where the Chicken Beast lays its eggs!
| 75 | 24 | "Glittering Crystal! Shining Gourami!"; Transliteration: "Suishō no Kagayaki! Sansan Guramī!" (Japanese: 水晶の輝き! サンサングラミー!) | September 30, 2012 |
Toriko, Komatsu, and Sani embark on a hair-raising quest to track down the Shining Gourami, an extremely rare sea creature that lives deep within Death Falls!
| 76 | 25 | "Shocking Rapids! Giant Waterfall, Death Falls!"; Transliteration: "Shōgeki no Gekiryū! Kyodai Taki Desu Fōru!!" (Japanese: 衝撃の激流! 巨大滝デスフォール!) | October 7, 2012 |
As the quest for the Shining Gourami continues, Toriko grows more and more impressed with Sani's training. An unexpected battle with a Hippo Shark gives the rainbow-haired gourmet hunter a chance to show off his strength!
| 77 | 26 | "Sani`s New Attack! The Result of Gorgeous Training!"; Transliteration: "Sani Shinwaza! Kareinaru Shūgyō no Seika!" (Japanese: サニ新技! 華麗なる修業の成果!) | October 14, 2012 |
The devastating power of Death Falls sends Sani into a flashback where he reflects on the days spent battling beasts and honing his instincts on the Road of Three Hells!
| 78 | 27 | "Thirty Times Combo! Thirty-Six-Fold Twin Spiked Punch!"; Transliteration: "Gattai 30-bai! 36-Ren Tsuin Kugi Panchi!" (Japanese: 合体30倍! 36連ツイン釘パンチ!) | October 21, 2012 |
Toriko and Sani must team up for a powerful combination move that's their only hope for surviving the journey through Death Falls! But even if they reach the other side, they'll need help to capture their prey.
| 79 | 28 | "Cooking by Intuition! Komatsu and the Shining Gourami!"; Transliteration: "Chokkan Chōri! Komatsu to Sansanguramī!" (Japanese: 直感蝶理! 小松とサンサングラミー!) | October 28, 2012 |
Komatsu takes center stage as the little chef struggles to unlock the secret to preparing the Shining Gourami! Toriko and Sani are exhausted and hungry, and Komatsu must listen to his ingredients if he wants to feed his friends!
| 80 | 29 | "Flashy Presentation! Supreme Service With a Meal!"; Transliteration: "Do Hade Enshutsu! Shokuji ni Saikō no Sābisu o!" (Japanese: ド派手演出! 食事に最高の サービスを!) | November 4, 2012 |
When Melk the Second needs help finishing a very special knife, Toriko and Komatsu compete in a prestigious competition in an attempt to win the final ingredient needed to complete her project!
| 81 | 30 | "Supreme Chitose Ame! Komatsu and Yun's Tale!"; Transliteration: "Gokujō no Chitose Ame! Komatsu to Yun no Monogatari!" (Japanese: 極上の千歳飴! 小松とユンの物語!) | November 11, 2012 |
Toriko and Komatsu are summoned to the Gourmet Temple to help the priests and staff in creating a very special candy but during the whole process of the two assisting the Temple Priests in making and finding the special ingredient for the creation of this candy, Yun who has hitched along with Toriko and Komatsu ends up going missing making Komatsu try and search for the baby Wall Penguin before something happens to him.
| 82 | 31 | "Assemble on Autumn Mountain! Terry, Yun, Kiss, Queen!"; Transliteration: "Akiyama ni Shūgō! Terī. Yun. Kissu. Kuin!" (Japanese: 秋山に集合! テリー。ユン。キッス。クイン!) | November 18, 2012 |
Toriko, Komatsu, Yun and Terry all work with Sani and Coco, who, along with their own animal partners, each hunt for a very special ingredient and end up finding a surprise along the way.
| 83 | 32 | "Reunion! Take-chan of Fairytale Castle!"; Transliteration: "Saikai! Otogi no Shiro no Take-chan!" (Japanese: 再会! オトギの城の竹ちゃん!) | November 25, 2012 |
A sinister force is abducting the top chefs in the world, and an old friend of Komatsu's may be in great danger! Elsewhere, Toriko and Coco attempt to capture a rare appetizer!
| 84 | 33 | "Crossroads! A Chef's Destination!"; Transliteration: "Wakaremichi! Ryōrinin no Mezasu Saki!" (Japanese: 分かれ道! 料理人のめざす先!) | December 2, 2012 |
Komatsu is shocked by the lack of culinary honor exhibited by his old friend. Meanwhile, Toriko and Coco team up to open a giant treasure chest – but what they find inside leaves them baffled!
| 85 | 34 | "Dramatic Transformation! Hair Salon Barber Gourmet!"; Transliteration: "Gekiteki Henshin! Biyōshitsu Bābā Gurume!" (Japanese: 劇的変身! 美容室バーバーグルメ!) | December 9, 2012 |
Toriko and Komatsu reunite for some much-needed rest and relaxation at a gourmet barber shop. The food is superb, but their hair may never recover!
| 86 | 35 | "Gathering of the Four Kings! A Midwinter Night's Miracle!"; Transliteration: "Shiten'nō Shōshū! Mafuyu no Yoru no Kiseki!" (Japanese: 四天王招集! 真冬の夜の奇跡!) | December 16, 2012 |
Toriko, Sani, Coco, and Komatsu brave frigid temperatures and Bison Frogs as they search for a legendary tree that's entirely edible!
| 87 | 36 | "Merry Feastmas! Gourmet Santa's Present!"; Transliteration: "Merīitadakimasu! Gurume Santa no Okurimono!" (Japanese: メリーイタダキマス? グルメサンタの贈り物!) | December 23, 2012 |
Chief recruits Toriko and the whole gang to help spread tasty Christmas cheer to hungry kids across the world! Even Zebra manages a good deed by mistake, and the holiday ends with a delicious miracle!
| 88 | 37 | "Heaven or Hell!? Storming Into the Gourmet Casino!"; Transliteration: "Tengoku Ka Jigoku Ka!? Totsunyū, Gurume Kajino!" (Japanese: 天国か地獄か!? 突入、グルメカジノ!) | January 6, 2013 |
Toriko, Komatsu, and Coco venture into the Pleasure Zone on quest to track down some extremely rare Meteor Garlic, but they soon cross paths with an old friend who could use their help!
| 89 | 38 | "Appearance! The Boss of the Underground Cooking World, Livebearer!"; Transliteration: "Tōjō! Chika Ryōri Kai Bosu, Raibubearā!" (Japanese: 登場！地下料理界ボス、ライブベアラー！) | January 13, 2013 |
Toriko and the gang make a splash at the casino as they attempt to win enough cash and ingredients to gain admittance to the VIP area, but what lies ahead could prove deadly!
| 90 | 39 | "A Card Game With Your Life on the Line! Gourmet Tasting!"; Transliteration: "Inochigake no Kādo Gēmu! Gurumeteisutingu!" (Japanese: 命がけのカードゲーム！グルメテイスティング！) | January 20, 2013 |
Toriko, Komatsu, and Coco go head-to-head with Livebearer in a game of Gourmet Memory that could cost the loser all their memories of ever eating food!
| 91 | 40 | "Dead Heat! Coco vs. Livebearer"; Transliteration: "Deddohīto! Koko VS Raibubearā" (Japanese: デッドヒート！ココVSライブベアラー) | January 27, 2013 |
Coco and Livebearer continue their epic showdown, but Toriko does most of the heavy lifting, devouring a mountain of pudding and handful of acorns as hard as bullets!
| 92 | 41 | "Coco's Strategy! The Big-Miss Cards That Determine the Outcome!"; Transliteration: "Koko no Sakurya Ku! Shōbu o Kimeru Hazure Shokuzai!" (Japanese: ココの策略！勝負を決めるハズレ食材！) | February 3, 2013 |
The deadly game unfolding between Coco and Livebearer reaches an unprecedented level of danger as Toriko must face off against a fearsome Hanya Panda to avoid the agony of defeat!
| 93 | 42 | "Eat or be Eaten! Toriko vs. the Hannya Panda!"; Transliteration: "Kuu Ka Kuwareru Ka! Toriko VS Hannya Panda!" (Japanese: 食うか食われるか！トリコVS般若パンダ！) | February 10, 2013 |
Toriko's slugfest with the Hanya Panda proves to be more brutal than expected, and even if he survives, the difference between victory and defeat may ultimately lie with Komatsu!
| 94 | 43 | "Climax! The Remaining Worst Ingredients!"; Transliteration: "Kuraimakkusu! Nokosare ta Saiaku no Sokuzai!" (Japanese: クライマックス！残された最悪の食材！) | February 17, 2013 |
Toriko keeps his team in the game by surviving mouthfuls of Shock Lemons and Nitro Cherries, but if Livebearer can withstand a bite of poison potato – all will be lost!
| 95 | 44 | "The Decisive Moment! Coco's Grand Scenario!"; Transliteration: "Ketchaku no Toki! Koko no Sōzetsunaru Shinario!" (Japanese: 決着の時! ココの壮絶なるシナリオ!) | March 3, 2013 |
Coco explains his entire plan, while Livebearer cuts his pain sense and coats his intestines, but, because of Coco's plan, the coating is eaten by microbes and the casino room is transformed into a battle zone between Coco, Toriko, Komatsu, Match and his goons, and Livebearer with his goons on the other side.
| 96 | 45 | "A Taste that's Out of this World! The Actual Eating of the Meteor Garlic!"; Transliteration: "Uma sa Uchū Kyū! Jitsu Shoku Meteogārikku!" (Japanese: うまさ宇宙級！実食メテオガーリック！) | March 17, 2013 |
Komatsu gets help preparing the Meteor Garlic from a very unexpected source, and Granny Setsu is paid a visit by the IGO!
| 97 | 46 | "Pinnacle Showdown! Ichiryuu vs. the Bishokukai's Midora!"; Transliteration: "Chōjō Taiketsu! Ichiryū VS Bishokukai San Tora!" (Japanese: 頂上対決！一龍VS美食會・三虎！) | March 24, 2013 |
Toriko searches for more training ingredients, Komatsu impresses his boss with dazzling new cooking techniques, and Ichiryuu comes face-to-face with an old nemesis!
| 98 | 47 | "The Hidden Training Ingredient! Emergency Instructions from Ichiryuu!"; Transliteration: "Kakusareta Shugyō Shokuzai! Ichiryū Kara no Kinkyū Shirei!" (Japanese: 隠された修行食材! 一龍からの緊急指令!) | March 31, 2013 |
Before beginning the search for his next training ingredient, Toriko must defeat a ferocious Devil Planet Horse and then dine with a fortune telling sushi chef!

=== Season 3 ===
| No. overall | No. in season | Title | Original release date |
|---|---|---|---|
| 99 | 0 | "Run, Strongest Army! Toriko, Luffy, Goku!"; Transliteration: "Hashire Saikyō Gundan! Toriko to Rufi to Gokū!" (Japanese: 走れ最強軍団! トリコとリフィと悟空!) | April 7, 2013 |
Featured characters of One Piece, Toriko and Dragon Ball enter a race hosted by the IGO in order to win the rare Carat Sizzled Cattle meat. Goku speeds ahead but is delayed when King Kai summons him to defeat a threat approaching from space. The race ends in a tie between Toriko, Goku and Luffy, initiating a tie-breaking fight for the prize. As a battle arena is automatically formed in the stadium, the host Mr. Satan falls in and is mistaken by the audience and commentators as challenging the three competitors for the prize. The three champions accidentally destroy most of the arena, leaving only the small section where Mr. Satan was standing intact; This makes Satan the only contestant in bounds, and the official winner. Mr. Satan offers to share his prize with the other three fighters as a banquet between the three groups. This episode is a crossover with One Piece and Dragon Ball Z which concludes in Episode 590 of One Piece.
| 100 | 1 | "Commemorating the Hundredth Episode, All Four Heavenly Kings Assemble!"; Transliteration: "Hyaku Kai Kinen de Shitennō Zenin dai Shūgō!" (Japanese: 百回記念で四天王全員大集合!) | April 14, 2013 |
Toriko, Coco, Sani, Zebra, and Komatsu compete to see who'll be the first to snag the ultra-rare delicacy known as Madam Fish! Winner gets the first bite!
| 101 | 2 | "Toriko Fainting in Agony?! Capture the World's Smelliest Ingredient!"; Transliteration: "Toriko Monzetsu!? Sekaiichi Kusai Shokuzai o Hokaku Seyo!" (Japanese: トリコ悶絶!? 世界一臭い食材を捕獲せよ!) | April 21, 2013 |
Toriko and Komatsu set off for the Heavy Drinker Archipelago to seek out the King Vinegar. Then they must go after the most foul-smelling ingredient on the planet, the Dodurian Bomb!
| 102 | 3 | "Too Huge! With Pro Wrestling Moves, the Completion of the Ehou Maki"; Transliteration: "Deka-sugi! Puroresu-waza de Kyodai Ehō-maki Kansei!!" (Japanese: デカすぎ! プロレス技で巨大恵方巻き完成!!) | April 28, 2013 |
Toriko and Komatsu visit an old friend who might be able to help them gather the seaweed they need to complete their epic Fortune Roll!
| 103 | 4 | "Hands Together and Bow! Gourmet Human National Treasure Chin Chinchin Appears!"; Transliteration: "Gasshōichirei! Bishoku Ningen Kokuhō Chinchinchin Tōjō!!" (Japanese: 合掌一礼! 美食人間国宝・珍鎮々登場!!) | May 5, 2013 |
Toriko and Komatsu try to eat their way to destiny by devouring Monchy's Fortune Roll, but they soon get distracted by a vanishing restaurant where they meet the Master of the legendary Chourin temple and one of the only 4 national Gourmet treasures Chin Chinchin!
| 104 | 5 | "Those Without Gratitude Should Not Enter! The Fearsome Shokurin Temple!"; Transliteration: "Kansha Naki Mono Hairubekarazu! Kyōfu no Shoku Hayashiji!!" (Japanese: 感謝なき者入るべからず! 恐怖の食林寺!!) | May 12, 2013 |
The legendary Chourin Temple holds the ingredient sought by Toriko and Komatsu, but the adventurous eaters might not be ready for the teachings of the temple's Master!
| 105 | 6 | "Toriko, Completely Defeated?! The Delicate and Uninhibited Power of Food Honor!"; Transliteration: "Toriko Kanzen Haiboku!? Sensai Katsu Gōkai, Shoku gi no Iryoku!!" (Japanese: トリコ完全敗北!? 繊細かつ豪快、食義の威力!!) | May 19, 2013 |
Toriko's quest to attain the elusive Bubble Fruit hits a snag when he must fight a surprisingly formidable foe. If the gourmet hunter wants to complete his quest, he must learn to honor the food!
| 106 | 7 | "It's All About Appreciation! The Essentials of Food Honor!"; Transliteration: "Kansha Aru Nomi! Shoku gi no Gokui!" (Japanese: 感謝あるのみ! 食義の極意!) | May 26, 2013 |
Before they can truly honor the food, Toriko and Komatsu must master the art of gratitude by completing a series of tasks that prove far more difficult than originally expected!
| 107 | 8 | "An Approaching Threat! Hurry, Toriko! The Road to the Bubble Fruits!"; Transliteration: "Semaru Kyōi! Isoge, Toriko! Shabonfurūtsu e no Michi" (Japanese: 迫る脅威! いそげ、トリコ! シャボンフルーツへの道) | June 2, 2013 |
Toriko and Komatsu have finished their training of Food Honor, thus they gain an enhancement in their abilities. Master Chin takes Toriko to the Bubble Way for his final challenge in order to reclaim the Bubble Fruit. Meanwhile at Shokurin Temple, Chiyo arrives in an undead beast with an intimidating aura to everyone's surprise.
| 108 | 9 | "Tradgedy! [sic?] The Demise of Shokurin Temple... Farewell Komatsu!"; Transliteration: "Sangeki! Shoku Hayashiji no Shūen... Saraba, Komatsu!!" (Japanese: 惨劇! 食林寺の終焉... さらば、小松!!) | June 9, 2013 |
Toriko pushes himself to the breaking point on his hunt for the Bubble Fruit, and a Bishokukai raiding party wreaks havoc at Chowlin Temple!
| 109 | 10 | "Mighty and Unrivaled! One Who Has Mastered Food Honor!"; Transliteration: "Gōrikimusō! Shokugi o Kiwameshimono!" (Japanese: 剛力無双! 食義を極めし者!) | June 16, 2013 |
Toriko uses his new technique – and the strength he gained by eating the Bubble Fruit – to easily destroy a giant green monster, but the Master of Chowlin Temple may not be so lucky!
| 110 | 11 | "National Treasure Class" One-Swing 100 Million Yen Techniques! Toriko VS Granny Chiyo"; Transliteration: "Kokuhō-kyū" Hitofuri Ichiokuen no Waza! Toriko VS Chiyo Baba!!" (Japanese: 国宝級"一振り一億円の技! トリコVS千代婆!!) | June 23, 2013 |
Toriko shows off an awesome array of powerful new techniques in his battle with Granny Chiyo, but the arrival of a mysterious and terrifying GT Robot puts their bout on hold!
| 111 | 12 | "Phantom Ingredient "CENTER", Ichiryuu's Strongest Biotope 0!"; Transliteration: "Maboroshi no Shokuzai "C " Ichiryū to Saikyō dai 0 Biotōpu" (Japanese: 幻の食材"C"一龍と最強第0ビオトープ) | June 30, 2013 |
An unexpected visitor uses a dangerous technique in an attempt to heal Master Chin-Chin, and the strongest warriors from the IGO gather for dinner – and to prepare for war!
| 112 | 13 | "The Legendary Bee "Infinity Bee", Toriko vs New Type GT Robo"; Transliteration: "Densetsu no Hachi "Infini bī" Toriko VS Shingata GT Robo" (Japanese: 伝説の蜂"インフィニ・ビー"トリコVS新型GTロボ) | July 7, 2013 |
Toriko and Komatsu are sent to search for Golden Wheat, but their mission is interrupted by the arrival of a terrifying and powerful new GT Robo!
| 113 | 14 | "Showing his True Strength! Komatsu's Food Honor The Actual Food! The Phantasmal Noodles, "Zenmen""; Transliteration: "Honryō Hakki! Komatsu no Shoku Yoshi Jitsu Shoku! Maboroshi no Men "Zen Men"" (Japanese: 本領発揮！小松の食義 実食！幻の麺"全麺") | July 14, 2013 |
Toriko shocks the GT Robo with his amazing strength, and Komatsu gets an assignment from Granny Setsu that will put his powers of Honoring the Food to the ultimate test!
| 114 | 15 | "The Four Heavenly Kings Gather! The Gourmet World Beasts the "Four Beast" Awaken!"; Transliteration: "Shitennō Shūketsu! Gurume Kai no Kaibutsu "Yon Juu" no Mezame!" (Japanese: 四天王集結！グルメ界の怪物"四獣"の目覚め！) | July 21, 2013 |
The Four Heavenly Kings share a mega meal together, Komatsu learns the secret to preparing Bubble Fruit, and the human world braces for the arrival of the Four-Beasts!
| 115 | 16 | "The Battle to Determine the Fate of Mankind! The Four Beasts VS The Four Heavenly Kings!"; Transliteration: "Jinrui no Sonbō o Kake ta Tatakai! Yon Shishi VS Shitennō !!" (Japanese: 人類の存亡をかけた戦い！四獣VS四天王!!) | July 28, 2013 |
Humanity watches in horror as the Four-Beasts easily destroy the military's strongest weapons, but all hope is not lost – the Heavenly Kings are about to join the fight!
| 116 | 17 | "Toriko, Coco, Sani, Zebra The Four Heavenly Kings' Storm of Attacks!!"; Transliteration: "Toriko, Koko, Sanī, Zebura Shitennō, Arashi no Mōkō !!" (Japanese: トリコ・ココ・サニー・ゼブラ 四天王、嵐の猛攻!!) | August 11, 2013 |
The Four Heavenly Kings use every attack in their arsenal to survive their battle with the Four-Beasts, but there's a surprise in store for our heroes that could prove fatal!
| 117 | 18 | "Toriko's New Crisis The Creeping Four Beast's Main Body!!"; Transliteration: "Toriko Arata Naru Kiki Shinobiyoru Yon Juu no Hontai !!" (Japanese: トリコ新たなる危機 忍び寄る四獣の本体!!) | August 18, 2013 |
Toriko, Coco, Sani, and Zebra appear to have the upper hand in their battle with the Four-Beasts, but the monster's main body is about to wreak havoc on civilization!
| 118 | 19 | "The Four Beast's Shocking Union and the Green Rain!!"; Transliteration: "Yon Shishi, Shōgeki no Gattai to Midori no Ame (Gurīnrein)!!" (Japanese: 四獣、衝撃の合体と緑の雨(グリーンレイン)!!) | August 25, 2013 |
While Toriko, Coco, Sani, and Zebra battle the monstrous Four-Beasts, Komatsu rushes to make an edible antidote to the toxic Green Rain that's drenching the city!
| 119 | 20 | "The Four Heavenly Kings' Worst Dilemma! Komatsu's Determination!"; Transliteration: "Shitennō Saidai no Kyūchi! Komatsu no Ketsui!" (Japanese: 四天王最大の窮地！小松の決意！) | September 1, 2013 |
The Four Kings' battle against the Four-Beasts proves tougher than expected, and Komatsu tries desperately to speed up the process of making medicinal mochi!
| 120 | 21 | "Save Mankind With Your Miraculous Food Luck!!"; Transliteration: "Kiseki no Shoku un de Jinrui o Sukue !!" (Japanese: 奇跡の食運で人類を救え!!) | September 8, 2013 |
Komatsu makes great progress in his quest to create a delicious remedy for the Green Rain, but the Four Kings find their attacks failing and their strength fading in their battle against the Four-Beasts!
| 121 | 22 | "Explode! Curiosity for Taste! The Four Heavenly Kings' Combination Technique!!"; Transliteration: "Sakuretsu! Ajihe no Kōkishin! Shitennou no Gattai Waza!!" (Japanese: 炸裂! 味への好奇心! 四天主合 体枝!!) | September 15, 2013 |
The Four Kings hover on the verge of death until they recall a powerful technique from their training days – turning appetite into punching power!
| 122 | 23 | "Ultimate Technique "Dinner of the Kings""; Transliteration: "Ōgi "Ōshoku Bansan"" (Japanese: 奥義 "王食晩餐") | September 22, 2013 |
Teppei tracks down a mysterious stranger who may be responsible for the rampaging beast, and the Four Kings look to end the battle with their ultimate technique.
| 123 | 24 | "The Forthcoming Festival The Wriggling "Dangerous Guys""; Transliteration: "Kitaru Beki Saiten Ugomeku "Yabai Yatsura"" (Japanese: 来るべき祭典 うごめく"ヤバイ奴ら") | September 29, 2013 |
Teppei tries to remember the events that left him seriously injured, and Komatsu is honored by an invitation to participate in a world famous cooking festival!
| 124 | 25 | "Toriko VS Gourmet World Monster "Monplant""; Transliteration: "Toriko VS Gurume-kai no Kaibutsu "Monpuran"" (Japanese: トリコVSグルメ界の怪物"モンプラン") | October 6, 2013 |
Toriko battles a Plant Beast from the Gourmet World, Komatsu worries about his performance in a famous cooking festival, and Coco gambles for information!
| 125 | 26 | "Toriko's New Technique "Nail Gun"!!"; Transliteration: "Toriko Shinwaza "Neiru Gan"!!" (Japanese: トリコ新技"ネイルガン"!!) | October 13, 2013 |
Toriko must come up with some new moves to defeat the Mon Plan, Komatsu worries about the upcoming cooking festival, and Zebra returns to the home of Mellow Cola!
| 126 | 27 | "Great Imminent Troubles!? Cooking Fest Opens!!"; Transliteration: "Dai Haran Hisshi!? Kukkingufesu Kaimaku!!" (Japanese: 大波乱必至!? クッキングフェス開幕!!) | October 20, 2013 |
Audiences applaud wildly as Komatsu and the Four Kings arrive at the legendary Cooking Fest, but somewhere deep in the darkness, a powerful evil prepares to attack!
| 127 | 28 | "Komatsu in Trouble!? Triathlon Cooking!"; Transliteration: "Komatsu Pin Chi!? Toraiasuron Kukkingu!" (Japanese: 小松ピンチ!? トライアスロンクッキング!) | October 27, 2013 |
Komatsu is intimidated by the competition at the cooking festival, but he's got even bigger things to worry about: a grueling test of strength known as Triathlon Cooking!
| 128 | 29 | "Cooking Legend, Meet Tengu Buranchi!!"; Transliteration: "Densetsu no Ryōrijin Tengu no Buranchi, Kenzan!!" (Japanese: 伝説の料理人 天狗のブランチ, 見参!!) | November 3, 2013 |
The chefs in the top ranks capture the high-quality ingredients. Elsewhere, Komatsu meets Buranchi. Amazed by his Food Luck he helps Komatsu take the remaining ingredients.
| 129 | 30 | "Sneaky! Stormy! Buranchi, Pulling Ahead!!"; Transliteration: "Do Hiretsu! Bakusō! Buranchi, Gobō Nuki!!" (Japanese: ド卑劣! 爆走! ブランチ, ごぼぅ抜き!!) | November 10, 2013 |
Giraffe Birds and Sand Hamsters make their presence felt, Komatsu catches a lift with Brunch, and Triathlon Cooking kicks into high gear!
| 130 | 31 | "Life or Death, Scale Death Cooking!!"; Transliteration: "Ikiru Ka Shinu Ka Tenbin Desu Kukkingu!!" (Japanese: 生きるか死ぬか天秤デスクッキング!!) | November 17, 2013 |
Komatsu must reach the next round of the Cooking Fest without the help of his special Melk knife, but advancing could send the little chef headed toward a fiery fate!
| 131 | 32 | "Who is the Strongest Combo? Entire Island Cooking!!"; Transliteration: "Saikyō Konbi Wa Dareda? Shima o Marugoto Kukkingu!!" (Japanese: 最強コンビはだれだ?島を丸ごとクッ キング!!) | November 24, 2013 |
Komatsu advances in the Cooking Fest, only to find out that his next challenge will be to cook an entire island! He recruits Toriko to help him out, but with the other Heavenly Kings cooking as well, the competition is anyone's game.
| 132 | 33 | "Outbreak of War! Bishokukai's Furious All-out Attack!!"; Transliteration: "Kaisen! Bishokukai Gekiretsu no Sōkōgeki!" (Japanese: 開戦! 美食會激烈の 総攻撃!) | December 1, 2013 |
Komatsu's preparations for the next round of the Cooking Fest are interrupted by an old friend. Meanwhile, Toriko and the rest of the Four Kings brace for the arrival of evil!
| 133 | 34 | "Protect Komatsu! Toriko vs. Starjun!!"; Transliteration: "Komatsu o mamore! Starjun tai toriko" (Japanese: 小松を守れ! トリコ対スタージュン) | December 8, 2013 |
When Komatsu's life is threatened, Coco, Zebra, and Sunny spring into action to defend the little chef, but the main attraction is a brutal showdown between Toriko and Starjun!
| 134 | 35 | "Wild Battle! Toriko's Strongest Attack!!"; Transliteration: "Yasei no Tatakai! Toriko, Saikyō Kōgeki!!" (Japanese: 野生の闘い! トリコ, 最強攻撃!!) | December 15, 2013 |
Toriko pulls no punches in his slugfest with Starjun, Rin wages her own unique brand of war, and an army of chefs give the Gourmet Corp. more than they bargained for!
| 135 | 36 | "Top Showdown! IGO vs. Bishokukai"; Transliteration: "Chōjō Kessen! IGO tai Bishokukai" (Japanese: 頂上決戦! IGO VS 美食會) | December 22, 2013 |
The epic battle at Cooking Stadium rages on as Toriko and Starjun continue to throw down. If Toriko's going to be triumphant, he's can't pull any knife-and-fork punches.
| 136 | 37 | "The Terrible Trump Card! The Gourmet World Monsters, the "Nitro""; Transliteration: "Saiaku no Kirifuda! Gurume-kai no Kaibutsu "Nitoro"" (Japanese: 最悪の切り札! グルメ界の怪物 "ニトロ") | January 5, 2014 |
The IGO's chances for victory take a serious hit when the Gourmet Corp. unleashes the horrifying monsters Nitro and the Scum Beasts!
| 137 | 38 | "Struggle to the Death! Coco vs. Grinpatch"; Transliteration: "Shitō! Koko VS Gurinpāchi" (Japanese: 死闘！ココVSグリンパーチ) | January 12, 2014 |
Thanks to Komatsu's super culinary skills, Coco and Toriko have the strength to carry on their battles with two of the Bishokukai's most powerful monsters!
| 138 | 39 | "Duel! Sunny vs. Tommyrod"; Transliteration: "Kettō! Sanī VS Tomīroddo" (Japanese: 決闘！サニーVSトミーロッド) | January 19, 2014 |
Sunny puts his heroic hair to the ultimate test in a bombastic battle with Tommyrod and his grotesque army of deadly insects!
| 139 | 40 | "The Moment of Conclusion! Sunny's Final Power!!"; Transliteration: "Ketchaku no Toki! Sani, Saigo no Chikara!!" (Japanese: 決着の時! サニ一, 最後の力!!) | January 26, 2014 |
Sunny's bloody battle with Tommyrod reaches its horrific end, and Brunch finds himself locked in an electrifying battle with an immortal warrior that cannot be destroyed!
| 140 | 41 | "Counterattack! Zebra Gets Moving!!"; Transliteration: "Gyakushū! Zebura Shidō!!" (Japanese: 逆襲！ゼブラ始動!!) | February 2, 2014 |
Zebra evens the odds by unleashing the furious power of his voice, Setsuno tangles with an old rival, and Komatsu is shocked to find Toriko on the losing end of a battle!
| 141 | 42 | "Toriko, Counterattack! Ultimate Routine!!"; Transliteration: "Toriko, Hangeki! Arutimetto Rūtīn!!" (Japanese: トリコ, 反撃! ｱﾙﾃｨﾒｯﾄﾙｰﾃｨｰﾝ!!) | February 9, 2014 |
Komatsu's heartbroken wailing helps revive a battered Toriko, who suddenly unleashes a devastating attack that harnesses the power of a great warrior's imagination!
| 142 | 43 | "History's Greatest Enemy! "Joa" Appears!!"; Transliteration: "Shijō Saidai no Teki! "Joa" Shutsugen!!" (Japanese: 史上最大の敵！"ジョア"出現!!) | February 16, 2014 |
Toriko's awesomely destructive battle with Starjun is interrupted by the arrival of Joa, an unbelievably deadly adversary who has the power to turn good into evil!
| 143 | 44 | "Shock! The True Identity of the Mastermind "Joa"!!"; Transliteration: "Kyōgaku! Kuromaku "Joa" no Shōtai!!" (Japanese: 驚愕！黒幕"ジョア"の正体!!) | February 23, 2014 |
After the legendary Knocking Master Jiro unmasks the terrifying evil before them, his life is endangered by his affection for Granny Setsuno! Will Toriko arrive in time to save them both!?
| 144 | 45 | "The Beginning of the End! Toriko vs. Joa!!"; Transliteration: "Owari no Hajimari! Toriko VS Joa!!" (Japanese: 終わりの始まり！トリコVSジョア!!) | March 2, 2014 |
Toriko and Starjun forge an unlikely alliance to save Komatsu from a deadly adversary, and a riveting flashback reveals the tragic story of Frohze the God Chef!
| 145 | 46 | "An Attack to Come Back from Hopelessness! The Four Heavenly Kings, the Ultimate Technique!!"; Transliteration: "Kishikaisei no Ichigeki! Shitennō, Kyūkyoku Waza!!" (Japanese: 起死回生の一撃！四天王、究極技!!) | March 16, 2014 |
While Teppei and Jiro go toe-to-toe, the Four Heavenly Kings fight together to survive their battle with Joa, and the evil masterminds behind NEO reveal their devious plan!
| 146 | 47 | "Reach him, Komatsu's Yells! Toriko Awakens!!"; Transliteration: "Todoke, Komatsu no Sakebi! Toriko Kakusei!!" (Japanese: 届け，小松の叫び！ トリコ覚醒!) | March 23, 2014 |
| 147 | 48 | "Toriko and Komatsu, Setting Out on a New Journey!!"; Transliteration: "Toriko to Komatsu, Arata na Tabi no Shuppatsu!!" (Japanese: トリコと小松 新たな旅の出発!!) | March 30, 2014 |

== Media release ==
=== Japanese ===
Happinet Pictures distributed the episodes in 25 volumes in DVD format across Japan.

Japanese (Region 2)
| Volume | Episodes | Release date |
|---|---|---|
| 1 | 1–2 (Note: Volume 1 of the Toriko Japanese DVD include an extended version of Episode 1 which is a crossover episode with One Piece. This extended episode version is a 45-minute episode thats combine Episode 1 of Toriko and Episode 492 of One Piece) | August 2, 2011 |
| 2 | 3–8 | September 2, 2011 |
| 3 | 9–14 | November 2, 2011 |
| 4 | 15–20 | December 2, 2011 |
| 5 | 21–26 | January 7, 2012 |
| 6 | 27–32 | March 2, 2012 |
| 7 | 33–38 | April 3, 2012 |
| 8 | 39–44 | May 2, 2012 |
| 9 | 45–50 | July 3, 2012 |
| 10 | 52–57 (Note: Volumes 10 and 17 of the Toriko Japanese DVD don't include Episodes 51 and 99 which are crossover episodes with One Piece.) | August 2, 2012 |
| 11 | 58–63 | September 4, 2012 |
| 12 | 64–69 | November 2, 2012 |
| 13 | 70–75 | December 4, 2012 |
| 14 | 76–81 | February 2, 2013 |
| 15 | 82–87 | March 2, 2013 |
| 16 | 88–93 | May 2, 2013 |
| 17 | 94–100 | June 4, 2013 |
| 18 | 101–106 | September 9, 2013 |
| 19 | 107–112 | October 2, 2013 |
| 20 | 113–118 | December 3, 2013 |
| 21 | 119–124 | January 7, 2014 |
| 22 | 125–130 | March 4, 2014 |
| 23 | 131–136 | April 2, 2014 |
| 24 | 137–142 | June 3, 2014 |
| 25 | 143–147 | July 2, 2014 |

=== English ===
In North America, Funimation released the first 50 episodes in four parts from January 22 to May 7, 2013; they were reissued in two collections from August 26 to November 4, 2014. In Australasia, Madman Entertainment released the episodes in three collections from May 22 to June 19, 2013.

Funimation Entertainment (Region 1)
| Volume | Episodes (Worldwide numbering) | Release date | Notes/Refs. |
|---|---|---|---|
| Part One | 1–13 | January 22, 2013 | |
| Part Two | 14–26 | February 5, 2013 | |
| Part Three | 27–38 | March 9, 2013 | |
| Part Four | 39–50 | May 7, 2013 | |
| Collection One | 1–26 | August 26, 2014 | |
| Collection Two | 27–50 | November 4, 2014 | |

Madman Entertainment (Region 4)
| Volume | Episodes (Worldwide numbering) | Release date | Notes/Refs. |
|---|---|---|---|
| Collection 01 | 1–13 | May 22, 2013 | |
| Collection 02 | 14–26 | June 19, 2013 | |
| Collection 03 | 27–50 | September 14, 2015 | |
