= Trade Expo Indonesia =

Annual trade fair in Indonesia

Trade Expo Indonesia (TEI)
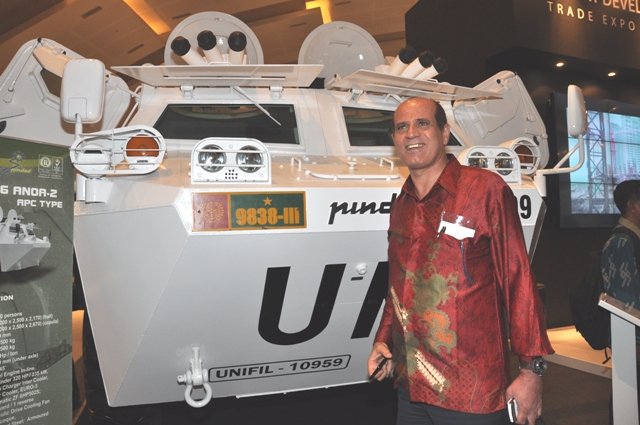
- A Pindad made armored vehicle at TEI
- Status: Active
- Genre: Trade fair
- Frequency: Annual
- Venue: Indonesia Convention Exhibition
- Country: Indonesia
- Years active: 1985–present
- Previous event: 24–29 October 2018
- Next event: 16–20 October 2019
- Participants: 125 countries
- Organiser: The Directorate General National Export Development (DGNED)
- Website: www.tradexpoindonesia.com

Trade Expo Indonesia (TEI) is an annual trade fair in Indonesia. It is the biggest trade, tourism and investment fair in Indonesia. The fair is held in the month of October. The fair was being held at JIExpo at Kemayoran in Jakarta for more than 30 years, but since 2017 the venue is shifted to ICE at BSD City within Greater Jakarta.

TEI is arranged in a goal to boost export of Indonesian products by increasing market access and diversification of export markets. Along with the exhibition, TEI also present a series of parallel activities encompassing trade, tourism and investment forum, business matching, business counseling, regional discussion, overseas and local trade mission, export Start-Up Competition and talk show.

== Chronology ==
- The 30th TEI event was attended by more than 14 thousand buyers from 118 countries, which was held at the Jakarta International Expo (JIExpo) from the 21–25 October 2015.
- 31st edition of TEI attracted 15,567 visitors from 125 nocountries, held during 12–16 October 2016 with US$1.1 billion in transactions.
- 32nd edition of TEI saw 27,711 participants from 117 countries, which was held 11–15 October 2017 with US$1.41 billion transaction.
- 33rd edition of TEI ran from October 24 to 28, 2018. It was participated by 28,000 visitors from 125 countries with a transaction value of US$8.45 billion which was five times more than the target.
- 34th TEI was held on October 16–20, 2019. It was participated by representatives and buyers from 36 countries, including Japan, Mexico, India, Serbia, Malaysia, Egypt, China, United Kingdom, and United States. There were 1,500 participating companies and about 38,500 visitors. The transactions value in TEI was worth about US $9.30 billion.
