= Anime Festival Asia =

Series of anime conventions

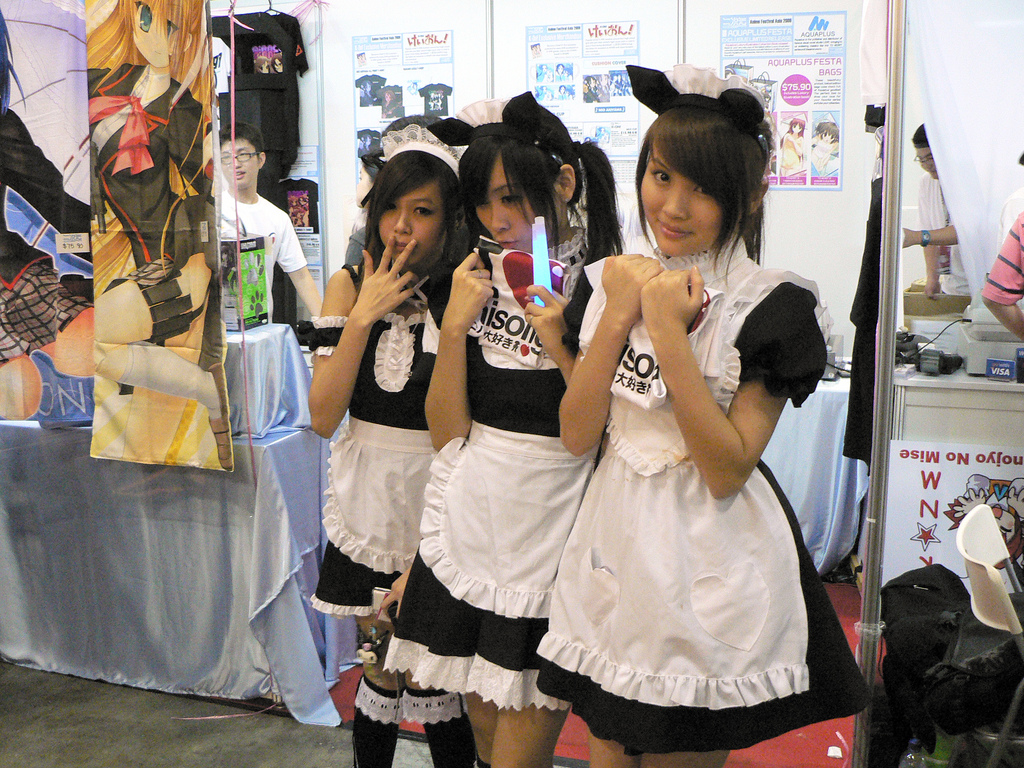
- Maid café at Anime Festival Asia 2009
- Status: Active
- Genre: Festivals
- Frequency: Annually (in each country)
- Country: Indonesia, Malaysia, Singapore, Thailand
- Inaugurated: 22 November 2008
- Most recent: 31 May 2026
- Website: animefestival.asia

C3AFA, also known as Anime Festival Asia (AFA), is a series of anime conventions held in the Southeast Asian region, with a core annual convention held in Singapore. The main convention is traditionally held over a weekend in late November to early December. It was held at the Suntec Singapore International Convention and Exhibition Centre from 2008 to 2011, but was moved to the Singapore Expo MAX Pavilion in 2012 due to renovation works at Suntec Convention Centre that year. The convention returned to Suntec Convention Centre in 2013 and is being held there till now.

Satellite conventions were also held at the Putra World Trade Centre, Kuala Lumpur, Malaysia; at the Jakarta International Expo, Kemayoran, Jakarta, Indonesia; at Queen Sirikit National Convention Center, Bangkok, Thailand; and at the Indonesia Convention Exhibition, Tangerang, Greater Jakarta, Indonesia.

Alongside the main conventions, AFA also holds periodic business conferences focusing on the anime and manga industry. The first of these was the Animation Asia Conference, held in 2009.

The attendees of AFA were 94,270 in 2016, 96,000 in 2017 and 105,000 in 2018. The total cumulative attendance from 2008 to 2018 is approximately 1,700,000.

The continued organisation of AFA and its flagship Japanese music concert I Love Anisong is managed by SOZO Pte Ltd. In 2017, SOZO entered a partnership with Sotsu—organizer of C3 events in Japan, Hong Kong, and China, forming C3AFA. In 2018, SOZO and Eliphant—the organizer of GameStart, a gaming and sports event in Singapore, formed a strategic alliance to bring more contents into the region.

== History ==
=== AFA History ===
Dates	Location	Attendance	Guests
22–23 November 2008	Suntec Singapore International Convention and Exhibition Centre; Singapore	29,000	Kunio Okawara, Kōji Morimoto, May'n, Ichirou Mizuki
21–22 November 2009	Suntec Singapore International Convention and Exhibition Centre; Singapore	52,000	Hatsune Miku, Ichirou Mizuki, May'n, Shoko Nakagawa, Yoshiki Fukuyama, Kaname, Danny Choo
12–14 November 2010	Suntec Singapore International Convention and Exhibition Centre; Singapore	71,000	Aira, Alodia Gosiengfiao, Kaname, Kana Hanazawa, Angela, Ichirou Mizuki, JAM Project, May'n, Scandal
11–13 November 2011	Suntec Singapore International Convention and Exhibition Centre; Singapore	82,000	Danny Choo, Hatsune Miku, Ichirou Mizuki, Flow, Lisa, Sea*a, May'n, Angela, Kalafina, Kanako Itō, Chiwa Saitō, Gō Nakanishi, Kaname, Suzuko Mimori, Sora Tokui, Mikoi Sasaki, Izumi Kitta, Usagi
9–10 June 2012	Putra World Trade Centre; Kuala Lumpur, Malaysia	40,000	Kalafina, Maon Kurosaki, Aimi, Flow, Kotoko, Sea*a, Mitsuhisa Ishikawa, Tomohiko Ishii, Danny Choo, Kaname, Tasha, Miyuko
1–2 September 2012	Jakarta International Expo; Jakarta, Indonesia	40,000	7!!, bless4, Ichiro Mizuki, LiSA, Angela, Kotoko, Sea*a, Stereopony, Danny Choo, Kaname, Akatsuki Tsubasa
9–11 November 2012	Singapore Expo MAX Pavilion; Singapore	83,000	Flow, fripSide, May'n, Sea*a, Sphere, T.M. Revolution, Shinichiro Watanabe, Go Nakanishi, Kaname, Singi, Danny Choo, Daisuke Kishio, Fumiaki Nishihara, Kenji Kamiyama, Hachioji-P, Akatsuki Tsukasa, Judy, Hiko, Mikoto, Reika
6–8 September 2013	Jakarta International Convention Center; Jakarta, Indonesia	53,000	Angelina, Angie, Aya Hirano, Babymetal, Clive, Danny Choo, Dempagumi.inc, DJ Kazu, Eir Aoi, Emi Nitta, fripSide, Kalafina, Kaname, May'n, Reika, Richfield, T.M.Revolution, Ying Tze
8–10 November 2013	Suntec Singapore International Convention and Exhibition Centre; Singapore	85,000	Danny Choo, Ryōhei Kimura, Ryōta Ōsaka, Nana Mizuki, May'n, T.M. Revolution, Lisa, Eir Aoi, Angela, Elisa, Gen Urobuchi, Koji Yamamoto, Shinichiro Kashiwada, Tomohiko Ito, Yui Ishikawa, Tetsurō Araki, Kyoji Asano, George Wada, Tetsuya Nakatake
15–17 August 2014	Jakarta International Convention Center; Jakarta, Indonesia	55,000	Atsuko Ishizuka, Danny Choo, Diasta Priswarini, DJ Kazu, Egoist, Eir Aoi, Garnidelia, Hachioji-P, JKT48, Luna Haruna, T.M. Revolution
5–7 December 2014	Suntec Singapore International Convention and Exhibition Centre; Singapore	90,000	angela, Eri Kitamura, DJ Kazu, Yui Horie, fripSide, Lisa, yanaginagi, niconico KUNIKAIGI
3 May 2015	Bangkok International Trade and Exhibition Centre; Bangkok, Thailand	75,000	angela, Angie, Baozi, DJ Kazu, Ei Aoki, Eir Aoi, Flow, fripSide, Hana, Inori Minase, Kalafina, Kaname, Kunio Okawara, May'n, Miu, Nao Shirahane, Nobuhiku Okamoto, Ono Manabu, Shizuku Kitayama, Siutao, Ying Tze, Yuiko Tatsumi
25–27 September 2015	Jakarta International Expo; Jakarta, Indonesia	60,558	Angie, Baozi & Hana, DJ Kazu, Ely, Flow, fripSide, Gackt, Garnidelia, Junko Takeuchi, Kaname, Liui, Lisa, Mai Fuchigami, Majiko, Michi, mikito-P, motsu × Kaya, Nano, Otogi Nekomu, Pink Babies, Pinky Lu Xun, Richfield, Shō Hayami, yanaginagi, Ying Tze, Yumiri Hanamori, Yurika Endō
27–29 November 2015	Suntec Singapore International Convention and Exhibition Centre; Singapore	90,669	Back-On, bless4, HoneyWorks, Zaq, Ayana Taketatsu, Maaya Uchida, Suzuko Mimori, Michi, Shiori Mikami, Yumiri Hanamori, Yurika Endō, Garnidelia, May'n, Mika Kobayashi, nano, Makoto Furukawa, Lia, Aimer, Stand Up! Hearts, Real Akiba Boyz
19–21 August 2016	Royal Paragon Hall, Siam Paragon; Bangkok, Thailand	55,000	GARNiDELiA, Luna Haruna, Suzuko Mimori, Aimer, Lia, livetune+, May'n, Aquors, Ayaka Fukuhara, Daisuke Hirakawa, Kenta Miyake, Machico, Mikako Izawa, Niji no Conquistador, Sawa Shiramori, Tasuku Hatanaka, Yoshiaki Hasegawa,
16–18 September 2016	Jakarta International Expo; Jakarta, Indonesia	61,953	Aimer, Alisa Takigawa, ELISA, livetune+, motsu X KAYA, bless4, Lia, Maaya Uchida, nano, 10JINACTOR, Atsumi Tanezaki, Chika Anzai, hitomi, Nozomi Furuki, Takaaki Suzuki, Tomomi Itano, Yōhei Azakami
25–27 November 2016	Suntec Singapore International Convention and Exhibition Centre; Singapore	94,270	HOME MADE KAZOKU, Kotoko, T.M.Revolution, JAM Project, Konomi Suzuki, Minori Chihara, Wake Up, Girls!, Aimer, Alisa Takigawa, Ami Wajima, HoneyWorks / CHiCO with HoneyWorks, Yoshitsugu Matsuoka, Nobuhiko Okamoto, Yōhei Azakami, Tomoyo Kurosawa, Pikotaro, Real Akiba Boyz, Mitsuhiro Ichiki, Matsushita, Kanae Ito, Kradness, Gen Urobuchi, Daiki Yamashita, May’n
10–11 June 2017	Royal Paragon Hall, Siam Paragon; Bangkok, Thailand	30,000	Chihiro Yonekura, May'n, Junichi Suwabe, Kanae Ito, Kengo Kawanishi, Reon Kurosaki, SpringChubit, Toru Furuya, Tomohisa Sako, Yasuaki Takumi, Yui Ishikawa, Yuuki Kuwahara
18–20 August 2017	Jakarta International Expo; Jakarta, Indonesia	50,080	fhána, Konomi Suzuki, May'n, Tomohisa Sako, KISIDAKYODAN AND THE AKEBOSIROCKETS, kradness, Luna Haruna, Shiena Nishizawa, CLEANERO, Kozue Aikawa, Rika Abe, Saki Ono, Satoshi Tsuruoka, Takaaki Natsushiro, Toru Furuya, Yasuaki Takumi, Enako
26–27 August 2017	Makuhari Messe; Chiba, Japan		
24–26 November 2017	Suntec Singapore International Convention and Exhibition Centre; Singapore	96,000	Nogizaka46, FLOW, Iris, Shiena Nishizawa, Tomohisa Sako, ClariS, Konomi Suzuki, Moso Calibration, nano, TRUE, fripside, Luce Twinkle Wink, Mashiro Ayano, May'n, Taketeru Sunamori, Tomotaka Misawa, Kohei Kawase, Yusuke Kobayashi, Go Takahashi, Yuuki Takada, Hibiku Yamamura, Narumi Kaho, Rika Abe, Kiyono Yasuno, Akiko Takase, Haruka Fujita, Minori Chihara, Yui Ishikawa, Tetsuya Kakihara, Toshiyuki Toyonaga, Seiji Mizushima, Shin-ichiro Miki, Kentaro Kumagai, DJ Keitan, Gear, Izumi Kitta, LeChat, real Akiba Boyz, Takahiro Baba, Enako
9–11 February 2018	Hong Kong Convention and Exhibition Centre; Hong Kong		
25–26 August 2018	Makuhari Messe; Chiba, Japan		
2 September 2018	Indonesia Convention Exhibition; Tangerang, Indonesia	57,528	EGOIST, Ammi Wajima, Band-Maid, Konomi Suzuki, Mashiro Ayano, Megumi Nakajima, TRUE, Ayasa, Eri Sasaki, Kizuna AI, Sora Tokui, Yukari Anzai, Jumpei & Morita, Jun Kasama, GinyuforcE, Lotus Juice, Siro,
2 December 2018	Suntec Singapore International Convention and Exhibition Centre; Singapore	105,000	angela, EARPHONES, Erii Yamazaki, GARNiDELiA, KISIDAKYODAN AND THE AKEBOSIROCKETS, Mili, May'n, nano, Real Akiba Boyz, Shiena Nishizawa, SPYAIR, Tielle&Gemie, Suzuko Mimori, TrySail, YURIKA, Ayasa
22–24 February 2019	Hong Kong Convention and Exhibition Center; Hong Kong		
24–24 August 2019	Makuhari Messe; Chiba, Japan		
1 December 2019	Suntec Singapore International Convention and Exhibition Centre; Singapore	120,000	Maaya Uchida, fhána, Scandal, TRUE, BLUE ENCOUNT, JUNNA, MYTH & ROID, ReoNa, Ayaka Ōhashi, Azusa Tadokoro, May'n, Minori Chihara
26 April 2020	Online		Ayaka Ōhashi, Azusa Tadokoro, bless4, BLUE ENCOUNT, Elisa, Eri Sasaki, Eriko Nakamura, EXiNA, Fhána, Hisanori Yoshida, JUNNA, Konomi Suzuki, Lotus Juice, Luna Haruna, May'n, Mika Kobayashi, Minori Chihara, nano, ORESAMA, Punipun, ReoNa, Rico Sasaki, Rithe, Sally Amaki, SCANDAL, Sora Tokui, TRUE, YURiKA
5–6 September 2020	Online		Chiaki Kobayashi, Chiharu Hokaze, Noriko Shitaya, Real Akiba Boyz, Sora Tokui, SymaG, Kiryu Coco, Dexter Tam, GANZO. HAYAKEN, Shogo Maeda, SHUNPI, WACAVA, Wan Hazmer
5–6 December 2020	Online		22/7, Aimu Sora, Amy Sakaguchi, Anly, Artgerm, Asaka, ASCA, Ayaka Ohashi, BLUE ENCOUNT, Burnout Syndromes, COALAMODE., DISH//, Eir Aoi, EXiNa, FLOW, Halca, JUNNA, KANAME☆, KISIDA KYODAN & THE AKEBOSI ROCKETS, KOEDA, Koji Saito, LiSA, Liyuu, Lozareena, May’n, Miki Saito, Moona Hoshinova, Nekota Ashu, ORESAMA, Pelican Fanclub, Rachta, ReoNa, Rithe, Ryokuoushoku Shakai, Seven Billion Dots, Shogo Yano, SPYAIR, SUKIMASWITCH, The Peggies, Toshiyuki Toyonaga, Yanaginagi, YOASOBI, Yui Ninomiya.
25–27 November 2022	Suntec Singapore International Convention and Exhibition Centre; Singapore	145,000	Shion Wakayama, Anya Melfissa, Charess, Ely, Gawr Gura, Hakken, Haruki Iwawa, JUNNA, May’n, Miyu Takagi, Moona Hoshinova, Mori Calliope, nanawoakari, NHOT BOT, Strawberry Prince, Thames Malerose, Tsunomaki Watame, Xiaoyukiko, Yuka Nagase
24–26 November 2023	Suntec Singapore International Convention and Exhibition Centre; Singapore	130,000	Iori Moe, Shigure Ui, Ai Kayano, Yumi Uchiyama, Sumire Uesaka, Sunsunsun, Kureiji Ollie, LAM, Soma Saito, Kengo Kawanishi, Manabu Otsuka, Yuichiro Hayashi, Mari Okada, Amane Shindo, Hina Aoki, Yuka Nishio, Aina Aiba, Thames Malerose, ASTERISM, Liyuu, May'n, NANO, Survive Said The Prophet, Tatsuya Kitani, Sakura Miko, Hoshimachi Suisei, Ayunda Risu, Moona Hoshinova, Pavolia Reine, Kobo Kanaeru, Mori Calliope, IRyS, Hakos Baelz, FLOW, ASCA, halca, spira spica, Nami Tamaki
3–5 May 2024	Jakarta International Convention Center; Jakarta, Indonesia		
29–30 November and 1 December 2024	Suntec Singapore International Convention and Exhibition Centre; Singapore		Saori Hayami, Taichi Ichikawa, Takeo Otsuka, Yurie Igoma, Rin Tateishi, Hina Aoki, Junya Enoki
28–30 November 2025	Suntec Singapore International Convention and Exhibition Centre; Singapore		Akari Kito, Aoi Yuki, Asami Seto, Atsumi Tanezaki, Chiaki Kobayashi, Kana Ichinose, Sayumi Suzushiro, Yusuke Kobayashi
30-31 May 2026	Queen Sirikit National Convention Center; Bangkok, Thailand		HIMEHINA, Shouta Aoi, SPYAIR, TeddyLoid, HoneyWorks / CHiCO with HoneyWorks, HaKoniwaLily, Takane no Nadeshiko, Karen na Ivory, KAMITSUBAKI STUDIO Virtual Singer, kz (livetune), ReoNa, Ayana Taketatsu, Kikunosuke Toya, mokumokuren, picco, SatapanP (Sata), SEIREI SHIMEI JOSHI, Shion Wakayama, Shun Nakanishi (Haze Glitch), SugarNote, NIJISANJI Units (BY THE BEAT, 3SKM), VII (Septem), Yasei Yoshida (Yoruyo), Yuma Uchida, Iori Moe, Thames Malerose

=== 2008 ===
First held at Suntec Convention Hall, Singapore. Managed to invite Kōji Morimoto, Animation Director of Studio 4 °C and Kunio Okawara, mechanical designer of Gundam for the industry talk. Ichirou Mizuki and May'n (her first overseas concert) were also present at the event.

=== 2009 ===
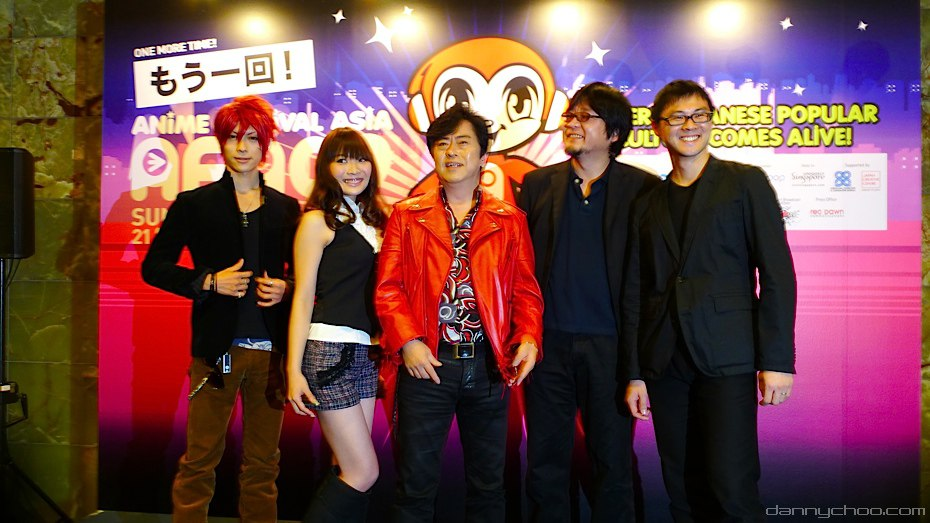
Anime personalities Kaname, May'n, Uchiro Mizuki, Mamoru Hosoda and photographer Danny Choo at the 2009 festival in Singapore

Managed to invite Danny Choo and Kaname to the event.

Created the maid cafe called "Moe Moe Kyun Maid Cafe."

Notable singers were Shoko Nakagawa who sang a duet with Ichrou Mizuki on Day 1 of the event and Yoshiki Fukuyama who sang a duet with May'n on Day 2 of the event. Hatsune Miku made her first "live" solo appearance overseas.

Held the first ever "Regional Cosplay Championship" where cosplayers from Singapore, Malaysia, Thailand, Indonesia and Philippines competed in teams of 2 against each other.

Invited 4 K-On! voice actors to the event and performed a first-ever live dubbing of certain scenes.

=== 2010 ===
Held on 12–14 November.

Aira and Alodia Gosiengfiao as well as Kaname were invited as cosplay judges.

Voice actors Kana Hanazawa and Milky Holmes were invited to the events.

A butler cafe called "Atelier Royale" was featured.

Invited singers included AKB48, Angela, Ichirou Mizuki, JAM Project. May'n and Scandal.

Movies Mobile Suit Gundam 00 the Movie: Awakening of the Trailblazer and The Disappearance of Haruhi Suzumiya were screened before their DVD or Blu-ray releases.

=== 2011 ===
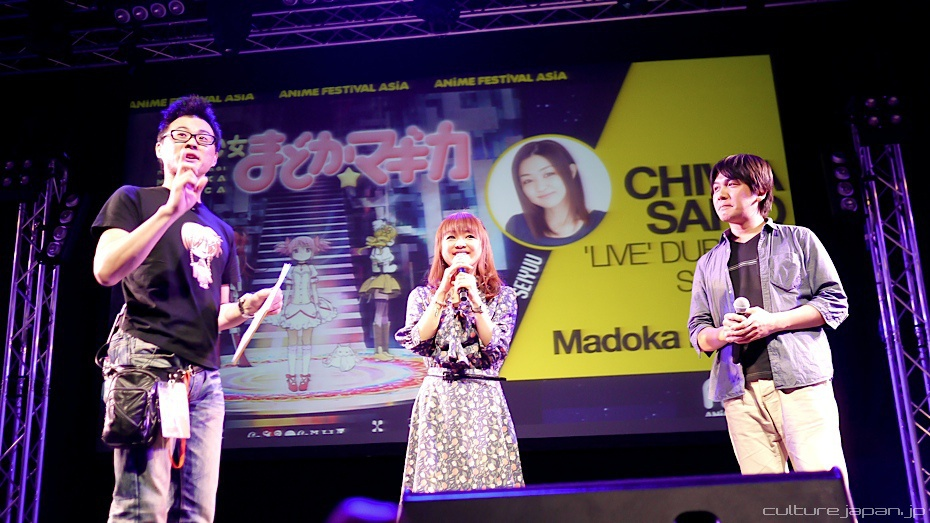
Chiwa Saitō (centre) on stage during the 2011 festival

Confirmed date of the event: 11 to 13 November.

Invited singers include Ichirou Mizuki, Flow, Lisa, and Sea*a on Day 2 of AFA. May'n, Angela, Kalafina, Kanako Itō and Milky Holmes on Day 3.

Hatsune Miku had her very own Live Party concert on Day 1 of the event, the first such concert to be featured in the region outside Japan.

Chiwa Saitō, Gō Nakanishi, Danny Choo, Kaname and Usagi are special guests for the event.

Mobile Suit Gundam Unicorn episode 4 will be shown on the same day as Japan.

=== 2012 ===
Separated into 3 events with the first event held at Malaysia in June, the second event held at Indonesia in September and the third event held at Singapore in November.

Danny Choo hosted the three events.

All 3 events also had a maid cafe and a butler cafe.

The event in Malaysia was held at Putra World Trade Centre, Kuala Lumpur from 9 to 10 June 2012.

Invited singers for the Anisong concert in Malaysia include Kalafina, Maon Kurosaki, and Aimi on Day 1, and Flow, Kotoko, and Sea*a on Day 2.

Mitsuhisa Ishikawa and Tomohiko Ishii from Production I.G, Danny Choo, Kaname, and Tasha with Miyuko from Korea were special guests for the event.

The second event was in Indonesia from 1 to 2 September 2012 and the venue was Jakarta International Expo.

Invited singers for the Anisong concert in Indonesia include Ichirou Mizuki, bless4, 7!!, and Lisa on Day 1, and Angela, Stereopony, Kotoko, and Sea*a on Day 2.

Singapore was the final event of 2012, held from 9 to 11 November 2012 with the venue as Singapore Expo.

Fumiaki Nishihara, Go Nakanishi, Kenji Kamiyama, Shinichiro Watanabe and Hachioji-P were special guests for the event.

Daisuke Kishio and Sphere were the invited voice actors for the event.

Kaname, Akatsuki Tsukasa, Judy, Hiko, Mikoto and Reika were the invited cosplayers while Clive and Richfield were the invited judges for the cosplay competition. Team Shikon from Japan and Lunar Asterisk from Indonesia presented a special cosplay performance during the event.

Invited singers for the Anisong concert in Singapore include T.M.Revolution on Day 1, Babymetal, Flow, fripSide, Lisa and Move on Day 2, and May'n, Minami Kuribayashi, Sea*a and Sphere on Day 3.

Road to Ninja: Naruto the Movie, Fairy Tail: The Phoenix Priestess and Puella Magi Madoka Magica were movies screened at the event.

=== 2013 ===
Held in Jakarta, Indonesia and Singapore. Theme song Origami sung by Valerie Tang (former member of Sea*a).

=== 2014 ===
Held in Jakarta, Indonesia and Singapore. fripSide was in Singapore for a second time since their last appearance at AFA 2012. The largest ever convention held to date in Singapore was in Suntec City Convention Hall covering the entire 4th floor. A new mascot, Seika, was introduced. For the first time, AFA set aside a dedicated space for the first niconico KUNIKAIGI to be held outside Japan. This featured popular niconico groups and artists like Amatsuki, Kashitaro Ito, Gero, ROOT FIVE, Hachioji P, Yuyoyuppe, DJ CAESAR, Kozue Aikawa, Miume, ARS MAGNA, and PCF. A total of 145,000 audience members attended.

=== 2015 ===
Held in Jakarta, Indonesia and Singapore. Held in Bangkok, Thailand for the first time.

For the first time, I Love Anisong collaborated with SMASH! Sydney Manga and Anime Show in Sydney, Australia to present a special one-night concert. This event was held on 8 August 2015 at Rosehill Gardens. Among the invited guests were Japanese music artists Garnidelia, DJ Hello Kitty, kz (livetune) and yanaginagi.

=== 2016 ===
Held in Jakarta, Indonesia; Singapore; and Thailand.

Enako was the first Japanese guest cosplayer at AFASG 2016. Iketeru Hearts, formerly known as Stand Up! Hearts, had their second appearance at AFA. Guest appearance of Pikotaro to perform his viral song PPAP.

=== 2017 ===
In 2017, the event was scheduled to be held at the revamped Suntec Singapore Convention & Exhibition Centre. SOZO (Organisers of Anime Festival Asia) and Sotsu (Organisers of C3 Events) announced a partnership to host this year's AFA in Thailand, Indonesia, Tokyo, Singapore and Hong Kong(2018). The event was henceforth known under the brand new network event platform C3AFA, and would cover key cities in the APAC region.

=== 2018 ===
In 2018, SOZO retained the C3AFA branding for the year. Only Indonesia and Singapore were confirmed as potential locations. AFA celebrated its 10th anniversary with a red carpet event in Singapore. 2018 also marked the last AFA in Indonesia until 2024.

=== 2019 ===
In 2019, C3AFA2019 was held in Hong Kong, Tokyo and Singapore. A special collaboration stage was held on the final day of AFASG where May'n and Minori Chihara performed a cover version of "Don't say lazy" from the anime K-on!. Ayaka Ōhashi and Azusa Tadokoro joined the aforementioned singers to perform a cover version of "Butterfly" from the anime Digimon. Around 120,000 attended the event.

=== 2020 ===
In 2020, due to the ongoing COVID-19 pandemic around the globe, AFA was held online for the very first time under the name AFA United by having an online concert streaming on 26 April 2020. Two more online events entitled AFA STATION 2020 was stream on 5–6 September and AFA Singapore 2020 Online on 5–6 December 2020.

=== 2021 ===
In 2021, AFA STATION was rebranded as a monthly online event under the name AFA STATION TV starting 6 March 2021. No major event was held on this year.

=== 2022 ===
First AFA to be held as a physical event in 3 years after the 2020 and 2021 edition were held online due to COVID-19 pandemic. Featured the first hololive Meet in AFA, the first ever night stage session dedicated to VTubers. The Anisong concert was reduced from three night sessions in three days as in previous AFAs to only one night session in one day. An attendance number of 145,000 was seen for this edition.

=== 2023 ===
AFA celebrated their 15th Anniversary. Attendee numbers were at 130,000.

=== 2024 ===
AFA was held in Indonesia from 3 to 5 May while it is held in Singapore on 29, 30 November and 1 December.

== Incidents ==
In 2013, a member of public called the police after encountering a cosplayer dressed up as Ryuko Matoi of Kill la Kill, showing her cleavage. Police was called to the festival and the incident was resolved amicably without any arrest.

In 2016, a vendor allegedly infringed copyrights of several artists by selling goods with their art cover on it without permission and approval from the original artist. The organizers promptly told the vendor to stop selling the affected goods on the following day.
