= Indonesia Fair =

Annual fair held in Indonesia

Indonesia Fair (Indonesian: Pekan Raya Indonesia, PRI) is a fair held annually. The goal of the fair is to promote the growth of the economy of Indonesia through the MICE industry (meeting, incentive, convention, and exhibition). The fair features exhibitions, trade promotions, shopping, music performances, various shows, amusement rides and a food festival. Pekan Raya Indonesia (old spelling Pekan Raja Indonesia), or Indonesia Fair, was held for three consecutive years between 1953 and 1955. Then after a long gap it is being held every year at ICE at BSD City, in Greater Jakarta, Indonesia since 2016. The fair is usually held in the month of September and October.

== History ==
The first Pekan Raya Indonesia was held between 29 August to 4 October 1953, officially known as "The First Indonesian International Trade & Industrial Fair". China was the main international exhibitor. It was held on the site where Atma Jaya University now stands, on what is then called Kebayoran Road (now Jalan Jendral Sudirman).

The second Pekan Raya Indonesia in 1954. The main international exhibitor was Soviet Union.

The third Pekan Raya Indonesia was held in 1955 and the United States was the main international exhibitor. Leading US companies such as Ford, General Motors, Caterpillar, Goodyear, RCA and Pan Am took part in the fair. Holiday on Ice was first introduced to Indonesia through the Pekan Raya Indonesia 1955, whose performance in Jakarta was attended by then First Lady of the United States, Eleanor Roosevelt. Among other notable features of the fair was the Stand Televisi ("television stand"), among the first introduction of a true color television to Indonesia.

In 2016, PRI was held with the concept of 1,000 bands, 1,000 culinary tastes of the archipelago heritage, and a variety of family games that last from October 20 to November 6, 2016.

The 2017 Indonesian Fair (PRI) was held from October 21 to November 5, 2017, with a concept of richer Indonesian culture, starting from musical concert, culture, culinary, shopping, to multi-scale exhibitions.

2018 Indonesia Fair was held from September 27 to October 7, participated by 600 tenants with more than 2,000 trademarks. Participants ranges from property, automotive, fashion, food and beverage, and electronics sectors as well as creative businesses and small and medium enterprises. International Indie Music Festival (IIMF) was arranged as part of the festival.

== See also ==
- Jakarta Fair

== Cited works ==
- Merrillees, Scott (2015). Jakarta: Portraits of a Capital 1950-1980. Jakarta: Equinox Publishing. ISBN 9786028397308.
