= Indonesia Convention Exhibition =

Convention and exhibition centre in Banten, Indonesia

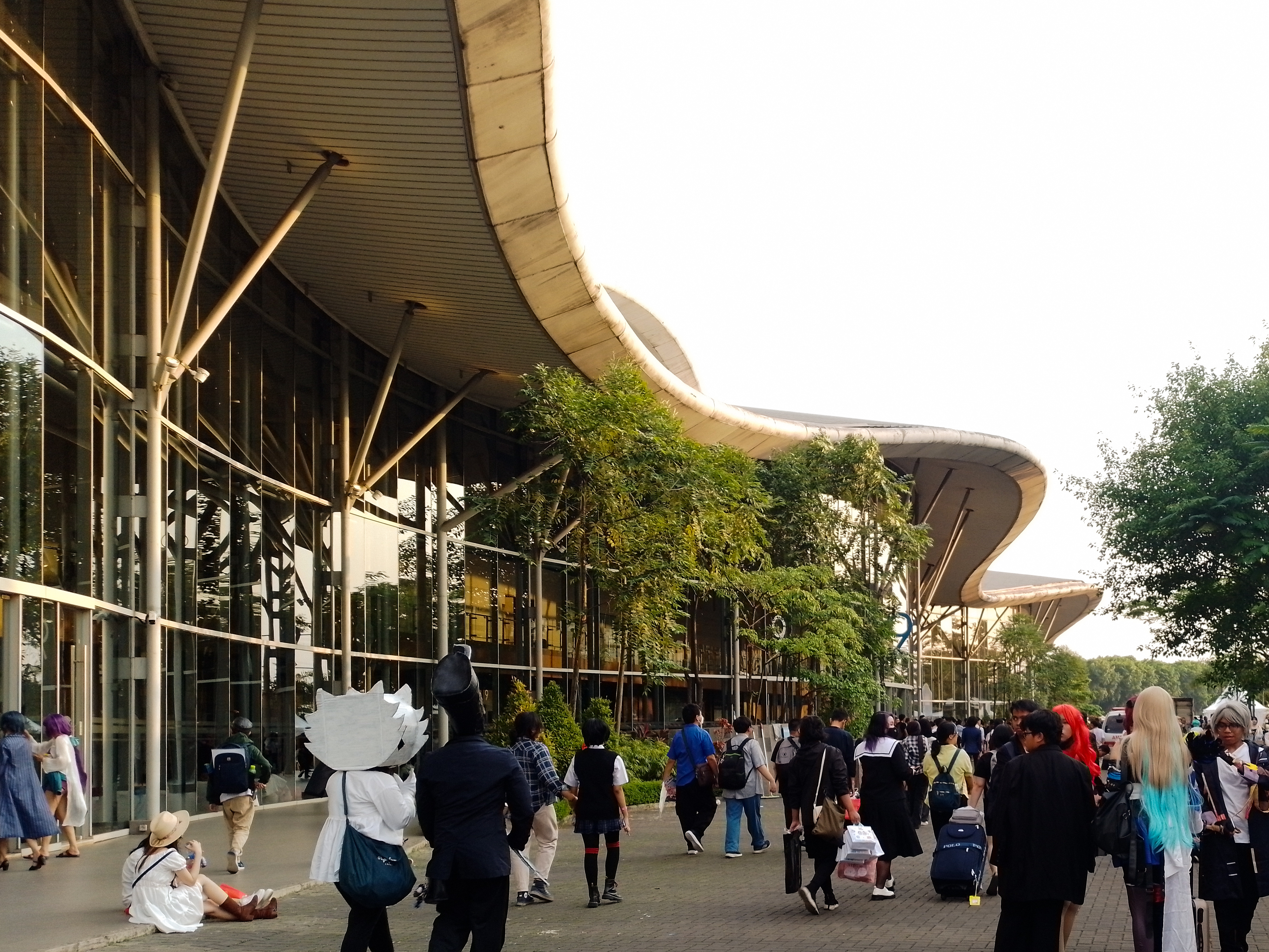
- Interactive map of Indonesia Convention Exhibition
- Location: BSD City, Banten, Indonesia
- Coordinates: 6.300258°S 106.636604°E
- Owner: PT. Indonesia International Expo (Kompas Gramedia and Sinar Mas Land)
- Operator: PT. Indonesia International Expo

Construction
- Built: 2010s
- Opened: 2015
- Architect: Cox Architecture

Website
- www.ice-indonesia.com

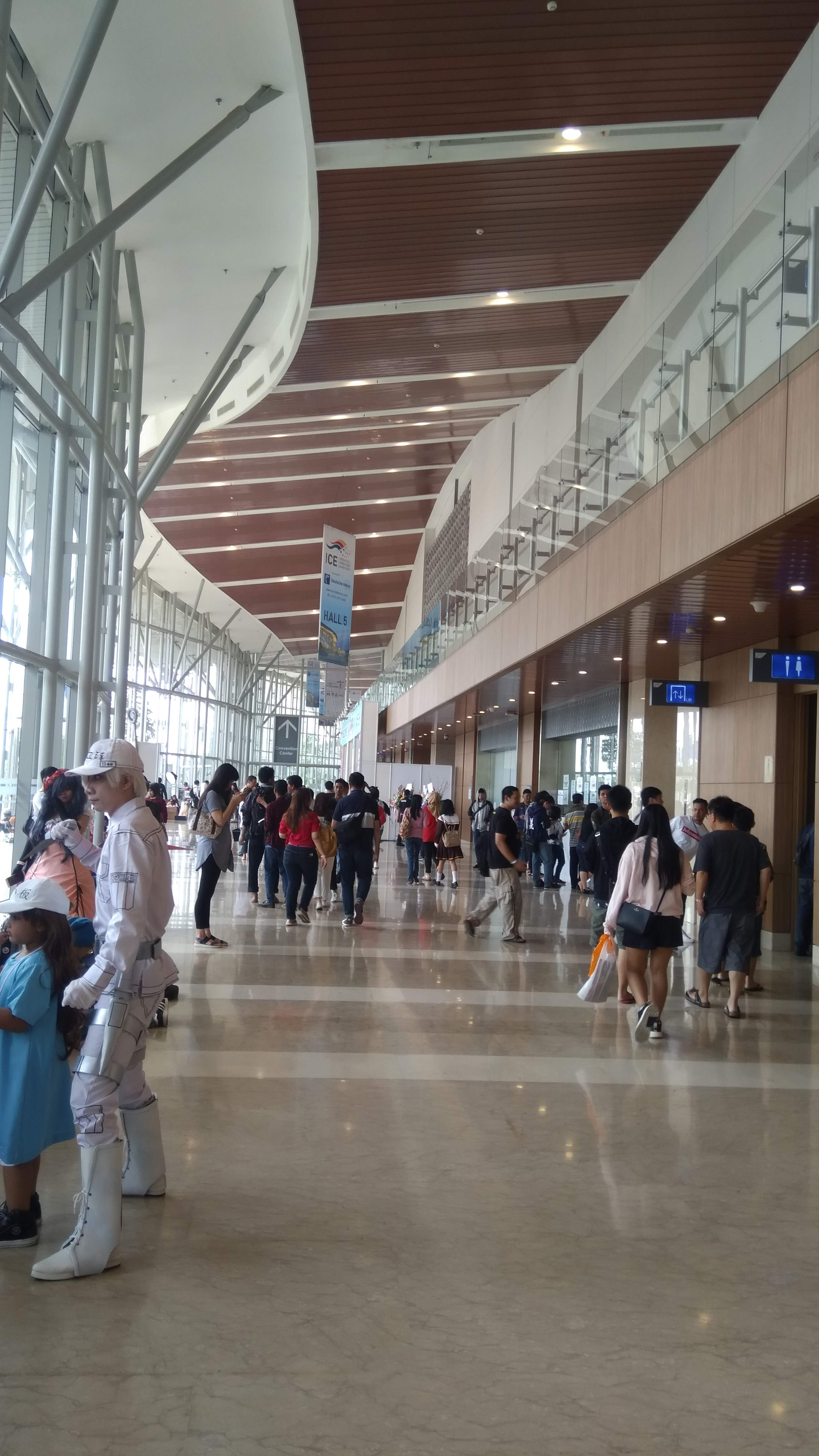
Interior of Indonesia Convention Exhibition

Indonesia Convention Exhibition (ICE) is a convention and exhibition centre located at BSD City, Banten, Indonesia. The convention and exhibition center was inaugurated on 4 August 2015. It is the biggest convention and exhibition center in Indonesia and Southeast Asia.

It has total land area of approximately 220,000 sqm, 10 exhibition halls with a total area of 50,000 sqm, 50,000 sqm outdoor exhibition space, 33 meeting rooms, one 4,000 sqm convention hall and one 12,000 sqm pre-function lobby. The halls are equipped to accommodate exhibitions, trade shows, conferences and other events. A four star hotel is located within the ICE complex to facilitate for accommodation for those joining different events at the venue.

== Entertainment events ==
Events from local artists
Events from Asian and regional artists
Events from international artists
Events from both local and international artists

Entertainment events at Indonesia Convention Exhibition
Date	Artist/Band	Tour / Concert name	Ref.
2015
29 January	Michael Bublé	To Be Loved Tour	
3 May	Super Junior	Super Show 6	
9 May	Katy Perry	Prismatic World Tour	
24 May	Demi Lovato; Karmin; Iwan Fals; Agnez Mo; Sheila on 7 Gigi; Nidji; Tulus; Kunto Aji; RAN; Stereo Casts	2nd Indonesian Choice Awards	
1 August	Big Bang	Made World Tour	
2016
2 January	Super Junior-K.R.Y.	Super Junior-K.R.Y. Asia Tour 2015: Phonograph	
27 February	Exo	Exo Planet #2 – The Exo'luxion	
5 March	5 Seconds of Summer	Sounds Live Feels Live World Tour	
16 April	Girls' Generation	Girls' Generation's Phantasia	
23 July	Selena Gomez	Revival Tour	
3 September	iKon	iKoncert 2016: Showtime Tour	
8 October	Taeyang; Nell; AKMU	Saranghaeyo Indonesia 2016	
10 December	Monsta X	The First Live "X-Clan Origins"	
2017
29 April	BTS	BTS Live Trilogy Episode III (Final Chapter): The Wings Tour	
15 July	CNBLUE	CNBLUE Live: Between Us	
3 September	G-Dragon	Act III: M.O.T.T.E World Tour	
23 September	Seventeen	Seventeen 1st World Tour "Diamond Edge"	
25 November	Dean; Lee Hi iKon; Eric Nam; Day6	Saranghaeyo Indonesia 2017	
2018
21 January	Wanna One	Wanna-One 1st Fanmeeting: Wanna Be Loved	
14 April	Katy Perry	Witness: The Tour	
30 June	Got7	Eyes On You	
15 July	Wanna One	One: The World	
25 August	Paramore	After Laughter Tour	
25 August	Twice	Twiceland Zone 2 – Fantasy Park	
16 September	Seventeen	Ideal Cut	
16 November	Charlie Puth	Voicenotes Tour	
2019
19 January	Blackpink	In Your Area World Tour	
20 January	Blackpink	In Your Area World Tour	
26 January	Stray Kids	Unveil Tour "I Am..."	
15 June	Super Junior	Super Show 7	
6 August	Westlife	The Twenty Tour	
7 August	Westlife	The Twenty Tour	
31 August	TVXQ	Circle Tour	
29 September	Momoland	Super Kpop Festival Indonesia 2019	
23 November	Exo	Exo Planet #5 – Exploration	
2020
11 January	Super Junior	Super Show 8: Infinite Time	
7 September	Billie Eilish	Where Do We Go? World Tour	
2022
17 September	Super Junior	Super Show 9: Road	
24 September	Seventeen	Be The Sun World Tour	
25 September	Seventeen	Be The Sun World Tour	
12 October	Tomorrow X Together	Act: Lovesick	
4 November	NCT 127	Neo City – The Link	
5 November	NCT 127	Neo City – The Link	
2023
5 February	Mamamoo	My Con World Tour	
9 February	Westlife	The Wild Dreams Tour	
4 March	NCT Dream	The Dream Show 2: In A Dream	
5 March	NCT Dream	The Dream Show 2: In A Dream	
6 March	NCT Dream	The Dream Show 2: In A Dream	
18 March	Treasure	Treasure Tour Hello	
19 March	Treasure	Treasure Tour Hello	
29 April	WayV	Phantom Fanmeeting	
20 May	Red Velvet	R to V	
25 May	Babymetal	Babymetal World Tour 2023	
26 May	Agust D	Suga Agust D Tour	
27 May	Agust D	Suga Agust D Tour	
28 May	Agust D	Suga Agust D Tour	
24 June	Aespa	Synk: Hyper Line	
22 July	Taeyeon	TAEYEON CONCERT - 'The ODD of LOVE'	
2024
24 February	Jonas Brothers	Five Albums. One Night. The World Tour	
27 April	IU	IU HEREH World Tour	
28 April	IU	IU HEREH World Tour	
1 June	Baekhyun	BAEKHYUN ASIA TOUR Lonsdaleite	
2 June	Baekhyun	BAEKHYUN ASIA TOUR Lonsdaleite	
15 June	David Foster; Josh Groban; Brian McKnight; Jessie J Katharine McPhee	HITMAN Returns: David Foster and Friends	
17 August	Enhypen	ENHYPEN WORLD TOUR “FATE PLUS”	
18 August	Enhypen	ENHYPEN WORLD TOUR “FATE PLUS”	
24 August	Ive	Show What I Have World Tour	
31 August	Riize	Riizing Day	
26 October	Zerobaseone	Timeless World	
2025
11 January	Aaron Kwok	Iconic World Tour	
14 June	Babymonster	Hello Monsters World Tour	
15 June	&Team	Awaken the Bloodline Asia Tour	
16 August	Baekhyun	Reverie World Tour	
31 August	Park Bo-gum	Fan Meeting Tour 'Be With You'	
13 September	Super Junior	Super Show 10	
2026
10 January	Riize	Riizing Loud	
31 January	Ateez	ATEEZ 2026 WORLD TOUR "IN YOUR FANTASY"	
4 April	Aespa	Synk: Aexis Line	
11 April	NCT Wish	NCT WISH 1st CONCERT TOUR ‘INTO THE WISH : Our WISH	
5 December	BoyNextDoor	Knock On Vol. 2	

== Notable events ==
Events	Date
Trade Expo Indonesia (TEI)	32nd TEI, 11–15 October 2017; 33rd TEI, 24–28 October 2018
C3-Anime Festival Asia Jakarta	31 August–2 September 2018
IndoBuildtech	25–29 May 2016; Part 1 2024: 12–16 June 2024; Part 2 2024: 7–11 August 2024
Indonesia International Auto Show	20–30 August 2015; 11–21 August 2016; 10–20 August 2017; 2–12 August 2018; 18–28 July 2019; 11–21 November 2021; 11–21 August 2022; 10–20 August 2023; 18–28 July 2024; 23 July–3 August 2025 30 July–9 August 2026
PATA Travel Mart	7-9 September 2016
Indonesia Fair	20 October–6 November 2016; 21 October–5 November 2017; 27 September–7 October 2018
Big Bad Wolf Books	30 April–8 May 2016; 21 April–2 May 2017; 29 March–9 April 2018
PUBG Mobile Club Open - Spring Split: SEA Championship	22–23 June 2019
Bubu Esports Tournament 2019	13–14 September 2019
CIMB NIAGA XTRA XPO Championship 2020	8–9 February 2020
Comic Frontier (Comifuro)	Comifuro15, 24–25 September 2022; Comifuro16, 6–7 May 2023; Comifuro17, 16–17 December 2023; Comifuro18, 11–12 May 2024; Comifuro19, 9–10 November 2024; CFXX, 24–25 May 2025; Comifuro 21, 15–16 November 2025; Comifuro 22, 16-17 May 2026; Comifuro 23, 31 October–1 November 2026
Indonesia Anime Con	15–16 June 2024

== Accessibility ==
This exhibition center is located approximately 10 minutes away from Serpong, Rawa Buntu, and Cisauk railway stations, which makes it easily accessible to commuters using Jakarta commuter railway system. Moreover, this convention center is accessible through the nearby Serpong–Balaraja Toll Road. This toll road directly connects ICE to some important places in both West Jakarta and South Jakarta.

== See also ==
- List of convention and exhibition centers
- List of largest buildings

Other convention center or concert venues in Greater Jakarta:

- Beach City International Stadium
- Gelora Bung Karno Stadium
- Indonesia Arena
- Istora Gelora Bung Karno
- Jakarta International Convention Center
- Jakarta International Expo
- Nusantara International Convention Exhibition
- The Kasablanka
