= The First Live "X-Clan Origins" =

2016 concert tour by Monsta X

- Continental tour by Monsta X
- Location: Asia
- Associated album: The Clan Pt. 1 Lost
- Start date: July 16, 2016
- End date: January 7, 2017

Monsta X concert chronology
- The First Live: X-Clan Origins (2016); Monsta X World Tour: Beautiful (2017)

The First Live "X-Clan Origins", also known as Monsta X The First Live: X-Clan Origins, is the first Asian concert tour by the South Korean boy group Monsta X. It started on July 16, two months after the release of their third extended play The Clan Pt. 1 Lost, kicking off in Seoul, and then visiting four more Asian countries including Philippines, Indonesia, Taiwan, and Thailand.

== Background ==
In June, Starship Entertainment announced that Monsta X will hold their first solo concert, to be held at the Blue Square Samsung Card Hall in Hannam-dong, Seoul for two days from July 16 to 17.

Monsta X's first stop was in Manila, Philippines on November 27 at the Skydome SM North EDSA.

Monsta X had their second stop in Jakarta, Indonesia at the Indonesia Convention Exhibition on December 10.

Monsta X held their third stop in Taipei, Taiwan at the Taipei International Convention Center on December 18. The group also attended the recording of Taiwan's popular programs such as Hello Hallyu!, 100% Entertainment, Total Entertainment, Idols of Asia, and KKBOX. After that, they confronted a press conference to gain some of the local attention of the press.

Monsta X's Bangkok, Thailand stop was supposed to be on November 12, but postponed on January 7, 2017. The postponement was because of the death of Thailand's King Bhumibol Adulyadej.

== Commercial performance ==
While Monsta X announced their first solo concert, all tickets were sold out within five minutes of opening, wherein all 2,500 tickets were sold out in advance reservations for official fan club members only.

Monsta X's first concert in Taipei, Taiwan also gathered 3,000 audiences.

== Setlist ==
INTRO VCR

1. "Trespass"
2. "Steal Your Heart"

MENT

3. "Broken Heart"
4. "Because of U"

MENT

5. "Ex Girl"
6. "White Sugar"

VCR

7. "Yessir" – Jooheon
8. "Who Am I" – I.M
9. "It's All Yours" – Jooheon and I.M

VCR

10. "One in a Million" of Ne-Yo – Shownu
11. "Hold On, We're Going Home" of Drake – Hyungwon
12. "Anyway" of Chris Brown – Shownu and Hyungwon
13. "Runaway Baby" of Bruno Mars – Kihyun

MENT

14. "Hieut"
15. "Spotlight"
16. "Interstellar"
17. "Instead of Saying Goodbye" of Rain – Wonho
18. "Only Yours" of Lyn and "I Really Like You" of Jewelry – Minhyuk

MENT

19. "Cheer Up" of Twice and "Dumb Dumb" of Red Velvet – Shownu, Kihyun, Hyungwon, and I.M

VCR

20. "Blue Moon"
21. "Perfect Girl"

MENT

22. "Honestly"

MENT

23. "Focus On Me"
24. "Hero"
25. "Rush" (Remix)

MENT

26. "All In"
27. "Gone Bad"

ENDING MENT

28. "Amen"

VCR

ENDING VCR

== Tour dates ==
List of concerts, showing date, city, country, venue and attendance
Date	City	Country	Venue	Attendance
July 16, 2016	Seoul	South Korea	Blue Square Samsung Card Hall	Undisclosed
July 17, 2016	Seoul	South Korea	Blue Square Samsung Card Hall	Undisclosed
November 27, 2016	Quezon City	Philippines	Skydome SM North EDSA	Undisclosed
December 10, 2016	Jakarta	Indonesia	Indonesia Convention Exhibition	Undisclosed
December 18, 2016	Taipei	Taiwan	Taipei International Convention Center	3,000
January 7, 2017	Bangkok	Thailand	Central Plaza Chaengwattana	Undisclosed
