= Beautiful World Tour (Monsta X) =

2017 concert tour by Monsta X

Monsta X World Tour: Beautiful
- World tour by Monsta X
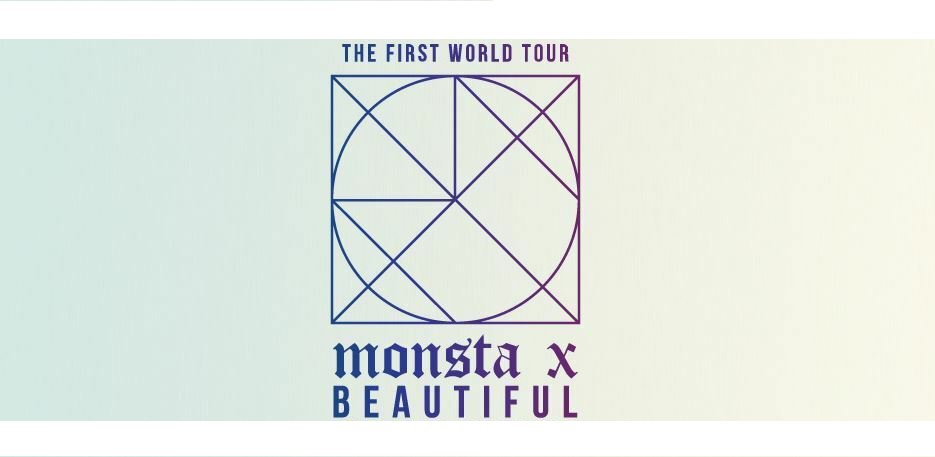
- Location: Asia; Europe; North America; South America
- Associated album: The Clan Pt. 2.5: The Final Chapter
- Start date: June 17, 2017
- End date: September 17, 2017
- Legs: 4
- No. of shows: 4 in Asia; 7 in North America; 2 in South America; 3 in Europe; 16 in Total

Monsta X concert chronology
- The First Live: X-Clan Origins (2016); Monsta X World Tour: Beautiful (2017); Monsta X World Tour: The Connect (2018)

Beautiful World Tour, also known as Monsta X World Tour: Beautiful, is the first worldwide concert tour by the South Korean boy group Monsta X following the group's sold out Asian concert tour The First Live: X-Clan Origins. The tour commenced on June 17, three months after the release of the group's first studio album The Clan Pt. 2.5: The Final Chapter, kicking off in Seoul, then visiting other ten countries including Hong Kong, United States, Thailand, France, Germany, Russia, Taiwan, Argentina, Chile, and Mexico.

== Background ==
=== Asia ===
On April 28, the group's official Twitter account revealed a poster for their first world tour, announcing that the first show would be held in Seoul. Their tour started on June 17 and June 18, at the Olympic Hall, located at Seoul Olympic Park. On May 18, the group's agency Starship Entertainment revealed that the tickets for the two Seoul concerts had been completely sold out, within a minute after going on sale, setting the record of "sold out tickets" for two consecutive years.

On July 7, Monsta X’s fan cafe updated with a message from Starship Entertainment that first included an apology to fans for having to convey bad news ahead of the world tour. According to their agency, a small wound and swelling was discovered on Hyungwon's knee, and following an examination, was diagnosed with the early stages of cellulitis. The agency also added that Hyungwon would be focusing on rest and treatment so that he can recover quickly.

The group was supposed to visit Indonesia for the tour, but their promoter SH Entertainment cancelled their performance due to "local circumstances".

=== Americas ===
Monsta X finished their tour in North America on July 23 and 24 at The Novo in Los Angeles. According to Starship Entertainment, the tour was attended by total of 20,000 fans in New York, Atlanta, Dallas, San Francisco, and Los Angeles. The group's agency also added that the six concerts in the five cities were completely sold out, including the belatedly added Monday concert in Los Angeles, while having Mexico on September 17 as the last stop for this tour. The group also had some interviews from well-known media platforms, such as Billboard and IHeartRadio.

The group finished their tour in South America, performing in Argentina at Estadio Luna Park on September 12 and in Chile at Movistar Arena on September 14.

=== Europe ===
Monsta X had three stops for the tour in Europe, Paris on August 9, Berlin on August 11, and Moscow on August 13.

== Setlist ==
1. "Beautiful"
2. "Incomparable"
3. "Hero"

MENT

4. "I Need U"^{[a]}
5. "All I Do"^{[a]}
6. "Ex Girl"
7. "White Love"

MENT

8. "Ready or Not"
9. "Oi"

VCR

10. "From Zero" – Wonho and Hyungwon
11. "Beautiful" (Remix) – Hyungwon (as DJ H.One)
12. "Bam!Bam!Bam!" – Jooheon and Hyungwon (as DJ H.One)
13. "24K Magic" – Shownu, Minhyuk, and I.M
14. "Mirror" – Kihyun and Jooheon

MENT

15. "Honestly"
16. "Roller Coaster"^{[a]}
17. "I'll Be There"
18. "White Sugar"^{[a]}

VCR

19. "Sweetheart"^{[b]}
20. "Stuck"^{[a]}
21. "Be Quiet"

MENT

22. "Broken Heart"
23. "Blind"

MENT

24. "Shine Forever"

MENT

25. "All In"
26. "Trespass"
27. "Rush" (Remix)

MENT

28. "Fighter"

ENCORE

29. "No Exit"

ENDING MENT

30. "5:14 (Last Page)"

Notes:

- ^{^[a]} included in the Seoul setlist only
- ^{^[b]} included in the International setlist only

== Tour dates ==
List of concerts, showing date, city, country, venue and attendance
Date	City	Country	Venue	Attendance
Asia
June 17, 2017	Seoul	South Korea	Olympic Hall	7,000
June 18, 2017	Seoul	South Korea	Olympic Hall	7,000
July 8, 2017	Hong Kong	China	AsiaWorld–Expo Hall 10	Undisclosed
North America
July 12, 2017	Chicago	United States	Rosemont Theater	20,000
July 14, 2017	New York	United States	PlayStation Theater	20,000
July 16, 2017	Atlanta	United States	Cobb Energy Performing Arts Centre	20,000
July 19, 2017	Dallas	United States	Verizon Theater	20,000
July 21, 2017	San Francisco	United States	Warfield Theatre	20,000
July 23, 2017	Los Angeles	United States	The Novo	20,000
July 24, 2017	Los Angeles	United States	The Novo	20,000
Asia
July 29, 2017	Bangkok	Thailand	Thunder Dome	Undisclosed
Europe
August 9, 2017	Paris	France	L'Olympia Bruno Coquatrix	Undisclosed
August 11, 2017	Berlin	Germany	Tempodrom	Undisclosed
August 13, 2017	Moscow	Russia	Stadium Live Club	Undisclosed
Asia
September 8, 2017	Taipei	Taiwan	Taipei International Convention Center	Undisclosed
South America
September 12, 2017	Buenos Aires	Argentina	Estadio Luna Park	Undisclosed
September 14, 2017	Santiago	Chile	Movistar Arena	Undisclosed
North America
September 17, 2017	Monterrey	Mexico	Auditorio BlackBerry	Undisclosed

=== Boxscore ===
Venue	City	Tickets sold / Available	Gross revenue
PlayStation Theater	New York City, United States	2,124 / 2,150	$226,298

== Awards and nominations ==
Award ceremony	Year	Category	Recipient	Result	Ref.
Mnet Asian Music Awards	2017	Best Concert Performer	Monsta X	Won	
