= Sea A =

Idol group

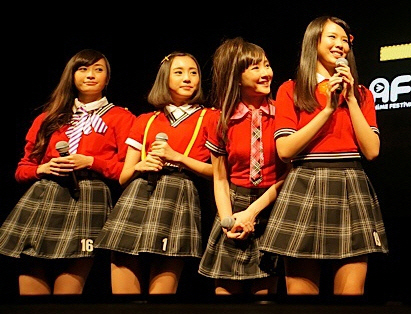
Sea☆A at Anime Festival Asia 2012

Sea A (stylized as Sea☆A or Sea*A) was a Singaporean-Malaysian J-pop idol group under the label Lantis Records and managing agency Horipro. The group consists of four members: Beryl, Valerie, Wynnie, and Estelle. They were formed in 2011 and released four singles and one mini-album. Their first album was released in 2013. The four girls were picked by Anisong Diva May'n's manager from Moe Moe Kyun Maid Cafe at the annual Anime Festival Asia (AFA) held in Singapore. Sea*A is also one of SOZO's platforms.

After their debut in 2011, Sea*A was invited to perform at the prestigious Animax Musix held annually in Japan at the Yokohama Arena. Sea*A had their own program on Japan-exclusive Animax Studio Musix called "Sea*A's Choice", where they introduced their favorite anime.

In 2012, Sea*A conducted a South-East Asian regional audition for new members. However, there was no new member selected in the end as the agency concluded that there were "no appropriate candidates with sufficient ability to fulfill [their] objectives of the audition".

On 1 July 2013, it was announced on their official website that Sea*A had officially disbanded. They also announced that Valerie would continue her activities as a solo artist.

In addition, Sea*A's Valerie was also the host and co-producer of AFA Channel's WOW JAPAN.

== Origins of group name ==
The group was originally named Sea☆A, which stands for South East Asia ☆ Anime. The star represents for the rising stars they aspire to become. Their name was later changed to Sea*A.

== Members ==
Beryl Teo (Berylベリル ) holds the leadership position in Sea*A. Her number, "16" is the sum of all of her family's birth months.

Valerie Tang (Valerieヴァレリー) Her number, "1", stands for "one for all, all for one" and "one heart; one dream; one passionate Sea*A". Valerie is the only one who has a solo in their second single Deli-Deli-Delicious, called Renai Circulation, a cover from the anime Bakemonogatari.

Wynnie Teoh (Wynnieウイニー) is the most fluent in Japanese out of the four members. Before she was in Sea*A, Wynnie was already famous as a model, actress and cosplayer (Sakana Sashimi). She was featured in OTACOOL2 and recognised by Danny Choo.

Estelle Lim (Estelleエステル) was the lead vocalist for Singapore's first J-pop girl group MYnT (Miyake, Yoshimi and Tomomi) before it quietly disbanded in 2010. Her number is 19.

== Discography ==
=== Albums ===
- Sea*A (2013)

=== Mini-albums ===
- WE ARE DREAM SHOOTERS!! (2012)

=== Singles ===
- DREAM SHOOTER (2011)
- DELI-DELI☆DELICIOUS (2011)
- Friendship Birthday ~Arashi No Yoru Ni~ (2012)
- エントリー！Entry! (2012)

== Notable anime ==
- Cardfight!! Vanguard (Ending)
- Toriko (Ending)
- Arashi No Yoru Ni (One Stormy Night) (Opening)
- Cardfight!! Vanguard Asia Circuit Hen (Ending)

== Concerts and public appearances ==
=== Concerts ===
- 12 November 2011 Anime Festival Asia Singapore 2011- Rock Your Soul Day 2 (DREAM SHOOTER was used as theme song as well)
- 23 November 2011 ANIMAX MUSIX Fall 2011
- 10 June 2012 Anime Festival Asia Malaysia 2012- Super Anisong Genki Live Day 2
- 2 September 2012 Anime Festival Asia Indonesia 2012- Super Anisong Stage Day 2
- 4 November 2012 ANIMAX MUSIX Taiwan 2012
- 11 November 2012 Anime Festival Asia Singapore 2012- Electric Groove Diamond Stage (エントリー！was used as theme song as well)

=== Public appearances ===
- May’n Asia Tour 2011: United! (Opening Act)
- 30 September 2012 Bushiroad Cardfight!! Vanguard Media Event in Singapore
- 4 March 2012 Bushiroad Cardfight!! Vanguard Festival in Singapore at Suntec City
- 29 May 2012 Trade Event (Animax Asia with Sony Entertainment Television Asia) at Hilton Kuala Lumpur Hotel Malaysia
- 31 May 2012 Trade Event (Animax Asia with Sony Entertainment Television Asia) at Hotel Pullman Jakarta Central Park
- 15 November 2012 4th Single エントリー！Release event at Tokyo Dome City Laqua Garden Stage

== Milestones ==
- First Singaporean-Malaysian J-pop/Anisong girl group
- First Non-Japanese group to perform at Anime Festival Asia
- First Anisong Idol group to release a single in different languages (Friendship Birthday~Arashi No Yoru Ni~) Jap/Eng/Chi
- First Singaporean-Malaysia Anisong Idol group to perform at the prestigious ANIMAX MUSIX
