= Super Kabuki II: One Piece =

Japanese kabuki play

- Original language: Japanese

Premiere
- Date: 2015
- Place: Japan

Super Kabuki II: One Piece is a Japanese kabuki play based on the popular manga One Piece featuring its protagonist, pirate captain Monkey D. Luffy, who is on a quest to become the pirate king together with his crew. The play premiered in 2015 and was very successful.

== Production ==
In December 2014, a kabuki adaptation of One Piece was announced; after watching another kabuki production and meeting with Ennosuke Ichikawa, mangaka Eiichiro Oda was impressed and said he could trust Ichikawa with the adaptation. It was produced by Shueisha and Shochiku, with Oda supervising. On July 28, 2015, the cast and basic plot were announced. The theme song was performed by Yujin Kitagawa of YUZU, who was close friends with Ichikawa. Still images of the actors in makeup were released in late September.

The original production ran from October 7 to November 25, 2015, at the Shinbashi Enbujō in Tokyo's Ginza District. To appeal to both new and existing kabuki audiences alike, the dialogue was performed in modern Japanese, but traditional techniques were used for keren special effects, including chūnori and honmizu. Tickets for the Tokyo show went on sale starting on August 20, 2015; in total, 100,000 tickets were sold. Following the Tokyo run, additional productions were held in 2016: at Shōchiku-za in Osaka from March 1 to 25, and at Hakata-za in Fukuoka from April 2 to 26.

In early 2017, Shonen Jump confirmed the play would be staged again that year by releasing a colored print featuring Luffy in a samurai kabuki outfit. The play returned to the Tokyo Shinbashi Enbujō starting that October 6, but star Ennosuke Ichikawa broke his arm during the curtain call of a mid-day October performance and was replaced by Ukon Onoe. The second Tokyo show ended on November 25, 2017. In 2018, it was staged again at Shōchiku-za in Osaka (April 1–25) and then at Misono-za in Nagoya (May 3–27).

== Cast ==
Typically in kabuki productions, one actor may play multiple roles; Ennosuke Ichikawa played three characters.

- Ennosuke Ichikawa – Monkey D. Luffy, Shanks, Boa Hancock
- Ukon Ichikawa – Whitebeard
- Minosuke Bando – Roronoa Zoro, Bon Clay, Squardo
- Hayato Nakamura – Vinsmoke Sanji, Inazuma
- Shun'en Ichikawa – Nami, Boa Sandersonia
- Seiji Fukushi – Portgas D. Ace
- Noritoshi Kashima – Brook, Sakazuki "Akainu"
- Kazuyuki Asano – Silvers Rayleigh, Emporio Ivankov, Sengoku
- Kôtarô Ichikawa – Hatchan, Sentomaru
- Juen Ichikawa – Avalo Pizarro
- Emisaburô Ichikawa – Elder Nyon
- En'ya Ichikawa – Jimbei, Blackbeard
- Emiya Ichikawa – Nico Robin, Marigold
- Omezô Ichikawa – Magellan
- Monnosuke Ichikawa – Tsuru

== Plot ==
The play is an adaptation of the Paramount War saga, (Note: The Paramount War saga, also translated as the Summit War, spans manga chapters 490 through 597 (collected in volumes 50 through 61), adapted in the animated series in seasons 11 through 14 (episodes 385 through 516).) which depicts the battle between one of the Four Pirate Emperors, Edward Newgate (Whitebeard), joined by Luffy, against the World Government's Navy, supported by the Seven Warlords of the Sea. The Navy is attempting to execute Portgas D. Ace, Luffy's sworn brother, who is serving Whitebeard as his second unit commander and adopted son. It follows primarily Luffy's story, set in the Sabaody Archipelago, Amazon Lily, the prison Impel Down, and Navy Headquarters at Marineford.

Following a battle with the Navy on Sabaody Archipelago, the Straw Hat Pirates are scattered by Warlord "Tyrant" Bartholomew Kuma; Luffy ends up on the all-woman island Amazon Lily. Hearing that his brother Ace is scheduled to be executed, Luffy breaks into the high-security Navy prison Impel Down to rescue Ace with the help of Warlord Boa Hancock, allying himself with new and former friends and enemies, freed in the chaos caused by Luffy's break-in. However, Ace has already been taken on a ship to Marineford, Navy headquarters, by the time Luffy reaches the most secure area of Impel Down, where Ace was being held. Luffy chases the Navy and Ace back to Marineford, where he joins Whitebeard, who has arrived to free his adopted son Ace. Although Luffy succeeds in freeing Ace briefly, it comes at a terrible cost: Whitebeard is killed and his forces are scattered, and Ace dies while protecting Luffy.

== Film edition ==
Live productions of the kabuki play were recorded and a trailer for the resulting "Cinema Kabuki" film was released in September 2016, followed by the premiere on October 22.

The film also was presented by the Japan Foundation as a one-day release with free admission at Grauman's Chinese Theatre in Hollywood, California, on November 27, 2016.
