= Kinoshi =

Kinoshi is a surname. Notable people with this surname include:

== Japanese people ==
- Katsuhito Kinoshi (born 1964), Japanese professional football manager
- Masahiko Kinoshi (1939–2023), stage name Ichikawa En'ō II, Japanese kabuki actor
- Takahiko Kinoshi (born 1975), stage name Ichikawa Ennosuke IV, Japanese kabuki, film, and television actor and stage director

== Other people ==
- Cassie Kinoshi, British musician
