= Sanae Takasugi =

Japanese film and television actress (1918–1995)

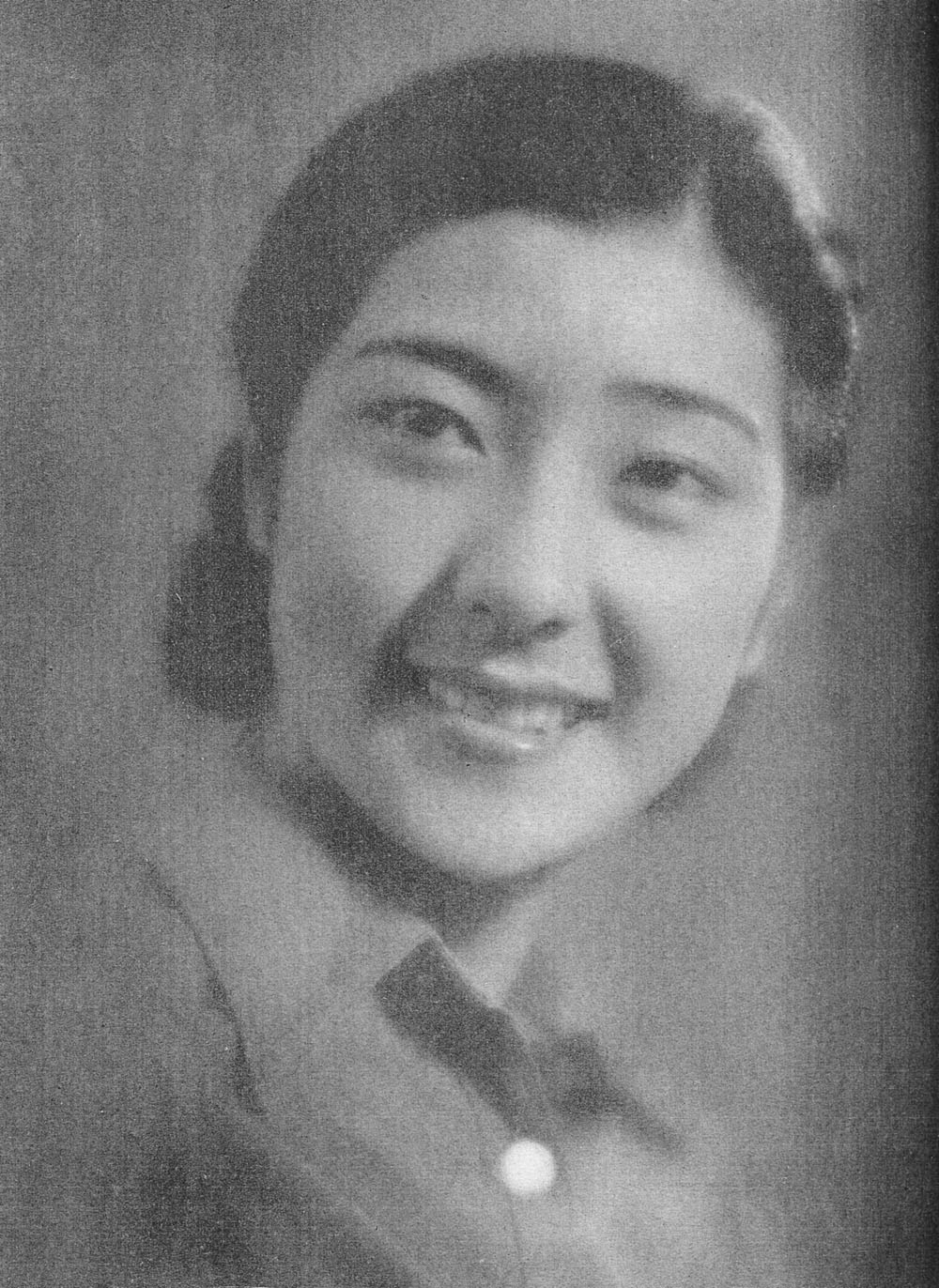
- Sanae Takasugi in 1937
- Born: Hiroko Shimizu; 8 October 1918; Asakusa, Tokyo, Japan
- Died: 26 November 1995 (aged 77)
- Occupation: Actress
- Years active: 1934–1979
- Spouse(s): Ichikawa Danshirō III (1938–1958)

Sanae Takasugi (高杉 早苗, Takasugi Sanae; 8 October 1918 – 26 November 1995) was a Japanese film and television actress. She starred in over 80 films, directed by notable filmmakers like Kenji Mizoguchi, Yasujirō Ozu, Mikio Naruse, and Keisuke Kinoshita.

== Career ==
Born in Asakusa, Tokyo, Takasugi graduated at Rissho High School and first performed in a dance hall, before joining the Shochiku film studios in 1934. She made her screen debut the same year in Yasujirō Shimazu's Our Neighbor, Miss Yae, and had her first starring role in Kōjirō Sasaki's Yama no yūyake. She married kabuki actor Ichikawa Danshirō III in 1938, and retired from acting until her return in 1948 in Kenji Mizoguchi's Women of the Night. After her husband's death in 1958, she retired once more before returning to the screen again in the late 1960s, appearing in small roles in films by Kaneto Shindō and Keisuke Kinoshita, and on television. She received a Golden Glory Award at the Japanese Movie Critics Awards in 1994 and died the following year at the age of 77.

She mothered three children: the kabuki actors Ichikawa Ennosuke III and Ichikawa Danshirō IV, and actress Yasuko Ichikawa. She is the grandmother of actors Ichikawa Ennosuke IV and Teruyuki Kagawa.

== Selected filmography ==
=== Film ===
- Our Neighbor, Miss Yae (Yasujirō Shimazu, 1934)
- Yama no yūyake (Kōjirō Sasaki, 1934)
- Kazoku kaigi (Yasujirō Shimazu, 1936)
- Women of the Night (Kenji Mizoguchi, 1948)
- The Munekata Sisters (Yasujirō Ozu, 1950)
- Wife (Mikio Naruse, 1953)
- A Japanese Tragedy (Keisuke Kinoshita, 1953)
- Wolf (Kaneto Shindō, 1955)
- Live Today, Die Tomorrow! (Kaneto Shindō, 1970)
- Oh, My Son! (Keisuke Kinoshita, 1979)

=== Television ===
- Nyonin Musashi (1971)
