= Wolf (1955 film) =

1955 Japanese film

- DVD cover

Japanese name
- Kanji: 狼
- Directed by: Kaneto Shindō
- Written by: Kaneto Shindō
- Produced by: Toshio Itoya; Tengo Yamada; Setsuo Noto
- Starring: Nobuko Otowa; Jun Hamamura; Ichirō Sugai; Sanae Takasugi; Taiji Tonoyama
- Cinematography: Takeo Itō
- Edited by: Zenju Imaizumi
- Music by: Akira Ifukube
- Production company: Kindai Eiga Kyōkai
- Release date: 3 July 1955 (Japan)
- Running time: 127 minutes
- Country: Japan
- Language: Japanese

The Wolves or Wolf (Japanese: 狼, Hepburn: Okami) is a 1955 Japanese crime drama film written and directed by Kaneto Shindō.

== Plot ==
After an opening sequence showing a group of people hijacking a post office truck, a montage of press coverage and police investigations, and the arrest of Akiko, one of the gang members, the film switches to a flashback narration covering the preceding events: A group of 5 insurance salesmen and -women are facing dismissal for not accomplishing the company's sales plan, with all of them already living under precarious social conditions. War widows Akika and Fujibayashi have to raise their children on their own, Yoshikawa and Mikawa, one a hapless screenwriter, one a former car factory worker who lost his job after an accident, can hardly feed their families, and Harashima, a bank clerk fired for his union activities, lives in an unhappy marriage with a wife who refuses to divorce him without severance. Desperate, they decide to rob a post office money transport on its daily route. The coup was successful, but later the members of the group, titled "wolves" in the press, were caught one after another. The last to be arrested is Akiko, who needed the money for an operation on her disfigured son, and is already being expected by the police at the hospital where her son is treated.

== Cast ==
- Nobuko Otowa as Akiko Yano
- Jun Hamamura as Harashima
- Ichirō Sugai as Fusajirō Yoshikawa
- Sanae Takasugi as Tomie Fujibayashi
- Taiji Tonoyama as Yoshiyuki Mikawa
- Bokuzen Hidari
- Tanie Kitabayashi
- Masao Mishima
- Tomoko Naraoka
- Eitarō Ozawa
- Sumie Sasaki
- Masami Shimojō
- Tsutomu Shimomoto
- Kinzō Shin as Hideo Yamamoto
- Kin Sugai
- Yoshiko Tsubouchi
- Eijirō Tōno
- Jūkichi Uno

== Production ==
Shindō had based his screenplay on an actual event, the robbing of a truck by a group of five insurance agents, including two women, who had no previous criminal records and acted out of sheer poverty. The film was produced by Shindō's and actor Taiji Tonoyama's production company Kindai Eiga Kyōkai after Nikkatsu studios backed out of the project shortly before shooting began. Instead, Itō Takerō of the independent company Dokuritsu Eiga helped fund the production. Wolf was shown in only a few independent cinemas and was a failure with the audience. Tonoyama, who appeared in many of Shindō's films, later stated that this was his favourite role of all of the director's films.
