= Coppelion =

Japanese manga series

- First tankōbon volume cover, featuring Ibara Naruse

コッペリオン (Kopperion)
- Genre: Action; Military science fiction
- Manga
- Written by: Tomonori Inoue
- Published by: Kodansha
- Magazine: Weekly Young Magazine (June 9, 2008 – May 7, 2012); Monthly Young Magazine (May 9, 2012 – February 20, 2016)
- Original run: June 9, 2008 – February 20, 2016
- Volumes: 26
- Anime television series
- Directed by: Shingo Suzuki; Hiromichi Kanazawa; Susumu Kudō
- Written by: Makoto Nakamura
- Music by: Mikio Endō
- Studio: GoHands
- Licensed by: NA: Viz Media
- Original network: AT-X, BS11
- English network: SEA: Animax Asia
- Original run: October 2, 2013 – December 25, 2013
- Episodes: 13
- icon

Coppelion (Japanese: コッペリオン, Hepburn: Kopperion) is a Japanese manga series written and illustrated by Tomonori Inoue. The story follows three high school girls who were genetically engineered to be impervious to radioactivity and sent to Tokyo after the city was contaminated by a nuclear accident. It was serialized in Kodansha's seinen manga magazine Weekly Young Magazine from June 2008 to May 2012, and later in Monthly Young Magazine from May 2012 to February 2016, with its chapters collected in twenty-six tankōbon volumes.

An anime adaptation by GoHands aired from October to December 2013 in Japan with a simulcast airing on the same day in Asia on Animax Asia. Viz Media has licensed the anime for streaming and home video release in North America.

== Plot ==
In 2016, a catastrophe occurs after a nuclear meltdown from the nearby Odaiba nuclear power plant contaminates Tokyo, forcing the government to order its citizens to evacuate. Twenty years later, in the year 2036, Tokyo has now become a ghost town due to the high levels of radiation, because of which the government has banned entry for anyone. When a distress signal is received from Tokyo, the Japan Ground Self-Defense Force dispatches three teenage high school girls from the Dispatch 3rd Special Force Coppelion, who comprise the "Healthcare Team". Due to genetic engineering, the Coppelions are immune to radiation while also possessing special skills. Thus the Coppelions journey to the ruined capital to find survivors.

== Characters ==
=== Coppelion members (Rescue and Combat Units) ===
Ibara Naruse (成瀬 荊, Naruse Ibara)
Voiced by: Haruka Tomatsu (Japanese); Erica Lindbeck (English)
The leader of the Coppelion Rescue Unit who possesses superhuman strength and enhanced athletic capabilities, and is a very accurate shooter with guns. She is a kind person, as indicated by her ready desire to help people and her reckless usage of the panacea "Ether" in saving those affected by the radiation. Although she initially used to take nutrient injections in place of consuming food like Haruto, she tasted a rice cake and appreciated normal food, consuming normal food after that, again like Haruto. She is the only character to speak in a Kansai dialect. In episode 11 of the anime, it is hinted that there might be a relationship between her and Haruto.
Aoi Fukasaku (深作 葵, Fukasaku Aoi)
Voiced by: Kana Hanazawa (Japanese); Cassandra Lee Morris (English)
A happy-go-lucky member of the Coppelion Rescue Unit, Aoi is a good listener who's always willing to hear other's problems. She used to be bullied by the Ozu sisters back in school, leading to her intense fear of them. She possesses an escapist mindset, locking herself up in a storeroom of the Planet in her belief that she impedes everyone else's work. She takes a liking to the robot, Nosense, a guide to the Planet. She apparently possesses psychic abilities to the extent of levitation and force-field generation, but lacks any fine control over them. Under such conditions, her physical strength is increased but her memory shuts down during those incidents.
Taeko Nomura (野村 タエ子, Nomura Taeko)
Voiced by: Satomi Akesaka (Japanese); Shelby Lindley (English)
A member of the Coppelion Rescue Unit who possesses heightened senses, especially eyesight, so much so that she has to wear special eyewear in order to tune down her enhanced vision. She befriends a feral dog during their mission. She is medically trained to some extent and has performed surgeries on Naruse Ibara when she was injured and has also helped in delivering Ibuki's child, although she was walked through the process by Granny Ayame.
Haruto Kurosawa (黒澤 遥人, Kurosawa Haruto)
Voiced by: Kenichi Suzumura (Japanese); Max Mittelman (English)
A member of the Cleanup Crew, the Coppelion Combat Unit. He is skilled in the use of guns and explosives as well as the art of making new ones. He initially possesses an aversion to "normal" humans, after being counseled by Ibara, Aoi and Taeko, he develops a curiosity towards humans. In the penultimate episode, when Gojiro asks him why he helps humans, he answers "... we need you", and near the end of episode 11, there is an indication of a relationship between him and Ibara. He is thought to be dead.
Kanon Ozu (小津 歌音, Ozu Kanon)
Voiced by: Yui Horie (Japanese); Cherami Leigh (English)
The elder sister of the Ozu Twins and member of the Coppelion Combat Unit. Kanon possesses the DNA of an electric eel which allows her to emit electricity from her body. The Ozu sisters are murderous psychopaths as the human they were cloned from was a famous actress who was also secretly a serial killer. She is afraid of going near water as she can electrocute herself.
Shion Ozu (小津 詩音, Ozu Shion)
Voiced by: Maaya Sakamoto (Japanese); Sarah Anne Williams (English)
The younger sister of the Ozu Twins and member of the Coppelion Combat Unit. She possesses strong bones and superhuman strength which even surpasses that of Ibara.

=== Other characters ===
Onihei Mishima (三島 鬼兵, Mishima Onihei)
Voiced by: Rikiya Koyama (Japanese); Keith Silverstein (English)
A JGSDF colonel and the Coppelion's vice principal. He lost his wife and daughter from the nuclear meltdown.
Mushanokōji (武者小路, Mushanokōji)
Voiced by: Chafurin (Japanese); Joe J. Thomas (English)
A scientist working with the JGSDF. He is portly and likes eating, to the extent that Vice Principal Onihei can extract favors from him by bribing him with promises of sushi.
Gojiro Kajii
Voiced by: Masahiko Tanaka (Japanese); Marc Diraison (English)
A worker at Shinto Electric and the father of Ibuki Kajii.

== Media ==
=== Manga ===
Coppelion, written and illustrated by Tomonori Inoue, was serialized in Kodansha's Weekly Young Magazine from June 9, 2008, to May 7, 2012. It was then transferred to Monthly Young Magazine, being serialized from May 9, 2012, to February 20, 2016. The manga's last chapter was drawn live in a free seminar at the Vantan Game Academy in Osaka, on November 22, 2015. Kodansha collected its chapters in twenty-six tankōbon volumes, released from October 6, 2008, to April 6, 2016.

The manga was available in English on Crunchyroll from 2013 until 2018.

=== Anime ===
In September 2010, the 40th issue of Weekly Young Magazine announced that an anime television adaption of the manga was greenlighted, but due to the Fukushima Daiichi nuclear disaster, production of the anime was put on hold. The anime was later revived in 2013 and produced by Studio GoHands which aired from October 2, 2013, to December 25, 2013. The anime was also simulcasted aired in Asia on the same day as Japan by Animax Asia and licensed by Viz Media for North America on their online streaming service, Viz Anime, and also for home video release on 2014. Both the opening theme song "Angel" and the ending theme song "Tōku Made" (遠くまで; "Far") are sung by angela. A second theme song, "Bye Bye All Right" by angela was used for the 13th episode.

==== Episodes ====
No.	Title	Original release date
1	"Puppet (Coppelion)"; Transliteration: "Ningyo (Kopperion)" (Japanese: 人形 (コッペリオン))	October 2, 2013
The Coppelion Healthcare Team, composed of Ibara Naruse, Aoi Fukasaku and Taeko Nomura, who are teenage girls who have been genetically engineered to be immune to nuclear radiation, are sent to an abandoned and contaminated Tokyo after the JGSDF receives a distress signal from the city. After finding a survivor, who is dying from high levels of radiation, Ibara chooses to save the man and gives him a cure despite orders from her superior officer and vice-principal, Colonel Onihei Mishima, not to do anything. After the survivor is airlifted to safety, Aoi and Taeko question themselves as to whether they are even human, which Ibara assures them that they are. The next day, as the Coppelions continue to search for the origin of the distress signal, Onihei shows a live news feed of the power plant, also known as the Sarcophagus, that had caused the nuclear meltdown twenty years ago. While Taeko goes to befriend a wild dog, Ibara and Aoi discover a survivor's body who died by suicide, only for Ibara and Aoi to be attacked by a feral wolf. After tranquilizing the wolf, Ibara and Aoi fear that the dog Taeko has befriended might be feral as well and go to rescue her.
2	"Future"; Transliteration: "Mirai" (Japanese: 未来)	October 9, 2013
Ibara and Aoi find the dog injured and Taeko taken hostage by a survivor, having to subdue him as a result. The survivor, Mitsuo Kawabata, asks for their help in finding his daughter Miku, bringing them to an underground home, where a ration truck used to come weekly for survival. He, his wife Yukiko and his late wife, who is Miku's mother, were prisoners who escaped during the confusion of the meltdown, due to why he did not call for help. Mitsuo, believing Miku might be at her late mother's grave in a stadium, takes Ibara and Taeko there while Aoi stays with Yukiko. Meanwhile, Onihei learns that the hazmat suit from the survivor they rescued has better protection than theirs. Ibara and Taeko discover that Miku is not in the stadium and learns from Aoi that Yukiko has disappeared. After learning from Aoi that Yukiko went to prison for killing her own child and wants to be a better mother for her stepdaughter, Ibara realizes that Yukiko took Miku hostage because she did not want to leave Tokyo. Thanks to Taeko's dog, the Coppelions track Yukiko to a leaning hotel, where she reveals that her husband would be arrested, leaving their daughter alone, if they were to be rescued. After convincing Yukiko for her stepdaughter's sake, half of the hotel collapses, but Ibara is able to save Miku due to Yukiko's sacrifice. Hoping to get Mitsuo from the stadium, Onihei sends Ibara by helicopter, but due to the stadium's dangerous radiation levels, Mitsuo slowly dies while remaining grateful to the Coppelions for rescuing his daughter. Before Onihei leaves with the girl, Aoi apologizes to Miku that they could not save her parents, but they must go to find other survivors.
3	"Hope"; Transliteration: "Kibō" (Japanese: 希望)	October 16, 2013
The Coppelions meet the man who has been delivering supplies and hazmat suits to the survivors, Dr. Denjiro Shiba, whom the girls learn from Onihei to be the scientist who designed the Obaida Nuclear Power Plant. Feeling responsible for the meltdown and how not all the survivors could escape Tokyo, Denjiro tries to make amends by helping the survivors. However, with high level radiation spreading recently, Denjiro and his assistant Kamata are unable to deliver supplies to the survivors, which led them to use a distress signal to call for help. The Coppelions decide to help Denjiro rescue the other survivors, but after he agrees to surrender himself to the authorities. Ibara tries to rescue an old woman named Granny Ayame from a museum, but discovers that she has been kidnapped by two mercenaries for having seen them. Ibara tracks them to military airfield, where the mercenaries try to bring Granny Ayame into their B2 stealth jet. A gunfight ensues, where Ibara manages to rescue Granny Ayame while the men fly off on their jet. Wanting to interrogate them for answers, Denjiro and the Coppelions chase the jet on a jeep with Ibara armed with a missile launcher.
4	"Sunset"; Transliteration: "Yūhi" (Japanese: 夕陽)	October 23, 2013
After a wild chase during which the jet attempts to kill them, Ibara manages to shoot it down after which it crash lands into a lake stadium. When the Coppelions arrive at the stadium, the mercenaries had just died. As they investigate the jet, they discover barrels of radioactive waste in the lake, now realizing what was going on. The mercenaries were working with Yellow Cake, a recycling waste company who had secretly been dumping radioactive waste from around the world into Tokyo, knowing no one would be coming there, which ended up causing the recent rise in radiation levels. Ibara becomes angry upon learning about this, while Denjiro feels that everything is his fault and wants to atone for his faults. Fearing that Denjiro might kill himself, Ibara tracks him to a shrine only to find him removing his helmet. With only ten minutes before the effects of the anti-radiation properties of the Ether bullet injection are gone, the Coppelions quickly drive him to the airfield to be evacuated by Onihei. However, the helicopter has yet to arrive. Denjiro tells everyone to just let him die to atone for his sins, but Ibara refuses. With a few seconds left, Onihei's helicopter arrives. He throws another Ether bullet to Ibara in order to save Denjiro. As the helicopter gets Kamata and Granny Ayame on board, Onihei helps Denjiro get on board despite Denjiro being indirectly responsible for his family's death during the meltdown. Denjiro apologises to the girls for the world they now live in and gives them a list of the other survivors in Tokyo. As the Coppelions continue their mission, Aoi and Taeko assure Ibara that they will always be there for her.
5	"Life"; Transliteration: "Seimei" (Japanese: 生命)	October 30, 2013
The Coppelions head to a JAXA facility to rescue the next group of survivors, only to encounter a transport driven by Gojiro Kajii and his pregnant daughter Ibuki being attacked by the Ghosts of the First Division, a group of JGSDF soldiers who were left behind after Tokyo was sealed off, who have now started attacking other survivors. The Coppelions manage to rescue the Kajiis who are then picked up by their friends from the JAXA facility, Oyakata Kurobe and Gennai Ishikawa in an AFV. Taeko is shot protecting Ibuki and Ibara requests a medevac for the two. However, Prime Minister Natsume, upon learning the remnants of the First Division are still alive, refuses to send any rescue until the First Division is eliminated. With Onihei unable to help since he has to attend an important international conference that will last three days, Ibara and Aoi decide to stay with the JAXA survivors at their home in the Planet, a giant dome filled with a non-irradiated plants and water. Meanwhile, Onihei orders Coppelion Haruto Kurosawa of the Cleanup Crew to help Ibara.
6	"Planet"; Transliteration: "Wakusei" (Japanese: 惑星)	November 6, 2013
As Haruto heads to Ibara's location, Aoi gets captured by the leader of the Ghosts, Commander Kunikida, who demands that the Coppelions join them or they will never see Aoi again. Ibara, realizing the Ghosts attacked the JAXA survivors in order to lure the Coppelions in a trap to capture them, heads with Oyakata to the First Division base at a park to rescue Aoi, where she manages to hold Kunikida at gun point and orders him to release Aoi. Ibara, hesitating to shoot Kunikida, is beaten by his troops. She is saved when Haruto arrives on his AMV and retrieves her, while he is forced to leave Aoi behind. After Ibara regains consciousness, Haruto mentions not to worry about Aoi. Thanks to a transmitter that Haruto placed on Aoi earlier, the Ghosts are tracked at a nearby water treatment plant to retrieve barrels of radioactive waste. Ibara and Haruto begin their plan to rescue Aoi while Gennai and Oyakata distract the troops. However, Ibara is shocked to learn that Haruto and the Cleanup Crew were trained to kill people, which she is against. Despite Haruto killing some troops, Ibara hopes to rescue Aoi without killing anyone, but she is caught by Kunikida. To her shock, Ibara learns that the First Division's bodies have mutated and adapted to living in the radiation, hence they do not fear dying. Ibara offers to help him, but Kunikida orders one of his tanks to shoot them, yet Aoi manages to escape. However, Aoi, Haruto, Gennai and Oyakata find Ibara heavily injured.
7	"Haruto"; Transliteration: "Haruto" (Japanese: 遥人)	November 13, 2013
Haruto and Aoi manage to resuscitate Ibara using an AED and bring her back to the Planet as Ibara is suffering blood loss due to a shrapnel shell wound. Taeko safely removes the shrapnel shell and Haruto donates his blood to Ibara as they both have the same blood type. Aoi, blaming herself for Ibara's injuries, locks herself in a storage room. Meanwhile, Haruto interrogates Kunikida, who reveals that the Ghosts are planning to detonate the Sarcophagus after collecting it with radioactive waste in order to create a countrywide nuclear fallout as revenge against the government for abandoning them, which is why they want the Coppelions since the radiations levels at the Sarcophagus are too high. Despite the Coppelions' warnings to Onihei, the government refuses to act while the expo is ongoing, fearing the news will make Natsume lose face to the international community. When Ibuki reveals the baby is coming and the government will not send a medical specialist to deliver the baby until after the expo ends in two days, the group heads to a hospital in the center of the capital, while Aoi stays in the Planet in the care of the robotic caretaker Mr. No-sense. While still keeping an eye on Kunikida, Haruto tries to contact his teammates, Kanon Ozu and Shion Ozu, but to no avail. However, Kanon and Shion appear before Ibara and her entourage after surrounding them with barrels of radioactive waste to stop them in their tracks.
8	"Sisters"; Transliteration: "Shimai" (Japanese: 姉妹)	November 20, 2013
Ibara's entourage is attacked by Kanon and Shion, prompting them to hide in an abandoned supermarket. Haruto contacts them and explains that the Ozu Twins were cloned by an actress named Kuon Ozu who was secretly a serial killer. Ibara is captured by Kanon and Shion, who have allied with the Ghosts. After Ibara manages to escape thanks to a stun grenade, she and her entourage then manage to commandeer a First Division tank. With Kanon and Shion chasing them on their motorcycle, Ibara tricks Shion into using her super strength to punch through the tank's hydrogen tank to trap her, shooting a cannonball at both sisters, consequently knocking Shion unconscious. Kanon survives the blast and stuns Ibara using her powers of electricity. Kanon reveals her hatred of humans came after eavesdropping a conversation between Haruto and Onihei that the Coppelions will someday die. With humans using them as dolls, Kanon wants them to die so the Coppelions will be the new dominant race. However, Ibara is unswayed and defeats Kanon by using an electric cable to diffuse her powers. As Ibara leaves Kanon and Shion tied up, No-sense consoles Aoi. Later, Haruto and the rest of the survivors at the Planet learn that due to Kanon and Shion placing barrels of radioactive waste around the city, the radiation is spreading due to an upcoming storm.
9	"Diversion"; Transliteration: "Yōdō" (Japanese: 陽動)	November 27, 2013
With radiation spreading to the Planet in a few days and preventing the survivors from having any safe passage out, the plan to transport the survivors to safety is to divide them into two teams. The maintenance team will fix and use the city's broken rail transport, while the diversion team will create a distraction for Kanon and Shion, who were able to free themselves and are on the move to seek revenge. With Ibuki experiencing more labor pains, Taeko is afraid of delivering the baby until she is contacted by Granny Ayame, who would guide her through the procedure of childbirth. As the Coppelions and the survivors prepare to evacuate the Planet for their escape plans, everyone has one last dinner inside the dome, where Aoi finally comes out thanks to No-sense. Before they leave, Ibuki asks the Coppelions to rescue one more survivor, the baby's father named Tarou, who is revealed to be the First Division soldier who helped Aoi escape. Joined by Aoi and No-sense, Ibara and Haruto head out to draw out Kanon and Shion while Taeko, Ibuki, Gennai, Oyakata and Gojiro heads to the railway.
10	"Human"; Transliteration: "Ningen" (Japanese: 人間)	December 4, 2013
Ibara, Haruto, Aoi and No-sense manage to lure the Ozu Twins and the Ghosts to a park, and Gennai, Oyakata and Gojiro try to fix the railway power lines while Taeko deals with Ibuki's water breaking. Unable to track them due to Haruto's traps, Kanon and Shion head back to the Sarcophagus. To stop them, No-sense carries Aoi to bait the Kanon and Shion to chase them since they bullied Aoi in the past. When No-sense takes the hits to protect Aoi from Shion, Aoi stands up to Shion, activating her teleportation powers before escaping on a paddle boat. With Shion distracted chasing Aoi at the lake, Ibara and Haruto try to find Tarou. However, they are captured by Kanon and the Ghosts, with Kanon electrocuting the two, but they escape thanks to Tarou. After convincing him to join them for Ibuki and their child's sake, the three of them try to rendezvous, with Aoi who is rescued from Shion by No-sense. Meanwhile, Gennai, Oyakata and Gojiro manage to fix the power lines but realize the substation is not sending electricity. With the storm forming early and for his daughter's sake, Gojiro volunteers to fix the substation, revealing he worked at the Daiba Nuclear Power Plant, which was the cause of the accident. Ibara reunites with her team, but the Ghosts summon a giant robot spider to the park.
11	"Awakening"; Transliteration: "Kakusei" (Japanese: 覚醒)	December 11, 2013
As the robot spider chases after the diversion team, Ibara and Haruto hold off Kanon and Shion while Aoi climbs on the robot spider to open up its underbelly hatch to expose its engine and destroy it. However, Kanon and Shion manage to beat Ibara and Haruto. Kanon then shoots an electrical bolt on Aoi, who suddenly floats and absorbs Kanon's electricity, allowing Ibara to destroy the robot spider. With Ibara injured and Aoi unconscious after the battle, Haruto decides to go and help the maintenance team while promising a worried Ibara he will come back. After Haruto helps Gojiro fix the substation, the two head back only to encounter Kunikida, who shoots Haruto. Kunikida explains his hatred of humanity was born after his best friend Natsume, who was then Minister of Defense during the meltdown, abandoned him and the First Division. Oyakata rescues Haruto and Gojiro, yet Haruto begs to spare Kunikida and leave him alive. With the power to the train finally restored and the storm coming, Haruto and the rest of the maintenance team speed up the train. Noticing a lamppost is about to fall into their path, a seriously injured Haruto jumps out to stop it from falling and tells the rest to get the other survivors. With the help of Kunikida, they are able to stop the lamppost from falling on the train. With no escape from the storm, Kunikida thanks Haruto for reminding him of his humanity while Haruto succumbs to his wounds before silently saying goodbye to Ibara.
12	"Promise"; Transliteration: "Yakusoku" (Japanese: 約束)	December 18, 2013
The Ozu Twins and the Ghosts corner Ibara and the diversion team at the train station. Ibara advises Kanon and Shion to surrender due to their injuries from their last battle, but Kanon refuses and accuses Ibara for being ignorant on how the humans have treated the Coppelions. When the maintenance team arrives by train, Ibara blows up the ceiling in order for her and the diversion team with the rest of the First Division deciding to join them all to escape the storm. Meanwhile, upon learning Ibuki is having difficulties delivering the baby, Taeko decides to perform a Caesarean section to save both mother and child. Ibara breaks down in tears upon learning of Haruto's death, but Aoi consoles her for the sake of all the survivors as they still need to help them escape from the capital. Ibara thanks Aoi and tells the survivors to get in the radioactive proof railcar as the train will enter a wall of radioactive fog. Elsewhere, Shion survives from being crushed by the rubble from the ceiling. Although Shion feels unbearable pain to the point of wishing for death, Kanon sympathizes to her for not knowing what pain actually feels like, due to having powers of electricity. The train manages to get out of the radioactive area, but the survivors' celebration is short-lived when a maddened Kanon chases after them by controlling the robot spider with electricity.
13	"Angel"; Transliteration: "Tenshi" (Japanese: 天使)	December 25, 2013
As Kanon chases after the train, Shion protests to Kanon that her life is slowly depleting due to the overuse of her powers. As Onihei and his men races to the old capital by helicopter, Ibara tries to reason with Kanon while defending the train against her attacks. Despite Kanon knocking her out, Ibara manages to stop Kanon by using Haruto's last grenade to blow up a water tower above Kanon, damaging the robot spider. Although Shion is rescued, Kanon chooses to die for having no purpose in life, but Ibara convinces her otherwise by becoming friends. Gennai, who is dying from radiation poisoning after rescuing Oyakata, passes away peacefully after finally seeing the sunset on the skyscrapers. As thanks for rescuing her and Shion, Kanon reveals to Ibara a location where the rescue team may land their helicopter. Everyone is overjoyed when Taeko successfully delivers Ibuki's twin babies. With all of the survivors rescued, the Coppelions say goodbye to the JAXA survivors, but not before giving them a picture of the group before their departure and Ibara naming Ibuki's twins Riku and Sora. As they leave the capital, Onihei reveals to the JAXA survivors the saddening secret about the Coppelions. Ibara, Aoi and Taeko continue their mission to rescue more survivors, with Kanon and Shion joining them as well.

== See also ==
- Candy and Cigarettes, another manga series by the same author
