= Mikio Endō =

Japanese composer, arranger and producer

- Born: August 6, 1967 (age 58)
- Origin: Tokyo, Japan
- Genres: Electronic, jazz
- Occupations: Composer, arranger, producer

Mikio Endō (遠藤 幹雄, Endō Mikio; born 6 August 1967) is a Japanese composer, arranger and producer. He composes soundtracks for television and commercials.

== Discography ==
=== Movie ===
| Year | Film title | Role(s) |
|---|---|---|
| 2004 | Cutie Honey | Music Director |
| 2014 | K: Missing Kings | Composer |

=== Television Drama ===
| Year | Film title | Role(s) |
|---|---|---|
| 2011 | Himitsu Chōhōin Erika | Composer |
| 2012 | Soko o Nantoka | Composer |
| 2014 | Soko o Nantoka 2 | Composer |

=== Anime ===
| Year | Anime Title | Role(s) |
|---|---|---|
| 2012 | K | Composer |
| 2013 | Coppelion | Composer |
| 2015 | K: Return of Kings | Composer |
| 2016 | Twin Star Exorcists | Composer |
