= Soko o Nantoka =

Japanese manga series by Mikoto Asou

- Cover of the first manga volume

そこをなんとか
- Manga
- Written by: Mikoto Asou
- Published by: Hakusensha
- Imprint: Hana to Yume Comics Special
- Magazine: Melody
- Original run: 2007 – August 28, 2018
- Volumes: 15
- Television drama
- Directed by: Keiji Kataoka; Takashi Isshiki
- Written by: Masako Imai; Rie Yokota
- Original network: BS Premium
- Original run: October 21, 2012 – December 9, 2012
- Episodes: 9
- Television drama

Soko o Nantoka 2
- Directed by: Keiji Kataoka; Takashi Isshiki
- Written by: Masako Imai; Rie Yokota
- Music by: Mikio Endō
- Original network: BS Premium
- Original run: August 3, 2014 – September 21, 2014
- Episodes: 8

Soko o Nantoka (Japanese: そこをなんとか; "Please Do Something") is a Japanese manga series written and illustrated by Mikoto Asou. It was serialized in Hakusensha's shōjo manga magazine Melody from 2007 to August 28, 2018, with its chapters collected into 15 tankōbon volumes. Soko o Nantoka was adapted into two Japanese television drama series: one in 2012 and another in 2014.

== Characters ==
Rakuko Kaise (改世 楽子, Kaise Rakuko)
Portrayed by: Yuika Motokariya
Hiroaki Shōji (東海林 弘明, Shōji Hiroaki)
Portrayed by: Ichikawa Ennosuke IV
Aki Kubota (久保田 亜紀, Kubota Aki)
Portrayed by: Megumi
Shiori Nakadō (中道 志織, Nakadō Shiori)
Portrayed by: Waka Inoue
Kōtarō Sugawara (菅原 耕太郎, Sugawara Kōtarō)
Portrayed by: Kohei Otomo
