= Candy and Cigarettes =

Japanese manga series

- First tankōbon volume cover
- Genre: Action; Neo-noir; Thriller
- Manga
- Written by: Tomonori Inoue
- Published by: Kodansha
- English publisher: NA: Seven Seas Entertainment
- Magazine: Young Magazine the 3rd (January 6, 2017 – April 6, 2021); Monthly Young Magazine (May 20 – July 19, 2021)
- Original run: January 6, 2017 – July 19, 2021
- Volumes: 11
- icon

Candy and Cigarettes (stylized as CANDY & CIGARETTES) is a Japanese manga series written and illustrated by Tomonori Inoue. It was serialized in Kodansha's seinen manga magazine Young Magazine the 3rd from January 2017 to May 2021, with its chapters collected in 11 tankōbon volumes. The series follow a middle-aged former police officer who becomes the assistant to an 11-year-old professional assassin.

== Publication ==
Written and illustrated by Tomonori Inoue, Candy and Cigarettes was first serialized in Kodansha's seinen manga magazine Young Magazine the 3rd from January 6, 2017, to April 6, 2021, when the magazine ceased its publication. The manga was transferred to Monthly Young Magazine, where it ran from May 20 to July 19, 2021. Kodansha collected its chapters in eleven tankōbon volumes, released from June 20, 2017, to November 18, 2021.

In December 2021, Seven Seas Entertainment announced that they had licensed the manga for an English release in North America starting in August 2022.

=== Volumes ===
No.	Original release date	Original ISBN	English release date	English ISBN
1	June 20, 2017	978-4-06-382982-2	October 18, 2022	978-1-63858-590-9
Pulp 1. "The Old Man and Crime"; Pulp 2. "The Littlest Assassin"; Pulp 3. "A Tragedy is Born"; Pulp 4. "Rain-Scented Revenge"
2	November 20, 2017	978-4-06-510344-9	December 13, 2022	978-1-63858-746-0
Pulp 5. "The Hand of God"; Pulp 6. "Midnight Glide"; Pulp 7. "Suit Your Own Damm Self"; Pulp 8. "Bonds and Blood"; Pulp 9. "A Room Somewhere in Nowhere"
3	April 20, 2018	978-4-06-511286-1	February 14, 2023	978-1-63858-871-9
Pulp 10. "A Girl to be Feared"; Pulp 11. "Dead or Alive"; Pulp 12. "Showdown at High Noon"; Pulp 13. "A Double-Egded Knife"; Pulp 14. "L'ecume des jours"
4	November 20, 2018	978-4-06-513553-2	May 23, 2023	978-1-63858-981-5
Pulp 15. "Remote Island Rampage"; Pulp 16. "Water Lily"; Pulp 17. "The Hidden Farm"; Pulp 18. "Partners"; Pulp 19. "Vegas Won't Know What Hit'em"
5	July 19, 2019	978-4-06-516364-1	August 15, 2023	978-1-68579-510-8
Pulp 20. "The Candy Gang Factory"; Pulp 21. "The Wasteland"; Pulp 22. "Limit of Life"; Pulp 23. "Showdown at the Airport"; Pulp 24. "Killing You Softly"
6	April 20, 2020	978-4-06-519188-0	October 31, 2023	978-1-68579-937-3
Pulp 25. "Girl Don't Cry"; Pulp 26. "Black Tentacles"; Pulp 27. "New World Order"; Pulp 28. "Game Watcher"; Pulp 29. "A Violent Wind"
7	April 20, 2020	978-4-06-519220-7	February 13, 2024	979-8-88843-338-6
Pulp 30. "Update"; Pulp 31. "A Lawless Land"; Pulp 32. "Old Wounds"; Pulp 33. "Revenge on Deck"; Pulp 34. "Desert Frontier"
8	December 18, 2020	978-4-06-521713-9	May 7, 2024	979-8-88843-339-3
Pulp 35. "You've Got a Friend"; Pulp 36. "Outsider"; Pulp 37. "Silver Food"; Pulp 38. "Judgement Road"; Pulp 39. "Fake War"
9	May 20, 2021	978-4-06-523285-9	August 13, 2024	979-8-88843-781-0
Pulp 40. "The Man in the Mirror"; Pulp 41. "Sweet Memory"; Pulp 42. "Nobless Oblige"; Pulp 43. "Farewell to Arms"; Pulp 44. "Hard Worker"
10	October 20, 2021	978-4-06-525102-7	November 26, 2024	979-8-89160-037-9
Pulp 45. "New York Serenade"; Pulp 46. "Back at the White House"; Pulp 47. "Gravedigger"; Pulp 48. "Alchemy"; Pulp 49. "Wall Street Confession"
11	November 18, 2021	978-4-06-525881-1	February 4, 2025	979-8-89160-548-0
Pulp 50. "Monster"; Pulp 51. "Death Among the Skyscrapers"; Pulp 52. "The Battle of New Heaven"; Pulp 53. "Last Will"; Pulp 54. "Stairway to Heaven"

== See also ==
- Coppelion, another manga series by the same author
