= Women of the Night =

1948 film by Kenji Mizoguchi

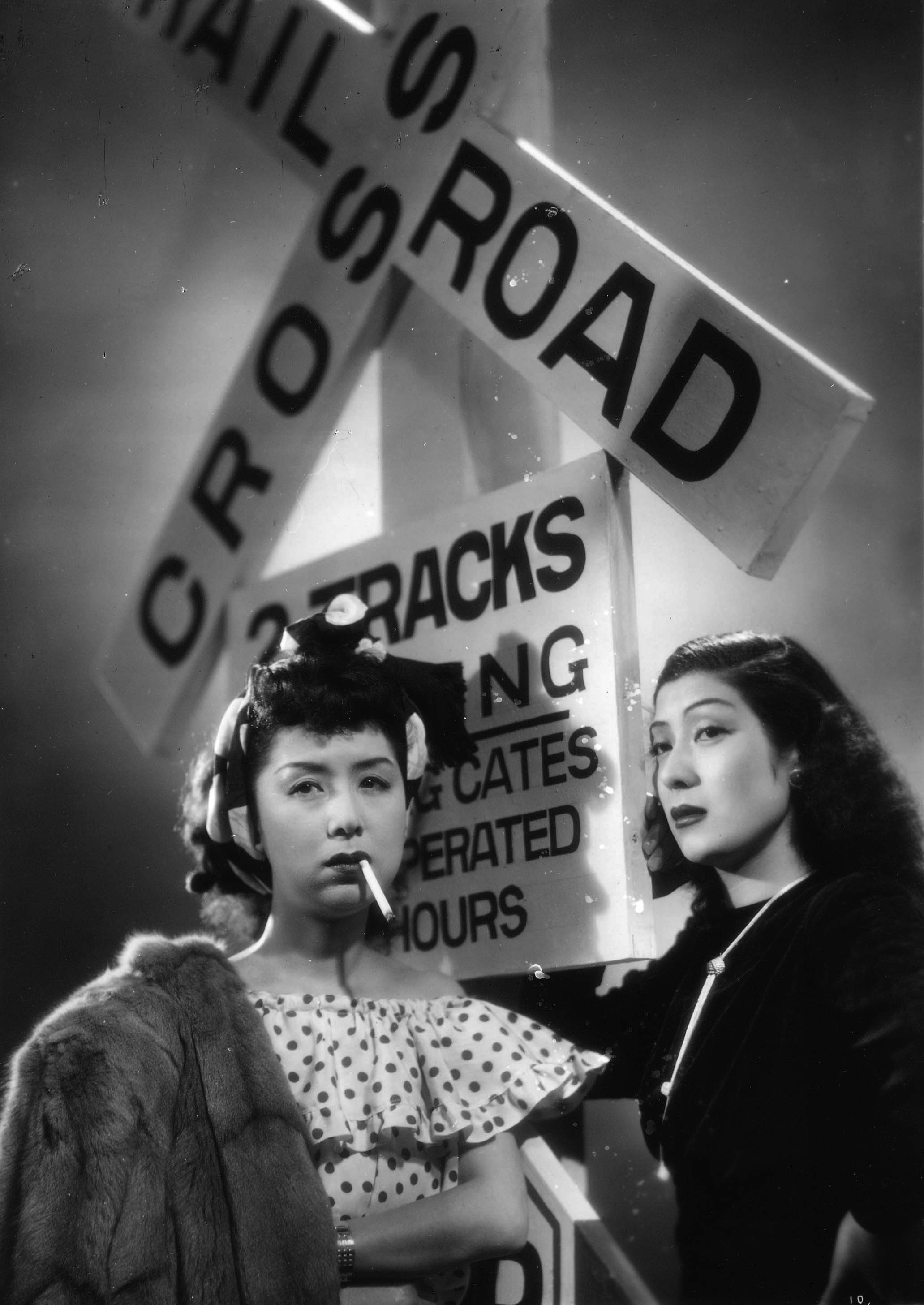
- Directed by: Kenji Mizoguchi
- Written by: Yoshikata Yoda (writer); Eijirō Hisaita (novel)
- Produced by: Hisao Itoya
- Starring: Kinuyo Tanaka; Sanae Takasugi
- Cinematography: Kōhei Sugiyama
- Edited by: Kanji Sugawara
- Music by: Hisato Ōsawa
- Production company: Shochiku
- Distributed by: Shochiku
- Release date: 28 May 1948 (Japan)
- Running time: 74 minutes
- Country: Japan
- Language: Japanese

Women of the Night (1948) by Kenji Mizoguchi

Women of the Night (夜の女たち, Yoru no onna-tachi) is a 1948 Japanese drama film directed by Kenji Mizoguchi starring Kinuyo Tanaka.

== Plot ==
In early post-war Osaka, three women - war widow Fusako, her sister Natsuko, and Fusako's sister-in-law Kumiko - descend into prostitution, all for their own individual reasons.

Fusako begins the film struggling to take care of her infant child. She sells her possessions to buy food, but cannot afford her child's vaccinations. Fusako and her infant live with her husband's mother, his brother, a war veteran, and his sister Kumiko, a teenage girl, while they wait for Fusako's husband to return from the war. Although Fusako's self-centered brother-in-law supports the family to a great extent, he complains that vaccinations are unnecessary and overpriced, and he is not willing to pay for them. Fusako angrily rejects a shopkeeper's suggestion of becoming a prostitute to make ends meet. Her baby dies of illness.

After learning that Fusako's husband has died in the war, Kuriyama, a wealthy businessman, offers Fusako a job as his secretary. His real goal is to seduce her. After Kuriyama tells her that he truly cares for her and will support her, Fusako reluctantly agrees to become Kuriyama's mistress. Fusako moves out of the Owada house, and Kuriyama, who has turned to opium smuggling, uses Fusako to hide his contraband. However, Kuriyama develops an interest in Fusako's sister Natsuko, who was repatriated from Japanese-occupied Korea after the war, and works as a hostess at a dance hall that Kuriyama frequents. Kuriyama begins sleeping with Natsuko. Devastated and betrayed, Fusako becomes a prostitute.

Struck by her conscience, Natsuko tries to find Fusako, but that night, the police raid the Osaka brothels. They mistake Natsuko for a prostitute, arrest her, and bring her to a prison hospital. A representative from a "purity association" visits the hospital, but her condescending manner alienates the prostitutes, who rhetorically ask her how Japanese society proposes to feed them if they can no longer resort to sex work. Natsuko finds Fusako in the hospital, but Fusako scolds her for stealing her paramour and declares that she intends to revenge herself on the men of Japan by infecting them with syphilis.

During a medical exam, the prison doctors inform Natsuko that she is pregnant with Kuriyama's baby and that she has contracted syphilis herself. (It is implied that Kuriyama has been cheating on both sisters.) After Natsuko is released from the hospital, she has a heated conversation with Kuriyama, who callously minimizes his treatment of Fusako and orders an unwilling Natsuko to get an abortion. Before Kuriyama can drag Natsuko to the abortion clinic, the police coincidentally arrest him for opium smuggling.

Meanwhile, after quarreling with her brother, Kumiko steals money from her family and runs away from home. Concerned that Kumiko's family will blame the sisters for corrupting her, Natsuko turns Kumiko away. Looking for a man to support her, Kumiko is deceived by a gangster who rapes her and robs her of her money. His accomplices steal her possessions and clothes, but offer to let her join them. Unwilling to face her brother's wrath, Kumiko reluctantly agrees to become a prostitute.

Having learned from the prison doctors that her baby will die unless she receives treatment for her syphilis, Natsuko desperately tries and fails to find another wealthy lover. She enters premature labor, and Fusako takes her to a medical clinic at a reformatory for former prostitutes. During the delivery, Fusako converses with a disapproving clinician. She explains that she does not want to be a prostitute, but men treat her as an object, and she has no options left. She reaffirms her desire to get revenge on men, but when the clinician asks whether she has been successful, she is unable to respond.

Due to Natsuko's untreated infection, the baby is stillborn. A devastated Natsuko expresses hope that someday, she will get married and bear a healthy child. Horrified by the effects of syphilis, Fusako resolves to quit prostitution. Although the clinicians urge Fusako to join the reformatory, she decides to go her own way.

While walking outside, Fusako sees a rival group of prostitutes beating up Kumiko (who has been soliciting clients on their turf) in the ruins of a bombed-out Christian church. Fusako tearfully convinces Kumiko to quit, explaining that revenge and disillusionment will only destroy herself. Insulted by Fusako's rejection of prostitution, the prostitutes' leader savagely beats Fusako, but she is eventually restrained by the other prostitutes, who urge Kumiko and Fusako to leave the red-light district and never return. The two women leave, heading for an uncertain future.

== Cast ==
- Kinuyo Tanaka as Fusako Owada, the protagonist
- Sanae Takasugi as Natsuko Kimishima, Fusako's sister
- Tomie Tsunoda as Kumiko Owada, Fusako's sister-in-law
- Minpei Miyamoto as Kōji Owada, Fusako's brother-in-law
- Umeko Ōbayashi as Tokuko Owada, Fusako's mother-in-law
- Mitsuo Nagata as Kenzō Kuriyama, an opium smuggler who solicits both Fusako and Natsuko for sexual favors
- Kumeko Urabe as madam of the brothel
- Kimie Hayashi as Kazuko, a prostitute
- Kenzō Tanaka as Shuichi Hirata
- Fusako Maki as the representative of the Purity Association, an anti-prostitution activist group
- Kikue Mori as the shopkeeper who encourages Fusako to become a prostitute

== Production ==
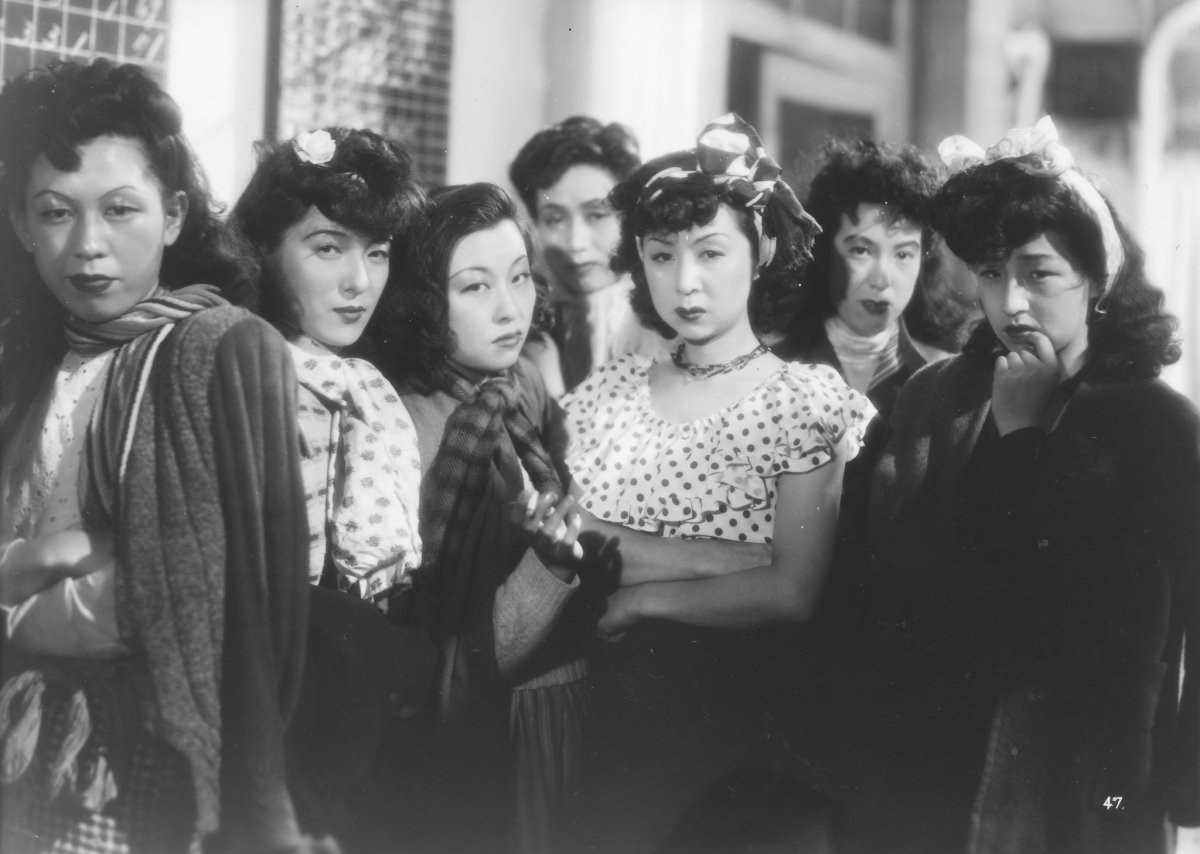
Still image of the film

Censor Harry Slott of the Civil Information and Education Section (CIE) Motion Picture Office endorsed the film's subject of women who resort to prostitution, and several health and welfare organisations announced their support for the production. Women of the Night was filmed on location in Osaka, including a scene in a hospital ward for prostitutes.

== Reception ==
Contemporary reactions to Mizoguchi's film were mixed, ranging from condemnation for being sensational to praise for its realistic depiction of women struggling to survive in post-war Japan. In his 2005 biography on Mizoguchi, Mark Le Fanu titled Women of the Night, although a minor film in his opinion, one of the director's "most outspokenly engaged denunciations of the oppression of women in society". Reviewers, including Le Fanu, Donald Richie, and Dudley and Paul Andrew also drew comparisons between Mizoguchi's film and Italian neorealism.

=== Awards ===
Mizoguchi's film reached number three on Kinema Junpo's list of the ten best Japanese films of 1948, and Kinuyo Tanaka received the same year's Mainichi Film Award for Best Actress (for Women of the Night and A Hen in the Wind).

== Legacy ==
Women of the Night was screened at the Harvard Film Archive in 2014 as part of its retrospective on Mizoguchi, and by the British Film Institute in 2017 as part of its Tears and Laughter: Women in Japanese Melodrama special.
