= Ichikawa Ennosuke IV =

Japanese actor (born 1975)

Ichikawa Ennosuke IV 四代目 市川 猿之助
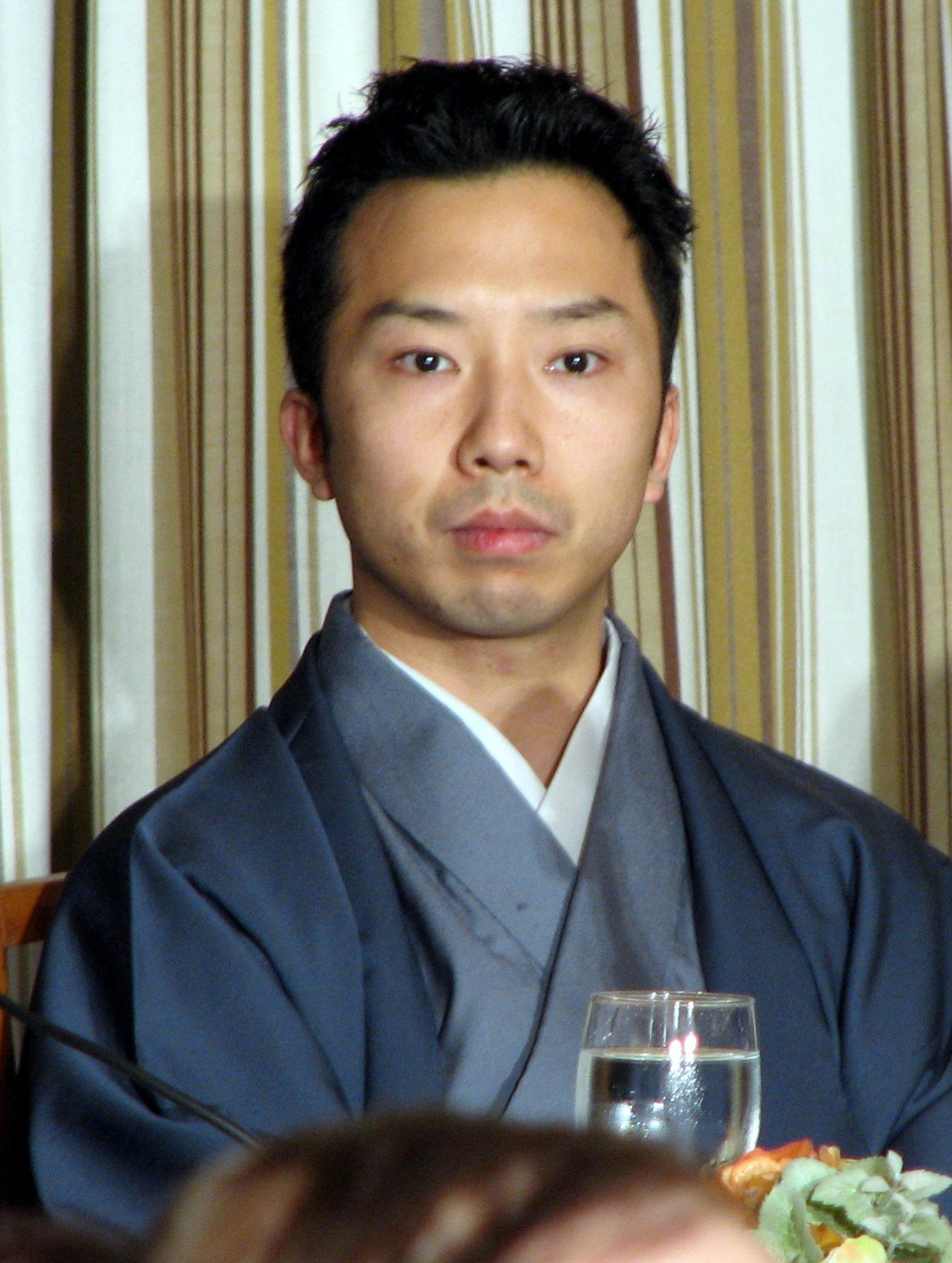
- 2007
- Born: Takahiko Kinoshi; 26 November 1975 (age 50); Tokyo, Japan
- Other name: Ichikawa Kamejirō II
- Father: Ichikawa Danshirō IV
- Relatives: Ichikawa Danshirō II (great-great-grandfather); Ichikawa En'ō I (great-grandfather); Ichikawa Danshirō III (grandfather); Ichikawa En'ō II (uncle); Ichikawa Chusha IX (cousin); Ichikawa Danko V (cousin)

Takahiko Kinoshi (喜熨斗 孝彦, Kinoshi Takahiko; born 26 November 1975), better known by the stage name Ichikawa Ennosuke IV (四代目 市川 猿之助, Yodaime Ichikawa Ennosuke), is a Japanese kabuki, film, and television actor and stage director.

== Early life and career ==
Ichikawa Ennosuke IV was born on 26 November 1975, in Tokyo, Japan, into a family with deep connections to the kabuki tradition. He is the son of Hiroyuki Kinoshi, stage name Ichikawa Danshirō IV, a kabuki actor known for his aragoto style of performances. Ennosuke made his first stage appearance as the child emperor Antoku in the kabuki production Yoshitsune Senbon Zakura at the age of 5. Three years later in 1983, he took the stage name Ichikawa Kamejirō II (二代目 市川 亀治郎, Nidaime Ichikawa Kamejirō). He became known for his tachiyaku and onnagata roles over the course of his career, in addition to his repertoire of dances.

Ennosuke made his television debut in 2007 in the taiga drama Fūrin Kazan as Takeda Shingen, from there he began being cast in major supporting roles in high-profile dramas such as Ryōmaden (2010), Naoki Hanzawa (2020), and The 13 Lords of the Shogun (2022). He has also made several film appearances.

In 2012, his uncle Kinoshi Masahiko, stage name Ichikawa Ennosuke III, retired from kabuki and passed his appellation to Takahiko, heretofore known as Kamejirō II. From this point on, Takahiko would become known as Ichikawa Ennosuke IV, the fourth in his family to carry the name. Ennosuke IV has carried on his predecessor's mission in revitalizing the art of kabuki to attract contemporary audiences with what's called "Super Kabuki" productions, playing a central role in a kabuki reimagining of the manga One Piece (Super Kabuki II: One Piece) that achieved major commercial success.

== Arrest ==
Ennosuke and his parents were found unconscious on 18 May 2023 by his manager in their home in the Meguro ward of Tokyo. Ennosuke survived, but his mother Nobuko was pronounced dead at the scene, while his father Danshirō IV was declared dead on arrival at the hospital. All three were found to have overdosed on sleeping pills. On the day the three were discovered in their homes, the weekly magazine Josei Seven published a report detailing allegations that Ennosuke had bullied staff and sexually harassed female cast members. Ennosuke told police that the report prompted him to hold a family meeting with his parents, in which the three decided to "say goodbye" and "to meet in the next world."

On June 27, Ennosuke was arrested on a charge of assisting suicide by supplying his mother with prescription sleeping pills and covering her head with a plastic bag. On July 18 he was arrested again on a separate charge for doing the same to his father. He was indicted on both charges on July 28, and was released on bail set at 5 million yen on July 31. He pleaded guilty to the charges, and was sentenced to 3 years imprisonment, suspended for 5 years on November 17.

When news of his initial arrest broke, NHK removed shows featuring Ennosuke from its streaming service as had been done for other actors embroiled in criminal investigations. Due to public opposition to the decision, NHK announced on July 26 that they will no longer pull shows off on-demand streaming services in similar situations as a policy to "respect the freedom of consumer choice", and indicated that the affected shows would be made available again.

== Lineage ==
Born into a renowned Tokyo kabuki acting family (known as Omodakaya or Kagawa family), Takahiko is the fourth kabuki actor to assume the prestigious name Ichikawa Ennosuke, being known as Ichikawa Ennosuke IV (四代目 市川猿之助).

His great-great-grandfather, Ichikawa Danshirō II (二代目 市川段四郎) was a prominent Japanese kabuki actor and dancer who was the founder of the Omodakaya acting house and also the first kabuki actor from this acting house to bear the name Ichikawa Ennosuke (usually given to the head of the Omodakaya house), being known as Ichikawa Ennosuke I (初代 市川猿之助).

His great-grandfather, Ichikawa En'ō I (初代 市川猿翁) was one of the most important Kabuki actors and dancers of the Showa era, being responsible for creating numerous dance-dramas for the Kabuki theater, in addition to being the founder of Shunjūza, a well-known study group focused on Kabuki theater. He was the second Kabuki actor to bear the name Ichikawa Ennosuke, being known for most of his career as Ichikawa Ennosuke II (二代目 市川猿之助).

His great-great-uncle, Ichikawa Chūsha VIII (八代目 市川中車) was a tachiyaku actor whose career spanned from the end of the Meiji era to the middle of the Showa era and who, unlike the rest of his family, was a member of the Tachibanaya acting house and not the Omodokaya acting house.

His grandfather, Ichikawa Danshirō III (三代目 市川段四郎) was an actor and Kabuki dancer known for his dancing skills, although he did not achieve the same level of fame as his father (Ennosuke II/En'ō I) or grandson (Ennosuke III/En'ō II).

His father, Ichikawa Danshirō IV (四代目 市川段四郎) was a popular and outstanding tachiyaku and katakiyaku actor who was known for playing aragoto roles, being considered one of the leading aragotoshi of the late Showa and early Heisei eras and was the leading aragotoshi of the Omodakaya acting house until his retirement in 2015.

His uncle, Ichikawa Ennosuke III (三代目 市川猿之助) or Ichikawa En'ō II (二代目 市川猿翁), was one of the most celebrated and revolutionary Kabuki actors and dancers of the Showa era and the early Heisei era, as he was the creator of a new genre of Kabuki theater, known as Super Kabuki, in addition to being famous for perfecting several techniques that had been sidelined in more recent eras of Kabuki theater, known as keren and for having flown over the audience more than any other Kabuki actor (which earned him the nickname "The King of Chunori").

His cousin (son of the late Ichikawa En'ō II), Ichikawa Chūsha IX (九代目 市川中車) is a popular Kabuki, film and television actor who is known for his prolific career in both Kabuki theater and in film and television, as well as being the ninth Kabuki actor of the Omodakaya house to be the bearer of the prestigious name Ichikawa Chūsha.

His nephew (Chūsha IX's son), Ichikawa Danko V (五代目 市川團子) is a rising kabuki star who is the heir to the Omodakaya acting house and the future head of the Omodakaya house. It is said that he will become the head of the Omodakaya acting house in the future and take one of these four possible names:

- Ichikawa En'ō III (三代目 市川猿翁), in honor of his great-great-grandfather Ichikawa En'ō I (初代 市川猿翁) and his grandfather Ichikawa En'ō II (二代目 市川猿翁).
- Ichikawa Danshirō V (五代目 市川談四郎), in honor of his great-uncle, Ichikawa Danshirō IV (四代目 市川段四郎).
- Ichikawa Ennosuke V (五代目 市川猿之助), the most prestigious name in his family (and one of the most prestigious in Kabuki theater) in honor of his grandfather, Ichikawa Ennosuke III (三代目 市川猿之助)/Ichikawa En'ō II (二代目 市川猿翁) and his uncle, Ichikawa Ennosuke IV.
- Ichikawa Chūsha X (十代目 市川中車), in honor of his father, Ichikawa Chusha IX (九代目 市川中車).

== Filmography ==
=== Television drama ===
- NHK taiga drama
  - Fūrin Kazan (2007) as Takeda Shingen
  - Ryōmaden (2010) as Imai Nobuo
  - The 13 Lords of the Shogun (2022) as Mongaku
- Puzzle (2008) as Kenji Hashimoto
- Nanase Futatabi (2008) as Detective Takamura
- Nene: Onna Taikōki (2009) as Toyotomi Hideyoshi
- Hissatsu Shigotonin 2009 (2009) as Yasukawa Shingo
- Shirasu Jirō (2009) as Jirō Aoyama
- Hanchō: Jinnansho Azumihan (2009) as Andy Matsuo
- Daibutsu Kaigan (2010) as Genbō
- Detective Tokunosuke Jinbo 4 (2010) as Shūichi Ichinose
- Detective Tokunosuke Jinbo 5 (2011) as Shūichi Ichinose
- Rikon Syndrome (2010) as Mitsutoshi Itō
- Chance (2010) as Kenji Fujimoto
- Necchu Jidai (2011) as Keisuke Tōjō
- Jin (2011) as Nakaoka Shintarō
- Bull Doctor (2011) as Takahiro Ōdachi
- Hikaru Hekiga (2011) as Shūjiro Tsukamoto
- Man of Destiny (2012) as Hiroshi Yokomizo
- Soko o Nantoka (2012) as Hiroaki Shōji
- A Chef of Nobunaga (2013) as Kennyo
- Sennyu Tantei Tokage (2013) as Yoshiki Sudō
- Pin to Kona (2013) as Jūdō Kawamura
- Camera Man Aaiichirō no Meikyū Suiri (2013) as Aichirō A
- A Chef of Nobunaga Part II (2014) as Kennyo
- Soko o Nantoka 2 (2014) as Hiroaki Shōji
- Yōkoso, Wagaya e (2015) as Shinshi Akazaki
- Watashi to iu Na no Hensōkyoku (2015) as Yasuhiko Hamano
- Black Pean (2018) as Keisuke Nishizaki
- Everyone's Demoted!! (2019) as Ryōsuke Machida
- Yumeshokudō no Ryōrinin: Senkyūrokujūyon Tōkyō Olympic Senshūmura Monogatari (2019) as Shunichi Murayama
- Naoki Hanzawa (2020) as Taiji Isayama
- Miyako ga Kyoto ni Yattekita! (2021) as Junpei
- Tokyo Chiken no Otoko (2021) as Kōichi Saegusa
- Thus Spoke Rohan Kishibe (2021) as Masazō Kinoto
- Saisho wa pā (2022) as Ginpei Sawamura

=== Film ===
- Snakes and Earrings (2008) as Detective
- The Magic Hour (2008) as Kame
- After the Flowers (2010) as Fujii Kageyu
- Koi Suru Neapolitan - Sekai de Ichiban Oishii Aisarekata (2010) as Jōji Mizusawa
- Shuffle (2011) as Agasa
- Hakuji no Hito (2012) as Masatoshi Asada
- Tenchi: The Samurai Astronomer (2012) as Seki Takakazu
- Samurai Hustle (2014) as Tokugawa Yoshimune
- Samurai Hustle Returns (2016) as Tokugawa Yoshimune
- Flower and Sword (2017) as Toyotomi Hideyoshi

=== Anime ===
- One Piece: Adventure of Nebulandia (2015) as Komei
- One Piece - Episode of Skypiea (2018) as Gan Fall
