= Ichikawa En'ō II =

Japanese actor (1939–2023)

Ichikawa En'ō II 二代目 市川 猿翁
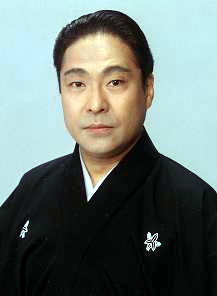
- Born: Masahiko Kinoshi; December 9, 1939; Tokyo, Japan
- Died: September 13, 2023 (aged 83); Tokyo, Japan
- Other names: Ichikawa Ennosuke III, Ichikawa Danko III, Omodakaya
- Spouse: Yuko Hama (m. 1965; div. 1968) Murasaki Fujima (m. 2000; died 2009)
- Children: Ichikawa Chusha IX (son)
- Parent(s): Ichikawa Danshirō III (father); Sanae Takasugi (mother)
- Relatives: Ichikawa Danshirō II (great-grandfather); Ichikawa En'ō I (grandfather); Ichikawa Danko V (grandson); Ichikawa Danshirō IV (younger brother); Ichikawa Ennosuke IV (nephew)

Masahiko Kinoshi (喜熨斗 政彦, Kinoshi Masahiko; December 9, 1939 – September 13, 2023), better known by his stage name Ichikawa Ennosuke III (三代目 市川 猿之助, Sandaime Ichikawa Ennosuke; Japanese pronunciation: [i.tɕi̥.kaꜜ.wa (|) en.no.sɯ̥.ke]), was a Japanese kabuki actor, famous for his love of keren (stage tricks). He was considered the king of chūnori; he flew out over the audience, held aloft on strings, over 5000 times.

== Biography ==
Ennosuke made his stage debut at the age of eight, at the Tōkyō Gekijō, as Ichikawa Danko III. He would formally take the name Ennosuke in 1963, at the age of 24. He is the brother of Ichikawa Danshirō IV; their father is Danshirō III, and their mother is Sanae Takasugi. Their great-grandfather and grandfather, respectively, were the first and second to be called Ichikawa Ennosuke.

Ennosuke was known as a great proponent of dramatic costumes, flamboyant theater signage, and stage tricks (keren), which are looked down upon by many kabuki connoisseurs as "playing to the gallery" and as distracting from the true dramatic art. Nevertheless, among those who enjoy keren, Ennosuke is quite well regarded. He performed chūnori for the first time in 1968, as the fox in Yoshitsune Senbon Zakura, and for the five thousandth time in 2000, as Guan Yu. He has revived a number of old plays, including Date no Jūyaku (The Ten Roles of Date), in which he played ten roles in one performance, through the use of a number of methods of hayagawari (costume quick-change). Ennosuke also created a more contemporary version of kabuki called the "Super Kabuki" style in 1986.

In November 2003, Ennosuke suffered from symptoms of a stroke, and did not perform for most of the following year. He stopped performing in 2004 and retired under the name of Ichikawa En'no II in 2012. His nephew, Takahiko Kinoshi, previously operating under the stage name Kamejiro II, adopted the Ennosuke stage name to become Ichikawa Ennosuke IV.

His son is the actor Teruyuki Kagawa (better known as Ichikawa Chusha IX, his stage name as a Kabuki actor).

Ichikawa En'ō II died from arrhythmia in Tokyo, on September 13, 2023, at the age of 83.
