= One Piece season 14 =

Season of television series

One Piece
- Season 14; Marineford
- The cover of the first DVD compilation released by Avex Mode of the fourteenth season.
- No. of episodes: 60

Release
- Original network: Fuji Television
- Original release: June 27, 2010 – September 25, 2011

Season chronology
- ← Previous; Season 13 Next → Season 15

The fourteenth season of the One Piece anime series was produced by Toei Animation, and directed by Hiroaki Miyamoto. The season began broadcasting in Japan on Fuji Television on June 27, 2010, and ended on September 25, 2011. The season focuses on Monkey D. Luffy as he, Impel Down's escaped prisoners and Whitebeard's pirates goes to the Marineford to save his adoptive older brother Portgas D. Ace from the execution. It contains two story arcs. The first is titled "Marineford" (マリンフォード, Marinfōdo), which mainly adapts the 56th to 59th volumes of the material from the One Piece manga by Eiichiro Oda. The second story arc, which is also titled "Post-War" (戦後, Sengo), also adapts material from the 59th to 61st volumes of the manga.

The season deals with the war between the Marines and Whitebeard's pirates. Focusing on Luffy, Jimbei, and the escaped convicts from Impel Down as they infiltrate Marineford with the help of Whitebeard's pirates to save Ace from the execution. Eventually, Luffy must decide on whether to continue training in two years or go back to Sabaody to see his friends once again. The first DVD compilation was released on October 5, 2011.

The season used three pieces of theme music. The first opening theme, titled "Kaze o Sagashite" (風をさがして; lit. 'Search for the Wind') and performed by Mari Yaguchi with the Straw Hats, continues to be used for the first two episodes. The second opening theme, from episodes 459 to 492, is "One Day" performed by The Rootless. The third opening theme, from episodes 493 to 516, is "Fight Together" performed by Namie Amuro.

== Episodes ==
No. overall	No. in season	Title	Directed by	Written by	Original release date
Marineford
457	1	"A Special Retrospective Before Marineford! The Vow of the Brotherhood"; Transliteration: "Marinfōdo Chokuzen Kaisou Supesharu – Kyōdai no Chikai!" (Japanese: 海軍本部直前回想特別編 兄弟の誓い!)	Makoto Sonoda	Hirohiko Kamisaka	June 27, 2010
Monkey D. Luffy recalls his childhood with Portgas D. Ace, meeting him again in Alabasta and receiving his Vivre card, meeting Blackbeard without knowing who he was, hearing the news about Ace's execution, and confronting Blackbeard in Impel Down. Ace, awaiting his execution in Marineford, recalls his encounter with Blackbeard.
458	2	"A Special Retrospective Before Marineford! The Three Navy Admirals Come Together!"; Transliteration: "Marinfōdo Chokuzen Kaisou Supesharu – Shūketsu! San Taishō" (Japanese: 海軍本部直前回想特別編 集結! 三大将)	Hiroyuki Satō	Hirohiko Kamisaka	July 11, 2010
Around three hours before the execution, the five Warlords present for the battle and three Marine Admirals move to their positions to await Whitebeard's attack, and flashbacks of them are shown. At this time, the guards arrive to retrieve Ace and take him to the scaffold.
459	3	"Ticking Down to the Time of Battle! The Navy's Strongest Lineup in Position!"; Transliteration: "Kessen no Toki Semaru! Kaigun Saikyō no Fujin Kansei!" (Japanese: 決戦の刻迫る! 海軍最強の布陣完成!)	Hiroaki Miyamoto	Yoshiyuki Suga	July 18, 2010
Ace reaches the scaffold in Marineford, where the Marines assemble for Whitebeard's assault. Meanwhile, Luffy's ship approaches the Gates of Justice, blocking his path through Marineford. After Ace finally reaches the execution platform, Marine Fleet Admiral Sengoku asks who his biological father is, but Ace insists that Whitebeard is his father. However, Sengoku reveals to the world via Transponder Snail that Ace's biological mother is Portgas D. Rouge, who had him inside her womb for 20 months and he took his mother's surname to become a pirate himself. He also reveals that Ace's biological father is the King of the Pirates, Gold Roger, much to the horror of Ace, the Marines, the reporters and the world.
460	4	"A Vast Fleet Appears! Here Come the Whitebeard Pirates!"; Transliteration: "Kyodai Kantai Arawaru – Shūrai! Shirohige Kaizoku-dan" (Japanese: 巨大艦隊あらわる 襲来! 白ひげ海賊団)	Takahiro Imamura	Hitoshi Tanaka	August 1, 2010
While the Marines are waiting for Whitebeard's assault and Ace's execution, Monkey D. Garp has a flashback: months before Gol D. Roger was executed, he reveals to Garp that he is having a child and told Garp to look over the child. The Marines search for any people who are connected to Roger. Portgas D. Rouge, Ace's mother and Roger's lover, keeps the child inside her womb months after his execution. However, after Rouge gives birth to the child, a boy whom she names Gol D. Ace, she dies of exhaustion. Soon after, Ace is raised by Garp and Dadan. Garp also introduces Luffy to Ace and they befriended each other. During Sengoku's execution speech, he receives word that the Gates of Justice has been opened without an order, allowing Luffy's ship to pass through. After Whitebeard's fleet appears for the assault, the Moby Dick appears from underwater in front of the execution platform.
461	5	"The Beginning of the War! Ace and Whitebeard's Past!"; Transliteration: "Kessen no Makuake! Ēsu to Shirohige no Kako" (Japanese: 決戦の幕開け! エースと白ひげの過去)	Directed by : Sumio Watanabe; Storyboarded by : Naoyuki Itō	Hitoshi Tanaka	August 8, 2010
Whitebeard reveals his Devil Fruit powers in front of the Marines. Whitebeard and Ace's past are shown: Ace was the captain of the Spade Pirates. Ace confronts Jimbei to meet Whitebeard since Ace turned down an offer to become a Warlord. Soon after Whitebeard offered Ace to join his crew when his battle has ended, Ace attempted to kill Whitebeard to no avail. Whitebeard allowed Ace to become a division commander. However, when Blackbeard turned against the crew and killed Thatch, Ace left Whitebeard on a mission to capture Blackbeard. When Ace tells Whitebeard on the execution platform that he ignored his advice, Whitebeard says that he was the one who sent Ace to confront Blackbeard when he originally told him not to go, to cover Ace's mistake in his rescue attempt.
462	6	"The Force That Could Destroy the World! The Power of the Tremor-Tremor Fruit!"; Transliteration: "Sekai o Horobosu Chikara! Gura Gura no Mi no Nōryoku" (Japanese: 世界を滅ぼす力! グラグラの実の能力)	Yoshihiro Ueda	Yoshiyuki Suga	August 15, 2010
Whitebeard and his allies declare to the Marines and the Warlords their determination to rescue Ace, while Luffy and his group continue to reach Marineford. A tsunami approaches Marineford on both sides as a result of Whitebeard's Tremor-Tremor Fruit abilities. However, Aokiji stops the two waves with his Ice-Ice abilities by freezing them and the central bay. The Whitebeard division commanders leap into action, as do the Vice-Admirals. Mihawk then steps up and launches a large slash attack towards Whitebeard.
463	7	"An All-Consuming Inferno!! Admiral Akainu's Power!"; Transliteration: "Subete o Yakitsukusu!! Taishō Akainu no Chikara!" (Japanese: すべてを焼き尽くす!! 大将赤犬の能力!)	Yutaka Nakashima	Hirohiko Kamisaka	August 22, 2010
Jozu manages to withstand Mihawk's slash with his Devil Fruit power, which turns his body into diamond. Kizaru attempts to attack Whitebeard, but Marco blocks the attack by turning into a phoenix with his Devil Fruit power, and knocks Kizaru back. Jozu digs out a large chunk of the ice and tosses it toward the Marines, but Akainu melts it with his magma-based Devil Fruit power. Akainu counterattacks with his power, sinking one of Whitebeard's ships, but Whitebeard effortlessly extinguishes the magma. While the Marines and the Whitebeard pirates fight on the ice, Koby and Helmeppo start becoming scared, as many Marines more powerful than they have been taken down easily. Little Oars Jr., a descendant of the original Oars steps forward to force his way through the Marine defenses and save Ace, whom he views as a close friend.
464	8	"A Descendant of the Beast! Little Oars Jr. - Full Speed Ahead!"; Transliteration: "Majin no Shison! Ritoru Ōzu Junia Bakushin!" (Japanese: 魔人の子孫! リトルオーズJr.驀進！)	Katsumi Tokoro	Hitoshi Tanaka	August 29, 2010
Oars Jr. forces his way into the plaza, overturning one of the Marine ships and defeating the Giant Unit, enabling the Whitebeard Pirates to advance. He continues despite Ace's protests that he is too large of a target and recalls the time Ace made him a hat that protected him from the weather. Kuma blasts Oars Jr. with Ursus Shock, Doflamingo cuts off his leg, and Moria impales him with Spiky Shadow Lizard, causing him to collapse while trying to reach out to Ace.
465	9	"Justice For the Winners! Sengoku's Strategy in Action!"; Transliteration: "Shōsha dake ga Seigi – Hatsudō! Sengoku no Sakusen" (Japanese: 勝者だけが正義 発動! センゴクの作戦)	Aya Komaki	Yoshiyuki Suga	September 5, 2010
Oars Jr. tries to reach towards Ace, but is unable to and falls down. Vice Admiral Ronse launched a sneak attack at Whitebeard, but was easily defeated by a quake punch. Whitebeard ordered his soldiers to storm the plaza. Koby and Helmeppo run inside Marinefold to escape the battle, but witness Akainu kill a marine for doing so. Sengoku tells the strategy of forgetting about the time and executing Ace to all the marines, and Koby and Helmeppo also hear it. They witness something falling from the sky, which happens to be Luffy and the escaped prisoners from Impel Down.
466	10	"Straw Hat Team Arrives! Tension Grows at the Battlefield"; Transliteration: "Mugiwara Chīmu Tōchaku – Fūunkyū o Tsugeru Senjō" (Japanese: 麦わらチーム到着 風雲急を告げる戦場)	Gō Koga	Hirohiko Kamisaka	September 12, 2010
In a flashback, the tsunami Whitebeard created rushes toward Luffy's Marine ship. They attempt to ride the wave, but become stuck on the top when Aokiji freezes it. After hearing a report that Ace's execution will happen early, they attempt to break free, but fall into the hole Jozu created. Luffy checks to see that Ace is still alive, then stops Crocodile from attacking Whitebeard. Whitebeard notices that Luffy has "Red-Haired" Shanks's hat, and Luffy, unfazed by Whitebeard's power or reputation, tells him that he will rescue Ace and become the King of the Pirates.
467	11	"Even If It Means Death! Luffy vs. the Navy; The Battle Starts!"; Transliteration: "Shindemo Tasukeru – Rufi VS Kaigun Batoru Sutāto" (Japanese: 死んでも助ける ルフィVS海軍戦闘開始)	Naoyuki Itō	Hitoshi Tanaka	September 19, 2010
Luffy charges forward to save Ace, fighting off the marines in the way. Admiral Kizaru attacks him with a beam of light, but Ivankov saves him, only to be attacked by Kuma, whom he claims to know. Luffy encounters Jango and Fullbody; Jango accidentally hypnotizes himself and Fullbody, and Luffy barely escapes from Hina using Second Gear. Elsewhere, the Whitebeard Pirates are having difficulty getting past the Vice Admirals and Squard attempts to sneak past, only to encounter someone. Moria attacks with a group of zombies, halting Luffy's progress, while Marine reinforcements enter. Ace yells that Luffy must not try to save him, saying that he cannot bear to be saved by a weakling while actually not wanting Luffy to die. However, Luffy tells him he does not care and will save Ace even if he dies. As Jimbei arrives, defeating Moria's zombies with a blast of salt water and Luffy defeats a giant officer with Third Gear, Sengoku reveals to the Marines and the world that Luffy is Ace's adoptive brother and the Revolutionary Monkey D. Dragon's biological son.
468	12	"Hard Battles, One After Another! Devil Fruit Eaters vs. Devil Fruit Eaters!"; Transliteration: "Gekisen no Renzoku! Nōryokusha Gundan VS Nōryokusha Gundan" (Japanese: 激戦の連続! 能力者軍団VS能力者軍団)	Makoto Sonoda	Yoshiyuki Suga	September 26, 2010
Ace is still upset that the Whitebeard Pirates and even Luffy are still trying to save him but decides to accept whether he lives or dies. Whitebeard tricks Buggy into helping him, noting that despite being weak, he has powerful followers who could pose a threat. Whitebeard, sensing that the Marines have a plan when the forces in front of them fall back, orders the ships under his command to attack the Marine ships flanking him. Jimbei fights with Moria and defeats him even when he steals several shadows to increase his power. Smoker attacks Luffy and manages to pin him down, but Boa Hancock, angered by him attacking his beloved Luffy, attacks him and manages to kick him despite his Logia powers with her Haki. Ivankov encounters Kuma, saying they knew each other. However, Doflamingo reveals to Ivankov that the Kuma he knew is dead.
469	13	"Kuma's Transformation! Ivan-san's Blow of Anger!"; Transliteration: "Kuma ni Okita Ihen – Iwa-san Ikari no Ichigeki" (Japanese: クマに起きた異変 イワさん怒りの一撃)	Yoshihiro Ueda	Hirohiko Kamisaka	October 3, 2010
Doflamingo tells Ivankov that Kuma had slowly been modified into a Pacifista over time, and a few days ago, had his brain replaced, completely losing his personality and free will in the process, causing Luffy to realize what Kuma meant back at Sabaody when he said that they'll never meet again. Luffy receives the key to Ace's handcuffs from Hancock and happily hugs her in thankfull, for which Hancock faints and fantasizes about their wedding ceremony. Ivankov fights against Kuma while Luffy continues to advance up the battlefield. Crocodile defeats a myriad of Whitebeard's lower-ranking men to reach him, but is assaulted by Jozu, who is then halted by Doflamingo. Mihawk then steps up to block Luffy's path to the execution platform.
470	14	"The Great Swordsman Mihawk! Luffy Comes Under the Attack of the Black Sword!"; Transliteration: "Kengō Mihōku – Rufi ni Semaru Kokutō no Zangeki" (Japanese: 剣豪ミホーク ルフィに迫る黒刀の斬撃)	Takahiro Imamura	Yoshiyuki Suga	October 10, 2010
Mihawk begins attacking Luffy while Hancock and Ivankov are occupied, easily defeating two of the New Kamas who arrive to assist him and knocking Jimbei aside. Luffy escapes by using Buggy as a shield and fifth division leader Vista arrives to fight Mihawk. Buggy and his followers manage to obtain one of the Transponder Snails as part of his plan to become famous. Sengoku orders that the links to the Transponder Snails be cut so that the world will only know that the Marines won. An army of Pacifistas, led by Sentomaru, attacks the Whitebeard Pirates from behind.
471	15	"The Extermination Strategy in Action! The Power of the Pacifistas!"; Transliteration: "Senmetsu Sakusen Shidō – Pashifisuta Gundan no Iryoku" (Japanese: 殲滅作戦始動 パシフィスタ軍団の威力)	Yutaka Nakashima	Hitoshi Tanaka	October 17, 2010
The Pacifistas approach from behind, defeating the Whitebeard Pirates in their path, but the plan is not fully effective because of Whitebeard attacking the ships at the sides. The Marines withdraw to the plaza, intending to raise the fortification wall and execute Ace before finishing off the Whitebeard Pirates, and Luffy and the division leaders rush to reach Ace before then. Sengoku orders all the Transponder Snails to stop broadcasting, but the one Buggy stole continues to broadcast images of the war as he tries to make himself famous. Squard, one of Whitebeard's pirate allies who had been missing for some time, stabs Whitebeard through the chest with his sword.
472	16	"Akainu's Plot! Whitebeard Entrapped!"; Transliteration: "Akainu no Bōryaku! Otoshiirerareta Shirohige" (Japanese: 赤犬の謀略! おとしいれられた白ひげ)	Sumio Watanabe	Hirohiko Kamisaka	October 24, 2010
Squard's stabbing of Whitebeard shocks the Whitebeard pirates, as does his statement that Whitebeard agreed to sacrifice his allies to save Ace. As the Whitebeard pirates question Whitebeard and become demoralized, the Marines gain the upper hand and Aokiji freezes Buggy, cutting the Transponder Snail footage. Whitebeard chastises Squard for falling for the Marines' lies, but forgives him. He opens a path for his men to escape, telling them to follow him if they are prepared to give their lives. As their faith in him is restored, Whitebeard then jumps into the fray, determined to save Ace even if he dies doing so.
473	17	"The Encircling Walls Activated! The Whitebeard Pirates Backed into a Corner!!"; Transliteration: "Hōi Sakusen Sadō! Shirohige Kaizoku-dan Zettaizetsumei!!" (Japanese: 包囲壁作動! 白ひげ海賊団絶体絶命!!)	Hiroaki Miyamoto	Hitoshi Tanaka	October 31, 2010
In a desperate attempt to stop Whitebeard from advancing to the execution platform, the Marines activate walls to block Whitebeard's path, but is stopped by the ice. Squard realizes his error in Whitebeard's stabbing and bursts into tears, but Marco comforts him. Meanwhile, Luffy and his allies charge to the execution platform and the Marines attack them to no avail. Whitebeard confronts John Giant, and defeats him with a punch to the chest. Luffy uses his arms to reach Ace, but the Marines activate the walls and stops Luffy. However, it could not move Oars Jr.'s body. Akainu uses his Meteor Volcano attack to melt the ice in an attempt to prevent Whitebeard's pirates from reaching Ace, much to Luffy's big horror.
474	18	"Execution Order Issued! Break Through the Encircling Walls!"; Transliteration: "Shokei Shikkō Meirei Kudaru – Hōiheki o Toppaseyo!" (Japanese: 処刑執行命令下る 包囲壁を突破せよ!)	Aya Komaki	Yoshiyuki Suga	November 7, 2010
Akainu's Meteor Volcano melts the nearly all the ice and destroys the Whitebeard Pirates' ships, dropping them into boiling water, enabling the cannons on the wall to bombard them while the Pacifistas block the way out. The hole left open by Little Oars Jr.'s body is vulnerable, and Luffy and some of the Whitebeard Pirates try to break through, but are forced back. Sengoku prepares to have Ace executed now that the Whitebeard Pirates cannot save him or escape, but Oars Jr. regains consciousness. Jimbei launches Luffy over the wall, and he begins to fight the three admirals as Whitebeard decides to play his "trump card".
475	19	"Moving Into the Final Phase! Whitebeard's Trump Card for Recovery!"; Transliteration: "Saishū Kyokumen Totsunyū! Shirohige Kishikaisei no Itte" (Japanese: 最終局面突入! 白ひげ起死回生の一手)	Katsumi Tokoro	Hirohiko Kamisaka	November 14, 2010
Luffy attempts to slip past the Admirals, but Kizaru easily catches up to him and knocks him to the ground. The executioners prepare to execute Ace, but Crocodile intervenes, saying he can kill Whitebeard later and he does not want the Marines to win. Aokiji attacks Luffy, but Marco knocks him away before he can finish him off. Mr. 3 hides in the passageways below Marineford, having managed to escape Aokiji's freezing. The Whitebeard pirates rush toward the opening in the wall, prompting the Marine forces to fire their cannons at them, but Whitebeard commands a submerged paddle ship to surface, and Oars Jr. propels it into the plaza with the pirates on board. As Whitebeard's forces reach the plaza, Sengoku and Garp prepare to fight them.
476	20	"Luffy at the End of his Tether! An All-Out Battle at the Oris Plaza!"; Transliteration: "Rufi Chikaratsuku! Orisu Hiroba no Sōryokusen!!" (Japanese: ルフィ力尽く! オリス広場の総力戦!!)	Yoshihiro Ueda	Hitoshi Tanaka	November 21, 2010
Whitebeard attacks the Marines in the plaza, and Aokiji comes to fight him until third division Leader Jozu arrives to handle him. Luffy comes under attack from two vice admirals and Kizaru, then collapses from his injuries and exhaustion. Whitebeard tells Luffy to stay out of the rest of the battle, but admires his persistence. The battle continues as Akainu engages Whitebeard, the allied pirates arrive to help Whitebeard's pirates, and the Pacifistas arrive to fight them. Marco flies up to rescue Ace, but Garp knocks him back and declares that anyone trying to rescue Ace will need to kill him first.
477	21	"The Power That Will Shorten One's Life! Energy Hormone, Redux!"; Transliteration: "Inochi o Kezuru Chikara – Tenshon Horumon Futatabi" (Japanese: 命を削る力 テンション・ホルモン再び)	Naoyuki Itō	Yoshiyuki Suga	November 28, 2010
Ace thinks back to his childhood, when he fought with anyone who spoke ill of Roger and wondering if he should ever have been born. In the present, he's touched by everyone fighting for him and tearfully realizes that he wants to live. Buggy comes to after recovering from being frozen, and notices that Mr. 3 is gone. Whitebeard doubles over in pain while fighting Akainu, enabling Akainu to severely injure him and distracting Marco and Jozu long enough for them to be injured by Kizaru and Aokiji. Luffy asks for Ivankov to give him Tension Hormones as a final request to enable him to fight again and save Ace. Ivankov refuses, saying that it will likely kill him, but Luffy responds by saying that he would rather die than fail to save Ace, causing Ivankov to agree, restoring Luffy's energy. Koby, despite being afraid earlier and Helmeppo's advice to stay out now that the Marines are almost certain to win, goes out to fight.
478	22	"To Live Up to a Promise! Luffy and Coby Collide!"; Transliteration: "Yakusoku no Tame ni!! Gekitotsu! Rufi to Kobī" (Japanese: 約束のために!! 激突! ルフィとコビー)	Gō Koga	Hirohiko Kamisaka	December 5, 2010
Ivankov warns Luffy that the hormones are only fooling his body and he will not be able to get up if he falls again, before the two advance, fighting the Marines in their way. Koby tries to stop Luffy, but Luffy defeats him almost instantly. Luffy encounters more Pacifistas, but Hancock stands in their way to allow him to advance. Jozu and Marco are defeated by Kizaru and Aokiji. Whitebeard receives even more injuries from the Marines, but fights on for the sake of his men. The executioners try to execute Ace again, but Luffy incapacitates them with his too powerful Conqueror's Haki.
479	23	"The Scaffold at Last! The Way to Ace Has Opened!"; Transliteration: "Shokeidai Mokuzen! Hirakareta Ēsu e no Michi!!" (Japanese: 処刑台目前! 開かれたエースへの道!!)	Makoto Sonoda	Hitoshi Tanaka	December 12, 2010
After Luffy unleashes his Haki, the Marines move to eliminate him, seeing the future potential threat he poses, and Whitebeard orders his men to back him up, wanting to see what he will bring about in the future. Crocodile and Hancock attack Luffy's enemies as he advances toward the scaffold. Buggy tries to thaw out the transponder snail in order to continue broadcasting to the world. Ivankov lets Inazuma out of his hair to make a bridge for Luffy to use to reach Ace, but Garp moves out to fight his grandson, saying that he is a Marine Vice Admiral and Luffy is a pirate.
480	24	"Each on Different Paths! Luffy vs. Garp!"; Transliteration: "Sorezore no Eranda Michi – Rufi vs Gāpu!" (Japanese: それぞれの選んだ道 ルフィVSガープ!)	Takahiro Imamura	Yoshiyuki Suga	December 19, 2010
Garp faces off with Luffy and thinks back to when he trained him so that he could become a Marine and stay on the right path. Luffy and Garp throw punches at each other, but Garp hesitates and Luffy knocks him off the bridge, defeating him. Luffy reaches Ace, but Kizaru destroys his key with a beam of light and Sengoku transforms into a giant golden Buddhawith. Mr. 3, disguised as an executioner, comes to the rescue, and uses his powers to create a copy of the key and unlock Ace's shackles as the platform collapses and the Marines open fire on Luffy and Ace. Ace, now released, uses his Flame-Flame Fruit powers to protect Luffy and Mr. 3 from the barrage.
481	25	"Ace Rescued! Whitebeard's Final Order!"; Transliteration: "Ēsu Kyūshutsu! Shirohige Saigo no Senchō Meirei!" (Japanese: エース救出! 白ひげ最後の船長命令!)	Yutaka Nakashima	Hirohiko Kamisaka	December 26, 2010
Luffy and Ace work up to fight off the Marines as the Whitebeard pirates move to escape. Some of the Marines are demoralized, but Akainu and Aokiji are determined to prevent the Whitebeard Pirates from leaving. Squard attempts to hold off the Marines to allow their escape and atone for stabbing Whitebeard. Whitebeard, however, decides to remain behind, not wanting any of his crew to die for him. He says that he is a remnant of the old era and that the time has come for a new one to arrive.
482	26	"The Power That Can Burn Even Fire! Akainu's Ruthless Pursuit!"; Transliteration: "Hi o mo Yakitsukusu Chikara – Akainu Hijō no Tsuigeki" (Japanese: 火をも焼き尽くす能力 赤犬非情の追撃)	Yoshihiro Ueda	Yoshiyuki Suga	January 9, 2011
Whitebeard's final order leaves his pirates distraught as they leave Marineford for the New World. Meanwhile, Buggy uses a transponder snail and does a public broadcast on the Sabaody Archipelago, angering witnesses. When Akainu mocks Whitebeard, saying that he will not surpass Roger, Ace is provoked. Despite his crew's objections, Ace confronts him, but is incapacitated and his vivre card is exposed as Akainu reveals that his Mag-Mag Fruit powers can extinguish fire. Despite Jimbei's objections, Luffy tries to get Ace's vivre card. Akainu launches a powerful attack at Luffy, but Ace jumps in the way at the last second to shield Luffy from his attack. Luffy watches in horror as Ace's vivre card is finally burned up.
483	27	"Looking for the Answer! Fire Fist Ace Dies on the Battlefield!"; Transliteration: "Kotae o Sagashite – Hiken no Ēsu Senjō ni Shisu" (Japanese: 答えを探して 火拳のエース戦場に死す)	Hiroaki Miyamoto	Hirohiko Kamisaka	January 16, 2011
Akainu's attack against Ace gives him only seconds to live. Akainu tries to attack Ace again, but Jimbei blocks it, and Marco, freed from his handcuffs by Mr. 3, arrives with Vista to assist him. Garp is angered by Akainu's actions, but Sengoku holds him down. A dying Ace apologizes to Luffy for not letting him to be rescued properly and for not being able to see him achieve his dream. He tells Luffy that he wanted to know whether someone like him deserved to be born. Before Ace dies, he thanks Luffy, Whitebeard and his crewmates for loving him despite who he is. Ace's death shatters Luffy's spirit as he cries and screams in despair.
484	28	"The Navy Headquarters Falls! Whitebeard's Unspeakable Wrath!"; Transliteration: "Kaigun Honbu Hōkai! Shirohige Kotobanaki Ikari!" (Japanese: 海軍本部崩壊! 白ひげ言葉なき怒り!)	Aya Komaki	Hitoshi Tanaka	January 23, 2011
After witnessing the death of Ace by Akainu, Luffy becomes completely incapacitated. Akainu then attempts to kill Luffy, but Marco fights him to protect Luffy, and Jimbei flees with him. Enraged at the death of Ace, Whitebeard ruthlessly attacks Akainu and creates a massive earthquake that severely damages Marine Headquarters and leaves him isolated from his men. The Blackbeard Pirates, having acquired several notorious criminals from the lowest level of Impel Down, then make their appearance, with Blackbeard having come to witness Whitebeard's death.
485	29	"Ending the Matter! Whitebeard vs. The Blackbeard Pirates!"; Transliteration: "Kejime o Tsukeru – Shirohige VS Kurohige Kaizoku-dan" (Japanese: ケジメをつける 白ひげVS黒ひげ海賊団)	Katsumi Tokoro	Hirohiko Kamisaka	January 30, 2011
Blackbeard reveals that the entire reason he wanted to become one of the Seven Warlords of the Sea was to gain access to Impel Down, and that he gained entrance by having Laffitte hypnotize the Marines in control of the Gates of Justice to allow all Marine ships, which also enabled Luffy's ship to gain entry. Whitebeard attacks Blackbeard to avenge Thatch, whom Blackbeard had killed to get the Dark-Dark Fruit. Blackbeard uses his Dark-Dark Fruit powers to cancel out Whitebeard's Tremor-Tremor Fruit powers, but Whitebeard gains the upper hand, only to be attacked and mortally wounded by the rest of Blackbeard's crew. With his final words, Whitebeard tells Blackbeard that he will not be the one to find the One Piece, and reveals that Ace may have died, but others with the Will of D have inherited Roger's will and confirms the real existence of the "One Piece" in front of the Marines and the world. As his crew mourns their captain, Whitebeard bids farewell to his sons and dies standing up, with hundreds of wounds on his body, but not a single one on his back.
486	30	"The Show Begins! Blackbeard's Plot is Revealed!"; Transliteration: "Shō no Kaimaku – Akasareta Kurohige no Takurami" (Japanese: ショーの開幕 明かされた黒ひげの企み)	Naoyuki Itō	Yoshiyuki Suga	February 6, 2011
News of Whitebeards's death spreads across the world, and many people are excited to hear of the demise of one of the world's most powerful pirates. The Whitebeard Pirates attempt to flee, but Akainu, having survived Whitebeard's assault, emerges in front of Jimbei. Jimbei, having grown to like Luffy, refuses to hand him over, and Ivankov, Inazuma, and a few of the Whitebeard Pirates arrive to assist him as Hancock holds off the Pacifistas. Meanwhile, Blackbeard throws a cloth over himself and Whitebeard's body, and emerges with the ability to use both his Dark-Dark Fruit power and Whitebeard's Tremor-Tremor Fruit power. As those assembled watch in horror, he declares that his era has begun.
487	31	"The Insatiable Akainu! Lava Fists Pummel Luffy!"; Transliteration: "Akainu no Shūnen! Rufi o Osou Maguma no Kobushi" (Japanese: 赤犬の執念! ルフィを襲うマグマの拳)	Gō Koga	Hitoshi Tanaka	February 13, 2011
Blackbeard expresses his desire to sink Marineford into the ocean after destroying the fortress, but Sengoku attacks him, saying that the island is a symbol of justice in the world. The Marines continue to pursue and kill the retreating Whitebeard Pirates, and Koby begins hearing the combatants' voices in his head. Akainu defeats Inazuma and Ivankov, then chases down Jimbei and punches through his chest, severely injuring both him and Luffy. The two fall to the ice below, but Crocodile attacks Akainu and launches Luffy into the air, where Buggy catches him. Crocodile and Whitebeard's division commanders fight Akainu to cover Luffy's escape. Just as Buggy desperately tries to escape, Trafalgar Law arrives in his submarine. Law says that Luffy will become his enemy one day, but as that is a worthwhile relationship, he will give him medical treatment.
488	32	"The Desperate Scream! Courageous Moments That Will Change the Future"; Transliteration: "Hisshi no Sakebi – Unmei o Kaeru Yūki aru Sūbyō" (Japanese: 必死の叫び 運命を変える勇気ある数秒)	Yoshihiro Ueda	Yoshiyuki Suga	February 20, 2011
The fighting between the pirates and the Marines continues as Sengoku and Garp fight Blackbeard, and the Marines are determined to eliminate the fleeing Whitebeard pirates. Kizaru attacks in an attempt to prevent Law from escaping with Luffy and Jimbei. Koby, having developed the ability to sense the voices of those fighting, becomes overwhelmed by all the violence, and screams that fighting is unnecessary and only risks the lives of many soldiers who have families. Akainu tries to kill him, but Luffy's childhood idol and one of Four Emperors Shanks arrives, blocks his attack, and reveals that he has come to end the summit war.
489	33	"Here Comes Shanks! The War of the Best is Finally Over!"; Transliteration: "Shankusu Kenzan! Chōjō Sensō Tsuini Shūketsu" (Japanese: シャンクス見参! 頂上戦争ついに終結)	Yutaka Nakashima	Hitoshi Tanaka	March 6, 2011
Shanks tricks Buggy into returning Luffy's straw hat to him, noting that while he would like to see Luffy again, it is too soon for their reunion. Law's submarine barely escapes from Aokiji and Kizaru's attacks, and Kizaru declares that they will have to give up if that did not kill Luffy. Hancock requests a Marine ship to go after Luffy out of concern for him. Shanks convinces the Marines, the Whitebeard Pirates, and the Blackbeard Pirates to stand down by saying that fighting will only lead to more casualties, and declaring that he will fight those who still wish to do so. All those involved agree, and the Summit War of Marineford finally ends.
Post-War
490	34	"Mighty Leaders Face Each Other Down! Heralding the "New Era"!"; Transliteration: "Gun'yūkakkyosu! "Atarashī Jidai" no Hajimari!" (Japanese: 群雄割拠す! "新しい時代"の始まり!)	Directed by : Takahiro Imamura; Storyboarded by : Naotoshi Shida	Hirohiko Kamisaka	March 20, 2011
The public celebrates the end of the Summit War of Marineford around the world. Meanwhile, in Marineford, Sengoku is being told that Blackbeard released the Impel Down inmates to join his crew earlier. Sengoku is enraged by Blackbeard and the World Government, which doesn't want to see its reputation being damaged any more and therefore orders to withhold the news that more prisoners from Level 6 have escaped from Impel Down. In the sea, Law's submarine surfaces near a Marine ship with Hancock on board. Law tells her that even though Luffy has been stabilized, he also suffered severe injuries from the battle. Ivankov and the Newkamas reveal that Luffy could not stand up in Impel Down because of his condition at that time. Ivankov also says that Luffy pushed himself to save Ace, much to Hancock's big sadness. Jimbei, now partially recovered, appears despite being told to rest. Jimbei tells everyone that he cannot stop worrying once Luffy wakes up. Hancock orders Law's crew to call the Kuja's ship and return to Amazon Lily.
491	35	"Landing at the Maiden Island! The Harsh Reality Falls Upon Luffy!"; Transliteration: "Nyōgashima Jōriku – Rufi o Semeru Kakoku na Genjitsu" (Japanese: 女ヶ島上陸 ルフィを責める過酷な現実)	Directed by : Makoto Sonoda; Storyboarded by : Eisaku Inoue	Yoshiyuki Suga	March 27, 2011
As a result of Whitebeard's death, pirates over the world attack islands while heading to the Grand Line, while islands formally under Whitebeard's protection fall under siege. Meanwhile, the Kuja's pirate ship arrives and escorts Law and his crew to the Maiden Island. Ivankov says goodbye to everyone, agreeing with Jimbei that meeting each other was an interesting experience that might never have happened if it were not for Luffy. Later, Hancock and the Heart Pirates arrive at Maiden Island, where the Heart Pirates are nearly killed before Hancock explains why they are here. However, Nyon tells Hancock that the tribe cannot accept men on their island, but lets the Heart Pirates stay in a small bay on the island while Luffy recovers. Two weeks later, Luffy finally wakes up from his coma and goes berserk. Upon hearing Luffy has woken up, Hancock orders food to be made for him (mostly so she can go and see him), despite not having eaten anything herself in the past two weeks. As a rampage Luffy destroys the jungle, Jimbei discovers Luffy in a state of depression from realizing he is not dreaming, and that Ace really is dead. Luffy sheds tears and screams Ace's name.
Toriko x One Piece Collaboration Special
492	36	"The Strongest Tag-Team! Luffy and Toriko's Hard Struggle!"; Transliteration: "Saikyō Taggu! Funtō, Rufi to Toriko!" (Japanese: 最強タッグ! 奮闘、ルフィとトリコ!)	Naoyuki Itō	Isao Murayama	April 3, 2011 (Note: This episode aired as the second half of a one hour TV Special alongside Toriko. In North America, it was skipped during Funimation's simulcast and subsequently released by Crunchyroll on October 18, 2014.)
Toriko and the Straw Hats follow the assailant's tracks and set out to rescue their comrades, Nami and Komatsu. Along the way, they face a fierce group of lions, but are aided by Toriko's allies: Sunny, Coco & Rin. They find their friends being held captive on a mountain by a group of mammals called Cocoalas. Luffy and Toriko defeat the Cocoalas together, rescue their friends and discover that the mountain itself is made of a delicious fruit that was rumored to reside there. Later, an eruption occurs which reveals the entire island to be one giant dessert. After Luffy and Toriko gorge on the dessert island, the Straw Hat crew gathers the provisions they need and sets off on their journey, as Toriko continues his search for his Full Course Menu. Note: This episode concludes a crossover which began in Episode 1 of Toriko. Due to licensing restrictions, Funimation skipped this episode in every official release.
Post-War
493	37	"Luffy and Ace! The Story of How the Brothers Met!"; Transliteration: "Rufi to Ēsu – Kyōdai no Deai no Monogatari!" (Japanese: ルフィとエース 兄弟の出会いの物語!)	Aya Komaki	Hitoshi Tanaka	April 10, 2011
A flashback of Luffy's life is shown. Ten years before Luffy's journey, Garp takes his grandson to Mt. Corvo. While there, they meet mountain bandit Curly Dadan, along with her henchmen Magra and Dogra. Dadan also reveals about Ace who was adopted by her. While in the jungle, Luffy encounters more mountain bandits and eats their meat to his dismay. Dadan tells him that the mountain bandits are a member of her gang known as the Dadan family. She tells Luffy to work for her. Luffy hits Dadan and tells her that he must be strong. Ace walks away and Luffy pursues him. One week later, Dadan finds Luffy and has him sleep with Ace. Luffy continues to pursue Ace in the forests, and interacts with the animals. After two months, Luffy eventually reaches the end of the forest and finds a junkyard covered with fog.
494	38	"Here Comes Sabo! The Boy at the Gray Terminal!"; Transliteration: "Sabo Tōjō! Gurei Tāminaru no Shōnen" (Japanese: サボ登場! 不確かな物の終着駅の少年)	Katsumi Tokoro	Hitoshi Tanaka	April 17, 2011
Luffy discovers the junkyard is named the Gray Terminal. Luffy runs after Ace when he steals the treasure and run into Sabo, a boy who lives there. Luffy discovers the stolen treasure and is tied up. Luffy screams and Porchemy, a member of the Bluejam Pirates, finds them. Luffy, Ace and Sabo escape, but Luffy is captured by Porchemy. Luffy is tortured into asking where the treasure is at, but he refuses to cooperate. Soon Sabo realizing that Luffy would not tell Porchemy about the treasure's whereabouts, Sabo and Ace break into Porchemy's hideout.
495	39	"I Won't Run! Ace's Desperate Rescue Operation!"; Transliteration: "Ore wa Nigenai – Ēsu Kesshi no Kyūshutsu Sakusen" (Japanese: おれは逃げない エース決死の救出作戦)	Yoshihiro Ueda	Hirohiko Kamisaka	April 24, 2011
Sabo and Ace confront Porchemy. When Porchemy asks about Ace's treasure, he refuses to answer and together, Ace tells Sabo to pick up Luffy and make a run while he will be confronting Porchemy. Sabo asks why won't Ace escape with them on which he replies that he never runs away from a fight. Sabo then gets into such a situation, that he leaves Luffy on the ground and decides to fight alongside Ace. Ace and Sabo defeat Porchemy and Luffy is rescued. Later, Bluejam guns down Porchemy for failing to capture the three children. Sabo reveals that the forest is near Dadan's house and together they go there. Dadan allows Sabo, Luffy, and Ace to stay in the forest. During this time, Luffy finally befriends Sabo and Ace.
496	40	"To The Sea Someday! The Pledge of the Three Brats!"; Transliteration: "Itsuka Umi e! San'nin no Akudō Chikai no Sakazuki!" (Japanese: いつか海へ! 三人の悪童ちかいの盃!)	Yutaka Nakashima	Yoshiyuki Suga	May 1, 2011
Luffy's attempt at using the Gum-Gum Pistol technique backfires. Luffy is no match for Ace and Sabo, and is defeated. The three invade Edge Town, a town located just past the Gray Terminal and fight off several bandits. When they go to High Town, the trio disguise themselves, but are discovered. Sabo is seen by a noble, who is tricked before escaping with the others. Back at the forest, Sabo explains to Ace and Luffy that he is the nobleman's son. Sabo explains that the reason he left: his parents made him study and take lessons on culture to marry a princess. Despite his father's objections, Sabo left for the Gray Terminal. Sabo explains that his dream is to live freely on the sea and vows that they will become pirates. Ace reveals that he will become a pirate to become infamous and Luffy reveals his dream of becoming the King of the Pirates. The three become sworn brothers by sharing a drink of sake.
497	41	"Leaving the Dadan Family for Good?! The Kids' Hideout Has Been Built!"; Transliteration: "Dadan Ikka to no Wakare!? Kansei! Himitsu Kichi" (Japanese: ダダン一家との別れ!? 完成! 秘密基地)	Gō Koga	Hitoshi Tanaka	May 8, 2011
Luffy, Sabo, and Ace leave the Dadan Family mainly because they need to hide from Garp, who disapprove of their dreams of becoming pirates and also because of Bluejam and his crew are finding them. They end up building a fort in a large tree. Dadan does come to visit them secretly, showing some compassion, but ends up being attacked by the various traps Sabo set up.
498	42	"Luffy Becoming an Apprentice?! A Man Who Fought Against the King of the Pirates!"; Transliteration: "Rufi Deshi-iri!? Kaizoku-Ō to Tatakatta Otoko!" (Japanese: ルフィ弟子入り!? 海賊王と戦った男!)	Takahiro Imamura	Hirohiko Kamisaka	May 15, 2011
Ace, Sabo, and Luffy chase down a Danpa and succeeds to catch it, but a tiger steals it. Seeking revenge, the three brothers put fish on their back to lure the tiger, but a bear that can match the tiger appears. Ace attacks the bear, but it is angered and chases the three brothers. It is then stopped by a former pirate captain named Naguri using Conqueror's Haki. Sabo reveals that Ace's father is Gold Roger. Ace, however, dislikes his father being mentioned. Meanwhile, Sabo's father goes to Bluejam and tells him that he wants Sabo back. Dadan discusses the visit of a certain world noble with Dogra and Magra.
499	43	"The Battle against the Big Tiger! Who is Going to be Captain?!"; Transliteration: "Ōtora to no Kessen! Senchō ni Naru no wa Dare da!" (Japanese: 大虎との決戦! 船長になるのは誰だ!)	Hiroaki Miyamoto	Hirohiko Kamisaka	May 22, 2011
While Ace and Sabo are chased by the tiger, they encounter Naguri again. The brothers build a ship for Naguri during their training. The three brothers confront the tiger again, and they are nearly defeated. As Sabo distracts the tiger, Luffy uses his Gum-Gum Rocket technique to shoot Ace at the Tiger, finally defeating it. The three brothers see Naguri off. Meanwhile, Bluejam gives the crew a message to Sabo's father that they have found him.
500	44	"Freedom Taken Away! The Nobles' Plot Closing in on the Brothers!"; Transliteration: "Ubawareta Jiyū! Sankyōdai ni Semaru Kizoku no Wana" (Japanese: 奪われた自由! 三兄弟に迫る貴族の罠)	Makoto Sonoda	Yoshiyuki Suga	May 29, 2011
While gathering supplies in the Grey Terminal, Sabo, Luffy and Ace are captured by Bluejam's crew. Sabo's father scolds Ace and Luffy for their involvement with his son and takes him back to High Town. Bluejam takes Luffy and Ace to his hideout and forces the two to take supplies to the Grey Terminal. Meanwhile, at High Town, Sabo learns of the nobles' plan to burn down Gray Terminal from his newly adopted brother Sterry. He also tells Sabo that a group of observers from the World Government will arrive in the Goa Kingdom in three days. Sabo runs away to warn Luffy and Ace. The next day, the nobleman has his family search for Sabo. Sabo is told to keep the arson plan a secret but runs back to Luffy and Ace.
501	45	"The Fire Has Been Set! The Gray Terminal in Crisis!"; Transliteration: "Hanatareta Honō – Gurei Tāminaru no Kiki" (Japanese: 放たれた炎 グレイ・ターミナルの危機)	Yoshihiro Ueda	Hitoshi Tanaka	June 5, 2011
In High Town, Sabo fails to warn his brothers as he is caught by his father. Meanwhile, Bluejam tells Ace and Luffy about the fire at the Gray Terminal. Sabo is detained in a wine cellar, after escaping once again he fails to reach the Gray Terminal. At which point he tells Dragon about the fire and admits that he will never be free as long as he stays in High Town. Bluejam and his crew burn down the Grey Terminal, trapping the people in Goa Kingdom and filling the Dadan family with horror. Bluejam discovers that he was cheated by the Nobles, and confronts Luffy and Ace about his hidden treasure. Ace uses his Haki to knock Bluejam's crew out, but Bluejam threatens to kill Ace with his gun.
502	46	"Where Can Freedom be Found? A Sad Departure of a Boy!"; Transliteration: "Jiyū wa Doko ni Aru? Shōnen no Kanashiki Funade" (Japanese: 自由はどこにある? 少年の悲しき船出)	Katsumi Tokoro	Hirohiko Kamisaka	June 12, 2011
Dadan knocks Bluejam's shot astray and confronts him. Dadan gives Bluejam an ultimatum: he will let Ace go, or Dadan will defeat him. The Dadan Family and Luffy flee, but Ace refuses to run after them. Dadan orders her bandits to take Luffy away. The citizens discover an escape route. On a ship, Ivankov is told by Dragon that the country would be an example of how it would happen in future events. Meanwhile, in High Town, the citizens are left in horror as it burns down. In Mt. Gogo, Luffy is resting and is upset about missing Ace and Sabo. Back in High Town, Sabo decides to live his life alone as a free man. Just as the citizens discovers that Sabo has escaped, Sabo is confronted by Saint Jalmack, a Celestial Dragon, who shoots at his boat.
503	47	"Take Good Care of Him! A Letter from the Brother!"; Transliteration: "Yoroshiku Tanomu! Kyōdai kara Todoita Tegami!" (Japanese: よろしく頼む! 兄弟から届いた手紙!)	Aya Komaki	Yoshiyuki Suga	June 19, 2011
Saint Jalmack shoots at Sabo's boat again, destroying it and killing the sole occupant. Ace and Dadan return to her house much to the relief of Luffy and Dadan's bandits. Ace reveals that not only they have defeated Bluejam, but the fire became too powerful. Dadan made an escape route for Ace, but was burnt in the process. Dogra returns from High Town and tells Ace and the others that Sabo has died. Enraged at the death of the noble, Ace tries to find his killer, but is tied up in the process. The next day, Ace receives Sabo's letter and Luffy becomes upset that his brother has died. Ace eventually convinces Luffy to live freely without any regrets, as the letter tells him to take care of Luffy.
504	48	"To Live Up to the Promise! Departures of Their Own!"; Transliteration: "Yakusoku o Hatasu Tame – Sorezore no Tabidachi!" (Japanese: 約束を果たすため それぞれの旅立ち!)	Yutaka Nakashima	Hitoshi Tanaka	June 26, 2011
After Sabo's death, Ace and Luffy continue their training while the others discover the Revolutionaries' ship. Meanwhile, Dragon tells Ivankov that he has attracted too much attention and departs for Baltigo. At the Grey Terminal, the villagers begin to accumulate more junk. At the forest, Ace becomes more fond of Luffy as a sworn brother when Luffy is nearly mauled by a bear. After seven years of intensive training, Ace departs from the Goa Kingdom to the ocean and Dadan is emotionally distraught. Three more years pass and Luffy bids farewell to everyone as he departs on his journey to the Grand Line. Luffy encounters the Sea King that ate Shanks's arm again and uses the Gum-Gum Pistol technique to defeat him. In the present, Luffy is still upset and sad that Ace has died and proclaims to Jimbei that he never will be the King of the Pirates because he is too weak.
505	49	"I Want to See Them! Luffy's Mournful Cry!"; Transliteration: "Aitsura ni Aitē! Rufi Namida no Sakebi" (Japanese: あいつらに会いてェ! ルフィ涙の叫び)	Yoshihiro Ueda	Yoshiyuki Suga	July 3, 2011
At Windmill Village, Garp visits Dadan and the mountain bandits. Dadan fights the retired Vice-Admiral. Makino stops Dadan and tells her that both Garp and Luffy is suffering as a result of Ace's death. When the Mayor asks about Luffy's survival, Dadan screams for her adopted son, telling him not to be defeated. Meanwhile, at the New World, a funeral is held for Ace and Whitebeard. Shanks mourns the loss of his friends before he departs from the New World. At Amazon Lily, Luffy is still distraught because of Ace's death. Jimbei tells Luffy not to blame Ace for his actions. Enraged, Luffy tries to fight Jimbei, but the fishman easily defeats him. When Jimbei queries about what Luffy still has left, Luffy in tears tells Jimbei that he wants to see his crew.
506	50	"Straw Hats in Shock! The Bad News Has Reached Them!"; Transliteration: "Mugiwara no Ichimi Gekishin! Motarasareta Kyōhō" (Japanese: 麦わらの一味激震! もたらされた凶報)	Gō Koga	Hitoshi Tanaka	July 10, 2011
On Kuraigana Island, Zoro confronts and is nearly defeated several Humandrills, but is stopped by Mihawk. On Birdie Kingdom, Chopper is captured by a human tribe and attempts to escape, but is stopped by the giant birds. Eventually, the tribe befriends the birds and Chopper before he receives the newspaper about Ace's fate. On Weatheria, Nami is working hard labor when she also receives the newspaper. On the Bowin Island, Usopp has become overweight despite Heracles' objections and knocks down a News Coo with a newspaper. On Kamabakka Kingdom, Sanji has become a crossdresser and watches the sunset; he receives the newspaper and becomes horrified about Ace's death. On Tequila Wolf, Robin decides to see Luffy and her friends but not before she recevives the Revolutionary Army's notices. Meanwhile, on Baldimore, Franky remembers that he defeated a mechanical polar bear after finding a stash of cola, before a fax machine prints out a newspaper about Ace's death. At Hungaria, Brook is writing music for the Longarm Tribe when he loses his concentration and discovers Ace's death. Back on Kuraigana Island, Zoro tells Mihawk that Kuma teleported him, and Mihawk informs Zoro of Ace's death.
507	51	"Reunited with Dark King Rayleigh! Decision Time for Luffy!"; Transliteration: "Meiō Reirī to no Saikai – Rufi Ketsudan no Toki" (Japanese: 冥王レイリーとの再会 ルフィ決断の時)	Takahiro Imamura	Tomohiro Nakayama	July 17, 2011
On Maiden Island, Rayleigh kills a Sea King and arrives on the island in front of Law's crew. Meanwhile, at Amazon Lily, Hancock is contemplating about marriage when Jimbei and Luffy meet the Dark King, who tells that Law has left the island with his crew. Rayleigh gives back Luffy's straw hat and befriends Hancock and her sisters. Rayleigh tells Hancock that Kuma was the one who sent Luffy to Amazon Lily just before he teleported the Straw Hat crew away. However, Rayleigh cannot bring Luffy back to the Sabaody Archipelago, as he would suffer the same fate on the island. He gives Luffy an offer to be trained. Meanwhile, at the Bowin Islands, an overweight Usopp desperately tries to escape and fight despite Heracles' objections. Usopp is sucked into the island's mouth but is rescued by Heracles. Usopp makes a vow to Heracles that he will not abandon Luffy.
508	52	"Back to Our Captain! A Jail Break at the Sky Island and the Incident on the Winter Island!"; Transliteration: "Senchō no Moto e – Sorajima no Datsugoku to Fuyujima no Jiken" (Japanese: 船長のもとへ 空島の脱獄と冬島の事件)	Katsumi Tokoro	Hirohiko Kamisaka	July 31, 2011
At Amazon Lily, Luffy is trying to make up his mind regarding Rayleigh's offer, as he made a promise to his crew to meet in three days. On Weatheria, Nami attempts to flee from the island by stealing a local balloon, but it crashes and Nami is captured by the townspeople as a traitor. After Nami bursts into tears while talking about Luffy's failure to save Ace, she flees with Haredas and is eventually chased by the townspeople yet again. Meanwhile, on Karakuri Island, Franky asks Kitton to use his ship, only to be rejected. When he is told that there is an ice breaker developed in Dr. Vegapunk's laboratory, he finds the laboratory and is chased by the Marines. Franky discovers blueprints and a button with a pirate mark. When he pushes the button, it explodes, destroying the laboratory and seemingly killing Franky.
509	53	"Encounter! The Great Swordsman Mihawk! Zoro's Self-Willed Deadly Struggle!"; Transliteration: "Sesshoku! Daikengō Mihōku – Zoro Iji no Shitō" (Japanese: 接触! 大剣豪ミホーク ゾロ意地の死闘)	Yoshihiro Ueda	Yoshiyuki Suga	August 7, 2011
On Kuraigana Island, Zoro tries to use Mihawk's boat to escape but is stopped by the humandrills. He also discovers that the humandrills have used Zoro's techniques. Mihawk tells Zoro that humandrills have used their behavior while watching other humans and tells Zoro to rest, but confronts the humandrills. Meanwhile, on Namakura Island, the shamans mistake Brook's music scores as talismans against the Longarm tribe. The Longarms confront the shamans of the island; however, Brook reveals that the talismans are music. After playing a song, the shamans capture some of the tribe members. When Brook tells the shamans to release the Longarms, the tribe captures Brook. On Amazon Lily, Luffy finally makes up his mind and decides to go back to Marineford.
510	54	"A Disaster for Sanji! The Queen's Return to the Kingdom!"; Transliteration: "Sanji no Junan – Ōkoku e to Kikanshita Joō!" (Japanese: サンジの受難 王国へと帰還した女王!)	Yoshihiro Ueda	Tomohiro Nakayama	August 14, 2011
Jimbei and Luffy hijack a Marine ship and enter Marineford again using the Gates of Justice. At the Birdie Kingdom, the local tribe gives Chopper a basket of fruit and cotton candy. Chopper eventually flies off with one of the kingdom's birds and discovers a newspaper, much to his horror than before. Meanwhile, on the East Blue's bridge, Robin is given a photograph and the Revolutionaries offer her to meet with the leader, as she is the only survivor of Ohara. Robin is given a newspaper, informing her that Luffy is alive and learns about what is going on. On Kamabakka Kingdom, Ivankov returns to the kingdom. Sanji confronts Ivankov, and is informed about what happened to his crew. Sanji and Ivankov fight each other and Ivankov defeats him with the Death Wink, Hell Wink, and Galaxy Wink techniques. Sanji is horrified to learn about Luffy's recent involvement. At Baltigo, Ivankov informs Dragon about Luffy's escape. Dragon tells Ivankov about what happened to Kuma, and is told that his son has made it to Marineford.
511	55	"Unexpected Relanding! Luffy, to Marineford!"; Transliteration: "Masaka no Saijōriku! Rufi Marinfōdo e!" (Japanese: まさかの再上陸! ルフィ海軍本部へ!)	Makoto Sonoda	Hitoshi Tanaka	August 21, 2011
Luffy finally arrives at Marineford along with Rayleigh and Jimbei. Luffy uses the Gum-Gum Whip technique on the Marines, allowing him to reach the Ox Bell – ringing it 16 times to signify the end of the war. Luffy follows the reporters and throws a bouquet of flowers. The reporters take Luffy's pictures, along with his tattoo. Luffy, Jimbei, and Rayleigh leave Marineford. Meanwhile, the Five Elders discuss their plans to fill the three remaining Warlord positions with powerful warriors. At the New World, Sengoku resigns from his Fleet Admiral position. Back at Marineford, Koby decides to get stronger. Meanwhile, Kidd hears of Luffy's recent involvement in Marineford. In the open sea, Bege's ship is sucked into a vortex, Hawkins challenges Brownbeard while reading the news, and Urouge discovers an island with thunderstorms. Kidd uses his Devil Fruit powers to defeat the pirates and vows to defeat Luffy.
512	56	"With Hopes It Will Reach My Friends! Big News Spreading Fast!"; Transliteration: "Nakama ni Todoke – Kakemeguru Dai-nyūsu!" (Japanese: 仲間に届け かけめぐる大ニュース!)	Yutaka Nakashima	Hirohiko Kamisaka	August 28, 2011
Buggy tearfully reunites with his crew on an unknown island. Alvida discovers a treasure mark from which Luffy found in Impel Down. Mr. 3 delivers a message from the World Government to Buggy. At the Sabaody Archipelago, Duval and the Flying Fish Riders confront the Copper Pirates. Shakky, Camie, Hatchan, and Pappag entrust the protection of the ship to Duval. Eventually, the pirates confront Kuma and the World Government. At Alabasta, Cobra, Chaka, and Koza learn they have problems with other pirates. However, Igaram tells them that Vivi and Karoo were excited that Luffy has survived. On another unknown island, Crocodile and Mr. 1 read the news on Luffy's involvement and decide to return to the New World. Chopper flies on a bird when he receives Luffy's message. Robin travels to the East Blue and receives Luffy's message. On Kamabakka Kingdom, Sanji and Ivankov receive the news on Luffy's involvement. Usopp tries to escape Bowin Island when he and Heracles receive the news. On Weatheria, Nami and Haredas receives Luffy's message while trying to escape. Franky, having survived the explosion at Karakuri Island, also receives the news. Brook is caged by the Longarms when he receives the news. On Kuraigana Island, Zoro and Perona eventually receives Luffy's message.
513	57	"Pirates Get on the Move! Astounding New World!"; Transliteration: "Ugokidasu Kaizoku-tachi! Kyōtendōchi no Shinsekai" (Japanese: 動き出す海賊たち! 驚天動地の新世界)	Hiroyuki Satō	Yoshiyuki Suga	September 4, 2011
Near the Sabaody Archipelago, Law and his crew decide to wait for the proper moment to enter the New World. On a winter island, X Drake confronts Kaido's security guard to enter a town. Meanwhile, on a local spring island, Apoo runs on an invisible road to the sky. At a burning island, Blackbeard defeats Bonney and abandons her to be captured by Akainu. At Marie Jois, Doflamingo tells a government official that he seemingly killed Moria while in Marineford. However, Doflamingo does not care about the World Government's powers, as he is still a pirate. Ashamed for returning to the Birdie Kingdom too soon, Chopper wears a disguise. After being allowed to stay on the island to study the local medical plants, Chopper makes a tearful vow to Luffy that he will train intensively.
514	58	"Living through Hell! Sanji's Fight for His Manhood!"; Transliteration: "Jigoku o Ikinuke – Sanji Otoko o Kaketa Shōbu" (Japanese: 地獄を生き抜け サンジ男をかけた勝負)	Aya Komaki	Hitoshi Tanaka	September 11, 2011
On Weatheria, Nami is cornered by the scientists again. However, Nami apologizes and takes off her shoes before luring the scientists to the edge of a cliff, allowing Nami to stay on the island. Nami requests Haredas to teach her the weather of the New World, as she wants to help Luffy on his journey to become King of the Pirates. Nami also requests that she will use the Weather Balls as weapons. Meanwhile, on Kurakiri Island, the Marines investigate the lab's destruction. Franky learns about Vegapunk's inventions and uses a tiger mat as a cover for his head. Franky tells his friends about his dream and decides to help his captain by acquiring new skills learned from Dr. Vegapunk's inventions. When his mat is burned, Franky scares off the Marines. On Kamabakka Kingdom, Sanji learns from Ivankov that eating helps his body to become aggressive. Despite Ivankov's refusal to teach the dish of aggression, Sanji declines his offer to use Newkama Kempo as he is a man who likes beautiful ladies. Ivankov offers to teach Sanji the ways of newkama cooking if he can gather 99 recipes from around the kingdom and protect his manhood while doing so. Sanji finally accepts Ivankov's offer and proceeds to fight the Newkamas.
515	59	"I Will Get Much, Much Stronger! Zoro's Pledge to his Captain!"; Transliteration: "Madamada Tsuyoku Naru! Zoro Senchō e no Chikai" (Japanese: まだまだ強くなる! ゾロ船長への誓い)	Yoshihiro Ueda	Tomohiro Nakayama	September 18, 2011
At the Tehna Gehna Kingdom, Brook is displayed to the townsfolk while reading the newspaper. Brook tries to train himself so he can reach 40 degrees, but this fails. Brook decides to perform his new song, "Bone to be Wild", on a guitar. Meanwhile, under the East Blue's large bridge, the Revolutionaries learn of Robin's past with Crocodile as they depart to Baltigo. Despite Robin's initial reluctance, Robin finally decides to improve herself by joining them. At the Bowin Islands, Usopp tells Heracules about his past with Luffy and decides to train under him to become stronger. Heracules tells Usopp about the Pop Greens, which can be used as a weapon, before he begins to exercise again. On Kuraigana Island, Mihawk declines Zoro's request to train him, but after realizing that Zoro defeated the Humandrills, Mihawk finally decides to train him. Zoro then proceeds to begin his training by fighting the Humandrills again. The other Straw Hat Pirates are informed that in two years from now, they will reunite with Luffy at the Sabaody Archipelago.
516	60	"Luffy's Training Begins! To the Place We Promised in 2 Years!"; Transliteration: "Rufi Shugyō Kaishi – Ninengo ni Yakusoku no Basho de" (Japanese: ルフィ修行開始 2年後に約束の場所で)	Katsumi Tokoro	Hirohiko Kamisaka	September 25, 2011
Jimbei thanks Luffy for what he has done to him. Vowing to meet again at Fishman Island, Jimbei and Luffy go their separate ways. At Rayleigh's request, Hancock's ship lands on a Ruskaina, an abandoned island northwest of Maiden Island. As Hancock and Luffy go their separate ways, Rayleigh tells Luffy about the island. Luffy tries to attack a large elephant with Second Gear, but it fails. Rayleigh teaches Luffy three Haki techniques, using the first technique, Observation Haki (a power feeling a person's presence) to avoid the elephant's attack. Rayleigh then knocks out the elephant with the second technique Armament Haki (another technique used as an invisible shield and can render a Logia-type Devil Fruit user unconscious). Rayleigh also reveals that the Armament Haki can be transferred into a weapon. When the elephant tries to attack again, Rayleigh finally defeats it using the third and final technique Conqueror's Haki, a rare type of Haki that can only be awakened by a user. Luffy promises to Rayleigh that he will stay to train hard for the next two years to control his three Haki techniques and prepare to reunite with his crew. The next day, Luffy begins his hard training with Rayleigh.

== Home media release ==
=== Japanese ===
Avex Mode (Japan, Region 2 DVD)
Volume		Episodes	Release date	Ref.
14THシーズン マリンフォード編	piece.01	459–462	October 5, 2011	
14THシーズン マリンフォード編	piece.02	463–466	November 2, 2011	
14THシーズン マリンフォード編	piece.03	467–470	December 7, 2011	
14THシーズン マリンフォード編	piece.04	471–474	January 11, 2012	
14THシーズン マリンフォード編	piece.05	475–478	February 1, 2012	
14THシーズン マリンフォード編	piece.06	479–482	March 3, 2012	
14THシーズン マリンフォード編	piece.07	483–486	April 4, 2012	
14THシーズン マリンフォード編	piece.08	487–490	May 9, 2012	
14THシーズン マリンフォード編	piece.09	491, 493–495	June 6, 2012	
14THシーズン マリンフォード編	piece.10	496–499	July 4, 2012	
14THシーズン マリンフォード編	piece.11	500–503	August 1, 2012	
14THシーズン マリンフォード編	piece.12	504–507	September 5, 2012	
14THシーズン マリンフォード編	piece.13	508–511	October 3, 2012	
14THシーズン マリンフォード編	piece.14	512–516	November 11, 2012	
ONE PIECE Log Collection	"MARINEFORD"	459–476	August 22, 2014	
ONE PIECE Log Collection	"ACE"	477–491, 493–496	August 22, 2014	
ONE PIECE Log Collection	"PROMISE"	497–516	September 26, 2014	
ONE PIECE ワンピース・ヒーロースペシャル!		336, 492	November 21, 2011	
トリコ×ワンピース コラボスペシャル完全版		492, 542	October 26, 2012	

=== English ===
In North America, the season was recategorized as the majority of "Season Eight" for its DVD release by Funimation Entertainment. The Australian Season Eight sets were renamed Collection 38 through 42. Episode 492, the Toriko crossover, was omitted from the English home video releases.

Funimation Entertainment (USA, Region 1), Manga Entertainment (UK, Region 2), Madman Entertainment (Australia, Region 4)
Volume		Episodes	Release date			ISBN	Ref.
Volume		Episodes	USA	UK	Australia	ISBN	Ref.
Season Eight	Voyage One	457–468	May 31, 2016	N/A	October 5, 2016	ISBN N/A	
Season Eight	Voyage Two	469–480	July 26, 2016	N/A	November 2, 2016	ISBN N/A	
Season Eight	Voyage Three	481–491	September 20, 2016	N/A	December 7, 2016	ISBN N/A	
Season Eight	Voyage Four	493–504	November 8, 2016	N/A	January 11, 2017	ISBN N/A	
Season Eight	Voyage Five	505–516	December 13, 2016	N/A	March 8, 2017	ISBN N/A	
Collections	19	446-468	May 23, 2017	October 22, 2018	N/A	ISBN N/A	
Collections	20	469-491	September 19, 2017	December 17, 2018	N/A	ISBN N/A	
Collections	21	493-516	December 5, 2017	March 16, 2020	N/A	ISBN N/A	
Treasure Chest Collection	Five	397-491	N/A		September 6, 2017	ISBN N/A	
Voyage Collection	Ten	446-491	N/A		July 4, 2018	ISBN N/A	
