= Keren (kabuki) =

Stagecraft tricks used in Japanese kabuki theater

Keren (外連 (ケレン), lit. 'outside party') are stagecraft tricks used in Japanese kabuki theater, making use of trapdoors, revolving stages, and other equipment.

Often translated as "playing to the gallery," drama enthusiasts consider these sorts of adaptations to be demeaning to the art of kabuki. According to one scholar, Ichikawa Ennosuke, "Rapid 'trick' appearances and disappearances of the actor are relatively few and are held in low esteem by the Kabuki connoisseur, who refers to them as keren (playing to the gallery)".

== Primary forms of keren ==
Chūnori (宙乗り, lit. 'mid-air riding')
Makes use of strings to make an actor fly out over the audience, often up into the third floor of the theater. For obvious reasons, this would come into use when portraying various sorts of flying creatures such as ghosts, spirits, or the bird-like tengu. Ichikawa Ennosuke III is often called "the king of chūnori"; he performed it for the 5,000th time in 2000, playing the role of Guan Yu.
Hayagawari (早替り, lit. 'quick change')
Is used to effect quick changes of costume for an actor while he remains on stage. Sometimes this will be done with strings which pull off or pull apart a top layer of costume to reveal another costume underneath. In a technique called hikinuki (引抜), the outermost layer is held on with only a few threads; stage assistants called kuroko appear on stage and pull these threads, allowing this outer costume layer to come off quite quickly and easily. This might also be accomplished even more simply by having the actor pull his top layer off or apart himself. Hayagawari is used for a number of characters who remove disguises to reveal their true identity, and for hengemono, dances in which a single actor plays multiple roles.
Honmizu (本水)
Refers to a number of different special effects involving water.
Seri (迫)
Refers to the stage traps that have been commonly employed in kabuki since the middle of the eighteenth century. These traps raise and lower actors or sets to the stage. Seridashi or seriage refers to the traps moving upward and serisage or serioroshi when they are being lowered. This technique is often used for dramatic effect of having an entire scene rise up to appear onstage.
Yatai kuzushi (屋台崩し, lit. 'pulling down a festival float')
Refers to the dramatic destruction of on-stage edifices.

== See also ==
- Wazuma
