= List of Toriko chapters =

Toriko is a Japanese manga series written and illustrated by Mitsutoshi Shimabukuro. It was published by Shueisha – chapterwise in the manga anthology Weekly Shōnen Jump from May 19, 2008, to November 21, 2016. Its chapters were collected in 43 tankōbon volumes. It follows the adventure of Toriko, a Gourmet Hunter, as he searches for rare, diverse foods to complete a full-course meal. On his journey, he is accompanied by the timid chef Komatsu who wants to improve his skills.

In North America, Viz Media released the series in English starting on June 1, 2010, and chapterwise (starting at chapter 171) in Weekly Shonen Jump (originally named Weekly Shonen Jump Alpha) from the debut issue on January 30, 2012. In Australasia, the English volumes are distributed by Madman Entertainment since July 10, 2010.

== Volume list ==
No.	Title	Original release date	English release date
01	Toriko the Bishoku-Ya!! Bishoku-Ya Toriko!! (美食屋・トリコ‼)	November 4, 2008; 978-4-08-874608-1	June 1, 2010; 978-1-4215-3509-8
001. "Toriko the Bishoku-Ya!!" (美食屋・トリコ‼, Bishoku-ya Toriko!!); 002. "Fork and Knife!!" (フォークとナイフ‼, Fōku to Naifu!!); 003. "The Fruit of Rainbow!!" (虹の実‼, Niji no Mi!!); 004. "Nail Punch!!" (釘パンチ!!, Kugi Panchi!!); 005. "The Traps of the Troll Kong!!" (トロルコングの罠‼, Tororu Kongu no Wana!!); 006. "If We Don't Eat Them!!" (食わねーなら‼, Kuwanē nara!!); 007. "At Hotel Gourmet!!" (ホテルグルメにて‼, Hoteru Gurume nite!!)
The International Gourmet Organization (IGO) sends the head chef of the 5-star Hotel Gourmet, Komatsu, to hire Gourmet Hunter Toriko to capture a Garara Gator for a meal. Toriko is a legendary Gourmet Hunter, being one of the Four Heavenly Kings, he is unusually strong with an inhuman sense of smell, who wants to find the ingredients for the menu of the full-course meal of his life. Komatsu decides to accompany Toriko on the hunt, as he wishes to become the best chef in the world. Toriko kills a 300-year-old Garara with his Fork and Knife technique and Komatsu cooks some of it to taste, but Toriko ends up eating all of it. Toriko is contracted by IGO again, this time to enter one of their biotope gardens and obtain a Rainbow Fruit, which is in the nest of the four-armed Troll Kong gorillas. After defeating the leader or silverback of the group by intimidation alone, Toriko obtains the legendary fruit that changes taste. The Rainbow Fruit becomes the dessert on Toriko's full-course meal.
02	Coco!! Koko!! (ココ‼)	November 4, 2008; 978-4-08-874609-8	September 7, 2010; 978-1-4215-3510-4
008. "Coco!!" (ココ‼, Koko!!); 009. "The Days of the Four Heavenly Kings!!" (四天王の日々‼, Shiten'nō no Hibi!!); 010. "Coco's Secret!!" (ココの秘密‼, Koko no Himitsu!!); 011. "Into the Sandy Cave...!!" (洞窟の奥へ...‼, Dōkutsu no Oku e...!!); 012. "Versus! The Serpent of Devil!!" (対決!デビル大蛇‼, Taiketsu! Debiru Orochi!!); 013. "5-Hit!!" (5連!!, Go-Ren!!); 014. "Komatsu Dies!!" (小松、死す‼, Komatsu, Shisu!!); 015. "Puffer Fish Whale!!" (フグ鯨‼, Fugu Kujira!!); 016. "Puffer Fish Whale, Captured!!" (フグ鯨、捕獲‼, Fugu Kujira, Hokaku!!)
Toriko takes Komatsu on a trip to capture and taste the Puffer Whale, which only enter shallow water once in ten years to breed. Due to the difficulty in preparing the fish, it turns poisonous at the hint of danger, Toriko recruits his friend, fortuneteller and Gourmet Hunter, who is also one of the Four Heavenly Kings, Coco. Coco is immune to 500 kinds of poisons, having injected them into himself in order to develop immunity, causing him to be able to produce his own poison from his body. The location of the whales' breeding ground is a beach inside a cave that is home to the Devil Python. Toriko and Coco team up to defeat a python, while Komatsu is abducted and ends up dying. He is brought back to life by Jiro, called the Knocking Master because he can use the Knocking technique, which harmlessly subdues creatures, on any animal.
03	It Appeared!! Arawareta Mono!! (現れたモノ‼)	February 4, 2009; 978-4-08-874632-6	December 7, 2010; 978-1-4215-3511-1
017. "Puffer Fish Whale, Real Food!!" (フグ鯨、実食‼, Fugu Kujira, Jisshoku!!); 018. "It Appeared!!" (現れたモノ‼, Arawareta Mono!!); 019. "Gourmet Corps!!" (美食會‼, Bishoku-kai!!); 020. "Gourmet Research Facility!!" (グルメ研究所‼, Gurume Kenkyūjo!!); 021. "Gourmet Coliseum!!" (グルメコロシアム‼, Gurume Koroshiamu!!); 022. "Battle Wolf!!" (バトルウルフ‼, Batoru Urufu!!); 023. "Welcome!!" (「ようこそ」‼, Yōkoso!!); 024. "Slipped in Thing!!" (紛れていたモノ‼, Magireteita Mono!!); 025. "Time of Love!!" (「愛」の時間‼, Ai no Jikan!!)
Toriko and Coco capture some Puffer Whales, but Coco has Komatsu remove the poison organ from it as he is exhausted from battle, and he succeeds in only one. A strange extremely strong, to the point of scaring even Toriko and Coco, non-living creature swims out from the water right by them, but he only kills the other hunters waiting outside the cave as well as the captain of the Gourmet Police. It is a GT Robo from the Gourmet Corps, an organization out to capture the world's food supply, and also attacked the IGO's biotopes, causing them to call in the Four Heavenly Kings; Toriko, Coco, Sunny and Zebra. Toriko, with Komatsu, is already on his way to IGO's largest biotope in order to capture the Regal Mammoth, but when they get there, Mansam, chief of the facility, takes them to the Gourmet Coliseum. There, animals are pitted to fight against each other in order to research and measure their strength, with country leaders gambling on which will win. The finale is a battle royale between six different animals, including the previously extinct Battle Wolf. Toriko realizes something is odd and enters the ring, where he realizes the Battle Wolf in pregnant. He defeats the other animals, breaking the protective glass in the process, while it gives birth just as the sixth opponent enters rampaging from pheromones used to get the animals to fight, administered by Rin the IGO's specialist in the field, and causes the audience to flee. It is easily defeated by the Battle Wolf, which, along with Mansam, is shot by the GT Robo, who snuck in.
04	Sunny!! Sanī!! (サニー‼)	May 1, 2009; 978-4-08-874666-1	March 4, 2011; 978-1-4215-3512-8
026. "GT Robo"; 027. "Reason For Anger"; 028. "You are..."; 029. "Meal"; 030. "Sunny!!"; 031. "The First Biotope!!"; 032. "Rockdrum"; 033. "Dining Kitchen"; 034. "Komatsu and Sunny"
Mansam heals his wounds from pouring a special alcoholic beverage on them and explains to Komatsu that the GT Robo is controlled by someone from afar, later shown to be Bei of the Gourmet Corps. Angry at it for shooting the Battle Wolf, Toriko attacks the GT Robot. His usual Spiked Punch is ineffective, forcing him to use the Ice Pick Spiked Punch - it destroys the robot's head and Mansam orders his men to fire laser cannons on the robot, revealing its core antenna. The antenna flees from the attacks, but is obliterated by Mansam's pet beast Ricky and Toriko names the baby Battle Wolf, "Terry Cloth". Sunny, Rin's older brother, arrives bringing the Regal Mammoth, however it is only a child and the group heads out to get the parent.
05	The Regal Plateau!! Rīgaru Kōgen e!! (リーガル高原へ‼)	August 4, 2009; 978-4-08-874718-7	June 7, 2011; 978-1-4215-3693-4
035. "To the Regal Plateau!!"; 036. "Dash! Regal Island"; 037. "The Gourmet Corps and the Gourmet Cells"; 038. "Devil Athletics"; 039. "Malevolent Elephant"; 040. "The Man That Appeared"; 041. "Showdown and Invasion!"; 042. "Death Omen"; 043. "Sunny's Anger"
06	Ten-fold!! "10 Ren"!! ("10連"!!)	October 2, 2009; 978-4-08-874739-2	September 6, 2011; 978-1-4215-3694-1
044. "Coco, Serious"; 045. "Aqua Regia"; 046. "Death Omen!!"; 047. "Hair Battle"; 048. "The Worst Encounter!!"; 049. "Omen Of Evolution!!"; 050. "Time Limit 5 Minutes!!"; 051. "Resolution!!"; 052. "10 Ren"
07	Jewel of the Jungle!! Janguru no Kesshō!! (ジャングルの結晶!!)	December 4, 2009; 978-4-08-874768-2	December 6, 2011; 978-1-4215-3798-6
053. "Escape!!"; 054. "The Mammoth's True Food!!"; 055. "Terry's Menu!!"; 056. "Plant Hell, Plunge In!!"; 057. "A Glimpse of The King!!"; 058. "Culmination Of The Jungle"; 059. "BB Corn, True Food!!"; 060. "The Final Ingredient"; 061. "Range!!"
08	Century Soup!! Senchurī Sūpu!! (センチュリースープ‼)	March 4, 2010; 978-4-08-870014-4	February 7, 2012; 978-1-4215-3903-4
062. "New Weapons"; 063. "End of Evolution"; 064. "The Full Stomach Metropolis Gourmet-Town!!"; 065. "Gourmet Living National Treasure Setsuno!!"; 066. "Century Soup!!"; 067. "The Secret of Setsuno's Dining Hall"; 068. "The Meeting Bar, Heavy Lodge"; 069. "The Voyage to Ice Hell"; 070. "Insane Banquet On Board"
09	Battle Below Freezing!! Hyōtenka no Kessen!! (氷点下の決戦!!)	April 30, 2010; 978-4-08-870036-6	April 3, 2012; 978-1-4215-4065-8
071. "The Upwind Path"; 072. "Each One's Route"; 073. "Strike While the Meal is Hot!!"; 074. "Reason for Adventure"; 075. "Outbreak of War!!"; 076. "Buzz!!"; 077. "Battle Below Freezing!!"; 078. "Gourmet Pests"; 079. "Lodge!!"
10	Depths of Hell!! Jigoku no Fuchi!! (地獄の淵!!)	July 2, 2010; 978-4-08-870075-5	June 5, 2012; 978-1-4215-4273-7
080. "Pre-Shot Routine!!"; 081. "Exhaustion!!"; 082. "Trash!!"; 083. "Shaking Continent!"; 084. "The Soup is...!!"; 085. "Heat Energy!!"; 086. "Depths of Hell!!"; 087. "Beyond 10!!"; 088. "Wild Bout!!"
11	The Path of Revival!! Saisei e no Michi!! (再生への道!!)	October 4, 2010; 978-4-08-870113-4	August 7, 2012; 978-1-4215-4308-6
089. "Saiseiya Teppei!!"; 090. "Time of Revival!!"; 091. "As the Soup Dictates"; 092. "Ice Hell's "Century Soup"!!"; 093. "Farewell, Ice Hell!!"; 094. "The Country of Healing, Life"; 095. "Rule!!"; 096. "The Path of Revival"; 097. "Miracle Answer!!"
12	Vegetable Sky!! Bejitaburu Sukai!! (ベジタブルスカイ‼)	December 29, 2010; 978-4-08-870150-9	October 2, 2012; 978-1-4215-4309-3
098. "Komatsu's Century Soup!!"; 099. "Soup Decided!!"; 100. "New Sweets House!!"; 101. "Acacia's Disciples!!"; 102. "Fighting Time!!"; 103. "Combo!!"; 104. "Stairway to Heaven!!"; 105. "To the Inside of the Clouds!!"; 106. "Vegetable Sky!!"
13	The Reality of the Gourmet World!! Gurume-Kai no Genjitsu!! (グルメ界の現実‼)	March 4, 2011; 978-4-08-870190-5	December 4, 2012; 978-1-4215-4310-9
107. "Ozone Herb!!"; 108. "Ozone Herb, the True Food!!"; 109. "Foreign Body!!"; 110. "To the Gourmet World!!"; 111. "The Reality of the Gourmet World!!"; 112. "Different World!!"; 113. "What You're Lacking!!"; 114. "Komatsu's Kitchen Knife!!"; 115. "Summit, Melk Mountain!!"
14	The "Real" Melk!! "Honmono" no Meruku!! ("本物"のメルク‼)	April 4, 2011; 978-4-08-870210-0	February 5, 2013; 978-1-4215-4311-6
116. "Something Unyeilding!!"; 117. "The Secret of the Stardust!!"; 118. "Melk's Sharpening!!"; 119. "Plunging into the Heavy Hole!!"; 120. "The Second Generation's True Colors!!"; 121. "Two Melks!!"; 122. "The "Real" Melk!!"; 123. "The 2nd's Job!!"; 124. "Knife Complete!!"
15	Zebra!! Zebura!! (ゼブラ‼)	July 4, 2011; 978-4-08-870257-5	April 2, 2013; 978-1-4215-4312-3
125. "Journey to the Underworld!!"; 126. "Honey Prison!!"; 127. "Zebra!!"; 128. "Discharge!!"; 129. "Zebra's Sins!!"; 130. "Sand World!!"; 131. "Desert Labyrinth!!"; 132. "Gourmet Pyramid!!"; 133. "Search For Komatsu"; 134. "Mystery of the Pyramid"
16	Reunion With The "Worst"!! Saiaku to no Saikai!! (最悪との再会‼)	September 2, 2011; 978-4-08-870285-8	June 4, 2013; 978-1-4215-5149-4
135. "Recovery!!"; 136. "Vs. Salamander Sphinx!!"; 137. "The Cola's True Form!!"; 138. "Prepare the Mellow Cola!!"; 139. "Zebra's Conditions"; 140. "Joint Attack"; 141. "Pulse"; 142. "Partnership Conditions!!"; 143. "Living Explosives"; 144. "Reunion With The "Worst""
17	Shining Gourami!! Sansan Guramī!! (サンサングラミー‼)	November 4, 2011; 978-4-08-870305-3	August 6, 2013; 978-1-4215-5150-0
145. "Gourmet Shrine!!" (グルメ神社‼, Gurume Jinja!!); 146. "Surprise Apple!!" (ビックリアップル‼, Bikkuri Appuru!!); 147. "The Chicken Tiger's Egg!!" (ニワトラの卵‼, Niwatora no Tamago!!); 148. "The Shining Gourami!!" (サンサングラミー‼, Sansan Guramī!!); 149. "Mors Mountains!!" (モルス山脈‼, Morusu Sanmyaku!!); 150. "Death Fall!!" (デスフォール‼, Desu Fōru!!); 151. "The Evolved Technique!!" (進化した技‼, Shinkashita Waza!!); 152. "Instinct!!" (直観‼, Chokkan!!); 153. "Twin Nail Punch!!" (ツイン釘パンチ‼, Tsuin Kugi Panchi!!)
18	Gourmet Casino!! Gurume Kajino!! (グルメカジノ!!)	February 3, 2012; 978-4-08-870371-8	October 1, 2013; 978-1-4215-5151-7
154. "Komatsu's Food Luck!!" (小松の食運‼, Komatsu no Shokuun!!); 155. "Trying the Shining Gourami!!" (サンサングラミー実食‼, Sansan Guramī Jisshoku!!); 156. "Chefs!!" (料理人たち‼, Ryōrinin-tachi!!); 157. "The President's Treasure Chest!!" (会長の宝箱‼, Kaichō no Takarabako!!); 158. "Komatsu and Otake!!" (小松と大竹!!, Komatsu to Ōtake!!); 159. "The Full Course's Voice!!" (フルコースの声!!, Furu Kōsu no Koe!!); 160. "Meteor Garlic!!" (メテオガーリック!!, Meteo Gārikku!!); 161. "Gourmet Casino!!" (グルメカジノ!!, Gurume Kajino!!); 162. "Gamble Time!!" (賭博時間（ギャンブルタイム）!!, Gyanburu Taimu!!)
19	Gourmet Tasting!! Gurume Teisutingu!! (グルメテイスティング‼)	April 4, 2012; 978-4-08-870403-6	December 3, 2013; 978-1-4215-5152-4
163. "The Secrets of the Underground Cooking World!!" (地下料理界の秘密‼, Chika Ryōri-kai no Himitsu!!); 164. "Gourmet Tasting!!" (グルメテイスティング‼, Gurume Teisutingu!!); 165. "Vs. Livebearer!!" (VSライブベアラー‼, Bāsasu Raibubearā!!); 166. "The Heart of the Game!!" (勝負のキモ‼, Shōbu no Kimo!!); 167. "Joker Foodstuffs!!" (ジョーカー食材‼, Jōkā Shokuzai!!); 168. "Coco's Aim!!" (ココの狙い‼, Koko no Nerai!!); 169. "The Victorious Eating Combination!!" (勝利の食べ合わせ!!, Shōri no Tabeawase!!); 170. "Trying the Meteor Garlic!!" (メテオガーリック実食‼, Meteo Gārikku Jisshoku!!); 171. "Conqueror of the Age!!" (時代の覇者‼, Jidai no Hasha!!)
20	Ichiryu and Midora!! Ichiryū to Midora!! (一龍と三虎‼)	July 4, 2012; 978-4-08-870465-4	February 4, 2014; 978-1-4215-5369-6
172. "Ichiryu And Midora!!" (一龍と三虎‼, Ichiryū to Midora!!); 173. "Gourmet Santa!!" (グルメサンタ‼, Gurume Santa!!); 174. "Madam Fish!!" (マダムフィッシュ‼, Madamu Fisshu!!); 175. "The Pot Pond Competition!!" (鍋池の競争‼, Nabe-ike no Kyōsō!!); 176. "King Vinegar!!" (王酢‼, Ōzu!!); 177. "Dodurian Bomb!!" (ドドリアンボム‼, Dodorian Bomu!!); 178. "Eco Nori!!" (エコのり‼, Eko Nori‼); 179. "Eho-Maki Complete!!" (恵方巻完成‼, Ehōmaki Kansei!!); 180. "Disappearance Cuisine!!" (雲隠れ割烹‼, Kumogakure Kappō!!)
21	Decisive Battle! Shokurin Temple!! Kessen! Shokurin-ji!! (決戦!食林寺!!)	October 4, 2012; 978-4-08-870518-7	April 1, 2014; 978-1-4215-5615-4
181. "Shokurin Temple!!" (食林寺!!, Shokurin-ji!!); 182. "Bubble Fruit!!" (シャボンフルーツ!!, Shabon Furūtsu!!); 183. "The Power of Food Honor!!" (食義の実力!!, Shokugi no Jitsuryoku!!); 184. "Shokurin Temple Training!!" (食林寺の修業!!, Shokurin-ji no Shugyō!!); 185. "Bubble Way!!" (バブルウェイ!!, Baburu Wei!!); 186. "Food Immersion!!" (食没!!, Shokubotsu!!); 187. "Bubble Fruit, the Actual Food!!" (シャボンフルーツ実食!!, Shabon Furūtsu Jisshoku!!); 188. "Decisive Battle! Shokurin Temple!!" (決戦!食林寺!!, Kessen! Shokurin-ji!!); 189. "One Who Has Mastered Food Honor!!" (食義を極めし者!!, Shokugi o Kiwameshi Mono!!)
22	The Four Beasts!! Shijū!! (四獣‼)	December 4, 2012; 978-4-08-870553-8	June 3, 2014; 978-1421564814
190. "Knife vs. Kitchen Knife!!" (ナイフVS包丁‼, Naifu Bāsasu Hōchō!!); 191. "Otake's Partner!!" (大竹のコンビ‼!!, Ōtake no Konbi!!); 192. "Hidden Hors D'oeuvre!!" (隠された前菜‼, Kakusareta Zensai!!); 193. "The Members of the 0th Biotope!!" (第0ビオトープ職員‼, Dai-zero Biotōpu Shokuin!!); 194. "The Four Beasts!!" (四獣‼, Shijū!!); 195. "Dinner at Zen-O!!" (膳王の晩餐‼, Zen-Ō no Bansan!!); 196. "The Four Beasts Invade!!" (四獣侵攻‼, Shijū Shinkō!!); 197. "4 vs. 4!!" (4vs4‼, Yon Bāsasu Yon!!); 198. "Over 100!!" (オーバー100‼, Ōbā Hyaku!!)
23	Oshoku Bansan!! Ōshoku Bansan!! ("王食晩餐"‼)	February 4, 2013; 978-4-08-870617-7	August 5, 2014; 978-1421564821
199. "Four Conclusions!!" (4つの決着‼, Yottsu no Ketchaku!!); 200. "The Main Body of the Four Beasts!!" (四獣の本体‼, Shijū no Hontai!!); 201. "Human World Pandemonium!!" (人間界大混乱‼, Ningen-kai Dai-konran!!); 202. "Green Rain!!" (緑の雨（グリーンレイン）‼, Gurīn Rein!!); 203. "Antidote Cooking!!" (解毒料理‼, Gedoku Ryōri!!); 204. "New Cooking Method!!" (新しい調理法‼, Atarashii Chōri-hō!!); 205. "Curiosity for a Taste!!" (味への好奇心‼, Aji e no Kōkishin!!); 206. "Appetite!!" ("食欲"‼, Shokuyoku!!); 207. "Oshoku Bansan!!" ("王食晩餐"‼, Ōshoku Bansan!!)
24	"Cooking Fest" Opens!! "Kukkingu Fesu" Kaimaku!! (クッキングフェス"開幕‼)	May 2, 2013; 978-4-08-870663-4	October 7, 2014; 978-1421564838
208. "Trying the Four Beasts!!" (四獣、実食‼, Shijū, Jisshoku!!); 209. "Chef Komatsu!!" (料理人・小松‼, Ryōrinin Komatsu!!); 210. "Nail Gun!!" (ネイルガン‼, Neiru Gan!!); 211. "Cooking Fest Opens!!" ("クッキングフェス"開幕‼, "Kukkingu Fesu" Kaimaku!!); 212. "The Contestants Appear!!" (選手入場‼, Senshu Nyūjō!!); 213. "The Preliminaries Start!!" (予選開始‼, Yosen Kaishi!!); 214. "Serious Battle!!" (真剣勝負‼, Shinken Shōbu!!); 215. "Branch Appears!!" (ブランチ、見参‼, Buranchi, Kenzan!!); 216. "Pulling Ahead!!" (ごぼう抜き‼, Gobō-nuki!!); Extra. "Shimabukuro Mitsutoshi x Kishimoto Masashi Special Talk"
25	The Bishokukai Invades!! Bishoku-kai, Shūrai!! (一美食會、襲来!!)	July 4, 2013; 978-4-08-870766-2	December 2, 2014; 978-1421567792
217. "Signal for the Outbreak of War!!" (開戦の合図!!, Kaisen no Aizu!!); 218. "The Bishokukai Invades!!" (美食會、襲来!!, Bishoku-kai, Shūrai!!); 219. "The Fighting Begins!!" (戦闘開始!!, Sentō Kaishi!!); 220. "Wild Battle!!" (野生の闘い!!, Yasei no Tatakai!!); 221. "IGO vs. Bishokukai!!" (IGOvs美食會!!, Ai-Jī-Ō Bāsasu Bishoku-kai!!); 222. "A Catastrophic Joker Card!!" (最悪の切り札（ジョーカー）!!, Saiaku no Jōkā!!); 223. "Targeted Chefs!!" (狙われた料理人!!, Nerawareta Ryōrinin!!); 224. "The World's Hope!!" (世界の希望!!, Sekai no Kibō!!); 225. "Awakening!!" (覚醒!!, Kakusei!!)
26	Beyond Limits!! Genkai no Sono Saki!! (限界のその先!!)	August 2, 2013; 978-4-08-870784-6	February 2, 2015; 978-1421573465
226. "Vs. Tommyrod!!" (VSトミーロッド!!, Bāsasu Tomīroddo!!); 227. "Outcome of the Duel!!" (決闘の行方!!, Kettō no Yukue!!); 228. "Lightning!!" (稲妻!!, Inazuma!!); 229. "Vs. Immortality!!" (vs不死身!!, Bāsasu Fujimi!!); 230. "Betrayal!!" (裏切り!!, Uragiri!!); 231. "Zebra Counterattacks!!" (逆襲のゼブラ!!, Gyakushū no Zebura!!); 232. "Wriggling Shadows!!" (蠢く影!!, Ugomeku Kage!!); 233. "Call!!" (呼び声!!, Yobigoe!!); 234. "Beyond Limits!!" (限界のその先!!, Genkai no Sono Saki!!)
27	Hidden Power!! Himeta Chikara!! (秘めた力!!)	November 1, 2013; 978-4-08-870835-5	April 7, 2015; 978-1421573458
235. "Ultimate Impression!!" (究極の思い込み!!, Kyūkyoku no Omoikomi!!); 236. "The Mightiest Rival!!" (最強の敵（ライバル）!!, Saikyō no Raibaru!!); 237. "Scorching Battle!!" (灼熱の闘い（バトル）!!, Shakunetsu no Batoru!!); 238. "Limits of Strength!!" (力の限り!!, Chikara no Kagiri!!); 239. "Desperate Situation!!" (絶体絶命!!, Zettai Zetsumei!!); 240. "Hidden Power!!" (秘めた力!!, Himeta Chikara!!); 241. "Mastermind!!" (黒幕!!, Kuromaku!!); 242. "The Mystery Man, Joa!!" (謎の男・ジョア!!, Nazo no Otoko: Joa!!); 243. "Rampaging Beast Jiro!!" (暴獣・二狼!!, Bōjū: Jirō!!)
28	The Tiger's Tears!! Tora no Namida!! (虎の涙!!)	January 4, 2014; 978-4-08-870888-1	June 2, 2015; 978-1421576916
244. "Enigmatic Identity!!" (謎を呼ぶ正体!!, Nazo o Yobu Shōtai!!); 245. "The Moment of Closure!!" (終末の刻!!, Shūmatsu no Toki!!); 246. "One More Deciding Battle!!" (もう一つの決戦!!, Mō Hitotsu no Kessen!!); 247. "The Clash of the Dragon and the Tiger!!" (龍虎激突!!, Ryūko Gekitotsu!!); 248. "Ichiryu's Power!!" (一龍の力!!, Ichiryū no Chikara!!); 249. "The Minority's Rebellion!!" (少数派（はぐれもの）の反逆!!, Haguremono no Hangyaku!!); 250. "Bottomless Hunger!!" (底知れぬ空腹!!, Soko-shirenu Kūfuku!!); 251. "Acacia and his Three Disciples!!" (美食神（アカシア）と三弟子!!, Akashia to San-deshi!!); 252. "Acacia's Fairy Tales!!" (アカシアのおとぎ話!!, Akashia no Otogi-banashi!!); 253. "The Tiger's Tears!!" (虎の涙!!, Tora no Namida!!)
29	The World's Greatest Bishokuya!! Sekai-ichi no Bishokuya!! (世界一の美食屋‼)	March 4, 2014; 978-4-08-880024-0	August 4, 2015; 978-1421577821
254. "A Sad End!!" (悲しみの果て‼, Kanashimi no Hate!!); 255. "Awakening!!" (目覚め‼, Mezame!!); 256. "The True Enemy!!" (本当の敵‼, Hontō no Teki!!); 257. "End of an Age!!" (時代の終わり‼, Jidai no Owari!!); 258. "March of Evil!!" (悪の行進‼, Aku no Kōshin!!); 259. "Coco's Hypothesis!!" (ココの仮説‼, Coco no Kasetsu!!); 260. "Toriko's Dream!!" (レトリックの夢‼, Toriko no Yume!!); 261. "Ootake's Ambition!!" (大竹の野望‼, Ōtake no Yabō!!); 262. "Midora's Dining Table!!" (三虎の食卓‼, Midora no Shokutaku!!); 263. "The World's Greatest Bishokuya!!" (世界一の美食屋‼, Sekai-ichi no Bishokuya!!)
30	Now, to Gourmet World!! Iza gurume-kai e!! (いざグルメ界へ‼)	June 4, 2014; 978-4088800561	October 6, 2015; 978-1421579122
264. "Now, to Gourmet World!!" (いざグルメ界へ‼, Iza Gurume-kai e!!); 265. "Rain of Blessings!!" (恵みの雨‼, Megumi no Ame!!); 266. "The Final Treasure Chest!!" (最後の宝箱‼, Saigo no Takara Hako!!); 267. "Birth Cry of Hope!!" (希望の産声‼, Kibō no San Koe!!); 268. "Miracle Eggs!!" (奇跡の卵‼, Kiseki no Tamago!!); 269. "Inherited Heart!!" (受け継がれる心‼, Uketsugareru Kokoro!!); 270. "The Final Key!!" (最後の鍵‼, Saigo no Kagi!!); 271. "Ichiryuu's Message!!" (一龍の言伝‼, Ichiryū no Kotozute!!); 272. "To the Place Where Dreams Await Us!!" (夢の待つ場所へ‼, Yume no Matsu Basho e!!)
31	Hex Food World!! Yōshoku-kai!! (妖食界!!)	September 4, 2014; 978-4-08-880173-5	December 1, 2015; 978-1421580319
273. "Harbor of Evil Spirits!!" (悪霊たちの港!!, Akuryō Tachi no Minato!!); 274. "Bewildered!!" (五里霧中!!, Gorimuchū!!); 275. "The Mist Bamboozlement!! (霧の幻惑!!, Kiri no Genwaku!!); 276. "True Worth of the Year and a Half!!" (一年半の真価!!, Ichinen-han no Shinka!!); 277. "Messenger from Bewitching Food World!!" (妖食界からの使者!!, Yōshoku-kai Kara no Shisha!!); 278. "Labyrinth of Death!!" (死の迷宮!!, Shi no Meikyū!!); 279. "A Guidepost!!" (道標!!, Michishirube!!); 280. "Bewitching Food World!!" (妖食界!!, Yōshoku-kai!!); 281. "The Daruma Hermit!!" (ダルマ仙人!!, Daruma Sennin!!); 282. "Four Paths!!" (四つの道!!, Yottsu no Michi!!)
32	VS Heracles!! Bāsasu Herakuresu!! (バーサスヘラクレス!!)	November 4, 2014; 978-4-08-880210-7	February 2, 2016; 978-1421582665
283. "The Horse King's Sacrifice!!" (馬王のいけにえ!!, Ba Ō no Ikenie); 284. "Toriko's Resolve!!" (トリコの覚悟!!, Toriko no Kakugo!!); 285. "VS Heracles!!" (バーサスヘラクレス!!, Bāsasu Herakuresu!!); 286. "Blue's Awakening!!" ("青"の覚醒!!, "Ao" no Kakusei!!); 287. "Slow Rain and Food King Air!!" (のろま雨と食王!!, Noroma Ame to Shoku-Ō!!); 288. "How to Cook Air!!" (エアの調理法!!, Ea no Chōri-Hō!!); 289. "Continuation - How to Cook Air!!" (継続- エアの調理法!!, Keizoku- Ea no Chōri-Hō!!); 290. "A New King!!" (新たなる王!!, Aratanaru-Ō!!); 291. "AIR, the Actual Tasting!!" (エア, 実食!!, Ea, Jisshoku!!)
33	Now, To Area 7!! Iza Eria Sebun!! (いざエリア7‼)	January 5, 2015; 978-4-08-880274-9	April 5, 2016; 978-1421582672
292. "The Mystery of the Gourmet Cells!!" (グルメ細胞の謎‼, Gurume Saibō no Nazo!!); 293. "NEO's Assault!!" (NEO急襲‼, NEO Kyūshū!!); 294. "Another World!!" (もう一つの世界‼, Mō hitotsu no Sekai!!); 295. "Now, To Area 7!!" (いざエリア7‼, Iza Eria Sebun!!); 296. "The Leader of the Ecosystem!!" (生態系の統率者‼, Seitaikei no Tōsotsu-sha!!); 297. "Endlessly Surrounded!!" (際限なき包囲‼, Saigen Naki Hōi!!); 298. "Warning From an Ancient!!" (太古人の警告‼, Taiko Hito no Keikoku!!); 299. "A Revolt Against Tyranny!!" (圧制への反旗‼, Assei e no Hanki!!); 300. "Fierce Attacks and Roars!!" (猛攻と咆哮‼, Mōkō to Hōkō!!)
34	The King Playing Around!! Ō no Asobi!! (王の遨び!!)	April 3, 2015; 978-4-08-880329-6	June 7, 2016; 978-1-42-158517-8
301. "The King Playing Around!!" (王の遨び!!, Ō no Asobi!!); 302. "The True Form of Treasure Food Pair!!" (食寶ペアの正体!!, Shoku Takara Pea no Shōtai!!); 303. "At the Moment of the Encounter!!" (出会いの瞬間に!!, Deai no shunkan ni!!); 304. "Seed of Courage!!" (勇気の種!!, Yūki no Tane!!); 305. "Playtime Preparations!!" (遊びの準備!!, Asobi no Junbi!!); 306. "Grab the Spark!!" (キッカケを獲れ!!, Kikkake o Tore!!); 307. "Determination to Reenter The Mountain!!" (決意の再入山!!, Ketsui no Sainyū Yama!!); 308. "Advancing at Full Power!!" (歩みフルパワー!!, Ayumi Furu Pawā!!); 309. "A Second Moment!!" (瞬間の再来!!, Shunkan no Sairai!!); 310. "Gong"!!" (ゴング!!, Gongu!!)
35	Saru We Dance!! Saru Uī Dansu!! (サル・ウイー・ダンス!!)	July 3, 2015; 978-4-08-880365-4	August 2, 2016; 978-1-42-158642-7
311. "The Appearing Monster!!" (出ズル化物!!, De Zuru Bakemono!!); 312. "What Do You Want to Eat!!" (何が食いたい!!, Nani Ga Kuitai!!); 313. "That Person!!" (その者!!, Sono Mono!!); 314. "Saru We Dance!!" (サル・ウイー・ダンス!!, Saru Uī Dansu!!); 315. "Musical Performance of 240 Trillion!!" (240兆連弾!!, Ni Hyaku Shi Jū Chō Rendan!!); 316. "Grab Hold!!" (掴ぬ!!, Tsukanu!!); 317. "Your Hand!!" (手を!!, Te o!!); 318. "Going to Tears!!" (涙に崩れて!!, Namida ni Kuzurete!!); 319. "Everyone Going Down the Mountains Together!!" (みんなで下山!!, Min'na de ge Yama!!); 320. "The Actual Eating of the Food Treasure!!" (食寶実食!!, Shoku Takara Jisshoku!!)
36	Deployment!! Sankaitsu!! (散開ツ‼)	September 4, 2015; 978-4-08-880461-3	November 1, 2016; 978-1-42-158705-9
321. "The Reunion Party!!" (再会の宴‼, Saikai no Utage!!); 322. "Seismic Tremor!!" (激震走る‼, Gekishin Hashiru!!); 323. "The Truth of the Nitro!!" (ニトロの真実‼, Nitoro no Shinjitsu!!); 324. "Smiling Departure!!" (笑顔の出発‼, Egao no Shuppatsu!!); 325. "Furious Direct Hit!!" (猛威直撃‼, Mōi Chokugeki!!); 326. "Surprising Combinations!!" (意外な組み合わせ‼, Igaina Kumiawase!!); 327. "Deployment!!" (散開ツ‼, Sankaitsu!!); 328. "The Roof of the Civilization!! (文明の屋根‼, Bunmei no Yane!!); 329. "Thrilled Chefs!!" (血沸く料理人達‼, Chiwaku Shefu-tachi!!); 330. "Meeting and Confrontation!!" (出会いと対決‼, Deai to Taiketsu!!)
37	New Stirring!! Taidou!! (胎動!!)	December 4, 2015; 978-4-08-880517-7	February 7, 2017; 978-1-42-159021-9
331. "Strange Masks!!" (奇妙な仮面!!, Kimyōna Kamen!!); 332. "Chako's Circumstances!!" (チャコの事情!!, Chako no Jijō!!); 333. "1st Round Battle!!" (1回戦!!, ikkaisenn!!); 334. "1-Millimeter Yuda!!" (1ミリのユダ!!, 1-Miri no Yuda!!); 335. "New Stirring!!" (胎動!!, Taidou!!); 336. "What Nakaume Saw!!" (中梅が見たもの!!, Nakaume ga mitamono!!); 337. "Resurrection and Reunion!!" (復活と再会!!, Fukkatsu to Saikai!!); 338. "Joie vs Midora!!" (ジョアvs三虎!!, Joa Bāsasu Midora!!); 339. "The Possibility of Resurrection!!" (復活の可能性!!, Fukkatsu no Kanōsei!!); 340. "The Blue Nitro's Goal!!" (ブルーニトロの目的!!, Burūnitoro no Mokuteki!!)
38	To the Back World!! Ura no Sekai He!! (裏の世界へ!!)	March 4, 2016; 978-4-08-880625-9	May 2, 2017; 978-1-42-159121-6
341. "The Strongest Preying on One Another!!" (最強共の捕食合戦!!, Saikyo Domo no Kuiai!!); 342. "Toriko, Switch On!!" (トリコ、スイッチオン!!, Toriko, Suitchion!!); 343. "The Direct Attack Don!!" (直撃のドン!!, Chokugeki no Don!!); 344. "To the Back World!!" (裏の世界へ!!, Ura no Sekai He!!); 345. "The Truth About the Project!! (プロジェクトの真実!!, Purojekuto no Shinjitsu!!); 346. "To the Golden Cookware!!" (金の調理器具へ!!, Kin no Chōrikigu e!!); 347. "The Knights, Tested!!" (試される騎士!!, Tamesareru Naito!!); 348. "There's Nothing You Can't Eat!!" (食えないものはない!!, Kuenai Mono Ha Nai!!); 349. "The Memories!!" (記憶が!!, Kioku Ga!!)
39	Neo, the Creature!! Neo Sono Seibutsu!! (ネオ、その生物!!)	June 3, 2016; 978-4-08-880685-3	August 1, 2017; 978-1-42-159336-4
350. "The "Waiting" Ingredient!!" (「待つ」食材!!, "Matsu" Shokuzai!!); 351. "Accomplished!!" (果たされる!!, Hatasareru!!); 352. "They're Back!!" (戻った!!, Modotta!!); 353. "To the Main Dish!!" (メインへ!!, Mein e!!); 354. "The Wolf King's Step!!" (狼王の一足!!, Rōō no Hitoashi!!); 355. "Sniffing Contest!!" (嗅ぎくらべ!!, Kagi Kurabe); 356. "Joining Together!!" (合流!!, Gōryū!!); 357. "Neo, the Creature!!" (ネオ、その生物!!, Neo Sono Seibutsu!!); 358. "Neo's Gross!!" (ネオキショい!!, Neo Kishoi!!); 359. "The Name Don Slime!!" (ドン・スライム、その名は!!, Don Suraimu Sononaha!!)
40	Those Tears!! Ano Namida wa!! (あの涙は‼)	August 4, 2016; 978-4-08-880775-1	November 7, 2017; 978-1-42-159440-8
360. "The Smell's True Identity!!" (匂いの正体‼, Nioi no Shōtai!!); 361. "The Lurking Demon!!" (潜む悪魔は‼, Hisomu Akuma wa!!); 362. "Onwards To Complete the Full Course!!" (フルコース完成へ‼, Furukorsu Kansei e!!); 363. "The Don Gets Serious!!" (災害の本気‼, Don no Honki!!); 364. "The Theory!!" (ある考え‼, Aru Kangae!!); 365. "The Wolf Cub!!" (狼の仔‼, Ōkami no Ko!!); 366. "Seal The Wolf!!" (狼に封印を‼, Ōkami ni Fūin wo!!); 367. "Those Tears!!" (あの涙は‼, Ano Namida wa!!); 368. "Give Me That 0.1 Second!!" (0.1秒を私に‼, 0.1 Byō o Watashi ni!!); 369. "What Is GOD!!" (GOD(ゴッド)とは‼, Goddo to wa!!)
41	Battle of the Kings!! Ō-tachi no Tatakai!! (王たちの戦い!!)	October 4, 2016; 978-4-08-880804-8	February 6, 2018; 978-1-4215-9514-6
370. "GOD Almighty!!" (GOD最強!!, Goddo Saikyo!!); 371. "The Confrontation of the Era!!" (時代の対峙!!, Jidai no Taiji!!); 372. "Their Battles!!" (それぞれの会戦!!, Sorezore no Kaisen!!); 373. "Where GOD Leads!!" (GODの示す場所!!, Goddo no Shimesu Basyo!!); 374. "Biting and Biting Back!!" (食い合い!!, Kuiai!!); 375. "They're Rushing!!" (駆けつける者たち!!, Kaketsukeru Mono Tachi!!); 376. "The Eight Kings Assemble!!" (八王集結!!, Yaou Shuuketsu!!); 377. "Battle of the Kings!!" (王たちの戦い!!, Ō-tachi no Tatakai!!); 378. "We'll Fight and Cook Together!!" (共に調理!!, Tomo ni Tatakau!!)
42	A Reunion with Appetite!! Shokuyoku tono Saikai!! (食欲との際会‼)	December 2, 2016; 978-4-08-880844-4	May 1, 2018; 978-1-42-159621-1
379. "To GOD!!" (GODの元へ‼, Goddo no moto he!!); 380. "The Struggle for GOD!!" (GOD争奪戦‼, Goddo Soudatsusen!!); 381. "Neo and Acacia!!" (ネオとアカシア‼, Neo to Akashia!!); 382. "Acacia on the Move!!" (アカシア、動く‼, Akashia Ugoku!!); 383. "Toriko and Starjun!!" (トリコとスタージュン‼, Toriko to Sutājun!!); 384. Joie and Froese!! (ジョアとフローゼ‼, Joa to Furōze!!); 385. Midora's Full Course!! (三虎のフルコース‼, Midora no Furukōsu!!); 386. The Most Fiendish Enemy, Acacia!! (最凶の敵、アカシア‼, Saikyō no Teki, Akashia!!); 387. A Reunion with Appetite!! (食欲との際会‼, Shokuyoku tono Saikai!!)
43	Still Yet Unseen Ingredients!! Mada Minu Shokuzai!! (まだ見ぬ食材‼)	December 31, 2016; 978-4-08-880885-7	August 7, 2018; 978-1-42-159703-4
388. Main Dish!! (メインディッシュ‼, Mein Disshu!!); 389. The Flavor He Can't Stand...!! (奴の苦手な味...‼, Yatsu no Negate na Aji!!); 390. Acacia's Goal...!! (アカシアの狙い...‼, Akashia no Nerai...!!); 391. Acacia vs. Toriko!! (アカシアVSトリコ‼, Akashia Bāsasu Toriko!!); 392. The Full Course of Anger!! (怒りのフルコース‼, Ikari no Furukōsu!!); 393. Acacia's Wishes!! (アカシアの想い‼, Akashia no Omoi!!); 394. Toriko's Full Course!! (トリコのフルコース‼, Toriko no Furukōsu!!); 395. Everyone Gathering Around the Dining Table!! (皆で囲む食卓‼, Mina de Kakomu Shokutaku!!); 396. Still Yet Unseen Ingredients!! (まだ見ぬ食材‼, Mada Minu Shokuzai!!)
