= One Piece season 16 =

Season of television series

One Piece
- Season 16; Punk Hazard
- Cover for the first Japanese DVD compilation of the sixteenth season as released by Avex Pictures
- No. of episodes: 50

Release
- Original network: Fuji Television
- Original release: January 6, 2013 – January 12, 2014

Season chronology
- ← Previous; Season 15 Next → Season 17

The sixteenth season of the One Piece anime television series was produced by Toei Animation, and directed by Hiroaki Miyamoto. The season began broadcasting in Japan on Fuji Television from January 6, 2013, to January 12, 2014. Like the rest of the series, it follows the adventures of Monkey D. Luffy and his Straw Hat Pirates. The first of twelve DVD compilations was released on January 8, 2014, with the last being released on June 4, 2014.

The story arc, called "Punk Hazard" (パンクハザード), adapts material from the end of the 66th volume to the end of the 70th volume of the manga by Eiichiro Oda. The Straw Hats recover a distress signal originating from Punk Hazard. There they discover Caesar Clown, an ex-Navy scientist, experimenting on children. Luffy and the prisoners team up to stop Caesar and his henchmen. An anime original story arc, called "Caesar Retrieval", takes place immediately after the Heart–Hat alliance's departure from Punk Hazard and deals with them rescuing Caesar from a mysterious person in order to take down Doflamingo and Kaido.

Two pieces of theme music are used for the season. The opening themes are "We Go!" (ウィーゴー!) performed by Hiroshi Kitadani, used up until episode 590, and "Hands Up!" performed by Kōta Shinzato (新里 宏太, Shinzato Kōta) for the rest of the season. When the season originally aired "Hands Up!" was not used by Funimation in its simulcast due to licensing issues with the record label. These licensing issues were later resolved and Funimation restored the song for its original release.

== Episodes ==
No. overall (Note: Episode number by Toei Animation's count)	No. in season	Title (Note: Title of the episode: literally translated, romanized using Hepburn romanization, and in kanji form)	Directed by	Written by	Original release date (Note: Date the episode originally aired on Fuji Television)	English air date
Punk Hazard
579	1	"Arriving! A Burning Island - Punk Hazard!"; Transliteration: "Jōriku! Moeru Shima Panku Hazādo" (Japanese: 上陸！燃える島パンクハザード)	Directed by : Ayako Hiraike; Storyboarded by : Naoyuki Itō	Tomohiro Nakayama	January 6, 2013	September 4, 2022
After the events of One Piece Film: Z and the events of One Piece: Adventure of Nebulandia, The Straw Hats arrive at a volcanic island that does not appear on the New World Log Pose. Luffy in his enthusiasm, votes to go to the island, though most of his crew are reluctant to go with him. The crew than receives a distress call from someone on the island who is being attacked by a samurai. They then draw sticks on who will go with Luffy, and who will stay on the ship, with Zoro, Robin, and Usopp coming with Luffy. With the help of Nami's clouds, the scouting group arrives at the main entrance which Zoro cuts down with ease. The group wanders the area seeing the whole place on fire, wondering what happened to the island. Their exploration is suddenly cut short when they encounter a dragon looking hungrily at them. At Raijin Island, Smoker and Tashigi intercept the distress call that Luffy picked up and order the G-5 Marines to set a course for Punk Hazard.
580	2	"A Battle in the Heat! Luffy vs. the Giant Dragon!"; Transliteration: "Shakunetsu no Tatakai! Rufi tai Kyodai Ryū!" (Japanese: 灼熱の戦い！ルフィVS(たい)巨大竜！)	Yutaka Nakashima	Jin Tanaka	January 13, 2013	September 4, 2022
Luffy and Zoro start fighting the dragon, which can speak and breathe fire. Luffy rockets up to the dragon's back, discovering a pair of legs. Luffy gets the dragon to chew its own wing, making it fall. Zoro takes the opportunity to jump into the air with Usopp's trampoline and decapitates the dragon. Meanwhile, Nami, Chopper, Franky, Brook, and Sanji all fall asleep due to sleeping gas and get abducted by men in hazmat suits.
581	3	"The Straw Hats Stunned! Enter: A Samurai's Horrifying Severed Head!"; Transliteration: "Ichimi Sōzen! Shōgeki no Kubi dake Samurai Tōjō!" (Japanese: 一味騒然！衝撃の首だけ侍登場！)	Hiroaki Miyamoto	Yoshiyuki Suga	January 20, 2013	September 11, 2022
Luffy, Zoro, Usopp, and Robin stand near the dead dragon that Zoro killed, with Luffy trying to pull out the man who is stuck in the dragon's back. Luffy succeeds by pulling out only the legs, making everyone think that he killed the man. However, the legs are alive, and they run away trying to look for a Warlord. Luffy runs after him and gets stuck to the legs after they fall on top of him. Elsewhere, the captured Straw Hats (Sanji, Nami, Chopper, and Franky) are in a prison cell and are shown to a gaseous figure known as "Master" who is very interested in Franky. They wake up minutes later in the cell and try to figure out how to get out. They then see a man's head which was cut into pieces and put it together. The head is alive, and it tells them that his body was cut into pieces by a Warlord, and he feels shameful for not getting killed after getting sliced. Back with Luffy's group, Usopp sees a harpy girl on top of a burned down building, but after he yells for everyone to look, she disappears. They then approach a lake that separates the fiery and icy halves of Punk Hazard. Luffy befriends a centaur that thought that Luffy was one of his kind. The people of Punk Hazard who work for Master see Luffy's group and tell the harpy girl about them.
582	4	"Startling! The Secret of the Island Is Finally Revealed!"; Transliteration: "Kyōgaku! Tsui ni Akasareru Shima no Himitsu" (Japanese: 驚愕！遂に明かされる島の秘密)	Yoshihiro Ueda	Tomohiro Nakayama	January 27, 2013	September 11, 2022
Franky, Sanji, Nami, and Chopper are shocked that the samurai survived being cut. He's surprised by Nami's bluntness and revealing outfit but says he likes it, irritating Sanji. When he learns they're pirates, he refuses to go with them, stating he hates pirates and came to the island to find his son. Franky blasts a hole in the wall with his Radical Beam, and they escape into a room full of giant children. Meanwhile, Luffy races a centaur he befriended. Usopp contacts Brook, who reports that Nami, Sanji, Franky and Chopper were captured. The centaur receives a call saying Luffy is an enemy, so Luffy defeats him, and Robin takes out another attacker. The crew notices the Transponder Snails used by the centaurs have "CC" on them. The Master learns the Straw Hats have escaped, that one of them can shoot laser beams like a Pacifista, and that they're in the biscuit room with the giant kids. He also hears that the Marines are arriving and orders poison gas to be released on them. The G-5 Marines begin to suffocate but quickly put on gas masks in order to avoid suffocation. Smoker then reveals this island was where Aokiji and Akainu fought for the title of Fleet Admiral two years ago.
583	5	"Save the Children! The Straw Hats Start to Fight!"; Transliteration: "Kodomo-tachi o Sukue! Ichimi Sentō Kaishi" (Japanese: 子供達を救え！一味戦闘開始)	Aya Komaki	Yoshiyuki Suga	February 3, 2013	September 25, 2022
The Straw Hats who escaped the prison cell end up in the Biscuit Room where they find a group of children. The samurai head scares the children. The hazmat suit guys arrive and attempt to capture the Straw Hats. Meanwhile, in Luffy's group, Usopp makes a banana boat so they can cross the river to the frozen side of Punk Hazard. Then, the centaur whom Luffy beat earlier tells his boss that the Straw Hats are heading to the frozen side of Punk Hazard. Back in Nami's group, the children beg the Straw Hats to save them as they have been on the island for over a year and want to go home. Nami's unwillingness to abandon them convinces the others to rescue them as they fight off the hazmat suit guys.
584	6	"A Swordplay Showdown! Brook vs. the Mysterious Torso Samurai!"; Transliteration: "Kenjutsu Shōbu - Burukku tai Nazo no Dōtai Samurai" (Japanese: 剣術勝負 ブルックVS(たい)謎の胴体侍)	Directed by : Tetsuya Endō; Storyboarded by : Kenji Yokoyama	Jin Tanaka	February 10, 2013	September 25, 2022
The G-5 marines attempt to reach the snow side of Punk Hazard and shoot the ice blocks with cannons to make a path. Luffy, Zoro, Usopp and Robin see the centaurs and Brownbeard and they attempt to attack the Straw Hats. Chopper is fighting off the hazmat suit guys who attempt to get in his, Nami and the children's way. Sanji and Franky continue to fight off the hazmat suit guys and find out that they look like sheep. Brook is fighting off against the samurai's torso and gets scared when he doesn't talk back to him and uses two sword style against Brook. Brook then runs away. One of the hazmat suit guys warns the master that G-5 is almost at shore, who says he doesn't want to handle them. Trafalgar Law, who is with the master, says he will handle them. G-5 finally reach the shore and Smoker rings the doorbell to Vegapunk's lab room. Law opens the doors, and the G-5 marines see him and get scared. Tashigi claims he is now a Warlord because he gave the World Government 100 pirate hearts so he can join their ranks. Smoker says Law is not allowed to be at Punk Hazard even though he is a Warlord. Law replies that Smoker and the marines are not allowed there either.
585	7	"The Warlord! Trafalgar Law!"; Transliteration: "Shichibukai! Torafarugā Rō" (Japanese: 七武海！トラファルガー・ロー)	Directed by : Takahiro Imamura; Storyboarded by : Naotoshi Shida	Tomohiro Nakayama	February 17, 2013	October 2, 2022
Chopper and Nami try to escape with the children and enter a cold room filled with frozen people. Meanwhile, Sanji and Franky defeat the hazmat-suited enemies. Sanji considers killing the samurai for mocking his mercy, then they rush to find Nami, Chopper, and the kids. Luffy, Zoro, Usopp, and Robin are attacked by Brownbeard and the centaurs, but Zoro destroys their cannons while Luffy deflects the rest. Brownbeard orders his men to target the water, but the Straw Hats escape by paddling away. Brook, fleeing from the samurai's torso, watches it get trapped in a snowball rolling toward a lake. Elsewhere, Smoker and Tashigi review a transmission from Luffy and the centaur, supposedly from Punk Hazard. Law claims it's fake, reminding them that the Marines often forge transmissions in order to catch pirates. Sanji's group reaches the exterior of the lab and spots Law, Smoker, Tashigi, and the G-5 Marines. Sanji tells everyone to run. Chopper and Nami suspect Law is responsible for imprisoning the children. Tashigi orders the G-5 to pursue them. Law declares that he won't let the Marines escape and lifts their ship using his Devil Fruit ability. As tensions rise, Smoker warns his men they can't defeat Law and prepares to fight him himself.
586	8	"In a Real Pinch! Luffy Sinks into the Ice-cold Lake!"; Transliteration: "Dai Pinchi - Rufi Gokkan no Mizuumi ni Shizumu" (Japanese: 大ピンチ ルフィ極寒の湖に沈む)	Katsumi Tokoro	Jin Tanaka	March 3, 2013	October 2, 2022
Luffy, Zoro, Usopp and Robin try to get to the frozen side of Punk Hazard, but their ship gets capsized by Brownbeard. As Brownbeard's troops prepare to attack them again, Zoro gets ready to destroy their bullets, but gets dragged down by sharks. At the last second, Brook saves Zoro and defeats Brownbeard's shooters. Once Luffy and the gang get out of the freezing water after killing the sharks, they opt to take the centaur's warm coats. Having realized that the Straw Hats are fighting them, Brownbeard orders an immediate retreat, only to be stopped by Luffy, Zoro, and Robin. Meanwhile, the other Straw Hats attempt to go back into the building to find another escape route, but their "hearts" get switched by Law making them swap bodies: Franky in Chopper's, Chopper in Sanji's, Nami in Franky's and Sanji in Nami's, with Sanji overjoyed to have big breasts. Law then returns his attention to the marines and destroys their ship. The G-5 marines attempt to contact marine headquarters about Law, but he takes away all their Transponder Snails. Smoker then fights Law and warns his men to stay back from the fight to not get cut to pieces (which they do) by Law's Op-Op Fruit powers. Feeling useless in the situation, Tashigi attempts to strike the Warlord but is promptly bisected.
587	9	"A Collision! Law vs. Vice Admiral Smoker!"; Transliteration: "Gekitotsu! Rō tai Sumōkā Chūjō" (Japanese: 激突！ローVS(たい)スモーカー中将)	Naoyuki Itō	Yoshiyuki Suga	March 17, 2013	October 9, 2022
Tashigi, feeling dishonored for surviving, asks Law to kill her. He refuses, saying she has no right to decide how she dies. She attacks with her broken sword but misses, and Law prepares to strike again before Smoker intervenes. They begin a fierce battle as the centaurs reflect on underestimating the Straw Hats, who are now riding Brownbeard toward the facility Brook saw. Inside the lab, a hazmat worker informs the mysterious smoke man that Law and Smoker are fighting, the children escaped with Nami's group, and that Smoker saw them. The smoke man grows angry but decides not to kill Smoker in order to avoid suspicion from the Marines. Monet, a harpy, tells him the Straw Hats have beaten the dragon and centaurs and are approaching. The smoke man decides to eliminate both the Straw Hats and the G-5, then tells Monet to contact Joker. Meanwhile, the children begin realizing that Sanji, Nami, Chopper, and Franky have switched bodies and are getting cold. Sanji, now in Nami's body, jokes about taking pictures. Franky notes it was risky bringing the kids without a plan. At the entrance, Smoker and Law's fight continues as the G-5 watches, confused about Law's motives. Smoker questions Law, who stays silent. During the clash, Law removes Smoker's heart, ending the fight.
588	10	"Meeting Again After Two Years! Luffy and Law!"; Transliteration: "Ni-nen Buri no Saikai! Rufi to Rō" (Japanese: 2(に)年ぶりの再会！ルフィとロー)	Yoshihiro Ueda	Tomohiro Nakayama	March 24, 2013	October 9, 2022
Tashigi tries to see what happened in the fight. Luffy's group sees the flying warship. Luffy sees Law and says thanks for saving him two years ago. Law says that they aren't friends and Luffy agrees since they were both after One Piece. Law remembers the past between him and Luffy when Law saved him at Marineford. Luffy sees Smoker on the ground. Tashigi cries over Smoker's body and attempts to kill Law but he switches their hearts. Meanwhile, the kids from the lab complain about the cold so the samurai uses his devil fruit to give the kids and the Straw Hats warm clothes. Luffy's group then meets up with the other group behind the lab. While going over what happened Robin reveals that Law became a Warlord two years ago and the samurai reveals that Law is the one who cut him in thirds and reunites with his legs. Law meets up with Caesar Clown who Smoker speculates was behind everything on the island.
589	11	"The Worst in the World! A Scientist of Terror - Caesar!"; Transliteration: "Sekai Saiaku - Kyōfu no Kagakusha Shīzā" (Japanese: 世界最悪 恐怖の科学者シーザー)	Tetsuya Endō	Hirohiko Kamisaka	March 31, 2013	October 16, 2022
The G-5 marines discuss that Caesar Clown is probably behind the Island and that the child abduction case in that area could be true. Caesar is dealing with a patient that he says needs to be healed but he sends him to the gas chambers. Brownbeard is tied up and tells Luffy and his crew that the Eleven Supernovas (which Luffy, Zoro and Law are a part of), and Blackbeard are now referred to as the Worst Generation and that Caesar and Law saved him and his men from dying from the poisonous gas and was given the ability to walk again. Smoker tells his men that Caesar was behind the failed experiment and not Vegapunk. Caesar kills his patient with poisonous gas and plans on being the best scientist the world has ever known to surpass Vegapunk himself.
Toriko x One Piece x Dragon Ball Z Collaboration Special
590	12	"History's Strongest Collaboration vs. Glutton of the Sea!"; Transliteration: "Shijō Saikyō Korabo tai Umi no Taishokukan" (Japanese: 史上最強コラボVS(たい)海の大食漢)	Directed by : Yutaka Nakashima; Storyboarded by : Naotoshi Shida	Isao Murayama	April 7, 2013 (Note: This episode originally aired as second half of a one-hour TV special alongside Toriko.)	March 5, 2023
Celebrating Mr. Satan's victory at the IGO tournament, the group discovers that the tournament was planned with the ulterior motive of gathering the world's strongest fighters to capture the legendary Deep Sea Glutton creature Akami, which has the ability to suck the energy out of living things. The Akami appears and attacks Mr. Satan, Usopp and Gohan, poisoning them and absorbing their energy, before disappearing again; This leaves the group with only 30 minutes to find Akami and create an antidote to its poison. After defeating Sanji, Piccolo, Franky, Gotenks and others, Akami evolves into an even more powerful monster, even gaining the ability to absorb and use the power of energy attacks intended to stop it. Luffy and Toriko distract the monster while Goku charges a Spirit Bomb using the energy from everyone at the tournament. This attack, along with a simultaneous finishing move from all three combatants, defeats Akami, and the group resumes their banquet. Neither Zoro, Zebra or Vegeta participate, as they have been fighting each other since the tournament began. Note: This episode is a crossover with Toriko and Dragon Ball Z which continues from Episode 99 of Toriko. Due to licensing restrictions, Funimation skipped this episode in every official release until March 2023.
Punk Hazard
591	13	"Chopper's Fury! The Master's Inhumane Experiment!"; Transliteration: "Choppā Gekido - Masutā Hidōnaru Jikken" (Japanese: チョッパー激怒 M(マスター)非道なる実験)	Aya Komaki	Yoshiyuki Suga	April 14, 2013	October 16, 2022
The children and Straw Hats are in a cave with Brownbeard tied up talking about the Master. Zoro, Sanji and Brook go to look for the samurai, who had gone to look for his torso. The children then start to fall over in pain while asking for candy. Chopper, who tested them for any sickness, reveals that they were drugged and are suffering from withdrawal. They attack the Straw Hats, who can't fight back without injuring the children, so Usopp puts them to sleep. Back in the lab, Law gives Smoker's heart to Caesar, who sent the Yeti Cool Brothers to deal with the Straw Hats. The Brothers are then shown talking to each other while Zoro, Sanji and Brook lie unconscious nearby.
592	14	"To Annihilate the Straw Hats! Legendary Assassins Descend!"; Transliteration: "Ichimi Massatsu! Densetsu no Koroshiya Raishū!" (Japanese: 一味抹殺！伝説の殺し屋来襲！)	Directed by : Takahiro Imamura; Storyboarded by : Keiji Gotoh	Jin Tanaka	April 21, 2013	October 23, 2022
The Yeti Cool Brothers make their way to the destroyed lab where the Straw Hats and the children are. Monet tells Caesar about Law having some relationship with Luffy, which makes Caesar mistrust Law until Law give reassurance. The Yeti Cool Brothers attack the cave and shoot Brownbeard and then take Nami. Luffy arrives and attempts to rescue her but fails. Law is challenged by two of Caesar's men as he leaves and attacks them.
593	15	"Save Nami! Luffy's Fight on the Snow-Capped Mountains!"; Transliteration: "Nami o Sukue! Rufi Yukiyama no Tatakai" (Japanese: ナミを救え！ルフィ雪山の戦い)	Yoshihiro Ueda	Jin Tanaka	April 28, 2013	October 23, 2022
Chopper tells the others that Nami was kidnapped by the Yeti Cool Brothers. Luffy and Franky go after them, but Franky (in Chopper's body) goes against Chopper's warnings and takes a rumble ball, going on a rampage and chasing Luffy. Meanwhile, Caesar notices Vegapunk's beam in Franky's body and craves for it, he calls his men so they go to the fire side gate and see a cave. After Luffy nearly falls into a trap he faces the Yeti Cool Brothers when Franky ending up beating one of them before his rampaging forces Luffy to knock him out. The second brother tries to escape with Nami before Law appears and defeats him. Law then proposes an alliance to take down an Emperor to survive in the New World.
594	16	"Formed! Luffy and Law's Pirate Alliance!"; Transliteration: "Kessei! Rufi to Rō Kaizoku Dōmei!" (Japanese: 結成！ルフィ・(と)ロー海賊同盟！)	Directed by : Ayako Hiraike; Storyboarded by : Kenji Yokoyama	Tomohiro Nakayama	May 5, 2013	November 6, 2022
Luffy and Law agree on an alliance; the rest of the Straw Hats disapprove while Robin approves, even if she warns Luffy about a possible betrayal in a pirate alliance. Law returns Franky and Chopper back to their bodies while Nami ends up in Sanji's body because Sanji is far away with Zoro and Brook. Law tells them that they can't go back once things start moving for example capturing Caesar Clown who has the Gas-Gas Fruit. He warns them that he is highly dangerous therefore, they need Haki users to beat him. Luffy says that the Haki users there are him, Law, Zoro and Sanji. The marines are continuing their fight against Caesar's men. The three centaurs open the door and see a big glop of Slime that seeps out poison gas, most of them die and two survive so they run as it chases them. Caesar calls the pet slime monster Smiley and says that the Straw Hats and the G-5 marines are being used as test subjects for it.
595	17	"Capture M! The Pirate Alliance's Operation Launches!"; Transliteration: "Masutā o Toraero - Kaizoku Dōmei Sakusen Kaishi!" (Japanese: M(マスター)を捉えろ 海賊同盟作戦開始！)	Tetsuya Endō	Yoshiyuki Suga	May 12, 2013	November 13, 2022
Zoro, Brook and Sanji are trying to find the samurai. Earlier they got knocked out by the Yeti Cool Brothers. Caesar's hazmat subordinates attack them but fail. They find the samurai's head and legs frozen and unfreeze him. They see Smiley far away. Smiley is a chemical experiment that caused the explosion in Punk Hazard. Law and Chopper are heading to the lab. Caesar drugged his test subjects to experiment on them. G-5 Marines attempt to break inside lab and then Luffy, Franky and Robin arrive out of nowhere surprising the Marines and Caesar's subordinates.
596	18	"On the Verge of Annihilation! A Deadly Monster Comes Flying In!"; Transliteration: "Zenmetsu no Kiki - Shi no Monsutā Hirai" (Japanese: 全滅の危機 死のモンスター飛来)	Directed by : Takahiro Imamura; Storyboarded by : Kōhei Kureta	Shōji Yonemura	May 19, 2013	November 20, 2022
Luffy declares that he will capture Caesar. Law says he will deal with Monet while Chopper tries to find an antidote. Luffy and his group try to find the entrance to lab. Tashigi and Smoker attack Luffy, with Smoker gaining an advantage until Luffy uses Gear Second and tells Smoker to fight him later when he is at full strength. Back in the lab, the children start to wake up until Usopp puts them to sleep again. They then see pieces of Smiley falling onto the stolen warship. Franky, not being able to find an entrance, uses his Radical Beam to make an opening. The Marines try attacking it but discover that it emits poison gas when they touch it. One of them tries to burn it but it explodes when it catches on fire, destroying the ship. Back in the burning lands, Zoro, Sanji, Brook and The Samurai see Smiley shooting pieces of itself across the lake. Caesar then appears on top of the lab, explaining that Smiley was his experiment and that it is weak against water which is why it is shooting itself across the lake. After his speech, Luffy jumps up and grabs him.
597	19	"An Intense Battle! Caesar Exercises His True Power!"; Transliteration: "Dai-Gekisen - Shīzā Shin no Nōryoku Hatsudō!" (Japanese: 大激戦 シーザー真の能力発動！)	Aya Komaki	Yoshiyuki Suga	May 26, 2013	December 4, 2022
Sanji, Kin'emon, Brook and Zoro see Smiley. Brook talks about a story about slime eating the clothes off of women making everyone act perverted except for Zoro, who points out that the slime is killing the fish in the lake, prompting Sanji to jump in to find the samurai's torso. Law tells Monet to take a walk with him while Chopper is left in the lab to find the antidote. Luffy faces off against Caesar who uses his Gas Robe attack until he discovers that Luffy is immune to poison. Caesar then uses his Gastanets and Smiley to injure Luffy who then grabs Caesar. Caesar then knocks Luffy out with an unknown ability. Robin, Franky, Tashigi and Smoker get knocked out as well. Law and Monet are walking down a hallway and encounter a mysterious figure who causes Law to break down in pain while the mysterious figure tells him that it has been a long time since they last met.
598	20	"A Samurai Who Can Cut Fire! Foxfire Kin'emon!"; Transliteration: "Honoo Kirisaku Samurai! Kitsunebi no Kin'emon" (Japanese: 炎切り裂く侍！狐火の錦えもん)	Directed by : Tetsuya Endō; Storyboarded by : Nobutaka Nishizawa	Tomohiro Nakayama	June 2, 2013	December 11, 2022
Law's heart is crushed by the mysterious man named Vergo who was sent along with Monet to watch over Caesar. Law gets knocked out by Vergo who had a bamboo stick with him imbued with Haki. Caesar tells his men to tie up the Straw Hats and G-5. Meanwhile Chopper is looking for a way to cure the children. Zoro's group are waiting for Sanji to rescue the samurai's torso. Sanji uses Haki to find the body and realizes it is in a shark's mouth. He manages to escape before the gas consumes him. The samurai then reveals himself as Kin'emon. He demonstrates his ability by cutting fire and by destroying the slime. He then attempts to find his son, Momonosuke. Zoro's group decides to aid him.
599	21	"Shocking! The True Identity of the Mystery Man Vergo!"; Transliteration: "Shōgeki! Nazo no Otoko Verugo no Shōtai!" (Japanese: 衝撃！謎の男ヴェルゴの正体！)	Yoshihiro Ueda	Jin Tanaka	June 9, 2013	December 18, 2022
While punishing Law, Vergo is revealed to be the G-5 Marine Base commander. On another island, rude G-5 Marines dismiss citizens searching for missing children, claiming they died at sea based on false information given to them by Vergo, who was covering up their kidnapping as they were in actuality taken to Caesar Clown's lab. Nami and Usopp struggle to help the children through their withdrawal symptoms until Caesar appears and lures them back with drug-laced candy. Meanwhile, Zoro's group faces Smiley, who becomes enraged at Kin'emon for damaging its body and escalates its attacks, forcing them to retreat toward the lab. Luffy, Law, Robin, Franky, Tashigi, and Smoker awaken in a prison cell, where they confront Vergo and Monet. Caesar's men seal off the lab, trapping the G-5 Marines outside with Smiley. Inside, Monet and Vergo discuss Caesar's vague plans. Smoker protests that the G-5 soldiers will die if nothing is done, but Vergo, unconcerned, reveals his true allegiance. Smoker realizes Vergo covered up the child abductions. Law exposes Vergo's past as a pirate and his double agent position for the underworld broker "Joker". When Vergo threatens to kill Tashigi and Smoker to protect his secret, Law reveals Joker's true identity: the Warlord Donquixote Doflamingo.
600	22	"Save the Children! The Master's Evil Hands Close In!"; Transliteration: "Kodomo-tachi o Mamore! Semaru Masutā no Ma no Te" (Japanese: 子供達を守れ！迫るM(マスター)の魔の手)	Ayako Hiraike	Shōji Yonemura	June 16, 2013	January 8, 2023
As Luffy and Law remain captive in Caesar's lab along with the others who were captured, Caesar Clown goes to retrieve the children from the remaining Straw Hats. Meanwhile, Zoro's group are still running from the slime monster who had finally transferred itself to the ice lands, causing all of its pieces to converge together. At the ruined Lab, Usopp and Nami were confronted by Caesar who mercilessly suffocated them the same way he did to Luffy but was interrupted by the revived Brownbeard, who demanded his crew back. However, Caesar beats him and proceeds to do the same to the two escaping Straw Hats. With the children secured and returning to the lab, Caesar Clown sent orders to Monet to prepare the Transponder Snail to broadcast his "special experiment" to all known brokers to show them his weapon of mass destruction, among the viewers were the two supernovas, Eustass Kid and Killer.
601	23	"Shaking Up the New World! Caesar's Horrendous Experiment!"; Transliteration: "Shin Sekai Gekishin - Shīzā Akumu no Jikken" (Japanese: 新世界激震 シーザー悪夢の実験)	Directed by : Takahiro Imamura; Storyboarded by : Keiji Gotoh	Tomohiro Nakayama	June 23, 2013	January 15, 2023
At the lab, the G-5 Marine soldiers are banging on the door, demanding entry. Meanwhile, the children were returned to the Lab where Caesar ordered his subordinates to make sure they didn't escape again. However, Mocha begins to regain her senses, seeing Caesar's subordinates as monsters. Within Caesar's private quarters, Vergo and Monet are waiting for Caesar's return. As soon as he arrived, he revealed that he made a deal with Law in the past to give his heart to him, and in exchange, he would get to keep Monet's. He shows Law that Vergo is now in possession of his heart while he himself has Smoker's heart, but before he tortures him, Monet informs Caesar that the broadcast is ready. In the broadcast, it is shown that a very large candy is being offered to Smiley, which is a deadly weaponized gas known as Shinokuni (The Land of the Dead). Caesar then ordered the men who brought the candy to quickly return to the Lab. As Zoro's Group is being chased by Smiley, the poison beast sees the candy and promptly swallows it, ignoring the false heartfelt words from Caesar. He then laughs as everyone watching the broadcast sees the creature behaving strangely.
602	24	"The Deadliest Weapon of Mass Destruction in History! Land of the Dead!"; Transliteration: "Shijō Saiaku no Satsuriku Heiki! Shinokuni" (Japanese: 史上最悪の殺戮兵器！シノクニ)	Takashi Ōtsuka	Yoshiyuki Suga	June 30, 2013	January 22, 2023
After Smiley swallows the over-sized candy, the candy coat dissolves revealing a special drug designed to convert the entire content of Smiley's body into a "perfect" weapon of destruction, Shinokuni. In the process, Smiley dies and in a sack of apples, an apple turns into a Devil Fruit. The beast's body transforms into poison gas spreading quickly throughout the island. Its lethal power was demonstrated when Caesar's men were caught in it, being petrified before the eyes of the Brokers and the captive Straw Hats. Zoro's team are seen desperately trying to outrun the approaching gas while Nami and Usopp help Brownbeard after their vicious attack by Caesar. At the Lab, Caesar reveals to his captives that they will get to experience the poison gas as well, moving them outside dangling in a cave. In spite of their situation, Law told Luffy that their original plan will still carry on and that it is time to strike back at Caesar.
603	25	"Launching the Counter Attack! Luffy and Law's Great Escape!"; Transliteration: "Hangeki Kaishi! Rufi to Rō Dai-Dasshutsu" (Japanese: 反撃開始！ルフィ・(と)ロー大脱出)	Aya Komaki	Jin Tanaka	July 7, 2013	January 29, 2023
As the Underworld Brokers watched the video feed of the captive Straw Hats and Marines, Eustass Kid (whose has a mechanical prosthetic left arm) and Killer decided to ignore it for more important matters, such as forming an alliance between the Kid Pirates, On Air Pirates and the Hawkins Pirates. Law then decided to set his plan into motion and orders Franky to blow a fireball at a destroyed ship, creating enough smoke to block the cage from being seen from outside. Law then breaks free, explaining that he switched the sea prism stones with fakes during his stay on the island, and proceeds to free the others and restoring Tashigi and Smoker in their own bodies while securing their aid. Franky however had to leave them and protect the Thousand Sunny. Meanwhile, Zoro and Nami's group are still running away from Shinokuni, and they manage to join up while escaping. Luffy's group managed to enter the lab with the aid of Law, and they opened the gate, allowing the G-5 Marines to get in before closing the gate, but the rest of the Straw Hats were still outside. Seeing their only chance of hope closing, Zoro and Kin'emon effortlessly cut the gate open, getting everyone inside safely.
604	26	"Get to Building R! The Pirate Alliance's Great Advance!"; Transliteration: "Mezase Āru-tō! Kaizoku Dōmei Kai-Shingeki!" (Japanese: めざせR(アー)棟！海賊同盟快進撃！)	Tetsuya Endō	Jin Tanaka	July 14, 2013	February 12, 2023
The Straw Hats and Brownbeard escape into the lab but leave behind a hole, allowing the deadly gas of Shinokuni to seep in. The G-5 Marines frantically seal it off with wood and metal as the gas spreads across the island. Brook uses his Devil Fruit power to scout outside as a soul and observes that the land now resembles the "land of the dead". Once composed, the G-5 Marines turn on the Straw Hats, preparing to arrest them. Nami demands that Law switch her and Sanji's bodies back to normal. Sanji privately refuses, but Law complies anyways and uses Shambles to return their hearts back where they belong. Nami, noticing she's now wearing a different coat since the original switch, punches Sanji for allegedly peeping. Law warns they have only two hours to escape and explains that the only safe exit is through passage R-66 in Room R. The Marines hesitate but follow orders once Smoker backs Law up. Smoker then tells Tashigi to lead the men and rescue the children while he goes to confront Vergo. Elsewhere, Caesar Clown celebrates what he assumes is a successful test of Shinokuni — until he discovers that the bodies he was expecting aren't there. He panics upon learning that the Straw Hats and G-5 Marines broke into the lab. As Luffy charges forward to fight Caesar, Zoro reminds him not to let his guard down in the New World.
605	27	"Tashigi's Tears! G-5's Desperate Breakthrough Plan!"; Transliteration: "Tashigi no Namida - Jī-Faibu Kesshi no Toppa Sakusen" (Japanese: たしぎの涙 G5(ジー・ファイブ)決死の突破作戦)	Yoshihiro Ueda	Tomohiro Nakayama	July 21, 2013	March 5, 2023
Caesar Clown, incensed with the humiliation that his prisoners escaped and are inside his lab, orders the passage between building A and B to be closed and Shinokuni to be let in to kill the intruders. Vergo, however decided to take care of them himself. Chopper, who was eavesdropping, sneaks out and tries to find his way to the children within the labyrinth that is the lab. Luffy, Smoker and Law were the first to cross the gate before the alarm sounded, indicating the gate is beginning to close. Tashigi instead heard the alarm and quickly ordered the G-5 marines to let the Straw Hats go and hurry towards the closing gate. When a wall was blown up in building A, Shinokuni flows in petrifying some marines while the rest hasten their escape. The Straw Hats and most of the marines got through the gate safety but a few stayed behind to help Tashigi across before the gate closes, losing themselves to the poison gas while their captain watches in horror. Caesar, angered that they survived, promised that no one will escape this lab alive.
606	28	"The Treacherous Vice Admiral! Demon Bamboo Vergo!"; Transliteration: "Uragiri no Chūjō! Kichiku no Verugo" (Japanese: 裏切りの中将！鬼竹のヴェルゴ)	Directed by : Takahiro Imamura; Storyboarded by : Nobutaka Nishizawa	Shōji Yonemura	July 28, 2013	March 12, 2023
Though most of the G-5 Marines got through the gate safely, they were attacked by the small dragon who after a while flew away in fear. The marines cheered as their beloved Vice Admiral Vergo shows up but that turned to horror when he brutally assaulted them. Tashigi tries to defend them from him but was viciously struck down. That action was enough to cause Sanji to come to the rescue, claiming he heard her tears falling. The Straw Hats (minus Sanji) and Brownbeard were still heading towards the end of the passage until the small dragon shows up and begins to attack them while Brownbeard suggests that he keeps running. Chopper manages to run into Mocha who was still hallucinating and manages to defeat the soldiers trying to apprehend her and give her a sedative to calm her down. Chopper then pleaded for her help to prevent the other children from eating the drugged candy. Meanwhile, Luffy and Smoker were racing towards building C where they believed Caesar and Vergo were located. They entered the private room where Caesar was angrily ordering Monet to release the poison gas on the marines only to turn around in shock of seeing Luffy fist buried in his stomach, who declared that he won't let Caesar escape again.
607	29	"A Fierce Battle Gets Heated! Luffy vs. Caesar!"; Transliteration: "Hakunetsu no Gekisen - Rufi tai Shīzā" (Japanese: 白熱の激戦 ルフィVS(たい)シーザー)	Takashi Ōtsuka	Yoshiyuki Suga	August 11, 2013	March 12, 2023
Luffy finally reaches Caesar's room and immediately punches the scientist, while Smoker leaves in order to find Vergo. Meanwhile, Sanji faces off Vergo while the passage between buildings A and B is closing and the previous one is opening, letting the poison gas enter. During the fight with Caesar, he tries to drain the oxygen in the area to kill Luffy but fails once he enters Gear Second and use some attacks with Haki, making the scientist angry to the point of using some techniques as oxygen-made sword and fire bursts. Meanwhile, both Sanji and Vergo start running away from the gas. During this fight, Trafalgar Law makes his way to building D, where the SAD is made and Monet decides to enter the fight to protect Caesar, while he flies away, and reveals her snow abilities.
608	30	"A Mastermind Underground! Doflamingo Makes His Move!"; Transliteration: "Yami no Kuromaku! Dofuramingo Ugoku!" (Japanese: 闇の黒幕！ドフラミンゴ動く！)	Masahiro Hosoda	Shōji Yonemura	August 18, 2013	March 19, 2023
Law walks into the SAD Room. The door closes on Section A, and it turns out Sanji is still alive. Tashigi tells the marines that the Vergo who attacked them is fake so that they could proceed with the mission. Vergo speaks with Doflamingo about Law while Baby 5 attacks him. Doflamingo stops her from attacking him and informs Caesar, Vergo, and Monet about Luffy's determination. Monet shows off her Snow-Snow Fruit powers to Luffy. Chopper keeps the drugged children busy so that Mocha can run off to stop the drug. The rest of the Straw Hats are busy escaping section B. Kin'emon and Brook cut down the dragon. A little girl tells the two hazmat suit guys that Momonosuke entered the secret room and turned into a dragon.
609	31	"Luffy Dies from Exposure?! The Spine-chilling Snow Woman Monet!"; Transliteration: "Rufi Tōshi!? Kyōfu no Yuki-On'na Mone!" (Japanese: ルフィ凍死!? 恐怖の雪女モネ！)	Aya Komaki	Tomohiro Nakayama	August 25, 2013	March 26, 2023
Chopper, in Monster Point, tries to hold the children for a while, however, can't do it without harming them, so he eventually fails and returns to his normal form. Meanwhile, Luffy faces Monet off and almost dies in the battle, due to having his body frozen, but recovers and counters with Haki. The counterattack, however, made a hole in the floor, leading to the garbage room, where Luffy fell to, and Monet gives farewell to him, as "he can only escape flying". Trafalgar Law prepares to attack the SAD Room, but is confronted by Vergo, who gives critical punches with his Haki-powered fists and bamboo. In the biscuit room, Monet prevents Mocha from fleeing with the candy, and the Straw Hats also help Mocha. After seriously wounding Law, Vergo is confronted by Vice-Admiral Smoker, who prepares to fight the other Vice-Admiral.
610	32	"Fists Collide! A Battle of the Two Vice Admirals!"; Transliteration: "Butsukaru Kobushi! Futari no Chūjō no Tatakai" (Japanese: ぶつかる拳！二人の中将の戦い)	Directed by : Yoshihiro Ueda; Storyboarded by : Kenji Yokoyama	Jin Tanaka	September 1, 2013	April 2, 2023
Smoker and Vergo begin their fight in the SAD Room. At the same time, Sanji, Tashigi, and the G-5 Marines are running through the battle torn B-block when a gas tank explodes, causing Shinokuni to be let in. Caesar Clown, sitting on the second floor of R-block with his subordinates in Vegapunk's old room, instructs that the doors to C and D-blocks be closed, driving everyone to the first floor of R-block where a trap is ready to expose them to Shinokuni. When one of Caesar's subordinates questions the nature of the gas, Caesar then makes a speech to his subordinates, saying that the poisonous gas bomb four years ago was Vegapunk's doing, and that Caesar tried to stop him. However, in a flashback it is revealed that Caesar constructed the weapon himself, and when he was told to stop and banished from the science squad, he set it off. While the gates to C and D-blocks are closed, Luffy meets a small dragon who can talk.
611	33	"A Small Dragon! Momonosuke Appears!"; Transliteration: "Chiisana Doragon! Momonosuke Arawaru" (Japanese: 小さなドラゴン！モモの助現る)	Directed by : Takahiro Imamura; Storyboarded by : Nobutaka Nishizawa	Yoshiyuki Suga	September 8, 2013	April 9, 2023
Luffy meets Momonosuke in the garbage dump of Block C. In a flashback, Momonosuke didn't want the candy Caesar gave out to the children and he got hungry, so he ate a devil fruit which turned him into a dragon. Momonosuke tell Luffy he wants to tell the other children of Caesar's true nature after overhearing him admitting to using the children as test subjects. Luffy and Momonsuke take off after the latter's hunger causes him to hallucinate Doflamingo and fly off with Luffy hanging on. Kin'emon, Usopp and Brook look for sea stone handcuffs. Smoker continues his fight with Vergo. Nami, Robin, Zoro and Chopper are going after the children. Robin gets stabbed by Monet in the arm and Zoro defends the Straw Hats against Monet.
612	34	"A Deadly Fight in a Blizzard! The Straw Hats vs. the Snow Woman!"; Transliteration: "Fubuki no Shitō - Mugiwara no Ichimi tai Yuki-On'na" (Japanese: 吹雪の死闘 麦わらの一味VS(たい)雪女)	Ayako Hiraike	Jin Tanaka	September 15, 2013	April 16, 2023
Mocha runs off with the drug-laced candy, trying to keep it from the other children who are in a frenzy. In a flashback, she and Sind were on a ship fleeing the poison gas. Mocha cried about missing her family, and Sind tried to comfort her, though he cried too. Caesar later found them and lied, claiming his own son died from the gas and that he wanted to save children from the same fate. As Mocha tries to protect the others, Monet recalls introducing new children in another flashback. Zoro fights Monet while Nami, Robin, and Chopper pursue Mocha. Monet uses her snow powers to attack, but Zoro blocks her strike meant for Nami. She aims to eliminate the weaker Straw Hats as a tactical move. Monet entraps them with a snow wall and nearly bites Nami, but Robin stops her. Zoro then opens a path for the others to escape. Elsewhere, Luffy and Momonosuke fall back down the garbage chute. Caesar watches the chaos and sees Shinokuni entering the lab as part of his plan, expecting everyone to die soon. Usopp, Kin'emon, and Brook flee the gas while searching for seastone cuffs and Momonosuke. Monet questions why Zoro won't attack her. Sanji and the G-5 arrive, with Sanji teasing Zoro before admiring Monet — until she bites some Marines, causing panic. Sanji flees with the G-5, but Tashigi stays to help Zoro battle Monet.
613	35	"Showing Off His Techniques! Zoro's Formidable One-Sword Style!"; Transliteration: "Ōgi Sakuretsu! Zoro Saikyō no Ittō-ryū!" (Japanese: 奥義炸裂！ゾロ最強の一刀流！)	Yoshihiro Ueda	Tomohiro Nakayama	September 22, 2013	April 23, 2023
Mocha is still running away with the candy, and the kids are chasing her. Chopper, Nami, and Robin come to her and the children's aid. Then, G-5 and Sanji goes in their direction. At the Biscuit Room, Tashigi battles Monet alone after making Zoro stay out of it, due to believing through their past encounters that Zoro can't cut women. Believing that she found Zoro's weakness Monet continues her assault and almost breaks Tashigi's shoulder with her snow powers, but Zoro comes in and vertically splits Monet in half with a powerful One Sword Style technique, shocking both her and Tashigi. Despite being unable to reform due to her fear knowing Zoro would've killed her if he'd used Haki, Monet tries to use one-half of her body to attack Zoro from behind but is promptly cut down by Tashigi. At the bottom of the C building, Luffy barely manages to hold onto a small ledge and begins to climb out, carrying an unconscious Momonosuke up the chute.
614	36	"To Save Her Friends! Mocha Runs at the Risk of Her Life!"; Transliteration: "Tomodachi o Mamoru! Mocha Inochi-gake no Tōsō" (Japanese: 友達を守る！モチャ命がけの逃走)	Aya Komaki	Shōji Yonemura	September 29, 2013	April 30, 2023
Mocha runs away with the candy while the children are on hot pursuit. Chopper, Nami and Robin try to fend off the children, but they manage to break through them making Mocha leave herself with no choice but to eat the candy. She eats the candy and Chopper watches in horror. Zoro and Tashigi are running away from the poisonous gas while Tashigi wake up and admires Zoro's sword, Shusui which he got from Ryuma at Thriller Bark. Chopper walks on over to Mocha to check and see if she is still alive and Mocha wanted to save her friends, so she sacrificed herself for them. In a flashback, Chopper is holding off the children by closing the door while Mocha is supposed to run away. Mocha hesitates to run off, but Chopper explains the situation to her. Luffy and Momonosuke finally got out of the garbage chute and immediately ran into Caesar's subordinates who quickly recognize Luffy. Luffy uses Conqueror's Haki to knock most of them out when they were about to attack them, and he asked one of them where Caesar is.
615	37	"Brownbeard in Grief! Luffy Lands a Furious Blow!"; Transliteration: "Chahige Hitsū! Rufi Ikari no Ichigeki" (Japanese: 茶ひげ悲痛！ルフィ怒りの一撃)	Tetsuya Endō	Hirohiko Kamisaka	October 6, 2013	May 7, 2023
Zoro carries Tashigi away from the poisonous gas. Sanji and the G-5 marines continue to assist Chopper vaccinate the children. Usopp finds a door that leads to the room where Caesar and his subordinates are watching the Straw Hats and the Marines on a screen. Caesar notices Brownbeard on the screen and confronts him. Brownbeard tells Caesar that he wants to get his crew back, but Caesar tells him they were all killed by the poison gas. Brownbeard tries to warn Caesar's subordinates, but Caesar drugs him to keep him quiet. Caesar orders his subordinates to get rid of Brownbeard, and they fire at him. Luffy arrives just in time and punches Caesar, before asking him about the island. Caesar tells him Punk Hazard is not supposed to exist, and nobody is supposed to know what happens on that island. Vergo covers up any information about that island and anything that happens there – the SAD production is run by Doflamingo, and SAD produces SMILE, an artificial Zoan Devil Fruit. One of the Emperors is forming an army of people who have eaten these artificial fruits. Caesar challenges Luffy to dare pick a fight with such people, only for Luffy to punch Caesar, and tell him that he has been picking fights all along.
616	38	"A Surprising Outcome! White Hunter vs. Vergo!"; Transliteration: "Shōgeki no Ketchaku! Sumōkā tai Verugo!" (Japanese: 衝撃の決着！白猟(スモーカー)VS(たい)ヴェルゴ！)	Takashi Ōtsuka	Yoshiyuki Suga	October 13, 2013	May 14, 2023
Caesar tells Luffy to not underestimate Doflamingo, but Luffy keeps on attacking Caesar. Smoker continues his fight with Vergo. The Straw Hats, G-5 marines and the children run from the gas and continue to head towards building R-66. Caesar's subordinates find Usopp and attempt to attack him. After being told Momonosuke turned into a dragon Kin'emon runs back to Building B, believing the dragon he and Brook killed was him with Brook trying to stop him as the room is now filled with poison gas. Vergo beats Smoker but Smoker manages to retrieve Law's heart and gives it back to him. Law tells Doflamingo he is going to defeat Vergo. Doflamingo tells Law to not underestimate Vergo because of his Haki. Vergo imbues Haki onto his whole body and attempts to kill Law but Law cuts him in half along with the SAD and the island. Law tells Doflamingo that he and the supernovas are going to be the leaders of the new era.
617	39	"Caesar's Defeat! The Powerful Grizzly Magnum!"; Transliteration: "Shīzā Gekiha! Saikyō no Gurizurī Magunamu" (Japanese: シーザー撃破！最強の灰熊銃(グリズリー・マグナム))	Masahiro Hosoda	Shōji Yonemura	October 20, 2013	May 21, 2023
The kids stopped because they are tired and scared of running. Vergo attempts to kill Law even though he is cut down. The Straw Hats convinced the children to run, and they continue to escape the poison gas. Caesar tells his subordinates to release the poison gas into building R-66. Caesar consumes the gas and becomes a big monster. He then consumes his subordinates to intimidate Luffy. Usopp tells Caesar's subordinates that Luffy will never betray his crew. Luffy defeats Caesar with Grizzly Magnum and sends him flying away.
618	40	"Raid! An Assassin from Dressrosa!"; Transliteration: "Shūrai! Doresurōza kara no Shikaku" (Japanese: 襲来！ドレスローザからの刺客)	Directed by : Yoshihiro Ueda; Storyboarded by : Nobutaka Nishizawa	Tomohiro Nakayama	October 27, 2013	June 4, 2023
Luffy defeats Caesar and sends him flying out of the facility. Chopper's group runs into Brook carrying the petrified Kin'emon. The Straw Hats, G-5, the children and Law made it to Building R-66 where they prepare to leave the building. Baby 5 and Buffalo arrive via the latter's Spin-Spin Fruit powers allowing him to turn any part of his body into a propeller, and spot Caesar and attempt to rescue him after contacting Doflamingo. Franky then spots the two from the deck of the SAD tanker.
619	41	"Running Wild! Invincible General Franky!"; Transliteration: "Ō-abare! Muteki no Furankī Shōgun" (Japanese: 大暴れ！無敵のフランキー将軍)	Aya Komaki	Hirohiko Kamisaka	November 3, 2013	June 11, 2023
Franky begins to attack the two Donquixote pirates who retaliate with Baby 5 turning into weapons with her Arms-Arms Fruit powers and Buffalo launching her at their robot foe. Caesar Clown regains consciousness and, after realizing his defeat remembers he still possesses Smoker's heart and prepares to stab it. Inside Room R, the Straw Hats and everyone else are waiting for their comrades to return with Mocha before riding the transport cart out of the collapsing building. They managed to reach the group at the same time Usopp returned with Sea Stone handcuffs and the former subordinates of Caesar Clown. Momonosuke however was shockingly alarmed to see his father petrified. In Dressrosa, Doflamingo sent his farewells to Vergo and Monet who survived her encounter with Tashigi and Zoro. Doflamingo then asks Monet to activate the island's self-destruct, but Monet tells him that she is already doing that. With the island's destruction in her hands, Monet says her goodbyes as she reaches for the switch. Moments later a massive explosion rocks the entire mountain base.
620	42	"A Critical Situation! Punk Hazard Explodes!"; Transliteration: "Zettai Zetsumei! Panku Hazādo Dai-bakuhatsu" (Japanese: 絶体絶命！パンクハザード大爆発)	Ayako Hiraike	Jin Tanaka	November 10, 2013	June 18, 2023
Monet is moments away from activating the self-destruct button when she feels her heart being stabbed and collapses. At the same time, Caesar Clown stabs the heart believing it to be Smoker's. The Straw Hats are still racing towards the exit of the collapsing lab when they feel the explosion of the SAD room and then see Shinokuni on their trail. Smoker, seeing that they nearly reached safety, questions Trafalgar Law as to why he possessed his heart the whole time. Law reveals the clever deception he played on the mad scientist where he returned Monet's heart to Caesar without him knowing. At the tanker, Baby 5's Missile Girl attack failed to take down the Franky Shogun and their duel continued whereas Buffalo contacted Doflamingo of the situation. After confirming that the island wasn't destroyed as intended, Doflamingo decided to tend to the matter himself and is seen somehow flying over the sea towards Punk Hazard.
621	43	"Capture Caesar! General Cannon Blasts!"; Transliteration: "Shīzā o Hokaku-seyo - Jeneraru Kyanon Sakuretsu" (Japanese: シーザーを捕獲せよ 将軍砲(ジェネラルキャノン)炸裂)	Yoshihiro Ueda	Yoshiyuki Suga	November 17, 2013	June 25, 2023
General Franky puts up a good fight against Buffalo and Baby 5. He sends them flying away with a General Cannon (a land-based version of the Sunny's Goan Cannon), but the two refuse to stay defeated despite their injuries. The fight however was interrupted with the arrival of the mine cart filled with all of the lab escapees. Seeing that Law is allied with the enemy and that the odds are against them, the two decided to hightail out of Punk Hazard along with Caesar Clown in their possession. Before Law could stop them, Luffy told Law that Usopp and Nami would handle this. The two Straw Hats proved Luffy right as they easily stopped the fleeing pirates and succeeded in capturing Caesar Clown. Doflamingo is still flying toward Punk Hazard imagining what torture he would inflict on the brats. Meanwhile, on a giant penguin, a mysterious man is wondering which direction leads to Punk Hazard.
622	44	"A Touching Reunion! Momonosuke and Kin'emon!"; Transliteration: "Kandō no Saikai! Momonosuke to Kin'emon" (Japanese: 感動の再会！モモの助と錦えもん)	Directed by : Tetsuya Endō; Storyboarded by : Tetsuro Kodama	Shōji Yonemura	November 24, 2013	July 9, 2023
The Straw Hat Pirates and the Marines are about to enjoy a large dish prepared by Sanji, though the Marines are still adamant in keeping themselves from being friends with pirates. While the stove is being constructed, many events occur; Kin'emon is alive the whole time, Law removes the drug from the children, Momonosuke's human form is revealed, Nami complies with Tashigi's plea to let her take care of the children, Mocha has recovered fully from the drug overdose and the poison gas is revealed to be lethal after a full day's effect. While the group celebrates their victory, Smoker talks with Law about him manipulating Luffy, but Law says that it is the other way around. Previously, during their encounter in the mountains, Law revealed his goal to defeat Kaido with Luffy's help, but Luffy expressed his desire to defeat all four of the Emperors.
623	45	"It's Time to Say Goodbye! Leaving Punk Hazard!"; Transliteration: "Sekibetsu no Toki - Panku Hazādo Shukkō!" (Japanese: 惜別の時 パンクハザード出航！)	Directed by : Takahiro Imamura; Storyboarded by : Kenji Yokoyama	Tomohiro Nakayama	December 1, 2013	July 16, 2023
The Straw Hats, Kin'emon, Momonosuke, G-5, and the rescued children enjoy a lighthearted feast, while Law and Smoker talk privately. A flashback reveals Law and Luffy's true goal: to form an alliance and take down one of the Four Emperors, Kaido of the Beasts. As the Straw Hats prepare to leave, they say goodbye to the children. However, the G-5 Marines put up a barricade and insult the pirates, insisting that the children shouldn't admire them. Though the kids cry and beg to say goodbye, the Marines claim that if they stop the insults, they'll start liking the pirates — something they don't want. Tashigi protests but is overruled. Despite the harsh send-off, the children remain thankful towards the Straw Hats. Back on the Thousand Sunny, Zoro questions why Law is joining them. Usopp explains that Luffy agreed to something that'll bring them trouble once again. Meanwhile, Doflamingo, flying through the sky, spots a life raft carrying the severed heads of Baby 5 and Buffalo, plus a Transponder Snail resembling Law. Through it, Law reveals they've taken Caesar Clown and warns Doflamingo that without Caesar, he can't produce SMILEs — which will anger Kaido and bring about his demise. Law demands that he resign his position as a Warlord by morning or end up losing Caesar permanently. Furious, Doflamingo curses Law as the call ends.
624	46	"The G-5 Wiped Out! Doflamingo's Sudden Attack!"; Transliteration: "Jī-Faibu Kaimetsu! Dofuramingo Kyūshū!" (Japanese: G5(ジー・ファイブ)壊滅！ドフラミンゴ急襲！)	Masahiro Hosoda	Jin Tanaka	December 8, 2013	July 23, 2023
On Punk Hazard, Caesar's former minions go in search of those who were petrified by Shinokuni. All of a sudden, Doflamingo appears from the sky and throws Baby 5 and Buffalo's heads back onto their body. Before any of the G-5 soldiers could attack, Doflamingo used Conqueror's Haki and knocked out a very large majority of them. Even then, the remaining soldier couldn't move because of his devil fruit powers. Doflamingo even has some of the G-5 soldiers kill each other demanding the whereabouts of Law. Smoker steps into the fight, launching White Blow at Doflamingo. As the fight progressed, some G-5 soldiers decided to aid Smoker. Doflamingo moved to confront the soldiers, but his attack hit Smoker instead as he was moving to defend the soldiers and was severely injured. On the Sunny, Luffy asks why they are going to Dressrosa. Law states he has business to attend to. All of a sudden, the sea currents start to shift at an angle as they slide down a sea slope. After they get out of rough water, Luffy explains to the crew about the alliance and the plan to kill Kaido. Back on Punk Hazard, Doflamingo is about to unleash the final blow onto Smoker. Then, Kuzan appears and asks Doflamingo to step aside as Smoker's friend.
625	47	"Intense! Aokiji vs. Doflamingo!"; Transliteration: "Kinpaku! Aokiji tai Dofuramingo" (Japanese: 緊迫！青キジVS(たい)ドフラミンゴ)	Tetsuya Endō	Yoshiyuki Suga	December 15, 2013	July 30, 2023
Doflamingo prepares to finish Smoker off but is stopped by Kuzan's ice which freezes everything around the Warlord, including himself. But he manages to break free from the ice before freezing completely. After some talk, Doflamingo leaves with Baby 5 and Buffalo back to Dressrosa, as Kuzan asks for G-5 to treat Smoker. After getting treated, Smoker starts talking with Kuzan about the Marines and Underworld, insinuating that the former Admiral has "business unseen to the government". At the Thousand Sunny, Law tells some details about the recently formed pirate alliance, which makes some of them afraid of being targeted by an Emperor due to holding Caesar Clown captive. After having some fun, Momonosuke is introduced to the Straw Hats ship by Nami, which makes Sanji, Kin'emon, and Brook jealous of his "luck" with women. At night, a mysterious figure is seen making contact with Kung-Fu Dugongs that have just found the Straw Hat pirates.
Caesar Retrieval
626	48	"Caesar Goes Missing! The Pirate Alliance Makes a Sortie!"; Transliteration: "Kieta Shīzā! Kaizoku Dōmei Shutsugeki" (Japanese: 消えたシーザー！海賊同盟出撃)	Takashi Ōtsuka	Jin Tanaka	December 22, 2013	August 6, 2023
As the Straw Hats relax as they leave Punk Hazard far behind, they stay prepared in case of Doflamingo's return. During the dead of night, a group of sea creatures led by a pirate named Breed attacks and abducts Caesar and takes him to his island-sized ship. When Luffy, Law, and Chopper set out in the Shark Submerge III to retake Ceasar, Law identifies the creatures as Sea Lapahns. When they arrive on the ship they are attacked by the Sea Lapahns, as well as an octopus boxer, black belt penguin, sumo capybara, and a Kung-Fu Dugong that can use Haki. After beating then it is revealed the Kung-Fu Dugong is the same one that became Luffy's disciple in Alabasta. With Chopper translating the Kung-Fu Dugong explains that after being inspired by Luffy he set out to sea and started a pirate crew with the other animals but were enslaved by Breed shortly after arriving in the New World. Breed appears and throws slime that forms a collar around Chopper's neck and forces him to attack Luffy and Law. Breed explains his Pet-Pet Fruit powers allow him to control anything he puts his collars on, before collaring Luffy and Law as well.
627	49	"Luffy Dies at Sea?! The Pirate Alliance Comes Apart!"; Transliteration: "Rufi Umi ni Shisu!? Kaizoku Dōmei Hōkai" (Japanese: ルフィ海に死す!? 海賊同盟崩壊)	Aya Komaki	Tomohiro Nakayama	January 5, 2014	August 13, 2023
Breed reveals that he plans to turn every human into an animal through the artificial Devil Fruit. Breed commands Luffy and Law to fight each other in a stadium-like place, while Dugong begs him to make them stop. Breed accepts his offer and makes Dugong fight Luffy and Law instead. Luffy and Law fall into the ocean after getting punched off the ship by the Kung-Fu Dugong.
628	50	"A Major Turnaround! Luffy's Angry Iron Fist Strikes!"; Transliteration: "Dai-gyakuten! Sakuretsu Rufi Ikari no Tekken" (Japanese: 大逆転！炸裂ルフィ怒りの鉄拳)	Ayako Hiraike	Jin Tanaka	January 12, 2014	August 20, 2023
Chopper and Dugong attempt to go against Breed, but Breed orders the other animals to attack them. At that point, Law, Caesar, and Luffy enter the room and Luffy knocks the animals out. Law explains how he saw through the Peto-Peto's weakness, which requires the victim to hear Breed's voice to obey him. Breed uses his Devil Fruit on himself and manages to enhance his strength and muscles and tries to attack Luffy and the others. However, his control over the other animals' fades, which allows them to work together and hold Breed still. Luffy and Dugong throw a combined punch to Breed and manage to defeat him. After thanking everyone for their help the Sea Monster Pirates set off for new adventures. Later on, on the Sunny, the news about Doflamingo's resignation arrives along with the news of Law's and Luffy's alliance. The news also announces the alliance between the Kid Pirates, On Air Pirates, and Hawkins Pirates. The day's news causes chaos in the New World.

== Home media release ==
=== Japanese ===
Avex Pictures (Japan – Region 2/A)
Volume		Episodes	Release date	Ref.
16th Season Punk Hazard-hen	piece.1	579–582	January 8, 2014	
16th Season Punk Hazard-hen	piece.2	583–586	January 8, 2014	
16th Season Punk Hazard-hen	piece.3	587–589, 591	February 5, 2014	
16th Season Punk Hazard-hen	piece.4	592–595	February 5, 2014	
16th Season Punk Hazard-hen	piece.5	596–599	March 5, 2014	
16th Season Punk Hazard-hen	piece.6	600–603	March 5, 2014	
16th Season Punk Hazard-hen	piece.7	604–607	April 2, 2014	
16th Season Punk Hazard-hen	piece.8	608–611	April 2, 2014	
16th Season Punk Hazard-hen	piece.9	612–615	May 14, 2014	
16th Season Punk Hazard-hen	piece.10	616–619	May 14, 2014	
16th Season Punk Hazard-hen	piece.11	620–623	June 4, 2014	
16th Season Punk Hazard-hen	piece.12	624–628	June 4, 2014	
One Piece Log Collection	"Punk Hazard"	574, 579–589, 591–594	July 22, 2016	
One Piece Log Collection	"Laboratory"	595–611	August 26, 2016	
One Piece Log Collection	"Caesar Clown"	612–628	September 23, 2016	

=== English ===
In North America, the season was recategorized as the majority of "Season Ten" for its DVD release by Funimation Entertainment. The Australian Season Ten sets were renamed Collection 48 through 51.

Funimation Entertainment (North America – Region 1/A); Madman Entertainment (Australia and New Zealand – Region 4/B)
Volume		Episodes	Release date			ISBN	Ref.
Volume		Episodes	NA	UK & IE	AUS & NZ	ISBN	Ref.
Season Ten							
Season Ten	Voyage One	575–587	June 9, 2020	N/A	October 5, 2022	ISBN N/A	
Season Ten	Voyage Two	588–589, 591–600	September 8, 2020	N/A	October 5, 2022	ISBN N/A	
Season Ten	Voyage Three	601–614	November 10, 2020	N/A	November 9, 2022	ISBN N/A	
Season Ten	Voyage Four	615–628	January 5, 2021	N/A	November 9, 2022	ISBN N/A	
Collection	24	564–587	February 2, 2021	November 29, 2021	N/A	ISBN N/A	
Collection	25	588–589, 591–614	May 11, 2021	April 4, 2022	N/A	ISBN N/A	
Collection	26	615–641	June 15, 2021	May 16, 2022	N/A	ISBN N/A	
