= Seikimatsu Leader den Takeshi! =

Japanese manga series

- First tankōbon volume cover, featuring Takeshi

世紀末リーダー伝たけし! (Seikimatsu Rīdā den Takeshi!)
- Genre: Comedy
- Manga
- Written by: Mitsutoshi Shimabukuro
- Published by: Shueisha
- Imprint: Jump Comics
- Magazine: Weekly Shōnen Jump
- Original run: July 15, 1997 – August 13, 2002
- Volumes: 24
- icon

Seikimatsu Leader den Takeshi! (Japanese: 世紀末リーダー伝たけし!, Hepburn: Seikimatsu Rīdā den Takeshi!; 'The Tale of Takeshi, the End-of-the-Century Leader!') is a Japanese manga series written and illustrated by Mitsutoshi Shimabukuro. It started in Shueisha's shōnen manga magazine Weekly Shōnen Jump in July 1997. It was suspended from the magazine in August 2002, following Shimabukuro's arrest for violating child prostitution laws. Its chapters were collected in 24 tankōbon volumes. The series briefly resumed in Shueisha's seinen manga magazine Super Jump in 2005, with the added subtitle Kanketsu-hen.

In 2001, the series won the 46th Shogakukan Manga Award in the children's manga category.

== Plot ==
From birth, Takeshi, a seven-year-old boy with a distinctly middle-aged appearance, was perceived as a natural leader. His first word was "leader", and his father, Hiroshi, was a quintessential leader among salarymen. Following Hiroshi's sudden death, Takeshi dedicates himself to emulating his father. He joins his first-grade class with the singular goal of becoming a true leader to his peers.

== Media ==
=== Manga ===
Written and illustrated by Mitsutoshi Shimabukuro, Seikimatsu Leader den Takeshi! started in Shueisha's shōnen manga magazine Weekly Shōnen Jump on July 15, 1997. (Note: The series started in the magazine's 33rd issue of 1997 (cover date), released on July 15 of that same year.) Following Shimabukuro's arrest for violating child prostitution laws on August 7, 2002, the series was suspended from the magazine, finishing with its 237th chapter, released on August 13 of that same year. (Note: It finished in the magazine's combined 36th–37th issue of 2002 (cover date August 26), released on August 13 of that same year.) Shueisha collected its chapters into individual tankōbon volumes; the first volume was released on December 29, 1997, and, prior to the suspension, the 24th and last volume was released on July 9, 2002.

The series briefly resumed in Shueisha's seinen manga magazine Super Jump in 2005, with the added subtitle Kanketsu-hen (完結編; "The Final Chapter"), and Shueisha re-released the series in 13 bunkoban volumes from August 4, 2004, to December 2, 2005.

=== Film ===
A pilot film was shown as part of the "Jump Super Anime Tour" of 1998 alongside pilots for One Piece and Hunter × Hunter.

== Reception ==
In 2001, the series won the 46th Shogakukan Manga Award in the children's manga category.
