= Build King =

Japanese manga series

- Cover of the first volume
- Genre: Fantasy
- Manga
- Written by: Mitsutoshi Shimabukuro
- Published by: Shueisha
- English publisher: NA: Viz Media
- Imprint: Jump Comics
- Magazine: Weekly Shōnen Jump
- Original run: November 16, 2020 – April 12, 2021
- Volumes: 3
- icon

Build King (stylized as BUILD KING) is a Japanese manga series written and illustrated by Mitsutoshi Shimabukuro. It originated as a one-shot that was published in Shueisha's Weekly Shōnen Jump in April 2018, before becoming a full series that was serialized in the same magazine from November 2020 to April 2021. It was compiled into three tankōbon volumes.

== Publication ==
The series is written and illustrated by Mitsutoshi Shimabukuro. It originated as a one-shot that was published in Weekly Shōnen Jump on April 23, 2018. On November 8, 2020, it was announced the one-shot will become a full series. The full series was published in Weekly Shōnen Jump from November 16, 2020, to April 12, 2021. Three tankōbon volumes were released from April 2 to September 3, 2021. The third and final volume included extra content that did not appear during its serialization.

Viz Media published the original one-shot in their digital magazine Weekly Shonen Jump. Viz Media, along with Manga Plus, also published chapters of the full series simultaneously with the Japanese release.

=== Volumes ===
No.	Original release date	Original ISBN	English release date	English ISBN
1	April 2, 2021	978-4-08-882648-6	July 26, 2022 (digital)	978-1-9747-2587-8
01. "Tonkachi and Renga"; 02. "Nana and the House-Beast"; 03. "Monster Hurricane"; 04. "Arrival to the Continent"; 05. "First Request"; 06. "The Renovation of Upside-Down Castle"; 07. "The Secret of Upside-Down Castle"
2	June 4, 2021	978-4-08-882683-7	July 26, 2022 (digital)	978-1-9747-3347-7
08. "Look At It Upside-Down; 09. "Exam for the Buildon License"; 10. "The Prelims"; 11. "Vigor Methods of Construction"; 12. "The First Test!!"; 13. "The Lead Master Carpenter"; 14. "How to Convey Vigor"; 15. "The Crystallization of Vigor"; 16. "The Secret of Vigor!!"; 17. "Satan Hills vs. ..."
3	September 3, 2021	978-4-08-882761-2	July 26, 2022 (digital)	978-1-9747-3348-4
18. "A Symbol"; 19. "The Sought-After Vigor"; 20. "Two-By-Four"; 21. "Welcome Home"; 22. "The Timbre of Family"; 23. "The Truth Behind the Beginning"; 24. "Bill Carpenter"; 25. "Love Vigor"
