= Mitsutoshi Shimabukuro =

Japanese manga artist

Mitsutoshi Shimabukuro 島袋 光年
- Born: May 19, 1975 (age 51); Naha, Okinawa, Japan
- Occupation: Manga artist
- Years active: 1996–present
- Known for: Seikimatsu Leader den Takeshi!, Toriko
- Awards: Akatsuka Award, Shogakukan Manga Award (2001)

Mitsutoshi Shimabukuro (島袋 光年, Shimabukuro Mitsutoshi; born May 19, 1975) is a Japanese manga artist. He first gained success with his comedy series Seikimatsu Leader den Takeshi! (1997–2002), but is better known for Toriko which was serialized from 2008 to 2016 and has over 25 million copies in circulation. He ranked 14th on Nikkei Entertainment's list of the most successful manga artists between 2010 and 2011.

== Career ==
=== 1996–2002: Early career ===
Shimabukuro was born in Naha, Okinawa, and made his debut as a professional artist in 1996, in Weekly Shōnen Jump. His first serial, Seikimatsu Leader den Takeshi! (1997–2002), earned him the Akatsuka Award for best new manga writer and the 2001 Shogakukan Manga Award for children's manga.

=== 2002–2003: Criminal conviction ===
In 2002, he was arrested and convicted of violating child prostitution laws, including paying a 16-year-old girl ¥80,000 to have sex. As a result of the arrest, Seikimatsu Leader Den Takeshi! was cancelled by Weekly Shōnen Jump. Shimabukuro was sentenced to two years in prison. However, the sentence was suspended for four years.

=== 2004–present: Return to manga ===
In 2004, Shimabukuro returned to manga with a sports comedy, Ring, which continued for 3 volumes (24 chapters) in Super Jump magazine. He then temporarily resumed serialization of Seikimatsu Leader den Takeshi! in Super Jump in 2005. Shimabukuro returned to work for Weekly Shōnen Jump in 2008 with Toriko. It became one of the magazine's top sellers, with over 25 million copies in circulation, and was nominated for the 2nd Manga Taishō award in 2009. Toriko was adapted into an anime television series by Toei Animation that aired from 2011 to 2014 before the manga ended in November 2016. The manga was released in North America by Viz Media and the anime by Funimation.

Shimabukuro is friends with Eiichiro Oda, author of One Piece. In 2011, the two created the Toriko and One Piece crossover one-shot Taste of the Devil Fruit. Shimabukuro stated that he came up with the bulk of the story while Oda gave suggestions.

Shimabukuro published two one-shots in April 2017; Warai no Ōji Penpenpen for Saikyō Jump on April 1 and Chingiri in Weekly Shōnen Jump on April 24. He then contributed two more one-shots to the September 2017 issue of Grand Jump; Jijī 100% and Halftime.

In April 2018, Shimabukuro released a one-shot called Build King in Weekly Shonen Jump. In November 2020, the one-shot became a serial in the same magazine. In December, Shimabukuro revealed that he has switched to digital production of manga. Build King ended in an April 2021 issue, but its third and final tankōbon will feature additional content.

== Works ==
- Seikimatsu Leader den Takeshi! (世紀末リーダー伝たけし!; 1997–2002, 2005; Weekly Shōnen Jump and Super Jump)
- Ring (2004–2005; Super Jump)
- Toriko (トリコ; 2008–2016; Weekly Shōnen Jump)
  - Toriko Gaiden (2009)
  - Taste of the Devil Fruit (実食! 悪魔の実!!, Jisshoku! Akuma no Mi!!; 2011; Weekly Shōnen Jump) – with Eiichiro Oda
- Warai no Ōji Penpenpen (笑いの王子ぺんぺんぺん; "Prince of Comedy Penpenpen", 2017; Saikyō Jump)
- Chingiri (ちんぎり; 2017; Weekly Shōnen Jump)
- Jijī 100% (ジジイ100%; 2017; Grand Jump)
- Halftime (ハーフタイム; 2017; Grand Jump)
- Build King (2020–2021, Weekly Shōnen Jump)
