= Toriko =

Japanese manga series

- First tankōbon volume cover, featuring the titular character, Toriko

トリコ
- Genre: Adventure; Fantasy comedy; Gourmet
- Manga
- Written by: Mitsutoshi Shimabukuro
- Published by: Shueisha
- English publisher: AUS: Madman Entertainment; NA: Viz Media
- Imprint: Jump Comics
- Magazine: Weekly Shōnen Jump
- English magazine: NA: Weekly Shonen Jump
- Original run: May 19, 2008 – November 21, 2016
- Volumes: 43
- Anime film
- Directed by: Mitsuru Obunai
- Written by: Masaki Hiramatsu
- Music by: Tomoki Hasegawa
- Studio: Ufotable
- Released: October 12, 2009
- Runtime: 28 minutes
- Anime film

Toriko: Capture the Barbarian Ivy!
- Released: October 23, 2010
- Runtime: 40 minutes
- Anime film

Toriko 3D: Kaimaku! Gourmet Adventure!!
- Directed by: Junji Shimizu
- Written by: Isao Murayama
- Music by: Hiromi Mizutani
- Studio: Toei Animation
- Released: March 19, 2011
- Runtime: 40 minutes
- Anime television series
- Directed by: Akifumi Zako; Hidehito Ueda (100–147)
- Produced by: Makoto Seino; Naoko Sato; Takashi Washio
- Written by: Isao Murayama
- Music by: Hiromi Mizutani
- Studio: Toei Animation
- Licensed by: Crunchyroll
- Original network: Fuji TV
- Original run: April 3, 2011 – March 30, 2014
- Episodes: 147
- Anime film

Toriko the Movie: Secret Recipe of Gourmet God
- Directed by: Akifumi Zako
- Written by: Isao Murayama
- Studio: Toei Animation
- Licensed by: NA: Discotek Media
- Released: July 27, 2013
- Runtime: 81 minutes
- icon

Toriko (トリコ) is a Japanese manga series written and illustrated by Mitsutoshi Shimabukuro. It was serialized in Shueisha's shōnen manga magazine Weekly Shōnen Jump from May 2008 to November 2016, with its chapters collected into 43 tankōbon volumes. The series follows the adventures of Toriko, a Gourmet Hunter, as he searches for rare, diverse foods to complete a full-course meal. On his journey, he is accompanied by a timid chef who wants to improve his skills.

A short film was created by Ufotable for the Jump Super Anime Tour 2009, with another created for the 2010 tour. The manga has also been adapted into an anime television series produced by Toei Animation, which was broadcast in Japan from April 2011 to March 2014. Additionally, Toei developed a 2011 animated 3D short film and a 2013 feature film.

The manga series has been licensed for English release by Viz Media in North America and Madman Entertainment in Australasia. Madman also licensed the anime series in Australasia, while Funimation licensed it in North America. Discotek Media licensed the 2013 film in North America.

By August 2023, the Toriko manga had over 30 million copies in circulation.

== Synopsis ==
=== Setting ===
The alternate depiction of Earth in Toriko is separated into two parts; the Human World (人間界, Ningen-kai) and the Gourmet World (グルメ界, Gurume-kai). The Human World is where modern civilization exists and occupies just 30% of the planet, the rest is the Gourmet World, which is inhospitable to most humans due to the strength of the wildlife and extreme climate changes. In the Gourmet Age (グルメ時代, Gurume Jidai), which began five centuries ago at the end of the hundred-year war, the taste and texture of food is extremely important. The International Gourmet Organization (国際グルメ機構, Kokusai Gurume Kikō) (IGO), maintains order and defends civilians from dangerous animals and gourmet criminals. Originally set up by the United Nations, the IGO is now independent from them and holds more influence as it is composed of 360 nations. They apply a numerical rating from 1 to 100, referred to as Capture Levels (捕獲レベル, Hokaku Reberu), to most ingredients based on the difficulty of acquiring it. The IGO has a group of seven individuals with highly sensitive taste, called the Gourmet 7 (グルメセブン, Gurume Sebun) or G7, that are in charge of assigning the star ranking of restaurants and the ranking of chefs.

Individuals known as Gourmet Hunters (美食屋, Bishokuya; lit. "Gourmet Food Providers"), who have usually trained their abilities to that of superhuman, are regularly hired by restaurants and the rich to seek high-level ingredients and rare animals. One can also increase their strength by implanting Gourmet Cells (グルメ細胞, Gurume Saibō) into their bodies. Gourmet Revivers (再生屋, Saiseiya; lit. "Regeneration Providers") are those who dedicate themselves to protecting ingredients from extinction or exhaustion, and who can also arrest people that partake in the transaction of illegal goods, violate poaching laws, or causes extinction of an entire species.

=== Plot ===
Toriko is a Gourmet Hunter searching for the most precious foods in the world so he can create his full-course meal. A man with inhuman ability, he utilizes his incredible strength and knowledge of the animal kingdom to capture ferocious, evasive, and rare beasts to further his menu. He is accompanied by the weak and timid chef Komatsu, who, inspired by Toriko's ambition, travels with him to improve his culinary skills and to find rare ingredients. Toriko and his friends often fight against the Gourmet Corps (美食會, Bishoku-kai), who seek to take control of the world's entire food supply and are looking for the highly sought-after ingredient GOD (GOD（ゴッド）, Goddo), which the legendary Gourmet Hunter Acacia used to end the war that took place five-hundred years before the series began.

== Media ==
=== Manga ===
Written and illustrated by Mitsutoshi Shimabukuro, Toriko was serialized in the manga anthology Weekly Shōnen Jump from May 19, 2008, to November 21, 2016. The 396 individual chapters were collected and published into 43 tankōbon volumes by Shueisha between November 4, 2008, and December 31, 2016. Readers and fans of the series were able to submit ideas and designs for monsters and ingredients that appear in the manga.

At San Diego Comic-Con in 2009, Viz Media announced they had licensed Toriko for English release. They released the 43 volumes from June 1, 2010, to August 7, 2018. The manga premiered in the February 2010 edition of a digital supplement available only to subscribers of Viz's printed Shonen Jump magazine. When the printed magazine ended, Toriko was one of the launch titles of its digital successor Weekly Shonen Jump (originally named Weekly Shonen Jump Alpha), starting with chapter 171 in its debut issue on January 30, 2012. The Toriko and One Piece crossover was sent out free to annual subscribers of the magazine who signed up before April 30, 2012. Madman Entertainment released the first volume in Australasia on July 10, 2010, and have released twenty-six volumes as of April 10, 2015.

Shimabukuro collaborated with Eiichiro Oda, author of One Piece, for a crossover one-shot of their series titled Taste of the Devil Fruit!! (実食! 悪魔の実!!, Jisshoku! Akuma no Mi!!; lit. "The True Food! Devil Fruit!!"), which ran in the April 4, 2011 issue of Weekly Shōnen Jump. There is also a spin-off manga series titled Gourmet Academy Toriko (グルメ学園トリコ), written by Toshinori Takayama and illustrated by Akitsugu Mizumoto. It was serialized in Saikyō Jump from December 3, 2010, to December 2, 2016, with the chapters collected into 9 tankōbon between April 4, 2012, and December 31, 2016.

=== Films ===
Film	Japan release date	Directed by	Written by	Animation directed by
Toriko	October 12, 2009	Directed by : Mitsuru Obunai; Storyboarded by : Hiroyuki Shimazu	Masaki Hiramatsu	Masayuki Kunihiro
Toriko: Capture the Barbarian Ivy!	October 23, 2010	Directed by : Toshiaki Komura; Storyboarded by : Daisuke Nishio, Toshiaki Komura & Takashi Otsuka	Isao Murayama	Hisashi Kagawa
Toriko 3D: Kaimaku! Gourmet Adventure!	March 19, 2011	Junji Shimizu	Isao Murayama	Tadayoshi Yamamuro

A short film simply titled Toriko, directed by Mitsuru Obunai and produced by Ufotable, was shown on October 12, 2009, at the Jump Super Anime Tour 2009. It was streamed on Weekly Shōnen Jump's English website one month later. A second short, titled Toriko: Capture the Barbarian Ivy! (トリコ バーバリアンアイビーを捕獲せよ!), was shown at the following year's Jump Super Anime Tour on October 23, 2010.

An animated 3D film short, Toriko 3D: Kaimaku! Gourmet Adventure!! (トリコ3D 開幕!グルメアドベンチャー!!, Toriko Surīdī: Kaimaku! Gurume Adobenchā!!), produced by Toei Animation, was released in Japanese theaters on March 19, 2011, as a double feature with the One Piece film One Piece 3D: Mugiwara Chase.

A feature-length film, Toriko the Movie: Secret Recipe of Gourmet God (劇場版トリコ 美食神の超食宝, Gekijō-ban Toriko Bishoku-shin no Chō Shoku Takara), was released in theaters on July 27, 2013. It was licensed in North America by Discotek Media, which released the film on DVD and Blu-ray in 2018.

=== Anime ===
In December 2010, it was announced that Toei Animation would be adapting Toriko into an anime television series in 2011. It is directed by Akifumi Zako and began broadcasting in Japan on Fuji Television on April 3, 2011. It took over Dragon Ball Kai's 9:00 am slot on Sunday in the "Dream 9" time-slot, airing before One Piece. A cross-over special between Toriko and One Piece, considered episode 1 of Toriko and episode 492 of One Piece, aired as the series' premiere, with another between the two series airing on April 10, 2012, episode 51 of Toriko and episode 542 of One Piece. A two-part hour-long crossover special between Toriko, One Piece and Dragon Ball Z aired on Fuji TV on April 7, 2013. Referred to as Dream 9 Toriko & One Piece & Dragon Ball Z Super Collaboration Special!!, the parts are considered episode 590 of One Piece and episode 99 of Toriko respectively. The Toriko anime ended with episode 147 on March 30, 2014, being replaced by the return of Dragon Ball Kai.

In 2011, Funimation announced that it licensed Toriko for streaming in North America within four days after the Japanese broadcast. It premiered on Hulu and Funimation's official website on April 14. Eventually, the series was rescheduled to stream within three days after the Japanese broadcast. Funimation began releasing the series on DVD with an English dub from January 8, 2013, which abruptly stopped on May 7, 2013, for unknown reasons. Madman Entertainment announced they licensed the anime for Australasia on February 3, 2013.

=== Other media ===
A book titled Toriko Gaiden (トリコ外伝) was published on October 2, 2009, consisting of an interview with Mitsutoshi Shimabukuro, the 2007 Toriko one-shot, and other unrelated one-shots by the author. The guidebook Toriko Gourmet Hunting Book (トリコ グルメハンティングブック) was released on November 4, 2011, and includes the original one-shot for Toriko from 2002 and the One Piece crossover chapter. A third companion book, listed as simply the 29.5 volume of Toriko, was released on June 4, 2014.

The television show Sakiyomi Jum-Bang! created a Vomic, a portmanteau of voice and comic, of the first couple chapters of Toriko in 2009. The segment has voice actors act over a manga series as the pages are shown on screen, Toriko was played by Takashi Kondō and Komatsu by Daisuke Kishio.

There have been five video games created by Namco Bandai based on Toriko. Two for the PlayStation Portable, Toriko: Gourmet Survival! (2011) and Toriko: Gourmet Survival! 2 (2012), and three for the Nintendo 3DS, Toriko: Gourmet Monsters! (2012), Toriko: Gourmet Battle! (2013) and Toriko: Ultimate Survival (2013). Toriko and Zebra are also playable characters in the Weekly Shōnen Jump crossover PlayStation 3 and PlayStation Vita fighting game J-Stars Victory VS.

== Reception ==
In 2009, Toriko was nominated for the second annual Manga Taishō award. The first and second collected tankōbon volumes, both released on November 4, 2008, were ranked 10th and 11th respectively on Oricon's manga chart for their first week, with nearly 70,000 and 67,000 copies sold. It was the 10th best-selling manga series during the first half of 2011, with over 1.8 million copies sold. Toriko was the eleventh best-selling manga series of 2012, with over 3 million copies sold, and the thirteenth best of 2013, selling 2.8 million. In 2011, Namco Bandai Games estimated Toriko would bring US$25.6 million in toys for the 2012 fiscal year. The series had 18 million volumes in circulation by November 2013; over 20 million volumes in circulation by June 2014; over 25 million copies in circulation by November 2020; and over 30 million copies in circulation by August 2023.

Otaku USA's Joseph Luster called Toriko "an absolute feast for fans of beasts", not able to tell "whether Shimabukuro just comes up with everything on the spot or if it's all meticulously planned out", and said that the series' charm is "how it effortlessly applies classic shonen tropes to such an outlandish world." However, he commented that "The formula of Toriko is apparent right from the start in true shonen fashion ... tougher and tougher creatures will quickly follow." Deb Aoki writing for About.com also praised the imaginative beasts and monsters of the series, as well as the occasional informational bits on the true science of foods, but called the art "grotesquely goofy."

Lissa Pattillo of Anime News Network (ANN) called Toriko an "in-your-face action story riding on the back of a gastronomic fetch-quest." She compared Toriko's design to that of characters from Dragon Ball and Fist of the North Star, and suggested this might deter some readers. ANN's Rebecca Silverman stated that "Shimabukuro has clearly devoted time and thought to crafting the story's world, as complex creatures, animal profiles, and distinctive landscapes attest.", and called his art an "odd mix of old school JoJo's Bizarre Adventure-style manly men and newer One Piece-style chibis." Carlo Santos, also for ANN, praised the action, saying "For over-the-top action, it's hard to beat the thrill of Toriko punching out a swarm of giant insects, or the creep factor of a villain who literally wears another human's skin.", and called the art one of the series' highlights. Reviewing the anime, Santos said "Fans will know what to expect in each adventure: ravenous strongmen flexing their superpowers, ferocious foes being slaughtered by said strongmen, and a rich, imaginative world full of impossibly delicious foods. But the simplicity of Toriko is also its downfall: there are no clever twists in store, the characters don't develop at all, either personally or interpersonally, and even the most calculating villains are just mindless targets waiting to be knocked down one by one. The on-again, off-again animation also does a disservice to the bright colors and creative designs of the series."
