= List of One Piece episodes =

One Piece is an anime television series based on the manga series One Piece by Eiichiro Oda. As of September 27, 2026, the anime series has aired 1180 episodes.

== Series overview ==
Season	Main arc title(s)	Episodes	Originally released	
Season	Main arc title(s)	Episodes	First released	Last released
1	East Blue	61	October 20, 1999	March 7, 2001
2	Entering into the Grand Line	16	March 21, 2001	August 19, 2001
3	Introducing Chopper at Drum Kingdom	15	August 26, 2001	December 9, 2001
4	Alabasta	38	December 16, 2001	October 27, 2002
5	TV Original	13	November 3, 2002	February 2, 2003
6	Skypiea	52	February 9, 2003	June 13, 2004
7	Escape! The Naval Fortress & The Foxy Pirate Crew	33	June 20, 2004	March 27, 2005
8	Water Seven	35	April 17, 2005	April 30, 2006
9	Enies Lobby	73	May 21, 2006	December 23, 2007
10	Thriller Bark	45	January 6, 2008	December 14, 2008
11	Sabaody Archipelago	26	December 21, 2008	June 28, 2009
12	Amazon Lily	14	July 5, 2009	October 11, 2009
13	Impel Down	35	October 18, 2009	June 20, 2010
14	Marineford	60	June 27, 2010	September 25, 2011
15	Fish-Man Island	62	October 2, 2011	December 23, 2012
16	Punk Hazard	50	January 6, 2013	January 12, 2014
17	Dressrosa	118	January 19, 2014	June 19, 2016
18	Zou	36	June 26, 2016	April 2, 2017
19	Whole Cake Island	109	April 9, 2017	June 30, 2019
20	Wano Country	197	July 7, 2019	December 17, 2023
21	Egghead	67	January 7, 2024	December 28, 2025
22	Elbaph	25	April 5, 2026	TBA

== Episodes ==
=== Seasons 1–8 ===
- List of One Piece episodes (seasons 1–8)
  - Season 1
  - Season 2
  - Season 3
  - Season 4
  - Season 5
  - Season 6
  - Season 7
  - Season 8

=== Seasons 9–14 ===
- List of One Piece episodes (seasons 9–14)
  - Season 9
  - Season 10
  - Season 11
  - Season 12
  - Season 13
  - Season 14

=== Seasons 15–19 ===
- List of One Piece episodes (seasons 15–19)
  - Season 15
  - Season 16
  - Season 17
  - Season 18
  - Season 19

=== Seasons 20–present ===
- List of One Piece episodes (seasons 20–present)
  - Season 20
  - Season 21
  - Season 22

== See also ==
- List of anime series by episode count
