= The Long Arm of the Claw =

"The Long Arm of the Claw" is the name of several television episodes:

- "Long Arm of the Claw", an episode of One Piece
  - "Long Arm of the Claw", an episode of Quack Pack
