= One Piece season 6 =

One Piece
- Season 6 Sky Island
- The Eternal Log home media cover art for Skypiea, which released on July 22, 2022
- No. of episodes: 52

Release
- Original network: Fuji Television
- Original release: February 9, 2003 – June 13, 2004

Season chronology
- ← Previous; Season 5 Next → Season 7

The sixth season of the One Piece anime television series ran from February 9, 2003, through June 13, 2004, on Fuji Television. Directed by Konosuke Uda and produced by Toei Animation, it is based on the 24th to 32nd volumes of Eiichiro Oda's manga of the same name. It was licensed by Funimation as the first season dubbed in English after 4Kids Entertainment was dropped for their heavily edited dubbing. The sixth season deals primarily with the Straw Hat Pirates's exploration of the legendary Skypiea, a land of winged humanoids built upon clouds, where they face off against Eneru and his henchmen.

The English version ran from September 29, 2007, through March 15, 2008, on Cartoon Network, airing just the first 24 in the US. Australia, however, continued to air new episodes and concluded the season on November 3, 2008, to January 9, 2009. English broadcasts of the season used the name translations established by 4Kids for the first 31 episodes; episodes 32 onward, and Home Media releases of the entire season, use Funimation's uncut naming scheme instead.

The season uses six pieces of theme music: two opening themes and four ending themes. The opening theme "Hikari e" (ヒカリヘ; lit. Toward the Light) by The Babystars in Japanese and Vic Mignogna in English is used until episode 168, followed by "Bon Voyage" by Bon-Bon Blanco for the rest of the season. The ending theme "Free Will" by Ruppina in Japanese and Kristine Sa in English is used until episode 156, followed by Ruppina's "Faith" until episode 168 in Japanese, with Caitlin Glass performing the English version, "A to Z" by ZZ in Japanese and Vic Mignogna in English until episode 181 and "Tsuki to Taiyō" (月と太陽; lit. The Moon and The Sun) by shela in Japanese and Stephanie Young in English for the rest of the season. Funimation's dub uses English versions of these songs.

== Episodes ==
No. overall	No. in season	Title	Directed by	Written by	Original release date	English air date (Note: Episodes 168 through 195 did not air on television in the United States, but did air in Australia. These episodes were, however, released on DVD. For further information on DVD releases, please refer to the "Home Releases" section of this page.)
Jaya
144	1	"Caught Log! The King of Salvagers, Masira!"; Transliteration: "Ubawareta kiroku! Sarubēji ō Mashira!" (Japanese: 奪われた記録!サルベージ王マシラ!)	Hidehiko Kadota	Yoshiyuki Suga	February 9, 2003	September 29, 2007
Nami's log pose begins to point to the sky, after that, a big ship falls from sky and the crew finds a map in of an island named 'Skypiea' on a 200-year-old ship. They compete with the monkey-like Masira's salvage crew while they search for more clues on how to get there. The episode ends with Masira, Luffy, Zoro, and Sanji being eaten by a giant turtle.
145	2	"Monsters Appear! Don't Mess with the Whitebeard Pirates!"; Transliteration: "Kaibutsu tōjō! Shirohige Ichimi ni wa te o dasu na" (Japanese: 怪物登場!白ひげ一味には手を出すな)	Hiroyuki Kakudō	Yoshiyuki Suga	February 16, 2003	October 6, 2007
The Straw Hats decide to go to Jaya island to look for information on Skypiea. Meanwhile, Ace suddenly shows up on Buggy's ship; Buggy doesn't let any of his men attack Ace, fearing Whitebeard's retribution.
146	3	"Quit Dreaming! Mock Town, the Town of Ridicule!"; Transliteration: "Yume o miru na! Azakeri no machi Mokku Taun!" (Japanese: 夢を見るな!嘲りの街モックタウン!)	Yoko Ikeda	Yoshiyuki Suga	February 23, 2003 (Note: Aired as part of a special with episodes of other anime shows.)	October 13, 2007
Jaya's main town is full of famous pirates that are constantly brawling with each other. Luffy and Zoro have a run-in with a pirate known as 'Bellamy the Hyena,' who ridicules their dreams and beats them up.
147	4	"Distinguished Pirates! A Man Who Talks of Dreams and the King of Undersea Search!"; Transliteration: "Kaizoku no takami! Yume o kataru otoko to kaitei shinsaku ō" (Japanese: 海賊の高み!夢を語る男と海底探索王)	Directed by : Junichi Fujise; Storyboarded by : Munehisa Sakai	Yoshiyuki Suga	March 9, 2003	October 20, 2007
Luffy, Zoro, and Nami meet the man who is later revealed to be Blackbeard. They leave Mock Town, and get into a fight with Masira's brother Shōjo, another salvage monkey.
148	5	"Legendary Family! Noland, the Liar!"; Transliteration: "Densetsu no ichizoku! Usotsuki Nōrando" (Japanese: 伝説の一族!「うそつきノーランド」)	Junji Shimizu	Yoshiyuki Suga	March 16, 2003	October 27, 2007
The Straw Hats meet with Montblanc Cricket on another part of Jaya; Cricket is a descendant of Montblanc Noland, an infamous "liar" who told of a gold city on Jaya, and Cricket was outcast for looking for artifacts of the gold city. He may be the only person who knows how to get to Skypiea.
149	6	"Steer for the Clouds! Capture the South Bird!"; Transliteration: "Kumo kaji ippai! Sausubādo o oe!" (Japanese: 雲舵いっぱい!サウスバードを追え!)	Yuji Endo	Yoshiyuki Suga	March 23, 2003	November 3, 2007
Cricket explains how the Straw Hats can ride a dangerous vertical current called the Knock-Up Stream to get to Skypiea. However, they first have to catch a South Bird to point them toward the point where the stream will erupt from the ocean.
150	7	"Dreams Don't Come True?! Bellamy Versus the Saruyama Alliance!"; Transliteration: "Yume wa kanawanai!? Beramī VS saruyama rengō" (Japanese: 幻想は叶わない!?ベラミーVS猿山連合)	Hidehiko Kadota	Yoshiyuki Suga	April 13, 2003	November 10, 2007
While the Straw Hats are looking for a South Bird, Bellamy and his crew attack Cricket's house, and steal the gold artifacts he'd collected over the years from his salvage work. When the Straw Hats return and see what happened, Luffy decides to take a side trip back to Mock Town.
151	8	"100 Million Man! World's Greatest Power and Pirate Black Beard!"; Transliteration: "Ichioku no otoko! Sekai saikō kenryoku to kaizoku kurohige" (Japanese: 一億の男!世界最高権力と海賊黒ひげ)	Ken Koyama	Yoshiyuki Suga	April 20, 2003	November 24, 2007
Luffy takes out Bellamy with a single punch. Meanwhile, the world government heads are concerned over Whitebeard, Shanks, and Luffy. The marines try to decide who will replace Crocodile as a Warlord – one of Blackbeard's crew shows up uninvited and nominates his captain.
152	9	"Take to the Sky! Ride the Knockup Stream!"; Transliteration: "Fune wa sora o yuku! Tsukiageru kairyū ni nore" (Japanese: 船は空をゆく!突き上げる海流に乗れ)	Hiroyuki Kakudō	Michiru Shimada	April 27, 2003	December 1, 2007
The Going Merry is refitted by Masira and Shōjo to be more flight capable, and the Straw Hats catch a ride on the Knock-Up Stream for Skypiea.
Skypiea
153	10	"Sail the White Sea! The Sky Knight and the Gate in the Clouds!"; Transliteration: "Koko wa sora no umi! Sora no kishi to tengoku no mon" (Japanese: ここは空の海!空の騎士と天国の門)	Junji Shimizu	Michiru Shimada	May 4, 2003	December 8, 2007
The Straw Hats arrive in an ocean above the clouds. Usopp almost falls out of the sky island but is saved at the last minute. The crew is also attacked by a mysterious looking warrior, but is saved by the Knight of the Sky. Finally, they arrive at the border which transports them to the upper realm, Skypiea.
154	11	"Godland, Skypiea! Angels on a Beach of Clouds!"; Transliteration: "Kami no kuni Sukaipia! Kumo no nagisa no tenshitachi" (Japanese: 神の国スカイピア!雲の渚の天使たち)	Yoko Ikeda	Ryōta Yamaguchi	May 11, 2003	December 15, 2007
As the crew arrives in Skypiea, they're greeted by Conis and her pet Suu. Both she and her father start explaining how the life in Skypiea is and how the different Dials work.
155	12	"The Forbidden Sacred Ground! The Island Where God Lives and Heaven's Judgement!"; Transliteration: "Kindan no seichi! Kami no sumi shima to ten no sabaki!" (Japanese: 禁断の聖地!神の住む島と天の裁き!)	Hidehiko Kadota	Michiru Shimada	May 18, 2003	December 22, 2007
Nami finds out what should happen to anyone who enters the forest. Meanwhile, the rest of the gang are waiting for the wind to change but are rudely assaulted by Skypiea's police who are going to carry out Heaven's Judgement.
156	13	"Already Criminals?! Skypiea's Upholder of the Law!"; Transliteration: "Hayaku mo hanzaisha!? Sukaipia no hō no banjin" (Japanese: 早くも犯罪者!?スカイピアの法の番人)	Junichi Fujise	Yoshiyuki Suga	June 8, 2003	December 29, 2007
The Straw Hats have some problems with the local justice enforcer force called "The White Berets" for not paying the entrance fee.
157	14	"Is Escape Possible?!? God's Challenge is Set in Motion"; Transliteration: "Dasshutsu naru ka!? Ugokihajimeta kami no shiren!" (Japanese: 脱出なるか!?動きはじめた神の試練!)	Ken Koyama	Junki Takegami	June 15, 2003	January 5, 2008
Before they can leave, Chopper, Robin, Nami and Zoro are abducted by a giant shrimp. Luffy, Sanji and Usopp go after them to the upper yard.
158	15	"A Trap on Lovely Street! The Almighty Eneru"; Transliteration: "Raburī dōri no wana! Zennō naru Goddo Eneru" (Japanese: ラブリー通りの罠!全能なる神エネル)	Hiroyuki Kakudō	Junki Takegami	June 22, 2003	January 12, 2008
Nami and Robin are captured by a giant shrimp, leading to a rescue mission by Luffy, Sanji, and Usopp. This moment highlights their teamwork and importance in the Sky Island Arc.
159	16	"Onward Crow! To the Sacrificial Altar!"; Transliteration: "Susume Karasumaru! Ikenie no saidan o mezase" (Japanese: すすめカラス丸!生贄の祭壇を目指せ)	Junji Shimizu	Yoshiyuki Suga	July 6, 2003	January 19, 2008
Luffy, Usopp and Sanji finally enter Upper Yard, only to find out that the whole road is trapped heavily, but at last they arrive at the Ordeal Gates. Meanwhile, Robin, Zoro, and Nami go out to explore Upper Yard while Chopper stays behind to guard the ship.
160	17	"10% Survival Rate! Satori, the Mantra Master!"; Transliteration: "Seizonritsu 10%! Mantora tsukai no shinkan Satori" (Japanese: 生存率10%!心綱使いの神官サトリ!)	Hidehiko Kadota	Yoshiyuki Suga	July 13, 2003	January 26, 2008
Luffy, Sanji, and Usopp enter the Ordeal of Balls gate and encounter the Priest Satori.
161	18	"The Ordeal of Spheres! Desperate Struggle in the Lost Forest!"; Transliteration: "'Tama no shiren' no kyōi! Mayoi no mori no shitō" (Japanese: 「玉の試練」の脅威!迷いの森の死闘)	Katsumi Tokoro	Junki Takegami	July 20, 2003	February 2, 2008
Usopp, Sanji, and Luffy fight Satori, but the power of Mantra seems to be too strong.
162	19	"Chopper in Danger! Former God vs. Priest Shura!"; Transliteration: "Choppā ayaushi! Moto kami VS Shinkan Shura" (Japanese: チョッパー危うし!元神VS神官シュラ)	Munehisa Sakai	Junki Takegami	August 3, 2003	February 9, 2008
Chopper, threatened by priest Shura, blows the whistle for Gan Fall to come, but before he can arrive, Priest Shura assaults Chopper and begins destroying the Going Merry.
163	20	"Profound Mystery! Ordeal of String and Ordeal of Love?!?"; Transliteration: "Makafushigi! Himo no shiren to koi no shiren!?" (Japanese: 摩訶不思議!紐の試練と恋の試練!?)	Ken Koyama	Yoshiyuki Suga	August 10, 2003	February 16, 2008
Satori is defeated by Luffy and Sanji. Meanwhile, Gan Fall has been defeated and Chopper jumps in the water to rescue him.
164	21	"Light the Fire of Shandora! Wyper the Warrior!"; Transliteration: "Shandora no tō o nobose! Senshi Waipā" (Japanese: シャンドラの灯を燈せ!戦士ワイパー)	Kōnosuke Uda	Yoshiyuki Suga	August 17, 2003	February 23, 2008
Chopper is saved by a bunch of giant South Birds, who tell him that Gan Fall was actually God. Nami, Zoro and Robin discover the reason why Upper Yard is a soil island: it was once part of Jaya, and this is the part that Liar Norland saw. Meanwhile, the Shandians attack Upper Yard.
165	22	"Jaya, City of Gold in the Sky! Head for God's Shrine!"; Transliteration: "Tenkū no ōgonkyō Jaya! Mezase kami no yashiro" (Japanese: 天空の黄金卿ジャヤ!目指せ神の社!)	Directed by : Junichi Fujise; Storyboarded by : Kenji Yokoyama	Junki Takegami	August 24, 2003	March 1, 2008
The Shandians' attack on Upper Yard has started. The crew is finally reunited, and everyone speaks up about what has happened. Chopper takes care of Gan Fall, and the pirates plan to steal the gold on the island.
166	23	"Festival on the Night Before Gold-Hunting! Feelings for "Vearth!""; Transliteration: "ōgon zenya matsuri! Vāsu e no omoi!" (Japanese: 黄金前夜祭!「ヴァース」への想い!)	Yoko Ikeda	Junki Takegami	September 7, 2003	March 8, 2008
After befriending a wolf pack, Gan Fall tells the crew a little more about the history of Upper Yard.
167	24	"Enter God Eneru! Farewell to the Survivors!"; Transliteration: "Goddo Eneru tōjō!! Ikinokori e no ōpādo" (Japanese: 神·エネル登場!!生き残りへの夜明曲)	Shigeyasu Yamauchi	Yoshiyuki Suga	September 21, 2003	March 15, 2008
Eneru takes away the limitations of the priests. Also, Usopp witnesses a mysterious person fixing the ship; the next day Merry is found to be back to her original form. After getting her off the altar, the pirates plan out their course of action. Note: This was the last episode to air on Toonami during its original run. The show returned to Toonami on May 18, 2013, continuing from episode 207.
168	25	"A Giant Snake Bares Its Fangs! The Survival Game Begins!"; Transliteration: "Kiba muku ōhebi! Tsui ni hajimaru sabaibaru gēmu" (Japanese: 牙むく大蛇!遂に始まる生き残り合戦)	Hiroyuki Kakudō	Yoshiyuki Suga	October 12, 2003	November 3, 2008
A giant python makes Luffy, Robin, Chopper and Zoro split while going to the ruins at the south.
169	26	"The Deadly Reject! War Demon Wyper's Resolve!"; Transliteration: "Sutemi no haigeki! Senki Waipā no kakugo" (Japanese: 捨身の排撃!!「戦鬼」ワイパーの覚悟)	Munehisa Sakai	Junki Takegami	October 19, 2003	November 4, 2008
Wyper takes out Shura and tells his goal to the Shandians, and Eneru speaks up about how many people will be alive by the end of his plan.
170	27	"Fierce Mid-Air Battle! Pirate Zoro vs. Warrior Braham!"; Transliteration: "Kūchū no gekisen! Kaizoku Zoro VS Senshi Burahamu" (Japanese: 空中の激戦!海賊ゾロVS戦士ブラハム)	Ken Koyama	Junki Takegami	October 19, 2003	November 5, 2008
Zoro fights the Shandian warrior Braham, and defeats him with One Sword Style: 36 Caliber Phoenix technique. ("36-Pound Cannon" In Japanese)
171	28	"The Roaring Burn Bazooka!! Pirate Luffy vs. War Demon Wyper!"; Transliteration: "Unaru nenshōhō!! Rufi vs senki Waipā" (Japanese: 唸る燃焼砲!!ルフィVS戦鬼ワイパー闘)	Katsumi Tokoro	Yoshiyuki Suga	October 26, 2003	November 6, 2008
Luffy fights Wyper, but after some time, he falls into some underground ruins. Meanwhile, Eneru appears on the Going Merry and after telling that his true goal was the City of Gold, he takes out both Usopp and Sanji; he then vanishes and leaves Satori's brothers, Hotori and Kotori, to avenge their brother.
172	29	"The Ordeal of Swamp! Chopper vs Sky Punk Gedatsu!"; Transliteration: "Numa no shiren! Choppā VS Shinkan Gedatsu!!" (Japanese: 沼の試練!チョッパーVS神官ゲダツ!!)	Hidehiko Kadota	Yoshiyuki Suga	November 2, 2003	November 7, 2008
Chopper is attacked by Gedatsu, who turns out to be a complete moron, and eventually defeats him, sending him plummeting to the Blue Sea. Conis and Pagaya help Aisa, and head to Upper Yard.
Sky Island ~ The Golden Bell
173	30	"Unbeatable Powers! Eneru's True Form is Revealed!"; Transliteration: "Muteki no nōryoku! Akasareru Eneru no shōtai" (Japanese: 無敵の能力!明かされるエネルの正体)	Kōnosuke Uda	Junki Takegami	November 9, 2003	November 10, 2008
Eneru defeats several members of the Shandian Tribe. Meanwhile, Gan Fall and Nami start and finish their fight with Kotori and Hotori. Hotori is defeated by Nami while Kotori is defeated by Gan Fall. It is also revealed that Eneru is made of lightning.
174	31	"A Mystical City! The Grand Ruins of Shandora!"; Transliteration: "Maboroshi no to! Yūdai naru Shandora no iseki!!" (Japanese: 幻の都!雄大なるシャンドラの遺跡!!)	Directed by : Yoko Ikeda; Storyboarded by : Kenji Yokoyama	Junki Takegami	November 16, 2003	November 11, 2008
While Robin is looking at some ruins she found, Yama, The Chief Enforcer, attacks her. Yama is easily defeated by Robin. Later, she discovers the legendary city, Shandora.
175	32	"0% Survival Rate! Chopper vs. Ohm, the Sword Wielding Priest!"; Transliteration: "Seisonritsu 0%!! Choppā VS shinkan Ōmu" (Japanese: 生存率0%!!チョッパーVS神官オーム)	Junichi Fujise	Junki Takegami	December 21, 2003	November 12, 2008
Priest Ohm appears and starts fighting everyone.
176	33	"Climb Giant Jack! Deadly Combat in the Upper Ruins!"; Transliteration: "Kyodai mame tsuru o nobore!! Jōsō iseki no shitō" (Japanese: 巨大豆蔓"を登れ!!上層遺跡の死闘)	Munehisa Sakai	Michiru Shimada	January 11, 2004	November 13, 2008
At the Upper Ruins, the fight between Ohm, Zoro, Gan Fall and Wyper begins. When Nami appears, she is swallowed by the giant python, along with Gan Fall and Aisa.
177	34	"The Ordeal of Iron! White Barbed Death Match!"; Transliteration: "Tetsu no shiren no shinkocchō! Shiroibara Desumacchi!!" (Japanese: 鉄の試練の真骨頂!白荊デスマッチ!!)	Ken Koyama	Michiru Shimada	January 18, 2004	November 14, 2008
Ohm makes matters worse, creating a barbed wire cage around the area. Raki is knocked out by Eneru, and Nami, Aisa, and Gan Fall find out why the python was rampaging so much.
178	35	"Bursting Slash! Zoro vs Ohm!"; Transliteration: "Hotobashiru Zangeki! Zoro VS shinkan Ōmu!!" (Japanese: ほとばしる斬撃!ゾロVS神官オーム!!)	Hidehiko Kadota	Michiru Shimada	January 25, 2004	November 17, 2008
Zoro finally defeats Priest Ohm with his 108 Caliber Phoenix technique. Meanwhile. Pagaya and Conis hear the terrible truth about the goal of Eneru: to eradicate every person in the sky.
179	36	"Collapsing Upper Ruins! The Quintet for the Finale!"; Transliteration: "Kuzure yuku jōsō iseki! Fināre e no kuintetto" (Japanese: 崩れゆく上層遺跡!終曲への五重奏!!)	Katsumi Tokoro	Michiru Shimada	February 1, 2004	November 18, 2008
Eneru appears only to reduce the group as close to his prediction as he can. To do that, Eneru destroys the Upper Ruins with one of his attacks, causing everyone to fall onto Shandorians ancestors city.
180	37	"Showdown in the Ancient Ruins! Sky God Eneru's Goal!"; Transliteration: "Kodai iseki no taiketsu! Goddo Eneru no mokuteki" (Japanese: 古代遺跡の対決!神·エネルの目的)	Yukio Kaizawa	Junki Takegami	February 8, 2004	November 19, 2008
Eneru counterattacks Gan Fall and lands a finishing hit. He then knocks out Robin as she tries to manipulate him. Zoro impresses Eneru with his power but is easily beaten, while trying to make him pay for what he did to Robin, but it takes Wyper with a secret weapon to take Eneru down.
181	38	"Ambition Towards the Endless Vearth! The Ark Maxim!"; Transliteration: "Kagirinai daichi e no yabō hakobune Makushimu" (Japanese: 限りない大地への野望方舟マクシム!!)	Yoko Ikeda	Junki Takegami	February 15, 2004	November 20, 2008
Eneru defeats Zoro and Wyper. Upon seeing this, Nami follows him to a cave where his ark, Maxim, is. Luffy finally gets out of the snake, along with Aisa, only to find out the outcome of the fight against Eneru. When Aisa tells him that she knows where he is, he asks her to take him there.
182	39	"They Finally Clash! Pirate Luffy vs God Eneru!"; Transliteration: "Tsui ni gekitotsu! Kaizoku Rufi VS Goddo Eneru!!" (Japanese: 遂に激突!海賊ルフィVS神·エネル!!)	Kōnosuke Uda	Junki Takegami	February 22, 2004	November 21, 2008
Luffy and Eneru start fighting. Conis tells the dangers of staying in Sky Island to the other Skypieans.
183	40	"Maxim Surfaces! Deathpiea is Activated!"; Transliteration: "Makushimu ujō! Ugokihajimeta Desupia!!" (Japanese: マクシム浮上!動き始めたデスピア!!)	Takahiro Imamura	Michiru Shimada	February 29, 2004	November 24, 2008
Eneru starts a machine that would bring the death of Sky Island: Deathpiea.
184	41	"Luffy Falls! Eneru's Judgement and Nami's Wish!"; Transliteration: "Rufi rakuka! Kami no sabaki to Nami no nozomi!!" (Japanese: ルフィ落下!神の裁きとナミの望み!!)	Ken Koyama	Michiru Shimada	March 7, 2004	November 25, 2008
Luffy falls from the ark. Nami starts fighting Eneru while Sanji and Usopp try to rescue her.
185	42	"The Two Awaken! On the Front Lines of the Burning Love Rescue!"; Transliteration: "Mesameta futari! Moeru koi no kyūshutsu zensen!!" (Japanese: 目覚めた二人!燃える恋の救出前線!!)	Munehisa Sakai	Michiru Shimada	March 14, 2004	November 26, 2008
Usopp and Sanji split up to rescue Nami, but the first one to get on deck is Usopp.
186	43	"Capriccio for Despair! The Impending Doom of Sky Island!"; Transliteration: "Zetsubō e no kyōsōkyoku hakari kuru sorajima no shōmetsu!!" (Japanese: 絶望への狂想曲迫り来る空島の消滅!!)	Hidehiko Kadota	Hirohiko Kamisaka	March 21, 2004	November 27, 2008
Eneru's thunderclouds are coming down to Sky Island while the evacuation is half complete.
187	44	"Led by a Bell's Sound! Tale of the Great Warrior and the Explorer!"; Transliteration: "Kane no oto no michibiki! Daisenshi to shinkenka no monogatari" (Japanese: 鐘の音の導き!大戦士と探検家の物語)	Hiroyuki Kakudō	Hirohiko Kamisaka	March 28, 2004	November 28, 2008
The history of Noland and Calgara is told, as a flashback from Wyper.
188	45	"Free From the Spell! The Great Warrior Sheds Tears!"; Transliteration: "Jubaku kara no kaihō! Daisenshi ga nagashita namida!!" (Japanese: 呪縛からの解放!大戦士が流した涙!!)	Takahiro Imamura	Hirohiko Kamisaka	March 28, 2004	December 30, 2008
Noland and Calgara are enjoying themselves, as well as the villagers and Noland's crew, but that changes one day, as the villagers start hating their new friends.
189	46	"Eternal Friends! The Vowed Bell Echoes Across the Mighty Seas!"; Transliteration: "Eien no shinyū! Daikaigen ni hibiku chikai no kane" (Japanese: 永遠の親友!大海原に響く誓いの鐘)	Katsumi Tokoro	Hirohiko Kamisaka	April 4, 2004	December 31, 2008
The cause of the hatred is discovered and explained. Meanwhile, Calgara vows to meet Noland again.
190	47	"Angel Island, Obliterated! The Horror of The Raigo's Advent!!"; Transliteration: "Enjerushima shōmetsu! Raigō kōrin no kyōfu!" (Japanese: エンジェル島消滅!雷迎降臨の恐怖!!)	Ken Koyama	Hirohiko Kamisaka	April 25, 2004	January 2, 2009
Angel Island is destroyed by Eneru's attacks. Luffy decides to go and ring the golden bell before Eneru takes it away.
191	48	"Knock Over Giant Jack! Last Hope for Escape!"; Transliteration: "Kyodai mame tsuru o taose! Dasshutsu e no saigō no nozomi" (Japanese: 巨大豆蔓を倒せ!脱出への最後の望み)	Yoko Ikeda	Hirohiko Kamisaka	May 2, 2004	January 5, 2009
Nami finds out a way to get to Eneru and sends a message to the others for them to cut down Giant Jack. Zoro cuts down half of the stalk, but Eneru fires a bolt straight at Zoro, rendering him unconscious. As the others look on hopelessly, Wyper lets his pride get the better of him, saying that the descendants of Calgara should ring the bell. Usopp tries to help in a knowingly futile attempt by using his Exploding Star techniques. Robin tells Wyper that Cricket, Noland's descendant, is searching for the Gold City and Luffy wants to ring the bell for him. Reinvigorated, Wyper goes to Giant Jack and uses one final Reject, knocking down the rest of the stalk in the process. Luffy and Nami then charge up Giant Jack to face Eneru.
192	49	"Miracle on Skypiea! The Love Song Heard in the Clouds!"; Transliteration: "Kami no kuni no kiseki! Tenshi ni todoita rabusongu" (Japanese: 神の国の奇跡!天使に届いた島の歌声)	Hidehiko Kadota	Hirohiko Kamisaka	May 9, 2004	January 6, 2009
Luffy finally defeats Eneru by smashing him into the Golden Bell, ringing it in the process.
193	50	"The Battle Ends! Proud Fantasia Echoes Far!"; Transliteration: "Tatakai no shūen! Tōku hibiku hokori takaki gensōkyoku" (Japanese: 戦いの終焉!遠く響く誇り高き幻想曲)	Hiroyuki Kakudō	Hirohiko Kamisaka	May 23, 2004	January 7, 2009
Luffy has won and the 400 year war on Sky Island is finally over. Montblanc Cricket and the Masira Brothers hear the Golden Bell ringing and realize that the Gold City was always in the sky. Eneru, who was thrown to the Blue Sea, heads out to the Fairy Vearth (the Moon). The Sky People (both Skypieans and Shandorians) celebrate the end of the war with a great bonfire.
Post-Skypiea
194	51	"I Made it Here! The Yarn the Poneglyphs Spin!"; Transliteration: "Ware koko ni itaru! Rekishi no honbun ga tsumugu mono" (Japanese: 我ここに至る!歴史の本文が紡ぐもの)	Junichi Fujise	Hirohiko Kamisaka	June 6, 2004	January 8, 2009
Robin deciphers the Poneglyphs on the Golden Bell and realizes how to find the Rio Poneglyph. She also discovers that the Poneglyphs on the Bell were written by Gol D. Roger, who could understand Poneglyphs, who had discovered the Rio Poneglyph, and had once visited Skypiea. Soon afterwards, the Straw Hats steal a bunch of gold from the Giant Anaconda's belly and they begin to leave Skypiea.
195	52	"Off to the Blue Sea!! A Heartfelt Finale!"; Transliteration: "Iza seikai e!! Omoi ga shibarinasu saishū gakushō" (Japanese: いざ青海へ!!想いが織りなす最終楽章)	Munehisa Sakai	Hirohiko Kamisaka	June 13, 2004	January 9, 2009
The Golden Bell rings as the Straw Hats are going down to the sea, meaning that they are welcome and are deeply thankful for what they did. When the ship finally rests on the sea, problems appear, as the ship has landed in a Marine base.

== Home media release ==
=== Japanese ===
Avex Pictures (Japan, Region 2 DVD)
Volume		Episodes	Release date	Ref.
6thシーズン 空島·スカイピア篇	piece.01	144–146	August 4, 2004	
6thシーズン 空島·スカイピア篇	piece.02	147–149	September 1, 2004	
6thシーズン 空島·スカイピア篇	piece.03	150–152	October 6, 2004	
6thシーズン 空島·スカイピア篇	piece.04	153–155	November 3, 2004	
6thシーズン 空島·スカイピア篇	piece.05	156–158	December 1, 2004	
6thシーズン 空島·スカイピア篇	piece.06	159–161	January 13, 2005	
6thシーズン 空島·スカイピア篇	piece.07	162–164	February 2, 2005	
6thシーズン 空島·スカイピア篇	piece.08	165–167	March 3, 2005	
6thシーズン 空島·スカイピア篇	piece.09	168–170	April 6, 2005	
6thシーズン 空島·スカイピア篇	piece.10	171–173	May 11, 2005	
6thシーズン 空島·黄金の鐘篇	piece.01	174–176	June 1, 2005	
6thシーズン 空島·黄金の鐘篇	piece.02	177–179	July 6, 2005	
6thシーズン 空島·黄金の鐘篇	piece.03	180–182	August 3, 2005	
6thシーズン 空島·黄金の鐘篇	piece.04	183–185	September 7, 2005	
6thシーズン 空島·黄金の鐘篇	piece.05	186–188	October 5, 2005	
6thシーズン 空島·黄金の鐘篇	piece.06	189–191	November 2, 2005	
6thシーズン 空島·黄金の鐘篇	piece.07	192–193	December 7, 2005	
6thシーズン 空島·黄金の鐘篇	piece.08	194–195	January 11, 2006	
ONE PIECE Log Collection	"SKYPIEA"	144–159	June 24, 2011	
ONE PIECE Log Collection	"GOD"	160–179	July 22, 2011	
ONE PIECE Log Collection	"BELL"	180–195	August 26, 2011	

=== English ===
In North America, this season was recategorized as the majority of "Season Three" for its DVD release by Funimation Entertainment. The Australian Season Three sets were renamed Collection 12 through 15.

Funimation Entertainment (USA, Region 1), Manga Entertainment (UK, Region 2), Madman Entertainment (Australia, Region 4)
Volume		Episodes	Release date			ISBN	Ref.
Season Three	First Voyage	144–156	July 6, 2010	N/A	August 17, 2011	ISBN 1-4210-2119-6	
Season Three	Second Voyage	157–169	August 31, 2010	N/A	September 14, 2011	ISBN 1-4210-2143-9	
Season Three	Third Voyage	170–182	October 26, 2010	N/A	October 19, 2011	ISBN 1-4210-2182-X	
Season Three	Fourth Voyage	183–195	January 25, 2011	N/A	November 16, 2011	ISBN 1-4210-2222-2	
Collections	Collection 6	131–156	June 12, 2012	May 19, 2014	N/A	ISBN 1-4210-2492-6	
Collections	Collection 7	157–182	August 14, 2012	August 11, 2014	N/A	ISBN 1-4210-2522-1	
Collections	Collection 8	183–205	September 25, 2012	November 3, 2014	N/A	ISBN 1-4210-2580-9	
Treasure Chest Collection	Two	104–205	N/A		October 31, 2013	ISBN N/A	
Voyage Collection	Three	104–156	N/A		October 4, 2017	ISBN N/A	
Voyage Collection	Four	157–205	N/A		November 8, 2017	ISBN N/A	
