= One Piece (1999 TV series) =

Japanese anime television series

- Genre: Adventure; Fantasy comedy; Science fiction
- Based on: One Piece by Eiichiro Oda
- Developed by: Junki Takegami (#1–195); Hirohiko Kamisaka (#196–798); Shōji Yonemura (#799–1155); Tomohiro Nakayama (#1156–)
- Directed by: List: Kōnosuke Uda (#1–130; 160–278); Junji Shimizu (#131–159); Munehisa Sakai (#244–372); Hiroaki Miyamoto (#352–679); Toshinori Fukazawa (#663–891); Tatsuya Nagamine (#892–1122); Kōhei Kureta (#892–1030); Aya Komaki (#892–961); Satoshi Itō (#962–1155); Yasunori Koyama (#1031–); Wataru Matsumi (#1123–)
- Voices of: Mayumi Tanaka; Akemi Okamura; Kazuya Nakai; Kappei Yamaguchi; Hiroaki Hirata; Ikue Ōtani; Yuriko Yamaguchi; Chō; Katsuhisa Hōki; Subaru Kimura
- Music by: Kohei Tanaka; Shirō Hamaguchi
- Country of origin: Japan
- Original language: Japanese
- No. of seasons: 22 (Note: According to the Japanese home media release of the series by Avex Pictures. In North America, Crunchyroll, LLC (formerly Funimation) currently recategorizes the series into 16 seasons for its home media release. Many international distributors may not recognize either season packages and only refer to respective arc titles.)
- No. of episodes: 1,180 (list of episodes)

Production
- Producers: Satoshi Teramoto (#1046–1088); Shintarō Hashimoto (#1089–1122); Miki Kobayashi (#1089–)
- Cinematography: Kōgo Oonishi (#730–891); Hideki Chiba (#892–917); Tomoya Hosaka (#918–1138); Takeshi Ishizu (#1123–)
- Animator: Toei Animation
- Editors: Shinichi Fukumitsu (#1–203); Masahiro Gotō (#204–345); Nobutaka Maki (#346–1088); Kiminori Yoshida (#1089–)
- Running time: 24 minutes (#1–65); 23 minutes (#66–)
- Production companies: Fuji Television; Toei Animation

Original release
- Network: Fuji Television
- Release: October 20, 1999 – present

One Piece (stylized in all caps) is a Japanese anime television series produced by Toei Animation, premiering on Fuji Television and its FNS affiliates in October 1999. It is based on the 1997 manga series One Piece by Eiichiro Oda. The story follows the adventures of Monkey D. Luffy, a young man whose body gained the properties of rubber after unintentionally eating a Devil Fruit. With his crew, named the Straw Hat Pirates, Luffy explores the Grand Line in search of the world's ultimate treasure known as the "One Piece" in order to become the next King of the Pirates.

Since its premiere in Japan, more than 1,100 episodes have aired and were later exported to over 80 countries internationally.

== Episodes ==
One Piece story arcs
Arc	Manga		Toei Anime		Live	
Arc	Chp.	Vol.	S	Ep.	S	Ep.
East Blue
Romance Dawn	1–7	1	S1	1–4	S1	1
Orange Town	8–21	1–4	S1	5–8	S1	2
Defeat Him! The Pirate Ganzack	—N/a		OVA			
Syrup Village	22–41	3–5	S1	9–18	S1	3–4
Baratie	42–68	5–8	S1	19–30	S1	5–8
Arlong Park	69–95	8–11	S1	31–44	S1	5–8
Buggy's Crew: After the Battle!	35–75 (covers)	4–9	S1	46–47		
Loguetown	96–100	11–12	S1	45; 48–53	S2	9
Warship Island	—N/a		S1	54–61		
Alabasta / Baroque Works
Reverse Mountain / Into the Grand Line	101–105	12	S2	62–63	S2	10
Whiskey Peak	106–114	12–13	S2	64–67	S2	11
Koby and Helmeppo's Chronicle of Toil	83–119 (covers)	10–14	S2	68–69		
Little Garden	115–129	13–15	S2	70–77	S2	12–13
Drum Island	130–154	15–17	S3	78–91	S2	14–16
Django's Dance Paradise	126–172 (covers)	14–19	—N/a			
Alabasta	155–217	17–24	S3/ S4	92–130		
Dreams!	—N/a		S5	131–135		
Sky Island
Goat Island / The Zenny Pirate Crew Sortie!	—N/a		S5	136–138		
Ruluka Island / Beyond the Rainbow	—N/a		S5	139–143		
Hachi's Walk on the Sea Floor	182–228 (covers)	20–25	—N/a			
Jaya	218–236	24–25	S6	144–152		
Skypiea	237–302	26–32	S6	153–195		
Wapol's Omnivorous Rampage	236–262 (covers)	25–28	—N/a			
G-8 / The Naval Fortress	—N/a		S7	196–206		
Water 7
Ace's Great Search for Blackbeard	272–305 (covers)	29–32	—N/a			
Long Ring Long Land / The Foxy Pirate Crew	303–321	32–34	S7	207–219		
Gedatsu's Unexpected Life on the Blue Sea	314–348 (covers)	33–37	—N/a			
Ocean's Dream	—N/a		S7	220–224		
Foxy's Return	—N/a		S7	225–228		
Water 7	322–374	34–39	S8	229–263		
Enies Lobby	375–441	39–46	S9	264–290; 293–302; 304–325		
Miss Goldenweek's Big Plan, A Baroque Reunion	359–413 (covers)	38–43	—N/a			
Boss Luffy Historical Special	—N/a		S9	291–292; 303		
Boss Luffy Historical Special	—N/a		S11	406–407		
Thriller Bark
Ice Hunter	—N/a		S9	326–335		
Chopper Man	—N/a		S9	336		
Eneru's Great Space Mission	428–474 (covers)	44–49	—N/a			
Thriller Bark	442–489	46–50	S10	337–381		
CP9's Independent Report	491–528 (covers)	50–54	—N/a			
Spa Island	—N/a		S11	382–384		
Romance Dawn (one-shot, version 1)	Akamaru Jump		OVA			
Summit War
Sabaody Archipelago	490–513	50–53	S11	385–405		
Amazon Lily / Island of Women	514–524	53–54	S12	408–417		
The Friends' Whereabouts	543–560 (covers)	56–57	S12	418–421		
The Friends' Whereabouts	543–560 (covers)	56–57	S13	453–456		
Impel Down	525–549	54–56	S13/ S14	422–425; 430–452; 457-458		
Little East Blue (Strong World)	—N/a		S13	426–429		
Marineford / Paramount War	550–597	56–61	S14	459–491; 493–516		
Toriko × One Piece	—N/a		S14	492		
Fish-Man Island / New World
Return to Sabaody	598–602	61	S15	517–522		
Fish-Man Island	603–653	61–66	S15	523–541; 543–574		
Decks of the World	613–668 (covers)	62–68	—N/a			
Toriko × One Piece	—N/a		S15	542		
Dressrosa
Z's Ambition (Z)	—N/a		S15	575–578		
Punk Hazard	654–699	66–70	S16	579–589; 591–625		
Caribou's New World Kee Hee Hee	674–731 (covers)	68–73	S20	921		
Toriko × One Piece × Dragon Ball Z	—N/a		S16	590		
Caesar Retrieval	—N/a		S16	626–628		
Dressrosa	700–801	70–80	S17	629–746		
The Solitary Journey of Jimbei, First Son of the Sea	751–785 (covers)	75–78	—N/a			
Whole Cake Island
Silver Mine (Gold)	—N/a		S18	747–750		
Zou	802–822	80–82	S18	751–779		
Decks of the World, 500-Million-Man Arc	805–838 (covers)	80–83	—N/a			
Marine Rookie	—N/a		S18	780–782		
Whole Cake Island	823–908	82–90	S19	783–891		
The Saga of the Self-Proclaimed Straw Hat Fleet	864–919 (covers)	86–91	—N/a			
Land of Wano
Germa 66's Ahh ... An Emotionless Excursion	1035–1078 (covers)	102–107	—N/a			
Land of Wano, Act One	909–924	90–92	S20	892–894; 897–906; 908–916		
Cidre Guild (Stampede)	—N/a		S20	895–896		
Romance Dawn (one-shot, version 2)	Wanted!		S20	907		
Land of Wano, Act Two	925–955	92–94	S20	917–956		
Gang Bege's Oh My Family	948–994 (covers)	94–98	—N/a			
Land of Wano, Act Three	956–1057	95–105	S20	957–1028; 1031–1088		
Uta's Past (Red)	—N/a		S20	1029–1030		
Egghead / Elbaph
Egghead	1058–1125	105–111	S21	1089–1155		
Ogre Child Yamato's Golden Harvest Surrogate Pilgrimage	1109–1162 (covers)	109–114	—N/a			
Elbaph	1126–present	111–TBA	S22	1156–present		

Season	Main arc title(s)	Episodes	Originally released	
Season	Main arc title(s)	Episodes	First released	Last released
1	East Blue	61	October 20, 1999	March 7, 2001
2	Entering into the Grand Line	16	March 21, 2001	August 19, 2001
3	Introducing Chopper at Drum Kingdom	15	August 26, 2001	December 9, 2001
4	Alabasta	38	December 16, 2001	October 27, 2002
5	TV Original	13	November 3, 2002	February 2, 2003
6	Skypiea	52	February 9, 2003	June 13, 2004
7	Escape! The Naval Fortress & The Foxy Pirate Crew	33	June 20, 2004	March 27, 2005
8	Water Seven	35	April 17, 2005	April 30, 2006
9	Enies Lobby	73	May 21, 2006	December 23, 2007
10	Thriller Bark	45	January 6, 2008	December 14, 2008
11	Sabaody Archipelago	26	December 21, 2008	June 28, 2009
12	Amazon Lily	14	July 5, 2009	October 11, 2009
13	Impel Down	35	October 18, 2009	June 20, 2010
14	Marineford	60	June 27, 2010	September 25, 2011
15	Fish-Man Island	62	October 2, 2011	December 23, 2012
16	Punk Hazard	50	January 6, 2013	January 12, 2014
17	Dressrosa	118	January 19, 2014	June 19, 2016
18	Zou	36	June 26, 2016	April 2, 2017
19	Whole Cake Island	109	April 9, 2017	June 30, 2019
20	Wano Country	197	July 7, 2019	December 17, 2023
21	Egghead	67	January 7, 2024	December 28, 2025
22	Elbaph	25	April 5, 2026	TBA

== Voice cast and characters ==
Character	Japanese	English (Toei Animation / Crunchyroll)
Monkey D. Luffy	Mayumi Tanaka	Colleen Clinkenbeard
Roronoa Zoro	Kazuya Nakai	Christopher Sabat
Nami	Akemi Okamura	Luci Christian
Usopp	Kappei Yamaguchi	Sonny Strait
Sanji	Hiroaki Hirata	Eric Vale
Tony Tony Chopper	Ikue Ōtani	Brina Palencia
Nico Robin	Yuriko Yamaguchi	Stephanie Young
Franky	Kazuki Yao (until 2024); Subaru Kimura (from 2025)	Patrick Seitz
Brook	Chō	Ian Sinclair
Jimbei	Daisuke Gori (2009); Katsuhisa Hoki (2010–present)	Daniel Baugh
Narrator	Mahito Ohba	Bill Jenkins

== Production ==
=== Release ===
In October 2024, it was announced that the anime series would go on hiatus until April 2025, and that a remastered and re-edited version of the Fishman Island story arc would air in the show's timeslot during the break. After returning, the show moved to Sunday nights for the first time since 2006, marking the anime's return to a primetime network timeslot. Episode 1123 premiered on April 5, 2025, as part of the network's Premium Saturday timeslot before moving to its fixed Sunday night slot a day later, beginning with episode 1124 on April 6.

A "special episode" set after the events of the Wano Country arc, titled "Luffy, Law", was screened at the MBS Anime Fest 2025 on February 19, 2025, and was released onto the series' official YouTube channel the following day.

On October 28, 2025, it was announced that the series would go on hiatus from January to March 2026. It resumed with the Elbaph arc on April 5, 2026, and will adopt a divided, two-cours-per-year structure, with a maximum of 26 episodes annually. This marks a shift from the continuous year-round structure that has been in place since the series' premiere in 1999.

=== English localization and broadcasting ===
On June 8, 2004, 4Kids Entertainment acquired the license for distribution of One Piece in North America; 4Kids Entertainment contracted Viz Media to handle home video distribution. 4Kids' in-house musicians wrote a new background score and theme song nicknamed "Pirate Rap". 4Kids' dub mandated edits for content and length, which reduced the first 143 episodes into 104. Initially, 4Kids originally created an English version of the first opening theme, "We Are!" by Russell Velazquez. It premiered in the United States on September 18, 2004, on various Fox affiliated and independent television stations as part of the weekend programming block FoxBox, and later aired on Cartoon Network on their Saturday night action programming block, Toonami in April 2005. It also aired in other blocks and line-ups, such as its Monday-Thursday night prime-time line-up and its Miguzi weekday after-school action block in 2006. Production was halted in 2006 after episode 143/104; Viz also ceased its home video release of the series after volume 11. On July 22, 2010, an interview with Anime News Network and Mark Kirk, senior vice-president of digital media for 4Kids Entertainment, revealed that 4Kids acquired One Piece as part of a package deal with other anime, and that the company did not screen the series before licensing it. However, once 4Kids realized One Piece was not appropriate for their intended demographic, the company decided to edit it into a more child-oriented series until they had an opportunity to legally drop the license. Kirk said the experience of producing One Piece "ruined the company's reputation". Since then, 4Kids established a stricter set of guidelines, checks, and balances to determine which anime the company acquires.

On April 13, 2007, Funimation (later Crunchyroll, LLC) licensed the series and started production on an English-language release of One Piece which also included re-dubbing the episodes previously dubbed by 4Kids. In an interview with voice actor Christopher Sabat, he stated that Funimation had been interested in acquiring One Piece from the very beginning, and produced a "test episode," in which Sabat portrayed the character of Helmeppo and Eric Vale played the part of the main character, Monkey D. Luffy. (They would later go on to provide the English voices for Roronoa Zoro and Sanji, respectively.) After resuming production of the renewed English dub, which featured less censorship because of fewer restrictions on cable programming, Funimation released its first uncut, bilingual DVD box set containing 13 episodes on May 27, 2008, similarly sized sets followed with fourteen sets released. The Funimation dubbed episodes premiered on Cartoon Network on September 29, 2007 and aired until its removal on March 22, 2008. On October 28, 2011, Funimation posted a press release on their official website confirming the acquisition of episodes 206–263, and the aspect ratio, beginning with episode 207, would be changed to the 16:9 widescreen format. On May 18, 2013, the uncut series began airing on Adult Swim's revived Toonami late-night programming block skipping ahead to episode 207 onward. One Piece was removed from the Toonami block after March 18, 2017. The series returned to Toonami, skipping ahead to episode 517, on January 22, 2022.

In May 2009, Funimation, Toei Animation, Shueisha, and Fuji Television announced that they would simulcast the series on the official One Piece website and various Funimation-affiliated websites within an hour of the weekly Japanese broadcast, free of charge. Originally scheduled to begin on May 30, 2009, with episode 403, a lack of security resulted in a leak of the episode, and Funimation delayed the offer until episode 415 on August 29, 2009.

On February 12, 2013, it was announced that Manga Entertainment would start releasing the Funimation dub of One Piece in the United Kingdom in a DVD box set format. Crunchyroll began simulcasting the series on November 2, 2013, for the United States, Canada, South Africa, Australia, New Zealand, and Latin America. Crunchyroll later expanded access to the United Kingdom and Ireland, as well as a majority of European territories, on February 22, 2020. In April 2020, Netflix officially announced that they would be streaming One Piece starting on June 12 of the same year, for the United States, Canada, Australia, and New Zealand, using the "Special Edition" print. Netflix announced that they would stream the Egghead story arc starting on January 13, 2024.

== Films ==
A total of 15 animated theatrical films based on the One Piece series have been released in Japan. The films are typically released in March in accordance with the spring vacation of Japanese schools. The films feature self-contained, completely original plots, or retellings of story arcs with animation of a higher quality than what the weekly anime allows. The first three films were typically double features paired up with other anime films, and were thus usually an hour or less in length. Funimation (now Crunchyroll, LLC) licensed the eighth, tenth, twelfth, thirteenth, and fourteenth films for release in North America, and these films have received in-house dubs by the company.

No.	Title	Director	Writer	Release date	Runtime
1	One Piece: The Movie	Junji Shimizu	Michiru Shimada	March 4, 2000	51 minutes
2	Clockwork Island Adventure	Junji Shimizu	Michiru Shimada	March 3, 2001	55 minutes
3	Chopper's Kingdom on the Island of Strange Animals	Junji Shimizu	Michiru Shimada	March 2, 2002	56 minutes
4	Dead End Adventure	Konosuke Uda	Yoshiyuki Suga	March 1, 2003	1 hr 35 min
5	The Cursed Holy Sword	Kazuhisa Takenouchi	Yoshiyuki Suga	March 6, 2004	1 hr 35 min
6	Baron Omatsuri and the Secret Island	Mamoru Hosoda	Masahiro Itō	March 5, 2005	1 hr 32 min
7	Giant Mecha Soldier of Karakuri Castle	Kōnosuke Uda	Masahiro Itō	March 4, 2006	1 hr 35 min
8	The Desert Princess and the Pirates: Adventures in Alabasta	Takahiro Imamura	Hirohiko Kamisaka	March 3, 2007	1 hr 30 min
9	Episode of Chopper Plus: Bloom in the Winter, Miracle Cherry Blossom	Junji Shimizu	Hirohiko Kamisaka	March 1, 2008	1 hr 53 min
10	One Piece Film: Strong World	Munehisa Sakai	Hirohiko Kamisaka	December 12, 2009	1 hr 53 min
11	Straw Hat Chase	Hiroyuki Satō	Yasuyuki Tsutsumi	March 19, 2011	30 minutes
12	One Piece Film: Z	Tatsuya Nagamine	Osamu Suzuki	December 15, 2012	1 hr 47 min
13	One Piece Film: Gold	Hiroaki Miyamoto	Tsutomu Kuroiwa	July 23, 2016	2 hours
14	One Piece: Stampede	Takashi Otsuka	Atsuhiro Tomioka, Takashi Otsuka	August 9, 2019	1 hr 41 min
15	One Piece Film: Red	Gorō Taniguchi	Tsutomu Kuroiwa	August 6, 2022	1 hr 55 min
16	One Piece Film: God Valley	TBA	TBA	Q3 2027	TBA
17	One Piece Film: BAAD	TBA	TBA	2029	TBA

== Television specials ==
The One Piece franchise has spawned 13 television specials that aired on Fuji Television. Of these specials, the first four, as well as the sixth, eighth, ninth, and eleventh are original stories created by the anime staff with the exception of the fifth, seventh, tenth, twelfth, and thirteenth specials, which are alternate re-tellings of certain story arcs.

No.	Title	Director	Airdate	Runtime	Ref(s)
1	One Piece TV Special: Adventure in the Ocean's Navel	Yukio Kaizawa	December 20, 2000	50 minutes	
2	One Piece: Open Upon the Great Sea! A Father's Huge, Huge Dream	Munehisa Sakai	April 6, 2003	46 minutes	
3	"One Piece: Protect! The Last Great Stage"	Junji Shimizu	December 14, 2003	46 minutes	
4	"One Piece: End-of-Year Special Plan! Chief Straw Hat Luffy's Detective Story"	N/A	December 18, 2005	42 minutes	
5	"Episode of Nami: Tears of a Navigator and the Bonds of Friends"	Katsumi Tokoro	August 25, 2012	1 hr 46 min	
6	"Episode of Luffy: Adventure on Hand Island"	Hiroyuki Morita, Mitsuru Hongo	December 15, 2012	1 hr 42 min	
7	"Episode of Merry: The Tale of One More Friend"	Katsumi Tokoro	August 24, 2013	1 hr 46 min	
8	"~~3D~~2Y"	Naoyuki Itou	August 30, 2014	1 hr 47 min	
9	"Episode of Sabo: The Three Brothers' Bond – The Miraculous Reunion and the Inherited Will"	Gou Koga	August 22, 2015	1 hr 46 min	
10	"One Piece: Adventure of Nebulandia"	Kōnosuke Uda	December 19, 2015	1 hr 46 min	
11	"One Piece: Heart of Gold"	Tatsuya Nagamine	July 23, 2016	1 hr 44 min	
12	"One Piece: Episode of East Blue: Luffy and His 4 Friends' Great Adventure"	Takashi Otsuka	August 26, 2017	1 hr 46 min	
13	"One Piece: Episode of Skypiea"	Tetsuya Endo	August 25, 2018	2 hr 10 min	

== OVAs ==
No.	Title	Length	Airdate	Note	Ref(s)
1	"Romance Dawn Story"	33 minutes	September 21, 2008	Extra episode	
2	"Strong World: Episode 0"	18 minutes	December 12, 2009	Animated version of Chapter 0 and prequel to One Piece Film: Strong World	
3	"Glorious Island" Part 1	5 minutes	December 23, 2012	Prequel to One Piece Film: Z	
4	"Glorious Island" Part 2	5 minutes	December 30, 2012	Prequel to One Piece Film: Z	
5	"One Piece Film: Gold Episode 0"	10 minutes	July 2, 2016	Prequel to One Piece Film: Gold	
6	"Romance Dawn"		October 20, 2019	Episode 907 of the series, created in celebration of the series' 20th anniversary	

=== Shorts ===
No.	Title	Release date	Length
1	Jango's Dance Carnival	March 3, 2001	5 minutes and 30 seconds
2	Dream Soccer King	March 2, 2002	5 minutes and 30 seconds
3	One Piece: The Adventure in Grand Line	July 6, 2002	20 minutes
4	Take Aim! The Pirate Baseball King	March 6, 2004	5 minutes and 30 seconds
5	One Piece 3D! Trap Coaster	December 1, 2011	12 minutes
6	The Great Treasure of Tongari Island	April 21, 2018	11 minutes
7	Luffy, Law	January 19, 2025	5 minutes

== Music ==
Music soundtracks have been released that are based on songs that premiered in the series. Kohei Tanaka and Shiro Hamaguchi composed the score for One Piece. Various theme songs and character songs were released.

The anime television series consists of 51 pieces of theme music: 27 opening themes and 21 ending themes. As of episode 279, ending themes were omitted and, starting from episode 326 onwards, opening themes were extended from 110 seconds long to 150 seconds long. In episodes 1–206 of Crunchyroll's English-language release of the series, the opening and ending themes were dubbed into English by various voice actors, before reverting to the Japanese versions from episodes 207 onwards, focusing on only insert songs that are sung by the characters instead, and some openings were not licensed by Crunchyroll's release at the time, which is also affected by all territories. Starting with episode 1071, the ending theme has been reinstated after 17 years.

On August 11, 2019, it was announced that Sakuramen, a musical group will be collaborating with Kohei Tanaka to compose music for the anime's 20th season.

=== Opening theme songs ===
No.	Title	Original artist	English artist	Episodes		Total	
No.	Title	Original artist	English artist	Original	International release	Total	
1	"We Are!"	Hiroshi Kitadani	Russell Velazquez (4Kids; unused); Vic Mignogna, Jerry Jewell (Note: The alternative English version of the song is only used in the TV edited broadcast of episode 152.) (Crunchyroll) (Note: Unused in episode 1000)	1–47, 1000		48	
2	"Believe"	Folder 5	Meredith McCoy	48–115		68	
3	"Hikari e"	The Babystars	Vic Mignogna	116–168		53	
4	"Bon Voyage!"	Bon-Bon Blanco	Brina Palencia	169–206		38	
5	"Kokoro no Chizu"	Boystyle	N/A (not dubbed)	207–263		57	
6	"Brand New World"	D-51	N/A (not dubbed)	264–278		15	
7	"We Are! (7 Straw Hat Pirates Ver.)"	7 Straw Hat Pirates	N/A (not dubbed)	279–283	279–325	5	47
8	"Crazy Rainbow"	Tackey & Tsubasa	N/A (not dubbed)	284–325	Unlicensed	42	—
9	"Jungle P"	5050	N/A (not dubbed)	326–372	326–458	47	133
10	"We Are! (One Piece Animation 10th Anniversary Ver.)"	TVXQ	N/A (not dubbed)	373–394	Unlicensed	22	—
11	"Share the World!"	TVXQ	N/A (not dubbed)	395–425	Unlicensed	31	—
12	"Kaze o Sagashite"	Mari Yaguchi with the Straw Hats	N/A (not dubbed)	426–458	Unlicensed	33	—
13	"One Day"	The Rootless	N/A (not dubbed)	459–492		34	
14	"Fight Together"	Namie Amuro	N/A (not dubbed)	493–516		24	
15	"We Go!"	Hiroshi Kitadani	N/A (not dubbed)	517–590	517–628	74	112
16	"Hands Up!"	Kota Shinzato	N/A (not dubbed)	591–628	Unlicensed	38	—
17	"Wake Up!"	AAA	N/A (not dubbed)	629–686		58	
18	"Hard Knock Days"	Generations from Exile Tribe	N/A (not dubbed)	687–746		60	
19	"We Can!"	Kishidan and Hiroshi Kitadani	N/A (not dubbed)	747–806 (Note: From episodes 753–756, the special opening movie, featuring scenes from "One Piece Film: Gold", was not licensed.)		60	
20	"Hope" (Note: This song was from Namie Amuro's best album, "Finally", which is credited in episodes 809–855.)	Namie Amuro	N/A (not dubbed)	807–855		49	
21	"Super Powers"	V6	N/A (not dubbed)	856–891		36	
22	"Over the Top"	Hiroshi Kitadani	N/A (not dubbed)	892–934		43	
23	"Dreamin' On"	Da-ice	N/A (not dubbed)	935–999, 1001–1004		69	
24	"Paint"	I Don't Like Mondays.	N/A (not dubbed)	1005–1027, 1031–1073	1005–1073	66	69
SP	"New Genesis (Uta from One Piece Film: Red)" (Note: This song is credited as the theme song of "One Piece Film: Red".)	Ado	N/A (not dubbed)	1028–1030 (Note: Japanese broadcast only)	Unlicensed	3	
25	"The Peak"	Sekai no Owari	N/A (not dubbed)	1074–1088		15	
26	"Uuuuus!"	Hiroshi Kitadani	N/A (not dubbed)	1089–1122		34	
27	"Angels and Demons"	Gre4n Boyz	N/A (not dubbed)	1123–1138 (Note: This song is also used as a special ending theme in episode 1137.)		16	
28	"Carmine"	Ellegarden	N/A (not dubbed)	1139–1155		17	
29	"Luminous"	Aina the End	N/A (not dubbed)	1156–1180		25	

Alternates

1. "One Piece Rap" (4Kids)
  - Version 1: (episodes 1–29)
  - Version 2: (episodes 30–59) (inclusion of Sanji and Usopp in the lyrics)
  - Version 3: (episodes 60–104) (inclusion of Chopper in the lyrics)

=== Ending theme songs ===
#	Title	Original artist	English artist	Episodes	Total
1	"Memories"	Maki Otsuki	Brina Palencia	1–30	30
2	"Run! Run! Run!"	Maki Otsuki	Caitlin Glass	31–63	33
3	"Watashi ga Iru Yo"	Tomato Cube	Leah Clark	64–73	10
4	"Shōchi no Suke"	Suitei Shojo	Stephanie Young	74–81	8
5	"Before Dawn"	Ai-Sachi	Kristine Sa	82–94	13
6	"Fish"	The Kaleidoscope	Leah Clark	95-106	12
7	"Glory -Kimi ga Iru Kara-"	Takako Uehara	Caitlin Glass	107–118	12
8	"Shining Ray"	Janne da Arc	Justin Houston	119–132	13
9	"Free Will"	Ruppina	Allan Jensen	133–155	24
10	"Faith"	Ruppina	Caitlin Glass	156–168	12
11	"A to Z (One Piece Edition)"	ZZ	Vic Mignogna	169–181	13
12	"Tsuki to Taiyō"	Shela	Stephanie Young	182–195	14
13	"Dreamship"	Aiko Ikuta	Jessi James	196–206	11
14	"Mirai Kōkai"	Tackey & Tsubasa	N/A (swapped with ending 15)	207–230	24
15	"Eternal Pose"	Asia Engineer	N/A (not dubbed)	231–245	15
16	"Dear Friends"	Triplane	N/A (not dubbed)	246–255	10
17	"Asu wa Kuru Kara"	TVXQ	N/A (not dubbed)	256–263	8
18	"Adventure World"	Delicatessen	N/A (not dubbed)	264–278	15
19	"Raise"	Chilli Beans.	N/A (not dubbed)	1071–1088	18
20	"Dear Sunrise"	Maki Otsuki	N/A (not dubbed)	1089–1122	34
21	"The 1"	Muque	N/A (not dubbed)	1123–1139	15
22	"Punks"	Chameleon Lime Whoopie Pie	N/A (not dubbed)	1139–1155	17
23	"Sono Mirai"	36km/h	N/A (not dubbed)	1156–	TBD

=== Other music ===
On December 23, 2019, a teaser video was uploaded on Arashi's YouTube channel, in collaboration with the anime. The 39-second video for the song A-ra-shi: Reborn, has the 5 animated members of the band mingling with the crew from the anime, up until the moment when Arashi is about to give a concert. The full version video was released on January 4, 2020.

For the One Piece Log: Fishman Island Saga, the opening theme for the first nine episodes as well as the ending theme for the One Piece Fan Letter special is a new version of the "We Go!" opening theme, performed by the Straw Hat Pirates; another version of the song performed by Hikakin & Seikin with Mayumi Tanaka (credited as Monkey D. Luffy) is used from episodes 10–13; another version by Hololive's Shirakami Fubuki, Houshou Marine and Tsunomaki Watame with Maki Otsuki from episodes 14–17; and a final version by Hololive English's Takanashi Kiara and Hakos Baelz and Hololive Indonesia's Kobo Kanaeru with Hiroshi Kitadani for the rest of the series, and the ending theme is "Sailing", performed by Be First.

== Reception ==
=== Ratings ===
The anime has been very well received. The first episode of the anime adaptation earned a viewer rating of 12.4%, behind Pokémon and ahead of Ojamajo Doremi. In Japan, One Piece has consistently been among the top five animated shows in television viewer ratings, as of 2020.

On international online video platforms, the One Piece anime got 1.9 million demand expressions per month in 2016, making it the year's most popular anime and fourteenth most popular TV show in the world, according to Business Insider. In the United States, where it is available on the Hulu streaming platform, One Piece was 2018's most binge-watched television show in the states of Illinois and Wisconsin.

In 2022, One Piece was the most watched TV show of the year in the world, beating Stranger Things, and Monkey D. Luffy was ranked as one of the top three world's most popular characters according to TV Time, a popular tracking service.

=== Critical reception ===
In a review of the second DVD release of 4Kids Entertainment's dub, Todd Douglass, Jr. of DVD Talk called its adaptation a "shabby treatment" resulting in an "arguably less enjoyable rendition". Douglass said that the 4Kids original opening was "a crappy rap song" and that the removal of whole scenes leaves a "feeling that something is missing". He later went on to say that "Fans of the 'real' One Piece will want to skip picking [...] up [4Kids Entertainment's One Piece DVDs] until an uncut release is announced", and also stated that "kids may get into this version because it's what they have seen on TV". Margaret Veira of activeAnime praised the TV series' "great" animation, stating that "It gives life and stays true to the style and characters of the manga." She notes the fight scenes in particular have "a lot of energy to them". Patrick King of Animefringe comments that the art style of One Piece is "very distinctive and fresh".

In a review of the first Funimation DVD release for Mania Entertainment, Bryce Coulter comments that One Piece is "not your typical pirate adventure" and that mixed with "the right amount of random fun along with a shonen style storyline" it becomes "an appealing and fun romp". In a review of Funimation's second DVD release for Mania Entertainment, Bryce Coulter comments that "You can tell that they are giving One Piece the attention that was neglected by 4Kids" and that "One Piece is a great tale of high-seas fun that will leave you wanting more!"

In Indonesia, Global TV was reprimanded by the Indonesian Broadcasting Commission (KPI) for airing the anime television series. Nina Armando, member of the KPI and a lecturer at the University of Indonesia, said the show should not be aired at times when children are likely to watch.

=== Accolades ===
Accolades received by One Piece
Award	Date of ceremony	Category	Recipient(s)	Result	Ref.
Animation Kobe	2000	Theme Song Award	"We Are!"	Won	
Fifth Annual TV DVD Awards	2008	Best International TV DVD	One Piece: Season 1 First Voyage	Nominated	
3rd Crunchyroll Anime Awards	February 16, 2019	Best Continuing Series	One Piece	Nominated	
7th Crunchyroll Anime Awards	March 4, 2023	Best Continuing Series	One Piece	Won	
8th Crunchyroll Anime Awards	March 2, 2024	Best Continuing Series	One Piece	Won	
8th Crunchyroll Anime Awards	March 2, 2024	Best Action	One Piece	Nominated	
8th Crunchyroll Anime Awards	March 2, 2024	Best Main Character	Monkey D. Luffy	Won	
8th Crunchyroll Anime Awards	March 2, 2024	Best Voice Artist Performance(Japanese)	Mayumi Tanaka as Monkey D. Luffy	Nominated	
8th Crunchyroll Anime Awards	March 2, 2024	Best Voice Artist Performance(Portuguese)	Guilherme Briggs as Brook	Nominated	
9th Crunchyroll Anime Awards	May 25, 2025	Best Continuing Series	One Piece	Nominated	
9th Crunchyroll Anime Awards	May 25, 2025	Best Director	Megumi Ishitani (Fan Letter)	Nominated	
9th Crunchyroll Anime Awards	May 25, 2025	Best Opening Sequence	"Uuuuus!" by Hiroshi Kitadani	Nominated	
9th Crunchyroll Anime Awards	May 25, 2025	Best Voice Artist Performance (German)	Daniel Schlauch as Monkey D. Luffy	Won	
The Anime & Manga International Awards	August 21–24, 2025	Most IcoNYC Anime of All Time	One Piece	Won	
TikTok Awards Japan	December 5, 2025	Anime of the Year	One Piece	Won	
TVer Awards	March 2, 2026	Best Anime Episode	One Piece	Won	
10th Crunchyroll Anime Awards	May 23, 2026	Best Continuing Series	One Piece	Won	
10th Crunchyroll Anime Awards	May 23, 2026	Best Action	One Piece	Nominated	
10th Crunchyroll Anime Awards	May 23, 2026	Best Animation	One Piece	Nominated	
10th Crunchyroll Anime Awards	May 23, 2026	Best Character Design	Midori Matsuda	Nominated	
10th Crunchyroll Anime Awards	May 23, 2026	Best Voice Artist Performance (Japanese)	Mayumi Tanaka as Monkey D. Luffy	Nominated	
10th Crunchyroll Anime Awards	May 23, 2026	Best Voice Artist Performance (Castilian Spanish)	Marisa Marciel as Nami	Nominated	
Manga Barcelona Awards	December 5, 2026	Best Anime Dubbed in Catalan	One Piece	Pending	

== See also ==
- List of One Piece media
