= The Babystars =

Japanese rock band

- Origin: Japan
- Genres: Alternative rock
- Years active: 1996–2014
- Labels: Sony Music Japan; Ki/oon Records
- Past members: Akihito Tanaka; Rikiya Takahashi; Yōsuke Ichikawa; Tomaru Asami
- Website: Official Site

The Babystars (ザ・ベイビースターズ, Za Beibīsutāzu) were a Japanese rock band. The band is signed onto Sony Music Japan's Ki/oon Records label. They came out with the song "Hikari e" in 2002. This song is known as the third opening theme of the anime series One Piece. Later in 2004, their seventh single, "SUNDAY", became the first ending theme of the anime series Yakitate!! Japan. On May 31, 2006, Yōsuke Ichikawa and Asami Tomaru left the band.

== Past Member ==
- Akihito Tanaka (田中 明仁, Tanaka Akihito) — vocals, guitars
- Rikiya Takahashi (高橋 りきや, Takahashi Rikiya) — guitars
- Yōsuke Ichikawa (市川 洋介, Ichikawa Yōsuke) — keyboards
- Tomaru Asami (浅見 トマル, Asami Tomaru) — drums

== Discography ==
=== Singles ===
- Hikari E (ヒカリへ; "To the Light") (July 24, 2002) (Charted for 27 weeks)
1. Hikari E (3rd opening theme for One Piece)
2. happy days?
3. Hikari E (Instrumental)
- Nande (なんで; "Why?") (October 23, 2002)
1. Nande
2. Kumori no Chihare
3. Hikari E Acoustic In-store Mix (ヒカリへ <アコースティック･インストア･ミックス>)
- Orange (オレンジ, Orenji) (March 5, 2003)
1. Orange
2. Sakura Sakukoro (サクラサクコロ)
- Young Young Young (ヤング・ヤング・ヤング, Yangu Yangu Yangu) (April 9, 2003)
1. Young Young Young (ヤング☆ヤング☆ヤング)
- Sari Yuku Kimi E (去りゆく君へ; "To You, Who is Leaving Me") (October 8, 2003)
1. Sari Yuku Kimi E
2. Rocket
- Natsu no Chikara (夏のちから; "Power of Summer") (August 25, 2004)
1. Natsu no Chikara
2. Hajimari no Toki (はじまりの時; First Time)
- SUNDAY (November 10, 2004)
1. SUNDAY (1st ending theme for Yakitate Japan)
2. My Stride
- WORLD (March 1, 2006)
1. World
2. Prologue (プロローグ, Purorōgu)

=== Albums ===
- Bebisuta (ベビスタ) (April 9, 2003)
1. Spiral (スパイラル, Supairaru)
2. Sakura Sakukoro
3. Hikari E
4. 恋愛力
5. Nande
6. LITTLE STAR
7. love
8. Orange
9. Young Young Young
10. Kumori no Chihare
11. Eien ni Saku Hana -evergreen- (永遠に咲く花 ～evergreen～)
- laugh → love (December 1, 2004)
1. SUNDAY
2. aria
3. アールグレイ
4. Natsu no Chikara
5. Hoeru (吠える; "Bark")
6. OVER (Bonus Track)
7. Egao no Hōsoku (笑顔の法則; "The Law of Smile")
8. Niman'en (二万円; "20,000 Yen")
9. 360° Camera (360°カメラ)
10. Dice Caramel (サイコロキャラメル, Saikoro Kyarameru)
11. Wind Color (風色)
12. Sari Yuku Kimi E
13. Flash (閃光, Senkou)
- LIFE (November 7, 2007)
1. Seven Colors (七色)
2. Utsu Byō Nan Desu (うつ病なんです)
3. Owaranai Love Song (終わらないラブソング)
4. Dream and Pocket (夢とポケット, Yume to Poketto)
5. afternoon cafe
6. Aisaretai (愛されたい)
7. spend my life
8. SUN
9. Echo (響, Hibiki)
10. Mata Au Hi Made (また会う日まで)
