= One Piece season 11 =

Season 11 of the anime television series based on the manga One Piece

One Piece
- Season 11; Sabaody Archipelago
- The cover of the first DVD compilation released by Avex Mode of the eleventh season.
- No. of episodes: 26

Release
- Original network: Fuji Television
- Original release: December 21, 2008 – June 28, 2009

Season chronology
- ← Previous; Season 10 Next → Season 12

The eleventh season of the One Piece anime series was produced by Toei Animation, and directed by Hiroaki Miyamoto based on Eiichiro Oda's manga by the same name. The majority of the season covers the "Sabaody Archipelago" story arc, which deals with the Straw Hats preparing to enter Fishman Island by having their ship coated for undersea travel. During their stay, they meet an old enemy Hatchan, his friends Camie and Papaggu, and the first mate of Gold Roger, Silvers Rayleigh, as well as 9 rookie pirates known as the "11 Supernovas". In an incident involving the auction of Camie, the crew and the pirates are attacked by top members of the Marines, including Bartholomew Kuma, one of the Seven Warlords of the Sea. The final two episodes continue the "History Drama Boss Luffy" story established in the fourth TV Special and featured in the ninth season.

The season aired on Fuji Television from December 21, 2008, to June 28, 2009, and consisted of 26 episodes. The first two DVD compilations of the series were released on January 7, 2011 with two individual volumes released monthly and the last DVD compilations were released on March 2, 2011. This season's episode count and title were announced in the One Piece Movie 10 Guide Book, "One Piece-Pia".

The season uses two different pieces of theme music. The first opening, a cover version of the first opening theme "We Are!" (ウィーアー!) by Hiroshi Kitadani, is performed by TVXQ, as "We Are! (Animation One Piece 10th Anniversary Ver.)", who also performs the season's second opening theme, titled "Share the World", starting with episode 395 onwards.

== Episodes ==
No. overall	No. in season	Title	Directed by	Written by	Original release date	English air date
Spa Island
382	1	"The Slow-Slow Menace! 'Silver Fox' Foxy Returns!"; Transliteration: "Noro Noro no Kyōi – Gingitsune no Fokushī Futatabi" (Japanese: ノロノロの脅威 銀狐のフォクシー再び)	Tetsuya Endō	Takuya Masumoto	December 21, 2008	March 5, 2017
The Straw Hats take a vacation at Spa Island, a ship with luxury facilities that even serves pirates and criminals, but while there, they encounter Foxy and his crew, who are pursuing two small girls: Lina and her older sister Sayo. The Straw Hats manage to defeat the Foxy Pirates, and learn that they had been pursuing Lina and Sayo for the girls' notebook, which shows their father's research on how to create a special gem, the solution for which can be found on the ship. Lina considers her father a liar, but Sayo believes him. Suddenly, Sayo is abducted, and the owner of the island, Doran, says that if they want her back, they must complete the research and find the gem.
383	2	"The Great Scramble for Treasure! Collapse! Spa Island!"; Transliteration: "Otakara Daisōdatsusen! Hōkai! Supa Airando-gō" (Japanese: お宝大争奪戦! 崩壊! スパアイランド号)	Directed by : Makoto Sonoda; Storyboarded by : Tetsuya Endō	Takuya Masumoto	December 28, 2008	March 12, 2017
After Lina reveals that she has searched all over the ship, Luffy decides to destroy the ship in order to find Sayo. The Straw Hats manage to fight off Doran's men, but Doran unveils a large cannon and aims it at Sayo. Sayo tells Lina that their father truly cared for them and believed that his research would bear fruit, and left in order to protect them from his pursuers. The Straw Hats manage to rescue Sayo and destroy Spa Island, and notice that the X on Lina's father's map pointed to an X-shaped underwater volcano opening beneath the island. Several days later, Sayo and Lina complete the gem and send it to the Straw Hats, but as candy rain falls on the Sunny, Luffy accidentally loses it.
384	3	"Brook's Great Struggle! Is the Path to Becoming a True Comrade Rigorous?"; Transliteration: "Burukku Daifuntō – Shin no Nakama e no Michi Kewashi?" (Japanese: ブルック大奮闘 真の仲間への道険し?)	Naoyuki Itō	Yoshiyuki Suga	January 11, 2009	March 19, 2017
Brook, having heard of the Straw Hats' adventures while reading their logbook, and not wanting to become a burden to them in the New World, decides to help out around the ship, but ends up causing problems with whatever he tries to do. Robin tells him that while she had feared being abandoned when her pursuers closed in on her, and that she had planned to sacrifice herself for them, they came through for her, and that he should not worry about his place in the crew. Note: This was the final episode of One Piece to air on Toonami until January 2022. The reason for the original removal of One Piece on the block was cited as lower than acceptable ratings by block runner Jason DeMarco.
Sabaody Archipelago
385	4	"Arriving at Halfway Through the Grand Line! The Red Line"; Transliteration: "Gurand Rain Hanshū Tōtatsu! Reddo Rain" (Japanese: 偉大なる航路半周到達! 赤い土の大陸)	Yutaka Nakashima	Isao Murayama	January 18, 2009	—
Sengoku complains about Kuma's sparing the Straw Hats, but Garp is confident that they will not talk about defeating Moria. The Straw Hats reach the Red Line, on the other side of the world where they entered the Grand Line, and briefly reflect on how far they have come and how far they have to go. Robin, Brook and Luffy investigate with the Shark Submerge to see how they could get to Fish-man Isle, but are unable to go deep enough to find any clues. A Sea Rabbit attacks them, and after they defeat it, it spits out a mermaid named Camie and her starfish companion, Pappagu.
386	5	"Hatred of the Straw Hat Crew – Enter Iron Mask Duval"; Transliteration: "Mugiwara Ichimi Nikushi – Tekkamen no Dyubaru Tōjō" (Japanese: 麦わら一味憎し 鉄仮面のデュバル登場)	Sumio Watanabe	Koga Naoki	January 25, 2009	—
Camie and Pappagu introduce themselves to the Straw Hats, who then later find out that their fish-man friend has been kidnapped by Iron Mask Duval and the Macro Gang. The Straw Hats set out to rescue him, and are attacked by Duval's henchmen, the Flying Fish Riders. When they recognise the Straw Hats' flag, they retreat and inform Duval that the man who ruined his life is approaching and he replies that he can't wait to have his revenge!
387	6	"The Fated Reunion! Save the Imprisoned Fish-man"; Transliteration: "Innen no Saikai! Toraware no Gyojin o Sukuidase" (Japanese: 因縁の再会! 囚われの魚人を救い出せ)	Yukihiko Nakao	Tsuyoshi Sakurai	February 1, 2009	—
The Straw Hats arrive at Duval's base noticing how quiet it is. They then find Camie's fish-man friend in a cage, only to recognize him as Hatchan, a former member of Arlong's crew. Luffy refuses to help him, so Camie and Pappagu try to rescue their friend on their own but are quickly captured by Macro Fishmen Pirates. The Straw Hats then decide to help, only to spring the trap Duval had planned for them.
388	7	"Tragedy! The Truth of the Unmasked Duval"; Transliteration: "Higeki! Kamen ni Kakusareta Dyubaru no Shinjitsu" (Japanese: 悲劇! 仮面に隠されたデュバルの真実)	Yoshihiro Ueda	Yoshiyuki Suga	February 8, 2009	—
The Flying Fish Riders launch their attack on the Straw Hats. Luffy tries riding one of them, but ends up underwater. Meanwhile, Hatchi is freed by Zoro, who hasn't fully healed from Thriller Bark. Luffy's second attempt at riding a flying fish sees him crash into Duval's room where he sees him without his helmet. During a brief fight with Luffy, Duval appears before the other Straw Hats, where he announces that the man he wants to kill is Sanji who has no idea who he is. Luffy then knocks his helmet off, revealing that he looks just like Sanji's wanted poster.
389	8	"Explosion! The Sunny's Super Secret Weapon: Gaon Cannon"; Transliteration: "Sakuretsu! Sanī-gō no Chōhimitsu Heiki Gaon Hō" (Japanese: 炸裂! サニー号の超秘密兵器ガオン砲)	Katsumi Tokoro	Yoshiyuki Suga	February 15, 2009	—
Duval reveals that he was once a small-time bandit until Sanji's wanted poster came to light. Since then, he hid his face with the iron mask until he would get revenge on Sanji. He then uses steel nets to nearly drown Sanji, until Camie saves him. And with that, Sanji deals a fatal kick combo at Duval's face. Meanwhile, the Flying Fish Riders attempt to crush the Thousand Sunny, but with the newly installed Gaon Cannon, they are quickly defeated.
390	9	"Landing to Get to Fish-man Island – The Sabaody Archipelago"; Transliteration: "Gyojintō o Mokushishite Jōriku – Shabondi Shotō" (Japanese: 魚人島を目指して上陸 シャボンディ諸島)	Hiroaki Miyamoto	Hirohiko Kamisaka	February 22, 2009	—
With the Flying Fish Riders taken care of, the Straw Hats rest as Hatchan treats them to the promised Takoyaki. Duval shows up again, not for revenge, but to thank Sanji since his kicks altered Duval's face to become handsome and suave, or so he thinks. To make up for the trouble he's caused, he leaves his Snail Phone number with the Straw Hats in case they may need his assistance before departing with the newly christened Rosy Life Riders. The Sunny sets sail for the Sabaody Archipelago, the stepping stone to Fish-man Island. Hatchan explains that one needs to have their ship coated with a bubble resin in order to travel underwater, and once they reach Sabaody, he promises to find them a ship coater that he trusts. He also warns them that the world nobility will be on the island, and no matter what happens, not to touch them, even if they witness a murder.
391	10	"Tyranny! The Rulers of Sabaody, the Celestial Dragons"; Transliteration: "Bōgyaku! Shabondi no Shihaisha Tenryūbito" (Japanese: 暴虐! シャボンディの支配者天竜人)	Yukihiko Nakao	Hitoshi Tanaka	March 1, 2009	—
After landing on the Sabaody Archipelago, the Straw Hats begin searching for a man Hatchan knows who can coat their ship so they can continue on to Fish-man Island. Usopp and Franky stay behind to make repairs to the ship and Sanji stays as well to guard the treasure for Nami. Hachi tells the Straw Hats that the World Nobles are also known as the Celestial Dragons and that they wear masks so that they don't breath the same air as the common people. He also tells them that Sabaody is crawling with famous pirates, bounty hunters, and slave traders. Luffy notices a wound on Hachi's head to which Hachi tells them not to mind it and also to treat Camie and himself like humans. Meanwhile Luffy, Brook, Chopper and Hachi run into a runaway slave who is begging for someone to take off his slave collar. He tries to take it off himself but then the collar explodes. The Celestial Dragons come to the scene and Hachi tells Luffy and the others to get on their knees. They start kicking and torturing the dead slave, and Luffy struggles to not interfere. Pappagu reveals the World Nobles to be the descendants of the creators of the World Government and harming them is an act of war.
392	11	"New Rivals Gather! The 11 Supernovas"; Transliteration: "Aratana Raibaru Shūketsu! Jūichinin no Chōshinsei" (Japanese: 新たなライバル集結! 11人の超新星)	Hiroyuki Satō	Hirohiko Kamisaka	March 8, 2009	—
Luffy and his group defeat some bounty hunters who were attempting to capture them. Later, they meet up with Hatchan's old friend, Shakki, while she was busy beating up two guys who didn't pay up. Shakki tells the gang to wait and resumes beating up the two guys in front of Chopper and the starfish, while they spewed out blood. She then throws them outside. In her bar where she informs Luffy that he and Zoro are part of the Eleven Supernovas, rookie pirates with over 100,000,000 berry bounties on their heads, consisting of: Eustass Kid, Killer, Jewelry Bonney, X Drake, Basil Hawkins, Urouge, Capone Bege, Scratchmen Apoo and Trafalgar Law. She also mentions her mysterious friend, the coating mechanic Silvers Rayleigh, who is stronger than all 11 Supernovas put together!
393	12	"The Target is Camie! The Looming Clutches of a Professional Kidnapper"; Transliteration: "Hyōteki wa Keimī!! Semaru Hitosarai-ya no Mashu" (Japanese: 標的はケイミー!! 迫る人攫い屋の魔手)	Tetsuya Endō	Yoshiyuki Suga	March 15, 2009	—
Luffy's group begins to look for Rayleigh and "searches" the islands local amusement park. There they spend most of the day enjoying themselves, even fulfilling Camie's dream of riding the Ferris wheel. However unbeknownst to them, a bounty hunter named Peterman is tailing them, having gotten info that Camie is a mermaid from the bounty hunters that Luffy's group previously encountered. Meanwhile, on another part of the island, Saint Charloss, another World Noble, shoots an injured man that doctors were trying to bring into a hospital simply because the man was in his way. Saint Charloss then proceeds to take the nurse who was with the injured man for his wife, shooting her fiancee when he objects. Zoro, who stumbles upon the scene, unintentionally angers Charloss which causes him to fire his gun. Zoro immediately dodges and goes to counterattack. However, Bonney stops the attack in order to ensure that an admiral will not come to the island. Back at the Sunny, Sanji, Usopp and Franky receive an urgent call from Chopper stating that Camie has been kidnapped and Luffy's group doesn't know where to look for her due to the size of the island. Sanji tells them to stand by, explaining that he will call the Flying Fish Riders.
394	13	"Rescue Camie! The Archipelago’s Lingering Dark History"; Transliteration: "Keimī o Sukue - Shotō ni Nokoru Ankoku no Rekishi" (Japanese: ケイミーを救え 諸島に残る暗黒の歴史)	Makoto Sonoda	Hitoshi Tanaka	March 29, 2009	—
Duval and his crew, now calling themselves the Rosy Life Riders, arrive on the archipelago and start gathering the Straw Hats up to bring them to the Human Auction House, where the kidnappers have brought Camie. Robin tells Nami why the Fishmen and Merfolk are not welcome on the island as in the past they had been discriminated against and classified as just fish. At the auction house itself, Saint Rosward and Saint Sharulia arrive complaining that Saint Charloss is late. The crews of Trafalgar Law and Eustass Kid, are already present. Backstage are Camie and the other human merchandise, including the coating mechanic, Silvers Rayleigh, former first mate of Gold Roger himself.
395	14	"Time Limit – The Human Auction Begins"; Transliteration: "Taimu Rimitto - Hyūman Ōkushon Kaimaku" (Japanese: タイムリミット 人間オークション開幕)	Yutaka Nakashima	Yoshiyuki Suga	April 5, 2009	—
The human auction finally begins, and it is only then that the Straw Hats discovered that their mermaid friend is being sold off at Grove 1. After rendezvousing there (save for Zoro, Luffy, Brook, and Robin), their initial plan to extract Camie is thwarted upon learning that the World Government and the Celestial Dragons are involved in the slave trade, so Nami decides that they'll buy Camie back in the auction itself. Meanwhile, the rest of the archipelago receives news that the World Government is going to execute the captured Portgas D. Ace, a move that could provoke a war with Whitebeard.
396	15	"The Fist Explodes! Destroy the Auction"; Transliteration: "Tekken Sakuretsu! Ōkushon o Buttsubuse" (Japanese: 鉄拳炸裂! オークションをぶっつぶせ)	Katsumi Tokoro	Hirohiko Kamisaka	April 12, 2009	—
The auction continues, but Saint Charloss arrives and ruins the Straw Hats' plan to buy Camie back by placing an exorbitant bid on her. The proceedings are then interrupted when Luffy and his Flying Fish crash into the auction house, but he is restrained from rushing the stage by Hatchan, who accidentally reveals his Fish-man nature in the process. While the nobility recoils in disgust, Charloss shoots him, gloating about obtaining a Fish-man slave. Luffy snaps and punches Charloss in the face.
397	16	"Major Panic! Desperate Struggle at the Auction House"; Transliteration: "Dai Panikku! Ōkushon Kaijō no Shitō" (Japanese: 大パニック! オークション会場の死闘)	Yoshihiro Ueda	Hitoshi Tanaka	April 19, 2009	—
After Luffy punches Charloss, the guards begin to attack the Straw Hats and most of the observers, except for Charloss' family and Kid and Law's crews, evacuate. The Straw Hats fight the guards as Robin, Brook and Usopp arrive to help, with Usopp accidentally knocking Rosward unconscious as he falls through the roof and work to save Camie. The Navy alerted to Luffy attacking Charloss and surround the auction house. An infuriated Shalria attempts to kill Camie, but is knocked out by a sudden burst of "Haki" from Rayleigh, who emerges from backstage and reveals himself to Luffy.
398	17	"Admiral Kizaru Takes Action! Sabaody Archipelago Thrown into Chaos"; Transliteration: "Taishō Kizaru Ugoku! Sōzen Shabondi Shotō" (Japanese: 大将黄猿動く! 騒然シャボンディ諸島)	Sumio Watanabe	Yoshiyuki Suga	April 26, 2009	—
News of the attack on the World Nobles reaches the pirates in the town, as well as the Navy Headquarters, where Kizaru decides to go to the island in order to deal with the situation. Donquixote Doflamingo, who owns the auction house, tells Disco that the Seven Warlords will be called to war against the Whitebeard Pirates. Rayleigh introduces himself to the Straw Hats, frees Camie from her collar and notes that he is the coating engineer that they have been looking for. Monkey D. Luffy, Kid and Law go out to fight the Navy, who are no match for their Devil Fruit abilities.
399	18	"Break Through the Siege! The Navy vs. the Three Captains"; Transliteration: "Hōim Ami o Toppaseyo! Kaigun VS Sannin no Senchō" (Japanese: 包囲網を突破せよ! 海軍VS三人の船長)	Yukihiko Nakao	Hirohiko Kamisaka	May 3, 2009	—
Luffy, Law and Kid's crews join the fight, defeat the rest of the Navy outside the auction house, promising to meet and fight in the New World. Luffy's crew escapes with the help of the Rosy Life Riders. A mysterious figure that appears to be Kuma intercepts Kid and Law, then begins attacking them with lasers.
400	19	"Roger and Rayleigh – the King of the Pirates and His Right Hand Man"; Transliteration: "Rojā to Reirī – Kaizoku Ō to sono Migiude" (Japanese: ロジャーとレイリー 海賊王とその右腕)	Katsumi Tokoro	Yoshiyuki Suga	May 10, 2009	—
Upon arriving back at Shakky's Bar, Rayleigh reveals to the Straw Hats that he was first mate to the legendary King of the Pirates Gold Roger and the truth to his crew's dismissal. Thus they leave soon after with a bit of Rayleigh's Vivrecard for each of them and he tells them to come back in three days when their ship will be ready. Meanwhile, Admiral Kizaru arrives at the Archipelago.
401	20	"No Escape!? Admiral Kizaru’s Light Speed Kick!!"; Transliteration: "Kaihi Fukanō!? Taishō Kizaru no Kōsoku no Keri" (Japanese: 回避不可能!? 大将黄猿の光速の蹴り)	Yutaka Nakashima	Hitoshi Tanaka	May 17, 2009	—
Admiral Kizaru appears in the Archipelago and demonstrates his mysterious light abilities before taking on the Supernova Basil Hawkins, while Urouge and Drake fight a Pacifista. Kid and Law continue their bout with another Pacifista while the Straw Hat Pirates come face to face with a third one. A shady figure with a giant broadaxe is seen at the end, waiting for a call.
402	21	"Overwhelming! The Navy’s Fighting Weapons, the Pacifistas"; Transliteration: "Attōteki! Kaigun no Sentō Heiki Pashifisuta" (Japanese: 圧倒的! 海軍の戦闘兵器パシフィスタ)	Tetsuya Endō	Yoshiyuki Suga	May 24, 2009	—
The Straw Hat Pirates fight against one of the Pacifistas, and while it does not have the real Kuma's Devil Fruit powers, it is still able to withstand their strongest attacks while firing devastating lasers at the crew. Elsewhere on the archipelago, Kizaru easily defeats Hawkins, Urouge, Drake and Apoo before Sentomaru contacts him. The situation for the Straw Hats grows even more desperate as Zoro suffers pain from his wounds.
403	22	"An Even Stronger Enemy Appears! The Battle Axe-Carrying Sentomaru"; Transliteration: "Saranaru Kyōteki Arawaru! Masakari Katsuida Sentōmaru" (Japanese: さらなる強敵現る! 鉞かついだ戦桃丸)	Yoshihiro Ueda	Yoshiyuki Suga	May 31, 2009	—
The Straw Hats combine their strongest attacks to defeat the Pacifista, but are exhausted after the battle. Sentomaru arrives with another Pacifista and Luffy attempts to escape, dividing the Straw Hats into three groups. Unfortunately, Sentomaru intercepts his group, the Pacifista cuts off Sanji's group and Kizaru attacks Zoro's group, knocking Zoro down and preparing to finish him off.
404	23	"Admiral Kizaru's Fierce Assault! The Straw Hats Face Certain Death!"; Transliteration: "Taishō Kizaru no Mōkō – Mugiwara Ichimi Zettaizetsumei!" (Japanese: 大将黄猿の猛攻 麦わら一味絶体絶命!)	Makoto Sonoda	Hirohiko Kamisaka	June 7, 2009	—
Usopp and Brook's attempts to attack Kizaru fail, but Rayleigh arrives, managing to block Kizaru's attack and hold him off. Luffy orders his crew to retreat, declaring the enemies impossible for them to defeat at this time, but Sentomaru and the other Pacifista bar their escape and even Chopper's Monster Point form is unable to turn the situation to their advantage. The real Kuma arrives and uses his Devil Fruit powers to make Zoro disappear.
405	24	"Eliminated Friends – The Final Day of the Straw Hat Crew"; Transliteration: "Kesareta Nakama-tachi – Mugiwara Ichimi Saigo no Hi" (Japanese: 消された仲間たち 麦わら一味最後の日)	Hiroaki Miyamoto	Hirohiko Kamisaka	June 14, 2009	—
Sentomaru reveals that Kuma has the ability to make people not desappearing but fly through the sky to far away places. Kuma uses his ability to make the other Pacifista and the rest of the Straw Hats fly, while Luffy struggles desperately to protect them and Rayleigh is occupied dealing with Kizaru. Kuma tells Rayleigh something that he is reluctant to believe before teleporting a despairing Luffy away while saying they'll never meet again, completely defeating the Straw Hats and flying to far away places.
Boss Luffy Historical Special
406	25	"Feudal Era Side Story – Boss Luffy Appears Again"; Transliteration: "Jidaigeki Tokubetsu Hen – Rufi-Oyabun Futatabi Kenzan" (Japanese: 時代劇特別編 ルフィ親分再び見参)	Tetsuya Endō	Hitoshi Tanaka	June 21, 2009	—
In an alternate universe set in Edo period Japan, the Mikoshi race is about to take place, the winner of which receives a million Berries, and Boss Luffy and his friends recruit Franky to build them a mikoshi. Meanwhile, Thriller LTD enters the race, and begins working to sabotage its competitors, including groups based on the Flying Fish Riders and Rolling Pirates. The crew meets up with Brook, who cannot remember anything other than his own name, and tries to stop Thriller LTD from interfering. They arrive to find their mikoshi destroyed, and Brook remembers that he was once part of Thriller LTD before trying to leave and being thrown in a river by Hogback, Perona and Absalom.
407	26	"Feudal Era Side Story – Defeat Thriller Company's Trap"; Transliteration: "Jidaigeki Tokubetsu Hen – Yabure! Surirā Shōkai no Wana" (Japanese: 時代劇特別編 破れ! スリラー商会の罠)	Naoyuki Itō	Hitoshi Tanaka	June 28, 2009	—
Robin reveals Brook's past to Luffy and his friends, and they decide to help him. Brook is captured by Thriller LTD, but Luffy and Zoro arrive to help him escape. The group rebuilds their mikoshi, which is modeled after the Thousand Sunny, and faces Thriller LTD's Oars-shaped mikoshi in the race. They win with the help of its special abilities, and Luffy sends Hogback, Perona and Absalom flying for disrupting the festival. Igaram confiscates the prize money to pay for the damage to the town, but allows them to see the treasure, which is a pair of panties that can grant wishes if a beautiful woman wears them. Brook suggests that Mao wear them and she punches him out, once again erasing his memory.

== Home media release ==
=== Japanese ===
Avex Mode (Japan, Region 2 DVD)
Volume		Episodes	Release date	Ref.
11thシーズン シャボンディ諸島篇	piece.01	382–385	January 7, 2011	
11thシーズン シャボンディ諸島篇	piece.02	386–389	January 7, 2011	
11thシーズン シャボンディ諸島篇	piece.03	390–393	February 2, 2011	
11thシーズン シャボンディ諸島篇	piece.04	394–397	February 2, 2011	
11thシーズン シャボンディ諸島篇	piece.05	398–401	March 2, 2011	
11thシーズン シャボンディ諸島篇	piece.06	402–405	March 2, 2011	
ワンピース時代劇スペシャル『麦わらのルフィ親分捕物帖3』		406–407	October 26, 2012	
ONE PIECE Log Collection	“SHABODY”	384–393	July 26, 2013	
ONE PIECE Log Collection	“ROOKIES”	394–405	August 23, 2013	

=== English ===
In North America, the season was recategorized as the end of "Season Six" and the beginning of "Season Seven" for its DVD release by Funimation Entertainment. The Australian Season sets were renamed Collection 31 though 33.

Funimation Entertainment (USA, Region 1), Manga Entertainment (UK, Region 2), Madman Entertainment (Australia, Region 4)
Volume		Episodes	Release date			ISBN	Ref.
Volume		Episodes	USA	UK	Australia	ISBN	Ref.
Season Six	Voyage Four	373–384	April 7, 2015	N/A	June 10, 2015	ISBN N/A	
Season Seven	Voyage One	385–396	July 14, 2015	N/A	September 16, 2015	ISBN N/A	
Season Seven	Voyage Two	397–409	September 1, 2015	N/A	November 18, 2015	ISBN N/A	
Collections	Collection 16	373–396	June 28, 2016	March 27, 2017	N/A	ISBN N/A	
Collections	Collection 17	397–421	October 11, 2016	June 25, 2018	N/A	ISBN N/A	
Treasure Chest Collection	Four	300–396	N/A		December 7, 2016	ISBN N/A	
Treasure Chest Collection	Five	397–491	N/A		September 6, 2017	ISBN N/A	
Voyage Collection	Eight	349–396	N/A		March 7, 2018	ISBN N/A	
Voyage Collection	Nine	397–445	N/A		May 9, 2018	ISBN N/A	
