= One Piece season 13 =

Season of television series

One Piece
- Season 13; Impel Down
- The cover of the first DVD compilation released by Avex Mode of the thirteenth season.
- No. of episodes: 35

Release
- Original network: Fuji Television
- Original release: October 18, 2009 – June 20, 2010

Season chronology
- ← Previous; Season 12 Next → Season 14

The thirteenth season of the One Piece anime series titled "Impel Down" (インペルダウン, Inperu Daun), was produced by Toei Animation, and directed by Hiroaki Miyamoto based on Eiichiro Oda's manga by the same name. It deals with the imprisonment of Monkey D. Luffy's adoptive older brother Portgas D. Ace and Luffy's attempt with Boa Hancock's help to infiltrate the great prison Impel Down to save him. Luffy meets several old enemies prisoners from his past in this arc, including Buggy the Clown, Mr. 2 (Bon Clay), and Mr. 3. There is also a 4 episode arc set outside the current continuity titled "A Gold Lion's Ambition" (金獅子の野望 Kinjishi no Yabō), which serves as a prologue to the concurrently released One Piece Film: Strong World. This arc features Luffy and his crew's run-in with a group of pirates hired by Shiki, the film's main antagonist. Following this arc, the Impel Down story line continues where it had left off.

The season began broadcasting on Fuji Television on October 18, 2009, and ended on June 20, 2010, totaling 35 episodes. This season's beginning was announced in the One Piece Movie 10 Guide Book, "One Piece-Pia". The season was released through DVD compilations; the first two were released on June 1, 2011. The last two DVD compilations were released on September 6, 2011.

The season used two pieces of theme music. The first opening theme, titled "Share the World" by TVXQ continues to be used for the beginning of the season. The second opening theme, starting from episode 426 onwards, is "Kaze o Sagashite" (風をさがして; lit. 'Search for the Wind') performed by Mari Yaguchi with the Straw Hats.

== Episodes ==
No. overall	No. in season	Title	Directed by	Written by	Original release date
Impel Down
422	1	"A Deadly Infiltration! The Underwater Prison Impel Down!"; Transliteration: "Kesshi no Sennyū! Kaitei Kangoku Inperu Daun" (Japanese: 決死の潜入! 海底監獄インペルダウン)	Yoshihiro Ueda	Yoshiyuki Suga	October 18, 2009
Garp tells Ace that Luffy now knows about his parentage and that he had hoped Ace and Luffy would become marines. Ace says it is impossible because both he and Luffy are descendants of criminals, and that as he does not remember or care for his father, he took on his mother's name and considers Whitebeard his only father. The Buggy Pirates sail towards Impel Down, hoping to free the captured Buggy. Alvida refuses to risk herself for Buggy, suggesting that Impel Down is impossible to break into, and the rest of the crew gives up after she says she will take the ship for herself if they go to save him. Hancock reaches Impel Down with Luffy, where she meets with Hannyabal, the ambitious vice-warden of the prison, and is to be subjected to a strip search before being granted entry.
423	2	"A Reunion in Hell?! The Man Who Ate the Chop-Chop Fruit!"; Transliteration: "Jigoku de Saikai!? Bara Bara no Mi no Nōryokusha!" (Japanese: 地獄で再会!? バラバラの実の実力者!)	Directed by : Yutaka Nakashima; Storyboarded by : Naoyuki Itō	Hitoshi Tanaka	October 25, 2009
Hancock petrifies Domino and the camera snail to allow Luffy to sneak out before submitting to the search. She boards the elevator to Warden Magellan on Level 4 while hearing about the different levels of the prison. Luffy sneaks into Level 1 while Buggy is in the middle of breaking out of his cell, having concealed his Devil Fruit ability. Buggy alerts some guards and triggers some traps during his escape, but Luffy manages to evade them and hears a rumor that Ace is on Level 5. Buggy runs by, pursued by the powerful Blugori, and after some bickering between him and Luffy, they decide to team up to fight off the enemies.
424	3	"Break Through the Crimson Hell! Buggy's Chaos-Inducing Plan!"; Transliteration: "Yabure! Guren Jigoku – Bagī no Dohade Daisakusen" (Japanese: 破れ! 紅蓮地獄 バギーのド派手大作戦)	Tetsuya Endō	Hitoshi Tanaka	November 1, 2009
Luffy easily defeats the Blugori while Buggy is unable to defeat even one. Buggy reveals his past association with Ace and the circumstances behind his capture, and agrees to work with Luffy in exchange for the armlet he got at Thriller Bark, which is a clue to Captain John's treasure hoard. Buggy and Luffy reach the first level of Impel Down, known as the Crimson Hell, where prisoners are forced to run through a forest with spikes for grass and spiked trees. Buggy's Chop Chop fruit powers enable him to carry Luffy over the spikes, but while he plans on abandoning Luffy there, he accidentally falls along with Luffy to the second level, the Floor of Wild Beasts From Hell, where Mr. 3 is imprisoned.
425	4	"The Strongest Man in the Prison! Poison Man Magellan Appears!"; Transliteration: "Kangoku Saikyō no Otoko! Doku Ningen Mazeran Tōjō" (Japanese: 監獄最強の男! 毒人間マゼラン登場)	Sumio Watanabe	Yoshiyuki Suga	November 8, 2009
Luffy and Buggy find themselves in the Floor of Wild Beasts from Hell and fight the monsters there. Luffy defeats the powerful Basilisk with a single punch in Third Gear, destroying a guard station in the process and alerting the prison to his identity. Hancock meets with Magellan, the warden of the prison who ate the Venom Venom Fruit, and whose breath is poisonous. Buggy manages to free some prisoners, hoping to start a riot and escape in the confusion, but the prisoners return to their cells, terrified of the "boss" of the level. Luffy and Buggy encounter Mr. 3, who offers to help them get down to the third level. At Marine Headquarters, Sengoku is surprised that Kuma failed to finish off Luffy and that Luffy infiltrated Impel Down, but is confident that he will be captured. He then recalls the one man who escaped from Impel Down, Golden Lion Shiki.
Little East Blue
426	5	"A Special Presentation Related to the Movie! A Gold Lion's Ambition on the Move!"; Transliteration: "Eiga Rendō Supesharu – Ugokidasu Kinjishi no Yabō" (Japanese: 映画連動特別編 動き出す金獅子の野望)	Hiroaki Miyamoto	Hirohiko Kamisaka	November 15, 2009
In a flashback, it is revealed that 20 years ago, a pirate named "Gold Lion" Shiki cut off his legs and escaped from Impel Down. A few days before the start of the movie, Gold Lion Shiki contacts the Amigo Pirates, a crew of pirates led by a man named Largo, offering to make them the 51st crew under his command if they fulfill a certain request. Meanwhile Luffy, Usopp, Chopper and Brook try to catch a large fish, but it ends up getting eaten by a large beetle named "Boss". Luffy starts fighting the beetle with the intention of making it part of his crew, but it flies toward an island with him, Zoro, Sanji and Usopp in tow. Yoko, a girl wearing a Marine coat appears, attacking Luffy over how he treated Boss, and some people emerge from the island and reveal that they have been living while running from all threats, because the Marines do not protect them. Yoko's father was a Marine who died defending them five years ago, and she first met Boss three years after his death. They show the four Straw Hats their village, which strongly resembles East Blue to the point of having replicas of several prominent buildings. The villagers ask Luffy to bring Nami to the village, and as Nami heads to the village on the modified Waver, Largo's pirates head to the island to fulfill Shiki's request to get the beetle that left his hideout.
427	6	"A Special Presentation Related to the Movie! Little East Blue in Danger!"; Transliteration: "Eiga Rendō Supesharu – Nerawareta Ritoru Īsuto Burū" (Japanese: 映画連動特別編 狙われた小さな東の海)	Tetsuya Endō	Hirohiko Kamisaka	November 22, 2009
The Straw Hats meet with people in places that remind them of where they came from, and Yoko becomes irritated at how easily they are bonding. The Amigo Pirates decide to head ashore, but because Largo is taking a nap, Colt leads them. Nami meets with the "Orenami" fan club, who leads her through a maze and shows her a naked statue of her, which offends her. She sees Yoko, and finds that Yoko reminds her of herself when she first met Luffy. While the Straw Hats are at a party, the Amigo pirates attack, destroying much of the village, and demand the beetle. Luffy easily defeats Colt and his men with Zoro and Sanji's help, but Largo traps him in a needled net.
428	7	"A Special Presentation Related to the Movie! The Fierce Onslaught of the Amigo Pirates!"; Transliteration: "Eiga Rendō Supesharu – Amīgo Kaizoku-dan no Mōkō" (Japanese: 映画連動特別編 アミーゴ海賊団の猛攻)	Directed by : Katsumi Tokoro; Storyboarded by : Kenji Yokoyama	Hirohiko Kamisaka	November 29, 2009
The rest of the Straw Hats hear the fighting on the island and decide to head over. Zoro and Sanji attempt to attack Largo, who uses his Net Net Fruit powers to create nets out of materials that he eats and captures the two of them. Largo and Colt threaten to exterminate the town if they do not get the beetle, and Boss comes out to fight them, but is quickly defeated. Boss decides to sacrifice himself to save the village, despite Yoko's objections, but Luffy tears open the net and punches Boss, saying that he wants to fight with him again. Boss sheds his skin and is able to fly long enough to burn Luffy, Zoro and Sanji's nets. The Straw Hats and the villagers prepare to fight the Amigo Pirates.
429	8	"A Special Presentation Related to the Movie! The Battle is on! - Luffy vs. Largo"; Transliteration: "Eiga Rendō Supesharu – Kessen! Rufi VS Rarugo" (Japanese: 映画連動特別編 決戦! ルフィVSラルゴ)	Naoyuki Itō	Hirohiko Kamisaka	December 6, 2009
After escaping from the net, Luffy knocks Largo far away and goes off to fight him. Nami pretends to evacuate the villagers, but takes them through other tunnels to surprise the Amigo pirates while they are fighting Zoro and Sanji. Luffy fights Largo, but becomes trapped when he turns his entire body into a net. Luffy uses Third Gear to inflate and burst the net before defeating Largo with Gigant Pistol, destroying his ship in the process. Boss saves Luffy from falling into the sea and then starts fighting him in a rematch that lasts for hours. Yoko and Nami discuss their respective pasts, before Nami brings the Straw Hats together and sets sail from the island. It is revealed that Boss was a specially created insect that had escaped from Shiki, and that he plans on using an army of similar creatures to wage war on the world.
Impel Down
430	9	"A Warlord in Prison! Jimbei the First Son of the Sea!"; Transliteration: "Toraware no Ōka Shichibukai! Kaikyō no Jinbē" (Japanese: 囚われの王下七武海! 海侠のジンベエ)	Yoshihiro Ueda	Yoshiyuki Suga	December 13, 2009
Ace speaks with Jimbei, a fishman who is one of the Seven Warlords of the Sea, in his cell, and learns that Jimbei had wanted to stop the war between Whitebeard's pirates and the Marines because Whitebeard protects Fishman island from the pirates who pass through it. Several other pirates on the level, including Crocodile, want Whitebeard dead for thwarting their ambitions. On Level 2, Luffy, Buggy and Mr. 3 run from the beasts before encountering the Sphinx, which is the boss of the level. Mr. 3 plots to escape with Buggy to a higher level while using Luffy as bait, but his plans fail. The Sphinx destroys the floor while attacking wax duplicates of Mr. 3, causing it, Luffy, Buggy and Mr. 3 to fall to Level 3.
431	10	"Chief Jailer Saldeath's Trap! Level 3 – Starvation Hell!"; Transliteration: "Rōbanchō Sarudesu no Wana – Reberu Surī Kiga Jigoku" (Japanese: 牢番長サルデスの罠 LV.3飢餓地獄)	Directed by : Sumio Watanabe; Storyboarded by : Takahiro Imamura	Hitoshi Tanaka	December 20, 2009
With the Sphinx having fallen to the next level, a riot breaks out on Level 2 as the prisoners leave their cells. Sengoku is outraged at Luffy's break-in, noting that no one has escaped Impel Down since Gold Lion Shiki did 20 years ago. Luffy, Buggy and Mr. 3 wander around the third level, a hot desert in which prisoners do not receive food or water, until they are caught in a seastone net triggered by Saldeath, commander of the guards. The sphinx struggles and breaks the net, and while Buggy and Mr. 3 plan on abandoning Luffy while he fights the guards, they are unable to leave the level. Meanwhile, Hancock gets closer to where Ace is being held, and Mr. 2 is shown to be imprisoned in Level 3.
432	11	"The Unleashed Swan! A Reunion with Bon Clay!"; Transliteration: "Tokihanatareta Suwan! Saikai! Bon Kurē" (Japanese: 解き放たれた白鳥! 再会! ボン・クレー)	Yutaka Nakashima	Hirohiko Kamisaka	December 27, 2009
Buggy and Mr. 3 come across Mr. 2's cell, and release him, telling him Luffy is in the prison, working his way towards level 5. Meanwhile, the navy arrives at Impel Down to help capture Luffy. The captain of the guards, Sadie, order them to guard the outside of the prison, as the Impel Down guards are perfectly capable of catching Luffy themselves. Boa Hancock has finally made it to Ace's cell, and manages to inform him Luffy is coming to his rescue while Magellan and the others are occupied with other prisoners acting up. As Luffy closes in on the stairs leading to level 4, he is attacked by Saldeath and his guards, but gets unexpected help from Mr. 2, who has decided to help him in his quest.
433	12	"Warden Magellan's Strategy! Straw Hat Entrapment Completed!"; Transliteration: "Shochō Mazeran Ugoku – Kansei! Mugiwara Hōimō" (Japanese: 署長マゼラン動く 完成! 麦わら包囲網)	Tetsuya Endō	Hirohiko Kamisaka	January 10, 2010
Luffy and Mr. 2 fight their way through Level 3, eventually encountering the Minotaurus, and Luffy defeats it with Jet Bazooka. Luffy notices that the fourth level is extremely hot, and that he must jump down without landing in the fire or boiling blood. He learns that Mr. 2 is looking for the legendary transvestite Emporio Ivankov, who is "queen" of Kamabakka Island. The Minotaurus chases Buggy and Mr. 3 to Luffy and Mr. 2, and the four defeat it. Meanwhile, Magellan orders all his forces to Level 4 in order to kill Luffy.
434	13	"All Forces Have Gathered! The Battle on Level 4 – The Burning Heat Hell!"; Transliteration: "Zensenryoku shūketsu! Reberu Fō – Shōnetsu Jigoku no Kessen" (Japanese: 全戦力集結！ LV4·焦熱地獄の決戦)	Katsumi Tokoro	Hitoshi Tanaka	January 17, 2010
After the Minotaurus' defeat, the floor gives way from the attacks Luffy and his companions used to defeat it, and they fall into Level 4. As Hancock leaves Impel Down, Momonga hears about Red-Haired Shanks fighting Kaido in the New World to prevent him from attacking Whitebeard. Magellan orders Sadie and the rest of the Demon Guards to guard the stairway to Level 5 while Hannyabal gets assigned to Level 3. Luffy and the others land in Level 4, managing to avoid being boiled in the sea of blood. Luffy and Mr. 2 fight their way through the guards in search of food until Magellan intercepts them.
435	14	"Mighty Magellan! Bon Clay Bugs Out!"; Transliteration: "Mazeran Tsuyoshi! Bon Kurē Tekizen Tōbō" (Japanese: マゼラン強し! ボン・クレー敵前逃亡)	Takahiro Imamura	Yoshiyuki Suga	January 24, 2010
Luffy begins fighting Magellan despite Bon Clay's warnings to flee, and finds that he is unable to go on the offensive because of Magellan's poisonous body and long-range poison attacks. Bon Clay considers helping him, but knows he would die if he even attempted to do so, and is unable to help, runs away from the battle sorrowfully. Mr. 3 and Buggy try to escape to higher levels, and while Hannyabal is willing to let them past to get Magellan in trouble, they do not believe him thinking it's a trap, and attack him and his guards. Luffy decides to attack even if it means sacrifice himself to attack Magellan. Luffy enters Gear Third and uses Haki on him, injuring Magellan and getting poisoned in the process.
436	15	"The Showdown Has Come! Luffy's Desperate Last Attack!"; Transliteration: "Shiyū Kessu! Sutemi no Rufi Saigo no Ichigeki" (Japanese: 雌雄決す! 捨て身のルフィ最後の一撃)	Hiroaki Miyamoto	Hitoshi Tanaka	January 31, 2010
Hannyabal quickly defeats Buggy and Mr. 3. Luffy becomes weaker as a result of absorbing Magellan's poison, and is no longer able to fight effectively. Unwilling to give up, he continues to press on the attack, repeatedly taking in Magellan's poison and finally being defeated and lying on the ground, fatally poisoned.
437	16	"For His Friend! Bon Clay Goes to the Deadly Rescue!"; Transliteration: "Dachi dakara – Bon Kurē Kesshi no Kyūshutsugyō" (Japanese: 友達だから ボン・クレー決死の救出行)	Yoshihiro Ueda	Yoshiyuki Suga	February 7, 2010
After Luffy's defeat, Magellan has him imprisoned in Level 5 until the poison kills him. Mr. 2, having taken Hannyabal's appearance, resolves to rescue Luffy in order to make up for abandoning him in the fight with Magellan, but learns that no antidotes can save him now. Mr. 2 then decides to seek out Emporio Ivankov, Queen of Kamabakka Kingdom, to heal Luffy, but learns that he has vanished in one of the "demoning away" incidents. Mr. 2 heads to Level 5 with Buggy and Mr. 3, who quickly abandon him when the Wolf Unit attack. Luffy remains determined to rescue Ace despite his condition, and Mr. 2 arrives at his cell to save him.
438	17	"A Paradise in Hell! Impel Down – Level 5.5!"; Transliteration: "Jigoku ni Rakuen! Inperu Daun Reberu Go ten Go" (Japanese: 地獄に楽園! インペルダウン LV5.5)	Yoshihiro Ueda	Hirohiko Kamisaka	February 14, 2010
Mr. 2 apologizes for abandoning Luffy and searches for Ivankov. Along the way, he is attacked by Army Wolves, but Luffy disables them with his Haki and a mysterious stranger named Inazuma saves the two of them. Elsewhere, Buggy and Mr. 3 attempt to escape from Level 5, Saldeath suppresses the riot on Level 2, Sadi searches for Mr. 2 on Level 3, Warden Magellan is in the bathroom with diarrhea, and Hannyabal is tied up in a storage room, having been tricked and taken by surprise by Mr. 2. Mr. 2 wakes up in "Level 5.5," a crossdressers' paradise where all the prisoners who have been "demoned away" and Emporio Ivankov are.
439	18	"Luffy's Treatment Begins! Iva's Miraculous Power!"; Transliteration: "Rufi Chiryō Kaishi! Iwa-san Kiseki no Chikara" (Japanese: ルフィ治療開始! イワさん奇跡の能力)	Tetsuya Endō	Hirohiko Kamisaka	February 21, 2010
Emporio Ivankov displays some of his powers, including stopping a vengeful pirate's cannon shot merely by winking and then turning him into a woman. Ivankov tells Bon Clay that he saved him because Luffy begged him to, and he is healing Luffy with his hormone-based powers, which only work on those with extraordinary will to live. Unfortunately, the treatment takes 10 years off of Luffy's lifespan, leaves him in agonizing pain, and will last over two days, with Ace's execution coming in only 16 hours.
440	19	"Believe in Miracles! Bon Clay's Cries From the Heart!"; Transliteration: "Kiseki o Shinjite! Bon Kurē Tamashii no Seien" (Japanese: 奇跡を信じて! ボン・クレー魂の声援)	Yutaka Nakashima	Yoshiyuki Suga	February 28, 2010
Ivankov tells Bon Clay that he has eaten the Horm-Horm Fruit, which enables him to manipulate people's hormones for various purposes, and that New Kama Land lies between Level 5 and Level 6. He says that Level 6 truly exists and is a place where prisoners who are incredibly dangerous or harmful to the World Government's reputation, such as former head warden Shiryu, are kept. Despite the long time for treatment, and low risk of survival, Bon Clay keeps on cheering for Luffy until his voice gives out, with the other New Kamas joining in. Meanwhile, Ace worries about Luffy always taking risks for his sake while the guards discover Luffy's disappearance and prepare to transport Ace to his execution. Eventually, Luffy's screams stop and he, having completed his treatment after less than a day, eats a large amount of food and declares that he has recovered.
441	20	"Luffy Back In Action! Iva Begins the Breakout Plan!"; Transliteration: "Rufi Fukkatsu! Iwa-san Datsugoku Keikaku Shidō!!" (Japanese: ルフィ復活! イワさん脱獄計画始動!!)	Katsumi Tokoro	Hitoshi Tanaka	March 7, 2010
After Luffy emerges from the treatment, Ivankov learns that he is Dragon's son and reveals himself as one of Dragon's commanders in the revolutionary army. Despite being exhausted and needing several days to rest, Luffy is given a special hormone treatment that enables him to ignore his fatigue for a day, and he, Ivankov and Inazuma fight their way down to Level 6. Meanwhile, Buggy and Mr. 3 make their way to Level 4, Hannyabal makes arrangements to capture the intruders, and Magellan arrives at Ace's cell to hand him over to the Marines, who will take him to the execution site at Marineford.
442	21	"Ace's Convoy Begins! Battle on the Lowest Floor – Level 6!"; Transliteration: "Ēsu Gosō Kaishi – Saikasō Reberu Shikkusu Kōbō" (Japanese: エース護送開始 最下層LV6の攻防!)	Sumio Watanabe	Hitoshi Tanaka	March 14, 2010
Luffy, Ivankov and Inazuma reach Level 6 after Ace has been taken away, and are nearly caught in a gas trap until Inazuma uses his Snip-Snip powers in order to cut up the floor and seal off the gas. Ace learns of Luffy's coming and is greatly disturbed by the news. Luffy refuses to give up despite the dangers awaiting him, and Crocodile, who is imprisoned on the level, offers Luffy a way of getting off the floor.
443	22	"The Ultimate Team Has Formed! Shaking Impel Down!"; Transliteration: "Saikyō Chīmu Kessei – Shinkan! Inperudaun" (Japanese: 最強チーム結成 震撼! インペルダウン)	Tetsuya Endō	Yoshiyuki Suga	March 21, 2010
Luffy is reluctant to free Crocodile, but Ivankov offers to keep him in line by blackmailing him with a weakness he knows about. Jimbei joins in order to stop the war between Whitebeard and the Marines, and the group of five leaves through the ceiling. They meet with Bon Clay and the New Kamas, and fight the guards on Level 4, where Crocodile frees and recruits Mr. 1. As the guards are defeated, Hannyabal, not wanting to be disgraced, goes down to fight the prisoners. Elsewhere, Ace is being transported by ship to the Gate of Justice, and Buggy and Mr. 3 have reached Level 2.
444	23	"Even More Chaos! Here Comes Blackbeard Teach!"; Transliteration: "Saranaru Konran! Kurohige Tīchi Shūrai!" (Japanese: さらなる混乱! 黒ひげ・ティーチ襲来!)	Takahiro Imamura	Hirohiko Kamisaka	March 28, 2010
While Luffy and his allies continue fighting on Level 4, Buggy and Mr. 3 reach Level 2 and release the prisoners there to cause a riot to cover their escape. Meanwhile, Blackbeard arrives at the prison and begins attacking the guards to force his way in. Hannyabal, en route to Level 4, is overwhelmed by these developments until Magellan reveals that he has suppressed the riot on Level 2 and is releasing Shiryu to deal with Blackbeard. Shiryu, immediately after being released and given his sword, kills all the guards sent to release him.
445	24	"The Dangerous Encounter! Blackbeard and Shiryu of the Rain!"; Transliteration: "Kiken na Deai! Kurohige to Ame no Shiryū" (Japanese: 危険な出会い！黒ひげと雨のシリュウ)	Yoshihiro Ueda	Yoshiyuki Suga	April 4, 2010
The Demon Guards arrive and overpower many of the prisoners, but Luffy, Jimbei and Crocodile defeat them in a single attack each. Buggy and Mr. 3 are trapped on Level 2 by a barrier made from Magellan's poison. On Level 1, Shiryu encounters Blackbeard, who is forcing his way into the prison, and after a conversation, Blackbeard proceeds onward. Hannyabal is ordered to hold off the prisoners until Magellan reaches Level 4. Sadie attacks the prisoners but Ivankov transforms into a woman to fight with her and allow Luffy to proceed. Luffy then encounters Hannyabal, who arrives prepared to fight him.
446	25	"Refusal to be Defeated! Serious Hannyabal"; Transliteration: "Iji demo Taorenu! Honki no Hannyabaru" (Japanese: 意地でも倒れぬ！本気のハンニャバル)	Yutaka Nakashima	Hitoshi Tanaka	April 11, 2010
Hannyabal fights against Luffy, but is outmatched against his Gear Second ability. Meanwhile, Blackbeard uses his powers to make Magellan's poison barrier disappear, freeing Buggy and his men, while Magellan arrives on Level 4. Hannyabal, despite being badly beaten, is determined to stop Luffy for the future of the world, but Blackbeard launches a surprise attack that knocks out him and his guards. Blackbeard tells Luffy that he had planned to capture him to secure a place among the Seven Warlords of the Sea, but after capturing Ace, partly as a result of him refusing to back down after hearing about his plans for Luffy, he no longer needed to do so. Luffy, enraged, strikes Blackbeard with Jet Pistol.
447	26	"Jet Pistol of Anger! Luffy vs. Blackbeard!"; Transliteration: "Ikari no Jetto Pisutoru – Rufi vs Kurohige" (Japanese: 怒りのJETピストル ルフィvs黒ヒゲ)	Makoto Sonoda	Yoshiyuki Suga	April 18, 2010
After Luffy punches Blackbeard, Blackbeard retaliates by slamming him into the ground, injuring him by nullifying his rubber powers. Jimbei convinces Luffy that he cannot afford to waste time fighting Blackbeard when he needs to hurry and save Ace. Crocodile questions why Blackbeard would attack the prison when doing so would mean giving up his Warlord title, but Blackbeard reveals that it is part of a larger plan. As Magellan approaches the prisoners, Luffy easily defeats the revived Minotaurus, while Ivankov defeats Sadie and ties her up with her whip. Buggy and Mr. 3 reach Level 1 with the prisoners following them. Magellan poisons Blackbeard and his crew before proceeding on to stop Luffy from escaping.
448	27	"Stop Magellan! Ivan-san's Esoteric Technique Explodes!"; Transliteration: "Mazeran o Tomero! Iwa-san Ōgi Sakuretsu" (Japanese: マゼランを止めろ！イワさん奥義炸裂)	Tetsuya Endō	Yoshiyuki Suga	April 25, 2010
As Luffy and the escaping prisoners pass through Level 3, Magellan catches up with them. Ivankov and Inazuma stay behind to stall him, but both of them are defeated. Luffy and Jimbei plan to steal a Marine battleship to reach Marineford. Luffy's group reaches Level 1, meeting the prisoners from Levels 1 and 2 who are following Buggy and Mr 3., and defeating the Demon Guards when they attack again, but Magellan manages to reach them again.
449	28	"Magellan's Tricky Move! A Foiled Escape Plan!"; Transliteration: "Mazeran no Kisaku! Habamareta Datsugoku Sakusen" (Japanese: マゼランの奇策！はばまれた脱獄計画)	Hiroyuki Satō	Hitoshi Tanaka	May 2, 2010
Luffy becomes enraged after learning about Magellan defeating Ivankov and Inazuma, but Mr. 2 and Jimbei persuade him that escaping takes priority. Magellan initiates a plan to move the Marine ships away from Impel Down, trapping the escapees in the prison. Mr. 3 blocks Magellan's poison with his wax, giving Luffy the idea to have him coat his fists and feet with wax so that he can hit Magellan without being poisoned. Jimbei finds a way to reach the ships by floating Buggy, Crocodile and Mr. 1 on a door and creating a sea current to launch it onto a battleship.
450	29	"The Escapee Team in Trouble! The Forbidden Move: Venom Demon!"; Transliteration: "Datsugoku Chīmu Zettaizetsumei – Kinjite 'Benomu Dēmon'" (Japanese: 脱獄チーム絶体絶命 禁じ手"毒の巨兵")	Katsumi Tokoro	Hirohiko Kamisaka	May 9, 2010
Magellan uses a move known as "Venom Demon" that corrodes anything it touches, rendering even Mr. 3's wax ineffective and forcing Luffy and Mr. 3 to retreat. Mr. 1 and Crocodile manage to capture a battleship, but are unable to move it back to the prison quickly enough, forcing the escapees to come up with an alternative plan. Ivankov recovers from the poison and bursts through the floor to reach Luffy. Luffy has Mr. 3 create a large wall of wax that, despite being unable to permanently block Magellan's poison, enables him to push Magellan back with Giant Stamp, and Ivankov uses a Death Wink to launch the prisoners into the ocean, where Jimbei has called whale sharks to carry them to the ship.
451	30	"Come, Final Miracle! Break Through the Gate of Justice!"; Transliteration: "Okose Saigo no Kiseki – Seigi no Mon o Toppaseyo" (Japanese: 起こせ最後の奇跡 正義の門を突破せよ)	Takahiro Imamura	Yoshiyuki Suga	May 16, 2010
Luffy and the rest of the prisoners make it onto the ship with the help of the whale sharks, but the Gates of Justice are still closed and the ship is under attack by the rest of the Marine ships, and Magellan plans on chasing down the escaping prisoners. Mr. 2 impersonates Magellan and manages to order that the gates be opened long enough to allow the prisoners' ship to escape, then immediately closed. Luffy is upset to hear of Mr. 2's staying behind, but comes to accept that there is no other choice, and thanks him over a miniature Transponder Snail. Mr. 2 stays behind to fight Magellan after he realizes what has happened as the other prisoners mourn his loss after passing through the Gates of Justice.
452	31	"To the Navy Headquarters! Off to Rescue Ace!"; Transliteration: "Mezase Kaigun Honbu – Ēsu Kyūshutsu e no Funade" (Japanese: 目指せ海軍本部 エース救出への船出!)	Yoshihiro Ueda	Hitoshi Tanaka	May 23, 2010
Shiryu saves Blackbeard and his crew by giving them antidotes to Magellan's poison before taking the opportunity to join with them. The prisoners celebrate their escape, but some, such as Buggy, are upset to learn from a Marine officer calling on a Transponder Snail that they are on their way to Marine Headquarters, and that the Gates of Justice to Marine Headquarters will not open for pirates. During the conversation, the officer reveals Buggy's past in the Roger Pirates and connections to Shanks, causing the prisoners to rally behind him. While some of the escapees are concerned that Buggy will start a mutiny, Buggy manages to convince the prisoners to go with them to Marine Headquarters in the hopes of defeating Whitebeard and standing on top of the pirate world. Meanwhile, the ship carrying Ace reaches Marine Headquarters.
Straw Hat's Separation Serial
453	32	"The Friends' Whereabouts! The Weatheria Report and the Cyborg Animals!"; Transliteration: "Nakama-tachi no Yukue – Wezaria Ripōto to Saibōgu Animaru" (Japanese: 仲間達の行方 空島リポートと改造動物)	Directed by : Aya Komaki; Storyboarded by : Tetsuya Endō	Hitoshi Tanaka	May 30, 2010
As Luffy's ship heads to Marine Headquarters, the scene shifts to a point some time in the past. Nami is still on Weather Island, which slowly heads toward the Sabaody archipelago at a pace determined by the winds. She sees the old man demonstrate his ability to summon large rains and store thunderstorms in soap bubbles. Meanwhile, Franky is still acting like a gentleman under the effects of the tea, and the boy with him wonders when cola will arrive to return him to normal. Franky is attacked by several cyborgs in the forest, causing the tea in him to bubble over and restoring his usual personality, which enables him to defeat the cyborgs with ease. Franky learns that Dr. Vegapunk, who modified Kuma, made the cyborgs, and reaches a house with Vegapunk's name on it, triggering an alarm as he goes in.
454	33	"The Friends' Whereabouts! The Chick of a Giant Bird and a Pink Showdown!"; Transliteration: "Nakama-tachi no Yukue – Kyochō no Hina to Momoiro no Taiketsu" (Japanese: 仲間達の行方 巨鳥のヒナと桃色の対決)	Yutaka Nakashima	Yoshiyuki Suga	June 6, 2010
Sanji desperately tries to escape the crossdressers of Kamabakka Kingdom, until he eventually encounters Caroline, the "queen" stand-in for Ivankov. He challenges Caroline to a duel to get off the island, but is unable to land a hit due to wanting to protect his modesty, and is eventually induced to start crossdressing. Meanwhile, Chopper cares for an injured bird chick, hoping that she can take him to the Sabaody Archipelago when she can fly. Humans corner Chopper and the chick on a cliff, hoping to eat them, until the bird's mother rescues Chopper by pushing him off a cliff and saves her child. Chopper is grateful, but then realizes he has no idea when the bird will be able to fly.
455	34	"The Friends' Whereabouts! Revolutionaries and the Gorging Forest's Trap"; Transliteration: "Nakama-tachi no Yukue – Kakumeigun to Bōshoku no Mori no Wana!" (Japanese: 仲間達の行方 革命軍と暴食の森の罠!)	Gō Koga	Hirohiko Kamisaka	June 13, 2010
Robin is imprisoned in a tower on Tequila Wolf and interrogated for information on the whereabouts of the Straw Hats, but her captors keep her true identity a secret. Soran meets with the woman who betrayed Robin, who regrets what she did to survive, and sets out to thank Robin. Some revolutionaries start to rise up and release Robin from her cell, allowing her to defeat some guards and join them to save the prisoners. Meanwhile, on Bowin Island, Usopp is constantly being attacked by animals and plants, as he is the weakest life form on the island, and Hercules tells him to eat in order to get stronger. Not hearing his advice to also work out, he eats as much as he can, and barely avoids being eaten by the island itself when the ground tilts and drops many fat animals into a strange mouth-like hole.
456	35	"The Friends' Whereabouts! A Huge Tomb and the Panty Debt!"; Transliteration: "Nakama-tachi no Yukue – Kyodai no Hakajirushi to Pantsu no On" (Japanese: 仲間達の行方 巨大の墓標とパンツの恩)	Katsumi Tokoro	Hirohiko Kamisaka	June 20, 2010
Zoro tries to recover his swords, but fails to understand Perona's simple directions, thwarting her plan to get his hopes up and use Negative Hollow on him. He tries to leave the island, but gets lost, and Perona finds him after he accidentally makes his way back to the castle and leads him toward the sea, hoping to manipulate him so that she can find Thriller Bark again. Perona then notices something interesting, and after Zoro gets lost and finds his way to her, notices a large tomb, and shadowy beast-like figures with weapons attack Zoro. Meanwhile, Brook learns that the residents are giving what little food they have as tribute to him in order to gain protection from the Longarm Tribe. When the Longarm Tribe kidnaps a female worshiper, the cult asks him for help, and he agrees to help her before rejoining the rest of the crew. The story returns to the present as Luffy's ship is behind schedule en route to Marineford as Ace's execution nears.

== Home media release ==
=== Japanese ===
Avex Mode (Japan, Region 2 DVD)
Volume		Episodes	Release date	Ref.
13thシーズン インペルダウン篇	piece.01	422–425	June 1, 2011	
13thシーズン インペルダウン篇	piece.02	430–433	June 1, 2011	
13thシーズン インペルダウン篇	piece.03	434–437	July 6, 2011	
13thシーズン インペルダウン篇	piece.04	438–441	July 6, 2011	
13thシーズン インペルダウン篇	piece.05	442–445	August 3, 2011	
13thシーズン インペルダウン篇	piece.06	446–449	August 3, 2011	
13thシーズン インペルダウン篇	piece.07	450–453	September 7, 2011	
13thシーズン インペルダウン篇	piece.08	454–458	September 7, 2011	
ONE PIECE Log Collection	"IMPEL DOWN"	422–441	July 25, 2014	
ONE PIECE Log Collection	"MAGELLAN"	442–458	July 25, 2014	
ONE PIECE FILM STRONG WORLD 連動特別篇 金獅子の野望		426–429	July 23, 2010	

=== English ===
In North America, the season was recategorized as the end of "Season Seven" and the opening of "Season Eight" for its DVD release by Funimation Entertainment. The Australian Season Seven sets were renamed Collection 35 through 38.

Funimation Entertainment (USA, Region 1 DVD)
Volume		Episodes	Release date			ISBN	Ref.
Volume		Episodes	USA	UK	Australia	ISBN	Ref.
Season Seven	Voyage Four	422–433	December 15, 2015	N/A	March 2, 2016	ISBN N/A	
Season Seven	Voyage Five	434–445	January 26, 2016	N/A	April 6, 2016	ISBN N/A	
Season Seven	Voyage Six	446–456	April 26, 2016	N/A	July 6, 2016	ISBN N/A	
Season Eight	Voyage One	457–468	May 31, 2016	N/A	October 5, 2016	ISBN N/A	
Collections	18	422-445	February 14, 2017	August 20, 2018	N/A	ISBN N/A	
Collections	19	446-468	May 23, 2017	October 22, 2018	N/A	ISBN N/A	
Treasure Chest Collection	Five	397-491	N/A		September 6, 2017	ISBN N/A	
Voyage Collection	Nine	397-445	N/A		May 9, 2018	ISBN N/A	
Voyage Collection	Ten	446-491	N/A		July 4, 2018	ISBN N/A	
