= One Piece season 12 =

One Piece
- Season 12; Amazon Lily
- The cover of the first DVD compilation released by Avex Mode of the twelfth season.
- No. of episodes: 14

Release
- Original network: Fuji Television
- Original release: July 5 – October 11, 2009

Season chronology
- ← Previous; Season 11 Next → Season 13

The twelfth season of the One Piece anime series was directed by Hiroaki Miyamoto and produced by Toei Animation. It contains a single story arc, "Amazon Lily", which mainly adapts material from the 53rd and 54th volumes of Eiichiro Oda's One Piece manga, following the adventures of Monkey D. Luffy and his Straw Hat Pirates after they are scattered across the world by Bartholomew Kuma. Focusing on Luffy, the first 10 episodes depict his stay on Amazon Lily, an island that is inhabited solely by the Kuja, a tribe of women warriors, and ruled by their leader, Boa Hancock, the world's most beautiful woman and one of the Seven Warlords of the Sea. The remaining 4 episodes give insight into the fates of Luffy's crew, while Luffy with Hancock's help, who fell in love with him, travels to Impel Down, the world's largest prison, to save his adoptive older brother, Portgas D. Ace, from execution.

The season initially ran from July 5 through October 11, 2009, on Fuji Television in Japan. The first two DVD compilations were released on April 6, 2011. The last two volumes were released on May 11, 2011. In Video Research's audience measurements in the Kantō region, these initial airings received household ratings ranging from 8.6 to 12.0, which earned every episode a place in Video Research's weekly Top 10 ranking of anime shows. The North American licensor of the series, Funimation, streamed the whole season's episodes subtitled in English for free on their website. Episodes 408 to 414 were streamed from the August 26 through the 28, 2009. On August 29, 2009, the rest of the season's episodes, starting from episode 415 onwards, were streamed as a simulcast, only one hour after they aired on Fuji Television in Japan.

Only a single piece of theme music is used during the season: the opening theme "Share the World" by TVXQ.

== Episodes ==
No. overall (Note: Episode number by Toei Animation's count)	No. in season	Title (Note: Title of the episode: as given by Funimation Entertainment's subtitles, romanized using Hepburn romanization, and in kanji form)	Directed by	Written by	Original release date (Note: Date the episode originally aired on Fuji Television)
Amazon Lily
408	1	"Landing! The All-Female Island, Amazon Lily"; Transliteration: "Jōriku! Danshi Kinsei no Shima Amazon Rirī" (Japanese: 上陸! 男子禁制の島アマゾン·リリー)	Yoshihiro Ueda	Hirohiko Kamisaka	July 5, 2009
Three days have passed since the incident at Sabaody Archipelago. Having been hit by Kuma, Monkey D. Luffy is teleported to an unknown island. Searching for food, he comes across some unknown mushrooms, and eats them. Unfortunately, these mushrooms are "mushrooms-growing-on-body-mushrooms", and as Luffy goes to sleep, mushrooms start growing on his body. He is discovered by a trio of amazon women who take him to their city in order to cure him, but during the cleaning process, it's discovered that Luffy, unlike everyone else on the island, is a man.
409	2	"Hurry Back to Your Friends! The Maiden Island Adventure"; Transliteration: "Isoge! Nakama no Moto e – Nyōgashima no Bōken" (Japanese: 急げ! 仲間のもとへ 女ヶ島の冒険)	Katsumi Tokoro	Hitoshi Tanaka	July 12, 2009
Luffy realizes that the island's name is Amazon Lily, an island populated entirely by the Kuja tribe of women warriors that men are not permitted to set foot on. He wakes up in a cell and receives clothing from some of the women there, who have never seen a man before and have no knowledge of them. He inadvertently angers his captors and is forced to escape when they try to kill him, taking a woman named Margaret hostage in order to recover his Vivre Card. While Luffy learns about the island from Margaret, his pursuers become desperate to eliminate him before the Snake Princess, their leader, returns soon.
410	3	"Everyone Falls in Love! Pirate Empress Hancock"; Transliteration: "Minna Meromero! Kaizoku Jotei Hankokku" (Japanese: みんなメロメロ! 海賊女帝ハンコック)	Yutaka Nakashima	Yoshiyuki Suga	July 19, 2009
Luffy resolves to leave the island, reunite with his crew and defeat the enemies who had overpowered them earlier, and decides to borrow a ship. Margaret then realizes that she cannot afford to be friendly with Luffy, and attacks him, forcing him to flee. A few kilometers from the island, Boa Hancock - the Snake Princess and one of the Seven Warlords of the Sea - meets with a Navy vessel commanded by Vice-Admiral Momonga, who informs her of Portgas D. Ace's upcoming execution and the likelihood of Whitebeard intervening. He orders her to join the fight against Whitebeard's forces or risk losing her status as a Warlord and having the treaty between Kuja and the World Government annulled. Hancock refuses and, using her Love-Love Fruit powers, turns his men to stone and leaves.
411	4	"The Secret Hidden on the Backs – Luffy and the Snake Princess Meet"; Transliteration: "Senaka ni Kakusareta Himitsu – Sōgū Rufi to Hebihime" (Japanese: 背中に隠された秘密 遭遇ルフィと蛇姫)	Yukihiko Nakao	Hitoshi Tanaka	August 2, 2009
Hancock's ship reaches Amazon Lily and she returns to her palace. Nyon, a former ruler of the island, urges Hancock to answer the summons in order to keep the treaty that protects her people, but Hancock refuses and throws her out a window. Hancock goes to take a bath, and some of the villagers discuss a legend that states that Hancock and her sisters defeated a Gorgon, but received eyes that turn anyone who looks at them to stone. Luffy, searching for someone from whom he can borrow a ship, falls into the bath. He sees something on Hancock's back that surprises him, but does not turn him to stone.
412	5	"Heartless Judgment! Margaret is Turned to Stone!!"; Transliteration: "Hijō no Sabaki! Ishi ni Sareta Māgaretto!!" (Japanese: 非情の裁き! 石にされたマーガレット!!)	Gō Koga	Yoshiyuki Suga	August 9, 2009
Luffy looks at Hancock's back and notes that he saw what was on it before. Hancock tries, but fails to turn him to stone with her powers when he mistakes her Love-Love abilities for Foxy's Slow-Slow Beam. Luffy tries to escape but gets captured by the Kuja pirates and is brought to the execution arena. Margaret confesses to bringing him to the island, and Hancock turns her and two of her companions to stone. Enraged at the Kuja's lack of empathy for Margaret, Luffy punches out Bakula, the panther sent to execute him. Hancock's two younger sisters, Sandersonia and Marigold, jump into the arena and using their Devil Fruit powers, transform into snake-women to fight Luffy.
413	6	"A Difficult Fight for Luffy! The Snake Sisters' Haki Power!!"; Transliteration: "Rufi Daikusen! Hebi Shimai no Haki no Chikara!!" (Japanese: ルフィ第苦戦! ヘビ姉妹の覇気の力!!)	Sumio Watanabe	Hitoshi Tanaka	August 16, 2009
Luffy gets the petrified Margaret and her friends to safety and then fights against Sandersonia and Marigold, but struggles against their Devil Fruit powers and their ability to predict his moves with "Haki". When Sandersonia plans on breaking the petrified Marguerite in order to cause Luffy pain, he screams for her to stop, forcing her to stop and causing many of the assembled warriors to faint by using a special and rare kind of Haki Hancock identifies as a Conqueror's Spirit. With Margaret safe, Luffy prepares to fight at full power.
414	7	"All-Out Special Power Battle!! Gum-Gum vs. Snake-Snake"; Transliteration: "Nōryoku Zenkai Batoru!! Gomu Gomu vs. Hebi Hebi" (Japanese: 能力全開バトル!! ゴムゴムVSヘビヘビ)	Directed by : Yutaka Nakashima; Storyboarded by : Makoto Sonoda	Yoshiyuki Suga	August 23, 2009
Luffy activates Gear Second and gains the upper hand. Desperate to finish him off, Marigold and Sandersonia attempt to finish him off with their strongest moves, but Luffy fights them off and ties their tails together. Marigold's fire attack accidentally burns the clothes off Sandersonia's back, prompting Hancock to order everyone to evacuate or risk seeing the "Gorgon Eyes". Luffy covers the symbol on her back with his body, saying that while she is his enemy, her secret has nothing to do with his fight. Hancock is then moved to tears.
Post-Amazon Lily
415	8	"Hancock's Confession – The Sisters' Abhorrent Past"; Transliteration: "Hankokku no Kokuhaku – Shimai no Imawashiki Kako" (Japanese: ハンコックの告白 姉妹の忌まわしき過去)	Yoshihiro Ueda	Hitoshi Tanaka	August 30, 2009
Sandersonia and Marigold concede defeat to Luffy, and Hancock agrees to grant Luffy the choice of getting a ship or saving Margaret, and he chooses the latter. Luffy is brought to the palace, where Hancock is shocked to learn of Luffy's attack on the World Noble. Luffy learns that the three sisters were once slaves of the World Nobles, but were freed when Fisher Tiger attacked Mariejois, and that he eventually founded the Sunny Pirates from former slaves. Hancock then grants Luffy use of her ship.
416	9	"Saving Ace! The Next Stop: the Great Prison!"; Transliteration: "Ēsu o Sukue! Arata na Mokutekichi wa Daikangoku" (Japanese: エースを救え! 新たな目的地は大監獄)	Katsumi Tokoro	Yoshiyuki Suga	September 6, 2009
Following a party, Luffy learns from Nyon that Hancock is a Warlady of the Sea, and that they have been called together as the Navy is launching an all-out offensive on Whitebeard. When Luffy hears that they are planning on executing his adoptive brother Ace at Marinford to lure Whitebeard out, he decides to save him from the prison Impel Down before he's transported away. The only hope of him getting there in time is for Hancock to answer to the call for the Warlords so Luffy can hitch a ride on her ship, but the empress has just caught a disease, and is lying in bed.
417	10	"Love is a Hurricane! Love-Love Hancock!"; Transliteration: "Koi wa Harikēn! Meromero Hankokku" (Japanese: 恋はハリケーン! メロメロハンコック)	Naoyuki Itō	Yoshiyuki Suga	September 13, 2009
Nyon discovers that Hancock's disease is the same one that killed her two predecessors, and has Hancock meet with Luffy. Luffy requests that Hancock take him to Impel Down, and when Hancock agrees, much to everyone's shock, Nyon realizes that she is in love with Luffy. Hancock boards Momonga's ship to answer the summons, smuggling Luffy aboard inside her clothes, and de-petrifies the crew before the ship sails to Impel Down. Elsewhere, Sengoku notes that Jimbei, one of the Seven Warlords, refuses to fight and is being held in Impel Down, and learns that the 23 ships observing Whitebeard's flagship have been destroyed. Monkey D. Garp visits his adoptive grandson Ace in prison.
Straw Hat's Separation Serial
418	11	"The Friends' Whereabouts – The Science of Weather and the Mechanical Island"; Transliteration: "Nakama-tachi no Yukue – Tenkō no Kagaku to Karakurishima" (Japanese: 仲間達の行方 天候の科学とからくり島)	Tetsuya Endō	Hitoshi Tanaka	September 20, 2009
Luffy proceeds to Impel Down with Hancock, but worries about his friends. Nami finds herself on Weatheria, a sky island dedicated to the study of weather, and learns about a special rope that can create winds. She uses the rope with her Clima Tact to stop a storm. Franky ends up on the futuristic Mechanical Island, and is frozen solid in the cold. He is rescued but because there is no cola on the island, is given tea instead and becomes a gentleman.
419	12	"The Friends' Whereabouts! An Island of Giant Birds and a Pink Paradise!"; Transliteration: "Nakama-tachi no Yukue – Kyōdori no Shima to Momoiro no Rakuen!" (Japanese: 仲間達の行方 巨鳥の島と桃色の楽園!)	Yutaka Nakashima	Yoshiyuki Suga	September 27, 2009
Chopper lands on an island known as Birdie Kingdom, and finds himself in the nest of two large birds who play with him before accidentally dropping him into the forest below. While searching for food to regain his strength, some residents of the island capture him. When they leave to shoo away the birds after an unsuccessful attempt at stealing their nest, Chopper escapes the pot and realizes that the birds rule the island. Sanji finds himself on Peachy Island, seemingly entirely populated by beautiful women, and someone named Elizabeth nurses him until he wakes up. He goes to Elizabeth's house to return a handkerchief, only to find that Elizabeth is actually a male cross-dresser, and begins desperately running when the island's residents attempt to get him to cross-dress.
420	13	"The Friends' Whereabouts – Bridging the Islands and Vicious Vegetations!"; Transliteration: "Nakama-tachi no Yukue – Shima o Tsunagu Hashi to Shokujin Shokubutsu" (Japanese: 仲間達の行方 島をつなぐ橋と食人植物)	Gō Koga	Hitoshi Tanaka	October 4, 2009
Robin finds herself on Tequila Wolf, a snow-covered island. She is taken in by Soran, a young girl who works on the island as a slave, and tells her much about the outside world, which she pretends to visit by drawing pictures. Some soldiers break in to find Robin, smashing Soran's pictures in an attempt to determine her location, and Robin is captured. She learns that she is on an island full of prisoners and citizens of countries that refused to join the World Government, and that she and the others are being forced to build a bridge. Meanwhile, Usopp finds himself on Bowin Island, an island full of man-eating plants, with a man named Heracles.
421	14	"The Friends' Whereabouts! A Negative Princess and the King of Demons!"; Transliteration: "Nakama-tachi no Yukue – Negatibu Purinsesu to Akumaō" (Japanese: 仲間達の行方 ネガティブ王女と悪魔王)	Katsumi Tokoro	Yoshiyuki Suga	October 11, 2009
Zoro lands on the island where Kuma sent Perona. Perona treats his wounds, but forces him to stay while subjecting him to humiliating treatment. Brook finds himself in the Land of Poverty, where he is mistaken for Satan, whom the islanders had summoned for revenge against the Long-Arm tribe. Famous Marine officers gather at Marine Headquarters, as do the rest of the Shichibukai besides Hancock. In Impel Down, Ace begs Garp to kill him, but Garp says that even if he did, the war with Whitebeard cannot be avoided.

== Home media release ==
=== Japanese ===
Avex Mode (Japan, Region 2 DVD)
Volume		Episodes	Release date	Ref.
12thシーズン 女ヶ島篇	piece.01	408–411	April 6, 2011	
12thシーズン 女ヶ島篇	piece.02	412–415	April 6, 2011	
12thシーズン 女ヶ島篇	piece.03	416–418	May 11, 2011	
12thシーズン 女ヶ島篇	piece.04	419–421	May 11, 2011	
ONE PIECE Log Collection	"HANCOCK"	408–421	December 20, 2013	

=== English ===
In North America, the season was recategorized as part of "Season Seven" for its DVD release by Funimation Entertainment. The Australian Season Seven sets were renamed Collection 33 and 34.

Funimation Entertainment (USA, Region 1 DVD)
Volume		Episodes	Release date			ISBN	Ref.
Volume		Episodes	USA	UK	Australia	ISBN	Ref.
Season Seven	Voyage Two	397–409	September 1, 2015	N/A	November 18, 2015	ISBN N/A	
Season Seven	Voyage Three	410–421	October 27, 2015	N/A	January 13, 2016	ISBN N/A	
Collections	Collection 17	397–421	October 11, 2016	June 25, 2018	N/A	ISBN N/A	
Treasure Chest Collection	Five	397-491	N/A		September 6, 2017	ISBN N/A	
Voyage Collection	Nine	397-445	N/A		May 9, 2018	ISBN N/A	
