= List of One Piece television specials =

The cover of the first TV special's DVD release

The One Piece anime series, based on the manga of same name, has spawned thirteen television specials that aired on Fuji TV. Of these specials, the first four, as well as the sixth, eighth, tenth and eleventh are original stories created by the anime staff, while the fifth, seventh, ninth, twelfth and thirteenth specials are alternate re-tellings of certain story arcs.

On April 7, 2013, a two-part hour-long crossover TV special, between Dragon Ball Z, One Piece and Toriko, referred to as Dream 9 Toriko x One Piece x Dragon Ball Z Super Collaboration Special!! aired on Fuji TV. The first part is named "Run, Strongest Team! Toriko, Luffy, Goku!" (走れ最強軍団！トリコとルフィと悟空！, Hashire Saikyō Gundan! Toriko to Luffy to Goku!) and the second is titled "History's Strongest Collaboration vs. Glutton of the Sea" (史上最強コラボVS海の大食漢, Shijō Saikyō Collaboration vs. Umi no Taishokukan). The plot has the International Gourmet Organization (from Toriko) sponsoring the Tenka'ichi Shokuōkai, a race with no rules that characters from all three series compete in.

Three of the specials received limited theatrical releases in South Korea in 2014; Episode of Merry, Episode of Nami and Episode of Luffy were released on August 28, December 6 and December 10, grossing ₩28,590,200 ($27,152), ₩12,319,500 ($11,700) and ₩11,342,500 ($10,772) respectively. As with the franchise's anime television series, specials eight through thirteen have been streamed with English subtitles in North America by Funimation and Crunchyroll and released on home video by Funimation with Japanese and English-dubbed versions.

== Specials ==
No.	Title	Directed by	Written by	Animation directed by	Original release date	Runtime
SP1	"Luffy's Adventure at the Bottom of the Ocean" (Note: Translated by Viz Media as "Luffy Falls! Adventure in the Navel of the Sea"); Transliteration: "Wan Pīsu Terebi Supesharu: Umi no Heso no Daibōken" (Japanese: ワンピース TVスペシャル 海のヘソの大冒険)	Yukio Kaizawa	Story by : Junki Takegami; Teleplay by : Hiroshi Hashimoto	Noboru Koizumi	December 20, 2000	50 minutes
The Straw Hat Pirates get sucked into a big drain hole in the middle of the ocean and at the bottom find a mysterious island known as the "Ocean's Navel" that is being destroyed by giant monsters. They explore the place and resolve to find the island's treasure, which can supposedly grant any wish, but the island's inhabitants possess agendas of their own for their new guests. They help the people living there, fight the monsters, and find a way to get back out.
SP2	"Out Into the Ocean! A Father's Great Big Dream" "Open Upon the Great Sea! A Father's Huge, HUGE Dream!"; Transliteration: "Wan Pīsu: Daiunabara ni Hirake! Dekkai Dekkai Chichi no Yume!" (Japanese: ワンピース 大海原にひらけ!でっかいでっカイ父の夢!)	Munehisa Sakai	Story by : Junki Takegami; Teleplay by : Yoshiyuki Suga	Takeo Ide	April 6, 2003	46 minutes
The story opens on Pirate Zap's grandma's ship, where two of his crew, Bonnie and Max, are tired and want to escape, but unfortunately they have no money. Three children were being held captive on the ship overhear them. The eldest, Amanda, whose father was a pro treasure hunter, knows the whereabouts ofdeal. If they help them make a clean escape, they could take all the treasure they wanted. They agree, and the five of them barely escape and make it onto a small island where they meet Luffy and his crew. Unfortunately they were pursued and Luffy and Amanda are captured and brought back to their boss, the head of the Bayan Pirates, who is also after the treasure. Now Luffy and the others must battle the Bayan pirates and find the treasure that Amanda's father had left for his children. Amanda, who has always resented adventure and treasure because her father was constantly gone in search for it, finally understands his feelings. This TV Special is aired between episodes 149 and 150.
SP3	"Save! The Last Big Stage"; Transliteration: "Wan Pīsu: Mamoru! Saigo no Daibutai" (Japanese: ワンピース 守れ!最後の大舞台)	Junji Shimizu	Junki Takegami	TBA	December 14, 2003	46 minutes
The renowned Randolph troupe is in town and they are putting on a special farewell play to mark their leader's retirement. When three of its actors quit a mere thirty minutes before the curtain rises, the Straw Pirates offer their services; though with Robin's overacting, Usopp trying to hog the limelight and Luffy gate-crashing the stage dressed as a monkey, the first act becomes more of a farce instead! Before the second act can commence, Randolph is arrested by the marines for selling stolen weapons to pirates, and boards the ship to prove his innocence. There, he is confronted by the Marine Commander named Governor, a former subordinate of Randolph's, who has concocted the whole plan in order to exact his revenge on the ex-marine. Now, in addition to rescuing Randolph and protecting his ship, Luffy must also convince the troupe leader that not all pirates are bloodthirsty brutes. Whatever happens, one thing's for sure - the show must go on! This TV Special is aired between episodes 174 and 175.
SP4	"One Piece Historical Drama Series: Luffy's Detective Story" "One Piece: End-of-Year Special Plan! Chief Straw Hat Luffy's Detective Story"; Transliteration: "Wan Pīsu: Nenmatsu Tokubetsu Kikaku! Mugiwara no Rufi Oyabun Torimonochō" (Japanese: ワンピース年末特別企画!麦わらのルフィ親分捕物帖)	Unknown	Unknown	TBA	December 18, 2005	42 minutes
Buggy and his "Clown Family" are causing havoc in Feudal Era Grand Line. They've kidnapped Onami (Nami) and it's up to Luffy, Usopp and Sanji to save her. After a failed attempt by the Buggy Family they try to capture Princess Vivi, only to fail again and be defeated by Luffy and Zoro.
SP5	"Episode of Nami: Tears of a Navigator and the Bonds of Friends"; Transliteration: "Episōdo obu Nami: Kōkaishi no Namida to Nakama no Kizuna" (Japanese: エピソードオブナミ ～航海士の涙と仲間の絆～)	Katsumi Tokoro	Hirohiko Kamisaka	TBA	August 25, 2012	106 minutes
An abridged remake of the Arlong Park story arc: (Note: As previously featured in the first season of the TV series and volumes eight to eleven of the manga) Some time after his alliance the Straw Hats, Nami steals the Going Merry and returns to her home in Cocoyashi Village, which is under the control of the Arlong Pirates. When Usopp finds Nami, Arlong orders her to kill him, and she injures herself while faking Usopp's death. Once the Straw Hats regroup, Nami's adopted older sister Nojiko, aware of the bond they had, explains that when Arlong took control of the village, he murdered Nami's adopted mother and held Cocoyashi's citizens as ransom to exploit Nami's exceptional talent for cartography. After Arlong informs Nezumi, a corrupt bribed Marine, of where Nami's earnings are hidden, the village riots against Arlong despite poor odds. After Nami tearfully asks Luffy for help, he and the remaining Straw Hats free the village by fighting and defeating the Arlong Pirates. After a days-long celebration, Nami officially joins the Straw Hats crew as navigator.
SP6	"Episode of Luffy: Adventure on Hand Island"; Transliteration: "Episōdo obu Rufi – Hando Airando no Bōken" (Japanese: エピソードオブルフィ ～ハンドアイランドの冒険～)	Hiroyuki Morita, Mitsuru Hongo	Yasuyuki Tsutsumi	TBA	December 15, 2012	102 minutes
An original story with flashback sequences remaking Luffy's history with Shanks and first encounter with Coby. (Note: Luffy's history with Shanks and Coby previously featured in the first episodes of the TV series and volume one of the manga) Luffy befriends wax sculptor Diego and helps free his son Regis, who has been imprisoned by corrupt Marine Commodore Bilić.
SP7	"Episode of Merry: The Tale of One More Friend"; Transliteration: "Episōdo obu Merī: Mō Hitori no Nakama no Monogatari" (Japanese: エピソードオブメリー ～もうひとりの仲間の物語～)	Katsumi Tokoro	Hirohiko Kamisaka	TBA	August 24, 2013	106 minutes
An abridged remake of the Water 7 and Enies Lobby story arcs, (Note: As previously featured in the eighth and ninth season of the TV series and volumes thirty four to forty four of the manga) from Luffy and Usopp's fight and Robin's disappearance to the crew's battle against CP9 to get Robin back, and the crew's final farewell to the ship.
SP8	"3D2Y: Overcoming Ace's Death! Luffy's Pledge to his Friends"; Transliteration: "Surī-Dī Tsū-Wai: Ēsu no Shi o Koete! Rufi Nakama to no Chikai" (Japanese: 〝3D2Y〟 エースの死を越えて! ルフィ仲間との誓い)	Naoyuki Itou	Hirohiko Kamisaka, Jin Tanaka, Tomohiro Nakayama	TBA	August 30, 2014	107 minutes
Luffy is 18 months into his training in Ruskaina when several Navy ships are attacked by Byrnndi World; (Note: Luffy's training takes place prior to season fifteen of the TV series and during volume sixty one of the manga. Events from the Impel Down and Paramount War storylines, which featured in the thirteenth and fourteenth seasons and volumes fifty four to fifty nine, are also referenced.) World was imprisoned after several of his crew gave him away to the Navy and revealed themselves to be Cipher Pol spies, but escaped Impel Down during the War of the Best and has now reunited with members of his former crew. World kidnaps Marigold and Sandersonia, and Luffy and Hancock set out to rescue them. They arrive at World's ship, which holds a huge newly built cannon; Buggy and Mihawk also arrive due to the Warlords being summoned. Once Luffy, Hancock and Buggy have taken out the remainder of World's crew, his brother Byojack unsuccessfully tries to convince him to abandon his revenge, but World reveals that he is still enraged over their "betrayal" and has been using his crew as a means to an end. Luffy overhears this and it, combined with World's taunting of Ace's death, motivates him enough to successfully defeat World using Gum-Gum Red Hawk with Armament Haki ability that he had been honing on Ruskaina. Severely weakened, World uses the cannon on approaching Navy ships, but the attack is deflected by Mihawk and the Navy successfully destroys World's ship with World, Byojack and the crew inside as Luffy manages to escape the ship's destruction. Six months later, Luffy reunites with his crew.
SP9	"Episode of Sabo: The Three Brothers' Bond – The Miraculous Reunion and the Inherited Will"; Transliteration: "Episōdo obu Sabo: San-Kyōdai no Kizuna – Kiseki no Saikai to Uketsugareru Ishi" (Japanese: エピソードオブサボ 〜3兄弟の絆 奇跡の再会と受け継がれる意志〜)	Gou Koga	Hirohiko Kamisaka	TBA	August 22, 2015	107 minutes
An abridged remake of Sabo's childhood and the Dressrosa story arc. (Note: Sabo's childhood previously featured in the fourteenth season of the TV series and volumes fifty nine and sixty of the manga. The Dressrossa storyline featured in seventeenth season and volumes seventy one to eighty.) After Ace's death in the Summit War of Marineford, which is seen in flashbacks, Sabo appears at his grave. He later arrives in Dressrosa to investigate a weapon smuggling, where he is informed that Doflamingo is holding a tournament at the nearby coliseum with Ace's Flame-Flame Fruit as a prize. Luffy's crew soon arrives in Dressrosa and, entering the tournament under the alias "Lucy", he gets to the final round. Recognizing Luffy, Sabo reminisces about their shared childhood: Sabo and Ace refuse to befriend Luffy, but change their mind after he is kidnapped by a pirate and beaten for refusing to give away the location of their treasure. Later, the three declare themselves sworn brothers. When his father finds them, Sabo reveals that he is a Noble who ran away from home and is forced to go back to his biological family. Sabo is told about a plan to burn down the poor area of the country and unsuccessfully tries to warn Ace and Luffy. Sabo escapes home again to become a pirate, but his boat is shot down and he's presumed dead. In the present day: the Straw Hats join an uprising against Doflamingo and, after revealing his identity, Sabo agrees to take "Lucy's" place so that Luffy can join them. As the Straw Hats revert Dressrosa's toy slaves back to humans, Sabo wins the tournament and eats the Flame-Flame fruit, "borrowing" Ace's Fire Fist technique.
SP10	"One Piece: Adventure of Nebulandia"; Transliteration: "Wan Píszu: Adobenchā Obu Neburandia" (Japanese: ワンピース アドベンチャー オブ ネブランディア)	Kōnosuke Uda	Atsuhiro Tomioka	TBA	December 19, 2015	106 minutes
The Straw Hat Pirates follow a false distress signal to the Foxy Pirates, who seek revenge after their first defeat in Davy Back Fight. (Note: As featured in the seventh season of the TV series and volumes thirty two to thirty four of the manga.) The two crews begin another Davy Back Fight, where Foxy's new crewmate Komei suggests a mushroom eating contest as the first round; when the Drousy Mushrooms incapacitate Zoro, Sanji, Porche and Hamburg, Komei reveals himself to be an undercover Marine Vice Admiral and takes the four of them to the island Nebulandia as prisoners. Brook, Chopper and the Foxy Pirates look for Revival Mushrooms to reverse the effects, while the remaining Straw Hats head to Nebulanida with Foxy. Nebulandia nullifies Devil Fruit powers due to indigenous vegetation living off sea water, cause more of the group to be captured. Chopper and Brook find the Revival Mushrooms growing on a creature they nickname Mushroomconda; after they free it from a Marine trap, it transports them to Nebulandia and helps them fight the Marines. An undercover Marine shoots Luffy in the head, but the bullet is deflected by merchandise Foxy had given to him earlier. The prisoners are rescued and Komei's Marines are defeated by Luffy's crew and Foxy's crew. Later, Foxy attempts to make his ultimate betrayal to Luffy but is himself tricked by a mirage preemptively created by Nami.
SP11	"One Piece: Heart of Gold"; Transliteration: "Wan Píszu: Hāto obu Gōrudo" (Japanese: ワンピース ハートオブ ゴールド)	Tatsuya Nagamine	Tsutomu Kuroiwa	TBA	July 16, 2016	104 minutes
The Straw Hat Pirates meet Olga, a girl who has escaped the island Alchemi. Alchemi was once known for its metal production, and for the creation of the extremely valuable Pure Gold, but the island disappeared two hundred years ago. Olga is now being pursued by the Marines who are interested in the Pure Gold. Gildo Tesoro, who controls the Navy HQ and black market, hears of Olga and hires Treasure Hunter Mad Treasure to track her down. The Straw Hats join forces with Olga in search of the Pure Gold, while she plots to takes advantage of them and use the treasure to become rich herself.
SP12	"One Piece: Episode of East Blue: Luffy and His Four Friends' Great Adventure"; Transliteration: "Wan Píszu: Episōdo obu Īsuto Burū: Rufi to Yo-nin no Nakama no Dai-bōken" (Japanese: ワンピース エピソードオブ東の海（イーストブルー）～ルフィと4人の仲間の大冒険～)	Takashi Otsuka	Tomohiro Nakayama	TBA	August 26, 2017	106 minutes
An abridged remake of several East Blue story arcs. (Note: As featured in the first season of the TV series and volumes one to twevlve of the manga.) Luffy is inspired to become a pirate by Shanks; Zoro is imprisoned by corrupt marine Captain Morgan, rescued by Luffy and later defeated by the world's greatest swordsman Dracule Mihawk; Usopp defends his village from the infamous pirate captain Kuro with the Straw Hats' help; Sanji is rescued by the infamous pirate Zeff as a child and later defends their Baratie restaurant from feared pirate commodore Don Krieg; Nami joins the Straw Hats but is forced to steal their ship and return to terrific fishman tyrant Arlong in Cocoyashi village, where Luffy soon defeats Arlong and frees her.
SP13	"Episode of Skypiea"; Transliteration: "Episōdo obu Sorajima" (Japanese: エピソードオブ空島)	Tetsuya Endo	Tomohiro Nakayama	TBA	August 25, 2018	105 minutes
An abridged remake of the Skypiea story arc. (Note: As featured in the sixth season of the TV series and volumes twenty four to thirty two of the manga.) The Straw Hats discover a map to Skypiea, a supposedly mythical civilization in the sky. They soon meet Mont Blanc Cricket, who directs them to a natural underwater explosion which serves as transport to the islands in the sky. Once in Skypiea, the Straw Hats are targeted by the tyrannical ruler Eneru and his subordinates, as well as local rebels. Luffy defeats Eneru, bringing peace to Skypiea, and proves to Cricket that Skypiea is not a myth.

== Home media ==
=== Japan ===
The first special was released on VHS, and specials five onward have been released on Blu-ray. The Log Collections are available on DVD only.

Avex Pictures (VHS, DVD, Blu-ray)
Volume		Episodes	Release date	Ref.
TVスペシャル 海のヘソの大冒険篇		SP1	January 1, 2002	
貝獣島と漁師島の2つの大冒険		SP2, SP3	August 6, 2004	
時代劇スペシャル「ルフィ親分捕物帖」通常版		SP4	August 4, 2006	
エピソード・オブ・ナミ～航海士の涙と仲間の絆～		SP5	November 30, 2012	
エピソード・オブ・ルフィ～9人の麦わらの一味 新世界Ver.～		SP6	March 22, 2013	
エピソード・オブ・メリー～もうひとりの仲間の物語～		SP7	November 29, 2013	
ONE PIECE〝3D2Y〟 エースの死を越えて！ ルフィ仲間との誓い		SP8	November 28, 2014	
エピソード オブ サボ ～3兄弟の絆 奇跡の再会と受け継がれる意志～		SP9	November 27, 2015	
ONE PIECE アドベンチャー オブ ネブランディア		SP10	March 25, 2016	
ワンピース ～ハートオブ ゴールド～		SP11	October 28, 2016	
ONE PIECE エピソード オブ東の海 ～ルフィと4人の仲間の大冒険!!～		SP12	November 24, 2017	
ONE PIECE エピソード オブ空島		SP13	November 23, 2018	
ONE PIECE Log Collection Special	"JIDAIGEKI"	SP4, 291-292, 303, 406-407	October 23, 2015	
ONE PIECE Log Collection Special	"Episode of EASTBLUE"	SP5, SP12, films: 8, 9	March 29, 2019	
ONE PIECE Log Collection Special	"Episode of GRANDLINE"	SP7, SP8, SP13	April 26, 2019	
ONE PIECE Log Collection Special	"Episode of NEWWORLD"	SP6, SP9, SP10, SP11	May 24, 2019	

== English ==
The TV specials have been released on DVD and Blu-ray.

Funimation Entertainment (USA, Region 1/A), Madman Entertainment (Australia, Region 4/B)
Volume	Episodes	Release date		ISBN	Ref.
Volume	Episodes	USA	Australia	ISBN	Ref.
Heart of Gold	SP11	May 2, 2017	July 19, 2017	ISBN N/A	
3D2Y: Overcome Ace's Death! Luffy's Pledge to his Friends	SP8	January 22, 2019	April 3, 2019	ISBN N/A	
Episode of Sabo: The Three Brothers' Bond – The Miraculous Reunion and the Inherited Will	SP9	March 19, 2019	June 5, 2019	ISBN N/A	
Adventure of Nebulandia	SP10	June 18, 2019	August 7, 2019	ISBN N/A	
Episode of East Blue: Luffy and His Four Friends' Great Adventure	SP12	September 24, 2019	December 4, 2019	ISBN N/A	
Episode of Skypiea	SP13	November 26, 2019	February 5, 2020	ISBN N/A	
One Piece Film Collection	SP11, films: 10, 12, 13	N/A	October 3, 2018	ISBN N/A	

== See also ==
- List of One Piece media
- List of One Piece films
