= List of One Piece chapters (187–388) =

Volume 21 of One Piece, released in Japan by Shueisha on December 4, 2001

One Piece is a Japanese manga series written and illustrated by Eiichiro Oda which has been translated into various languages and spawned a substantial media franchise, including animated and live action television series, films, video games, and associated music and merchandise. It follows the adventures of the teenaged boy and pirate captain Monkey D. Luffy, whose body gained the properties of rubber after he accidentally ate a supernatural fruit, as he travels the oceans in search of the series' titular treasure and organizes a diverse crew, named the Straw Hats.

In Japan, the series is published by Shueisha. Individual chapters have been published regularly in the shōnen manga anthology Weekly Shōnen Jump since July 22, 1997 and tankōbon format volumes (each collecting 10 to 12 chapters) have been published since December 24, 1997. The series spans over 1175 chapters and, as of March 2026, has 114 tankōbon volumes, making One Piece the 20th longest manga series by volume count.

The series has been translated and released in multiple countries. English localization began in North America, where Viz Media currently serializes One Piece in the Shonen Jump digital vault simultaneously with Japan. It originally published its English language adaptation of the series in the now-defunct monthly print anthology Shonen Jump starting with the magazine's launch in November 2002. It also publishes tankōbon format books since June 2003, which have been collected into omnibus editions incorporating three tankōbon each since December 2009; chapters and books also are published digitally through its website. In the United Kingdom, the tankōbon were published by Gollancz Manga, starting March 2006, until Viz Media took over after the fourteenth volume. In Australia and New Zealand, the English volumes have been distributed by Madman Entertainment since November 10, 2008. By October 6, 2009, only 22 volumes had been released in English. However, as announced in July 2009, Viz Media increased that number to 53 by June 2010, using an accelerated publishing schedule of five volumes per month during the first half of 2010. As of November 2025, 110 volumes of the English version have been officially released by Viz Media.

== Volumes ==
No.	Title	Original release date	English release date
21	Utopia; Risōkyō (理想郷)	December 4, 2001; 4-08-873194-8	June 2, 2009; 978-1-4215-2429-0
187. "Stalemate" (互角, "Gokaku"); 188. "Oh Come My Way Karate" (オカマ拳法, "Okama Kenpō"); 189. "2"; 190. "Climate Baton" (天候棒, "Kurima Takuto"); 191. "She Who Controls the Weather" (天候を操る女, "Tenkō o Ayatsuru Onna"); 192. "Tornado Warning" (旋風注意報, "Senpū Chūi Hō"); 193. "Utopia" (理想郷, "Risōkyō"); 194. "Cutting Steel" (鉄を斬る, "Tetsu o Kiru"); 195. "Mr. Bushido" (Mr.武士道, "Mr. Bushidō")
Sanji and Mr. 2 Bon Clay exchange blows, until Bon Clay discovers the sea cook's weakness and he transforms to resemble Nami to distract him. Bon Clay dominates the fight, but Sanji is able to defeat him after exploiting Bon Clay's vulnerability when he transforms. Nami fights Miss Doublefinger, partner of Mr. 1, and a Devil Fruit user who can create spikes anywhere on her body, during which she struggles with how to use her new Climate Baton weapon. Unfortunately, most of that weapon's abilities are nothing more than magic tricks. One street further, Zoro battles Mr. 1, who possesses the ability to create blades anywhere on his body. Meanwhile, Vivi reaches Chaka, the acting captain of the royal guard, but before they can stop the fighting, Crocodile and "Ms. All-Sunday" Nico Robin arrive.
22	Hope!!	February 4, 2002; 4-08-873222-7	October 6, 2009; 1-4215-2430-9
196. "1"; 197. "The Leaders" (統率者達, "Tōsotsushatachi"); 198. "4:15 P.M." (午後四時十五分, "Gogo Yo-ji Jūgo-fun"); 199. "Hope!!"; 200. "Water Luffy" (水ルフィ, "Mizu Rufi"); 201. "Nico Robin" (ニコ・ロビン, "Niko Robin"); 202. "The Royal Mausoleum" (王家の墓, "Ōke no Haka"); 203. "Crocodile-ish" (ワニっぽい, "Wanippoi"); 204. "Red"; 205. "The Sand-Sand Band's Secret Fort" (砂砂団秘密基地, "Suna-Suna-Dan Himitsu Kichi")
Despite his agents' defeats, Crocodile is still confident that his plans to take over the kingdom are nearing fruition. With Alabasta embroiled in a civil war of his own design, Crocodile needs only to destroy both warring parties in one fell swoop to take control of the country. Knowing that a cannon is the most practical way of fulfilling this purpose, Nefertari Vivi and the Straw Hat Pirates try to find its hiding place before it is too late. Meanwhile, Crocodile searches for Pluton, forcing King Cobra to lead him and Nico Robin to an ancient stone called a Ponegliff underneath the castle. But when Nico Robin says the Ponegliff has no information on the Plulton, Crocodile tries to kill her and escape before his cannon is fired. Monkey D. Luffy, having recovered and learned from their previous encounter, engages Crocodile in battle.
23	Vivi's Adventure; Bibi no Bōken (ビビの冒険)	April 4, 2002; 4-08-873252-9	December 1, 2009; 978-1-4215-2844-1
206. "Ignition" (点火, "Tenka"); 207. "Nightmare" (悪夢, "Akumu"); 208. "Guardian Spirit" (守護神, "Shugoshin"); 209. "I Will Defeat You" (越えて行く, "Koete Yuku"); 210. "Zero" ("0"); 211. "King" (王, "Ō"); 212. "Some Justice" (いくつかの正義, "Ikutsuka no Seigi"); 213. "V.I.P." ("VIP"); 214. "Strategy to Escape the Sand Kingdom" (砂の国脱出作戦, "Suna no Kuni Dasshutsu Sakusen"); 215. "Last Waltz"; 216. "Vivi's Adventure" (ビビの冒険, "Bibi no Bōken")
The cannon is hidden in the clock tower overlooking the capital city, and the Straw Hat Pirates frantically try to reach it before it is fired. In the final moments the cannon is stopped, Luffy finally defeats Crocodile, and uses the last of his energy to save King Cobra and Nico Robin. Most importantly, it begins to rain, ending the civil war and the drought that caused it. Crocodile and his agents are arrested, and the Straw Hats collapse. Alabasta tends to their wounds and celebrates them as heroes. But as pirates, they are criminals, and are forced to flee the country in secret to avoid arrest. Bon Clay distracts the Marines to allow the Straw Hats to say farewell to Vivi, and they set sail for their next adventure.
24	People's Dreams; Hito no Yume (人の夢)	July 4, 2002; 4-08-873282-0	January 5, 2010; 1-4215-2845-2
217. "Stowaway" (密航者, "Mikkōsha"); 218. "Why the Log Pose Is Dome-Shaped" (「記録指針」が丸い理由, "'Rogu Pōsu' ga Marui Wake"); 219. "Masira the Salvage King" (サルベージ王マシラ, "Sarubēji-Ō Mashira"); 220. "A Walk on the Seafloor" (海底散歩, "Kaitei Sanpo"); 221. "Monsters" (怪物, "Kaibutsu"); 222. "The Giant Novice" (大型ルーキー, "Ōgata Rūkī"); 223. "I Promise Never to Fight in This Town" (ワタクシはこの町では決してケンカしないと誓います, "Watakushi wa Kono Machi de wa Kesshite Kenka Shinai to Chikaimasu"); 224. "Do Not Dream" (夢を見るな, "Yume o Miruna"); 225. "People's Dreams" (人の夢, "Hito no Yume"); 226. "Shoujou, the Salvage King of the Seafloor" (海底探索王ショウジョウ, "Kaitei Tansaku-Ō Shōjō")
Indebted to Luffy for rescuing her, Nico Robin joins the Straw Hat Pirates. An old ship falls from the sky. Rummaging through some of its remains, while dealing with a rival salvaging crew led by the monkey-like Masira, and nearby monstrous sea creatures, the Straw Hats discover the fallen ship has come from an island high in the sky. Unsure of how to reach it, the Straw Hats visit a nearby port on the island of Jaya. There they meet Bellamy, a pirate who looks down on Luffy, and mocks his dreams of becoming Pirate King. Luffy, who had promised Nami not to fight in the town, allows himself to be beaten up and bullied by Bellamy. The Straw Hats then proceed to another part of Jaya to meet a man who might have a lead on how to reach the sky island. However, they must first get past Masira's brother Shoujou and his crew.
25	The 100 Million Berry Man; Ichioku no Otoko (一億の男)	September 4, 2002; 4-08-873313-4	January 5, 2010; 1-4215-2846-0
227. "Noland the Liar" (うそつきノーランド, "Usotsuki Nōrando"); 228. "Mont Blanc Cricket, the Last Boss of the Monkey Mountain Allied Force" (「猿山連合軍最終園長」モンブラン・クリケット, "'Saruyama Rengō-gun Rasuto Bosu' Monburan Kuriketto"); 229. "Let's Eat" (メシを食おう, "Meshi o Kuou"); 230. "Pursue the South Bird!" (サウスバードを追え!!, "Sausubādo o Oe!!"); 231. "Bellamy the Hyena" (ハイエナのベラミー, "Haiena no Beramī"); 232. "The 100 Million Berry Man" (一億の男, "Ichioku no Otoko"); 233. "The World's Greatest Power" (世界最高権力, "Sekai Saikō Kenryoku"); 234. "Please Remember" (ご記憶下さいます様に, "Gokioku Kudasaimasu Yō ni"); 235. "The Knock Up Stream" (突き上げる海流, "Nokku Appu Sutorīmu"); 236. "The Ship Sails to the Sky" (船は空をゆく, "Fune wa Sora o Yuku")
The Straw Hats meet with Mont Blanc Cricket, a descendant of "Liar" Noland, famous for lying about a city of gold. But Cricket searches for evidence that can confirm that city's existence. Over the years he has come to believe that city, once a part of Jaya, was submerged at the bottom of the sea. If the Straw Hats want to reach the sky island they will need to ride that same current, but must first locate a special bird that will help them find their way. While Luffy and company go searching for the bird, Bellamy attacks and robs Cricket in an attempt to crush his dreams of finding the island in the sky. Enraged to learn this, after returning with the bird, Luffy seeks out and defeats Bellamy to recover Cricket's belongings. Cricket thanks him, and the Straw Hats leave to ride the current to Skypiea.
26	Adventure on Kami's Island; Kami no Shima no Bōken (神の島の冒険)	December 4, 2002; 4-08-873336-3	January 5, 2010; 1-4215-3442-8
237. "High in the Sky" (上空にて, "Jōkū nite"); 238. "Heaven's Gate" (天国の門, "Tengoku no Mon"); 239. "Angel Beach" (エンジェルビーチ, "Enjeru Bīchi"); 240. "Dial Power" (ダイアル・エネルギー, "Daiaru Enerugī"); 241. "Heaven's Judgment" (天の裁き, "Ten no Sabaki"); 242. "Class-2 Criminals" (第2級犯罪者, "Dainikyū Hanzaisha"); 243. "Trial" (試練, "Shiren"); 244. "S.O.S. (SOS)"; 245. "Adventure on Kami's Island" (神の島の冒険, "Kami no Shima no Bōken"); 246. "Satori, Vassal of the Forest of No Return" (迷いの森の神官サトリ, "Mayoi no Mori no Shinkan Satori")
The Straw Hats successfully reach the cloud harboring a cloud sea, and soon after their arrival meet some of its inhabitants: a hostile group of apparently primitive natives, and a friendlier people of the more civilized town of Angel Island. While the rest of Straw Hats mingle with them, learning of the town's history, and enjoying its unique technology, the ship's navigator Nami explores the endless sea of clouds. She finds Skypiea, but learns that the Straw Hats have been labeled as trespassers and will be dealt with accordingly. Although able to fend off an initial arrest attempt, their ship, and some of the crew, is taken away by Eneru, the current god of all that lies atop the cloud. Free, but wishing to reunite with their friends, Luffy, Sanji, and Usopp enter Skypiea, Eneru's domain.
27	Overture; Ōbāchua (序曲)	February 4, 2003; 4-08-873379-7	January 5, 2010; 1-4215-3443-6
247. "Ball Challenge" (玉の試練, "Tama no Shiren"); 248. "Former Kami vs. Vassal" (元神様VS神官, "Moto Kami-sama Bāsasu Shinkan"); 249. "The Village Hidden in the Cloud" (雲隠れの村, "Kumogakure no Mura"); 250. "Ball Dragon" (玉ドラゴン, "Tama Doragon"); 251. "Overture" (序曲, "Ōbāchua"); 252. "Junction"; 253. "Varse" (ヴァース, "Vāsu"); 254. "Aubade" (夜明曲, "Ōbādo"); 255. "The Anaconda and the Search Team" (うわばみと探索組, "Uwabami to Tansaku Chīmu")
Upon entering Skypiea they incite the wrath of Eneru's four priests. As Luffy and company deal with one of the four, the "captured" crew is forced to fight a second of Eneru's priests. They are saved by his predecessor, Ganfor, who is only able to make the priest leave after being defeated. Elsewhere, Luffy is able to defeat the first priest, and soon afterward reunites with his crew. After Ganfor is healed, he tells them of a city of gold hidden somewhere in Skypiea. To make themselves rich, the Straw Hats go looking for the gold, only to find themselves in the middle of a war between Eneru and the Shandians, the natives of Skypiea.
28	Wyper the Berserker "Senki" Waipā (「戦鬼」ワイパー)	May 1, 2003; 4-08-873418-1	January 5, 2010; 1-4215-3444-4
256. "Wyper the Berserker" (「戦鬼」ワイパー, "'Senki' Waipā"); 257. "Dial Battle" (貝バトル, "Daiaru Batoru"); 258. "The Many Souths" (いろんな南, "Iron na Minami"); 259. "Pirate Zoro vs. Warrior Braham" (海賊ゾロVS戦士ブラハム, "Kaizoku Zoro Bāsasu Senshi Burahamu"); 260. "Pirate Luffy vs. Berserker Wyper" (海賊ルフィVS戦鬼ワイパー, "Kaizoku Rufi Bāsasu Senki Waipā"); 261. "Warrior Genbo vs. Heavenly Warriors Commander Yama" (戦士ゲンボウvs神兵長ヤマ, "Senshi Genbō Bāsasu Shinpeichō Yama"); 262. "Pirate Chopper vs. Vassal Gedatsu" (海賊チョッパーVS神官ゲダツ, "Kaizoku Choppā Bāsasu Shinkan Gedatsu"); 263. "Pirate Nami and the Weird Knight vs. Heavenly Warriors Subcommanders Hotori and Kotori" (海賊ナミと変な騎士VS副神兵長ホトリとコトリ, "Kaizoku Nami to Hen na Kishi Bāsasu Fukushinpeichō Hotori to Kotori"); 264. "Warrior Kamakiri vs. Kami Eneru" (戦士カマキリVS神・エネル, "Senshi Kamakiri Bāsasu Goddo Eneru")
With the war's start, Eneru decides to make a bet: of the eighty-one combatants currently on Skypiea (the Straw Hats, the Shandians, and his own forces), only five will remain in three hours' time. The Shandians engage Eneru's forces, the remaining priests fight the Shandians, and the Straw Hats fight whoever is left. After two hours, the number of active combatants dwindles to twenty-five. Luffy mistakes a giant snake's mouth for a cave.
29	Oratorio 聖譚曲	July 4, 2003; 4-08-873480-7	February 2, 2010; 1-4215-3445-2
265. "Pirate Robin vs. Heavenly Warriors Commander Yama" (海賊ロビンVS神兵長ヤマ, "Kaizoku Robin Bāsasu Shinpeichō Yama"); 266. "Pirate Chopper vs. Vassal Ohm" (海賊チョッパーVS神官オーム, "Kaizoku Choppā Bāsasu Shinkan Ōmu"); 267. "March" (行進曲, "Māchi"); 268. "Suite" (組曲, "Suwīto"); 269. "Concerto" (協奏曲, "Koncheruto"); 270. "Serenade" (小夜曲, "Serenāde"); 271. "Pirate Zoro vs. Vassal Ohm" (海賊ゾロVS神官オーム, "Kaizoku Zoro Bāsasu Shinkan Ōmu"); 272. "Play" (戯曲, "Purei"); 273. "Quintet" (五重奏, "Kuintetto"); 274. "Oratorio" (聖譚曲); 275. "Divina Commedia" (神曲, "Dibīna Komeidia")
Having had a specific goal for becoming god, and with that goal now in sight, Eneru starts picking off the remaining combatants to complete his plans and ensure his prediction will be accurate. Those who remain (plus Luffy's snake-captor) are drawn into one big, final brawl. Meanwhile, Nico Robin locates the city of gold, only to find that all the gold is gone. The pieces begin to fall into place, and it is discovered that Eneru plans to destroy everyone who resides in the sky, while escaping to the seas below on his ship made of gold. With the five surviving "contestants" unaware of this, they engage Eneru (the sixth) in battle to see who will be excluded from his prediction. With his mastery over thunder, Eneru reduces the playing field to the promised five, but then decides that none of them is worthy of escaping with him to the blue seas.
30	Capriccio; Kapuritchio (狂想曲)	October 3, 2003; 4-08-873502-1	February 2, 2010; 1-4215-3446-0
276. "Shandian Rhythm" ("Shandia Rhythm"); 277. "Maxim" (箴言, "Makushimu"); 278. "Conis" (コニス, "Konisu"); 279. "Pirate Luffy vs. Kami Eneru" (海賊ルフィVS神・エネル, "Kaizoku Rufi Bāsasu Goddo Eneru"); 280. "Floating" (浮上, "Fujō"); 281. "Deathpiea" (デスピア, "Desupia"); 282. "Desire" (望み, "Nozomi"); 283. "On the Front Line of Rescuing Love" (恋の救出前線, "Koi no Kyūshutsu Zensen"); 284. "Sorry" (悪ィな, "Warī na"); 285. "Capriccio" (狂想曲, "Kapuritchio")
To save her own skin, Nami convinces Eneru to take her with him. They leave for the golden ship, leaving the defeated combatants to their fate. After Luffy escapes from the giant snake, and learns what Eneru has done to his crew, he goes to meet Skypiea's god in battle. Although initially confident that he can beat Luffy, Eneru soon finds that he is no match for the Straw Hat captain: Luffy's rubber body makes him immune to all of Eneru's lighting attacks. Rather than fight, Eneru traps Luffy in a prison of gold and throws him overboard, expecting the gold's weight to keep him away. Eneru sets sail and prepares to destroy the island in the sky. He is briefly impeded in his efforts by the remaining Straw Hats, Usopp and Sanji, giving the inhabitants of Angel Island, who have learned of Eneru's plans, time to evacuate.
31	We'll Be Here; Koko ni Iru (ここにいる)	December 19, 2003; 4-08-873551-X	February 2, 2010; 1-4215-3447-9
286. "The Shandoran Demon" (シャンドラの魔物, "Shandora no Mamono"); 287. "Kami Killing" (神殺し, "Kamigoroshi"); 288. "Curse" (祟り, "Tatari"); 289. "Full Moon" (望月, "Bōgetsu"); 290. "The Light of Shandora" (シャンドラの灯, "Shandora no Hi"); 291. "We'll Be Here" (ここにいる, "Koko ni Iru"); 292. "To Meet, like the Half-Moon Hidden by Clouds" (あふことは片われ月の雲隠れ, "Au Koto wa Katawarezuki no Kumogakure"); 293. "Bolero" (舞曲, "Borero"); 294. "Kingdom Come" (雷迎, "Raigō"); 295. "Giant Jack" (巨大豆蔓, "Jaianto Jakku")
In a flashback, Montblanc Noland, Cricket's ancestor, arrives on Jaya. He finds the early Shandians, who are being plagued by a terrible disease. After curing them a friendship is formed, and although Noland is forced to return to his homeland, the Shandians promise to help them meet again by ringing a special golden bell. Soon afterwards the part of Jaya, later known as Skypiea, is launched into the sky, and the inhabitants of Angel Island expels the Shandians from Skypiea. In the present, the Shandians continue to fight to reclaim the bell that will reunite them with Noland, not knowing he has long since been executed for "lying" about the location of the city of gold. Wishing to ring the bell to let Cricket know that the city of gold exists, Luffy unites all the people of the sky against Eneru.
32	Love Song; Rabu Songu (島の歌声)	March 4, 2004; 4-08-873571-4	February 2, 2010; 1-4215-3448-7
296. "Ultimate Sky Situation" (最空局面, "Saikū Kyokumen"); 297. "Praise of the Earth" (大地讃称, "Daichi Sanshō"); 298. "Love Song" (島の歌声, "Rabu Songu"); 299. "Fantasia" (幻想曲, "Fantajia"); 300. "Symphony" (交響曲, "Shinfonī"); 301. "I Hereby Guide..." (我ここに至る, "Ware Koko ni Itaru"); 302. "Finale" (最終楽章, "Fināre"); 303. "The Wealthy Pirate Gang" (金持ち海賊団, "Kanemochi Kaizoku-dan"); 304. "Long Island Adventure" (長い島の冒険, "Nagai Shima no Bōken"); 305. "Foxy the Silver Fox" (銀ギツネのフォクシー, "Gingitsune no Fokushī")
With the destruction of the sea of clouds almost complete, Luffy is finally able to reach and defeat Eneru, saving Skypiea and all its inhabitants. As Eneru falls, Luffy rings the golden bell confirming Skypiea's existence for Cricket, and ending the Shandians' reasons for fighting with Angel Island. The two sides live together on Skypiea, Ganfor reclaims his position as god, and Eneru escapes the clouds to explore the earth outside. The Straw Hats, having become saviors again, secretly flee once more. This time they take pillaged treasures, unaware that the Shandians wish to offer them much more, and return to the blue seas. They eventually arrive on an island where they meet Foxy, who challenges them to a competition among pirates.
33	Davy Back Fight; Davy Back Fight!!	June 4, 2004; 4-08-873593-5	February 2, 2010; 1-4215-3449-5
306. "Donut Race!" (ドーナツレース!!, "Dōnatsu Rēsu!!"); 307. "Ready, Set, Donut!" (レディ〜イ ドーナツ!!, "Redi~i Dōnatsu!!"); 308. "Obstructive Tactics" (妨害大作戦, "Bōgai Daisakusen"); 309. "Groggy Monsters" (グロッキーモンスターズ, "Gurokkī Monsutāzu"); 310. "Groggy Ring!!" (グロッキーリング!!, "Gurokkī Ringu!!"); 311. "Rough Game" (ラフゲーム, "Rafu Gēmu"); 312. "Goal!!"; 313. "Main Event"; 314. "Combat!!" (コンバット!!!, "Konbatto!!!"); 315. "Secret Room" (秘密の部屋, "Himitsu no Heya"); 316. "Brother Soul" (ブラザー魂, "Burazā Sōru")
The rules of the competition are simple: Foxy's crew and the Straw Hats will face each other in three rounds. Whoever wins a round gets to have someone from the opposing team join their crew, or take the other team's pirate flag. Foxy wins Tony Tony Chopper in a race around the island, but the Straw Hats win Chopper back in a game of dodge ball. Luffy and Foxy face each other in the final round of boxing, which evolves into a battle between Luffy's rubber abilities and Foxy's time-stopping power.
34	The City of Water, Water Seven "Mizu no Miyako" Wōtā Sebun (「水の都」ウォーターセブン)	August 4, 2004; 4-08-873638-9	March 2, 2010; 1-4215-3450-9
317. "K.O."; 318. "Closure" (閉会, "Heikai"); 319. "Admiral Aokiji of the Navy Headquarters" (海軍本部「大将」青キジ, "Kaigun Honbu 'Taishō' Aokiji"); 320. "Ultimate Military Force" (最高戦力, "Saikō Senryoku"); 321. "One-on-One" (一騎打ち, "Ikkiuchi"); 322. "Puffing Tom" (パッフィング・トム, "Paffingu Tomu"); 323. "The City of Water, Water Seven" (「水の都」ウォーターセブン, "'Mizu no Miyako' Wōtā Sebun"); 324. "Adventures in the City on the Water" (水上都市の冒険, "Suijō Toshi no Bōken"); 325. "The Franky Family" (フランキー一家, "Furankī Ikka"); 326. "Mr. Iceberg" (アイスバーグさん, "Aisubāgu-san"); 327. "Shipbuilding Island, Repair Dock No. 1" (造船島造船工場1番ドック, "Zōsenjima Zōsenkōjō Ichiban Dokku")
Luffy wins! Uninterested in any member of Foxy's crew, but not wishing to take their honor, Luffy replaces Foxy's flag with a new (and poorly drawn) one. Foxy sets sail swearing revenge, and the Marine admiral Aokiji introduces himself to the Straw Hats. Recognizing the threat they might pose to the Marines, before leaving, Aokiji encases Robin, with whom he has some history, and Luffy in ice. After they recover, the Straw Hats continue to the city of Water Seven in search of someone who can repair their ship, the Going Merry. They explore the city, have the loot they took from Skypiea appraised, and have Galley-La, a team of shipwrights, look at their ship. Though willing to pay any price to repair the Merry, the damage it sustained during their adventures is too great to be fixed.
35	Captain; Kyaputen (船長)	November 4, 2004; 4-08-873667-2	March 2, 2010; 1-4215-3451-7
328. "The Pirate Abduction Incident" (海賊誘拐事件, "Kaizoku Yūkai Jiken"); 329. "My Name Is Franky" (おれの名は「フランキー」, "Ore no Na wa 'Furankī'"); 330. "It's Decided" (決めた, "Kimeta"); 331. "The Big Argument" (大喧嘩, "Ōgenka"); 332. "Luffy vs. Usopp" (ルフィVSウソップ, "Rufi Bāsasu Usoppu"); 333. "Captain" (船長, "Kyaputen"); 334. "Big Trouble in the Secret Room" (密室の大事件, "Misshitsu no Daijiken"); 335. "Warning"; 336. "Luffy vs. Franky" (ルフィVSフランキー, "Rufi Bāsasu Furankī")
Luffy reluctantly decides to abandon the ship. Usopp, having grown attached to the Merry, is unwilling to take this course of action and challenges Luffy's captaincy. Once defeated, Usopp decides to leave the Straw Hats, and the others go searching for a new ship. Meanwhile, the Aqua Laguna, an annual storm that strikes Water Seven, is about to return. To coincide with this Iceburg, the owner of Galley-La, is attacked, and Nico Robin is labeled as the prime suspect. Knowing Robin is a member of the Straw Hats, all of Water Seven turns against them.
36	The Ninth Justice; Kyūbanme no Seigi (9番目の正義)	February 4, 2005; 4-08-873768-7	March 2, 2010; 1-4215-3452-5
337. "Protectors of the City of Water" (「水の都」の用心棒, "'Mizu no Miyako' no Yōjinbō"); 338. "Coup de Vent" (風来砲, "Kū do Van"); 339. "Rumors" (うわさ, "Uwasa"); 340. "The Woman Who Brings Darkness" (闇を引く女, "Yami o Hiku Onna"); 341. "Demon" (悪魔, "Akuma"); 342. "The Messenger of Darkness" (闇の使者, "Yami no Shisha"); 343. "Cipher Pol No. 9"; 344. "Opposing Force" (抵抗勢力, "Teikō Seiryoku"); 345. "Sleepers" (潜伏者, "Senpukusha"); 346. "The Ninth Justice" (9番目の正義, "Kyūbanme no Seigi")
The Straw Hats are on the run and Robin is nowhere to be found. In order to determine where her allegiances lie, the Straw Hats decide to break into Galley-La's headquarters to find her. To their surprise, they are not the only ones laying siege to Galley-La; a masked group has already infiltrated the headquarters looking for the blueprints to the ancient weapon Pluton. After finding the blueprints and discovering that they are fake, the masked individuals approach the recovering Iceburg. They remove their disguises, revealing themselves as Robin and some of the workers of Galley-La. Members of the secret government organization, Cipher Pol #9, they joined Galley-La to gain Pluton for the government's use. After speaking with Iceberg, they learn that the real blueprints are with Franky, a shipwright and friend of Iceberg.
37	Tom; Tomu-san (トムさん)	April 28, 2005; 4-08-873802-0	March 2, 2010; 1-4215-3453-3
347. "Six Powers" (六式, "Roku Shiki"); 348. "Fighting Power" (戦闘力, "Sentōryoku"); 349. "Ordinary Citizens" (一市民, "Ichi Shimin"); 350. "The Warehouse Under the Bridge" (橋の下倉庫, "Hashi no Shita Sōko"); 351. "Klabautermann" (クラバウターマン, "Kurabautāman"); 352. "Tom's Workers" (トムズ ワーカーズ, "Tomuzu Wākāzu"); 353. "The Legendary Shipwright" (伝説の船大工, "Densetsu no Funadaiku"); 354. "Sea Train" (海列車, "Umi Ressha"); 355. "Spandam" (スパンダム, "Supandamu"); 356. "Mr. Tom" (トムさん, "Tomu-san"); 357. "Cutty Flam" (カティ・フラム, "Kati Furamu")
The Straw Hats arrive on the scene and find Robin with CP9. Although she claims to want nothing more to do with them, Luffy and company attack CP9 so that they can talk to her. They are quickly defeated, and CP9 departs to look for Franky. As the Aqua Laguna approaches, Franky has given Usopp and the Merry shelter. Soon enough CP9 arrives looking for Franky and his blueprints. Because his teacher, entrusted him with the blueprints years earlier, and forfeited his own life to insure Pluton never fell into the government's hands, Franky refuses to reveal their location.
38	Rocketman!! Rokettoman!! (ロケットマン!!)	July 4, 2005; 4-08-873839-X	March 2, 2010; 1-4215-3454-1
358. "Reactivation" (復活, "Fukkatsu"); 359. "Bingo" (ビンゴ); 360. "Departing Soon" (まもなく出航, "Mamonaku Shukkō"); 361. "P.S." (追伸, "Tsuishin"); 362. "Ebb Tide" (引き潮, "Hikishio"); 363. "Aqua Laguna" (アクア・ラグナ, "Akua Raguna"); 364. "Kokoro" (ココロ); 365. "Rocketman!!" (ロケットマン!!, "Rokettoman!!"); 366. "Sortie!" (出撃!!, "Shutsugeki!!"); 367. "Sniper King" (そげキング, "Sogekingu")
After the Straw Hats recover from their injuries they discover that Robin has sided with the government in order to save the rest of the crew from destruction. CP9 captures Franky and Usopp and takes them and Robin to Enies Lobby, the government's judiciary island, using a sea train. Sanji sneaks on board in an effort to save them, freeing Usopp and Franky before continuing on to Robin. The rest of the Straw Hats, the loyal members of Galleyla, and Franky's friends, follow on a sea train of their own, unimpeded by the Aqua Laguna.
39	Scramble; Sōdatsusen (争奪戦)	November 4, 2005; 4-08-873872-1	April 6, 2010; 1-4215-3455-X
368. "Sea Train Battle Game" (海列車バトルゲーム, "Umi Ressha Batoru Gēmu"); 369. "Ramen Kung Fu" (ラーメン拳法, "Rāmen Kenpō"); 370. "You're Not Alone" (一人じゃない, "Hitori ja Nai"); 371. "The Honorable Captain T-Bone" (天晴Tボーン大佐, "Appare Tī-Bōn Taisa"); 372. "Plastic Surgery" (パラージュ, "Parāju"); 373. "Necessary Evil" (必要悪, "Hitsuyō Aku"); 374. "Scramble" (争奪戦, "Sōdatsusen"); 375. "The Supermen of Enies Lobby" (エニエス・ロビーの超人達, "Eniesu Robī no Chōjintachi"); 376. "I Got It!!" (わかった!!!, "Wakatta!!!"); 377. "The Big Showdown on the Judicial Island" (司法の島の大決戦!!, "Shihō no Shima no Daikessen!!")
As they move through the train looking for Robin, Sanji, Usopp, and Franky deal with the lesser members of Cipher Pol. Although they find her, Robin does not allow herself to be saved. CP9 captures Franky again, kicks Sanji and Usopp from the train, and continues on to Enies Lobby. Sanji and Usopp wait along the tracks, and reunite with Luffy and the others when they go by. They arrive at the judiciary island soon after CP9 does and engage the forces of the world government in order to get Robin back.
40	Gear; Gia (ギア)	December 26, 2005; 4-08-874003-3	April 6, 2010; 1-4215-3456-8
378. "Casualties" (被害状況, "Higai Jōkyō"); 379. "Power Level" (道力, "Dōriki"); 380. "Enies Lobby Main Island Express" (エニエス・ロビー本島行き急行便, "Eniesu Robī Hontō Yuki Ekusupuresu"); 381. "Fired" (クビ, "Kubi"); 382. "Demon Lair" (鬼の隠れ家, "Oni no Kakurega"); 383. "Luffy vs. Blueno" (ルフィVSブルーノ, "Rufi Bāsasu Burūno"); 384. "Signal the Counterattack" (反撃ののろしを上げろ, "Hangeki no Noroshi o Agero"); 385. "There Is a Way" (道はある, "Michi wa Aru"); 386. "Unprecedented" (前代未聞, "Zendai Mimon"); 387. "Gear" (ギア, "Gia"); 388. "Gear Two" (ギア2, "Gia Sekando")
The Straw Hats lay waste to Enies Lobby, defeating anyone who tries to keep them from Robin. As the rest of the crew deals with the less formidable guardians of the island, Luffy goes ahead and calls out to CP9. Only one member of CP9, Blueno, agrees to fight him, remembering how quickly Luffy was defeated in their last encounter. As the battle progresses Luffy demonstrates his ability to use one of CP9's abilities. After using his "Gear Two" and before demonstrating his "Gear Three", Luffy defeats Blueno and calls out to Robin that he is there to rescue her.

== Lists of main series chapters ==
- List of One Piece chapters 1 to 186
- List of One Piece chapters 389 to 594
- List of One Piece chapters 595 to 806
- List of One Piece chapters 807 to 1015
- List of One Piece chapters 1016 to now

== See also ==
- List of One Piece media
