= Franky (One Piece) =

One Piece franchise fictional character

- One Piece character
- Franky illustrated by Eiichiro Oda
- First appearance: One Piece chapter 329: "My Name Is "Franky" (Weekly Shōnen Jump No. 34, July 17, 2004)
- Created by: Eiichiro Oda
- Voiced by: Japanese; Kazuki Yao (2005–24); Junko Noda (young); Subaru Kimura (2025 onwards); English; Patrick Seitz; Terri Doty (young); Greg Ayres (young, Unlimited Adventure)
- Birthday: March 9

In-universe information
- Full name: Franky (Note: Franky (フランキー, Furankī)); Cutty Flam (Note: Cutty Flam (カティー・フラム, Kati Furamu)) (born name)
- Aliases: Franosuke (Note: Franosuke (フラの介, Furanosuke)) "Cyborg" Franky (Note: サイボーグ フランキー (Saibōgu Furankī))
- Relatives: Tom (foster father); Iceburg (foster brother); Scien (father)
- Affiliations: Straw Hat Crew (currently); Franky Family (formerly); Tom's Workers (formerly)
- Occupation: Pirate; Shipwright; Bounty hunter (former); Ship dismantler (former)
- Age: 34 (debut); 36 (after the timeskip)
- Bounties: 394,000,000 (current); 94,000,000 (second); 44,000,000 (first)

Franky (Japanese: フランキー, Hepburn: Furankī) also known by his moniker "Cyborg" Franky, is a fictional character in the One Piece franchise created by Eiichiro Oda. The character made his first appearance in the 329th chapter of the series, which was first published in Japan in Shueisha's Weekly Shōnen Jump magazine on July 17, 2004. He is the eighth member of the Straw Hat Crew and the seventh to join, serving as their shipwright.

Abandoned by his parents at age ten, Cutty Flam (カティ・フラム, Kati Furamu) changed his name to Franky (フランキー, Furankī) and is taken in as an apprentice by shipwright Tom, who built Pirate King Gold Roger's ship, the Oro Jackson, and also secretly holds the plans for a devastating ancient weapon.^{[ch. 344, 354, 427]} Franky's recklessness eventually provides an opportunity for World Government agents seeking these plans.^{[ch. 356]} Attempting to rescue his master, Franky suffers severe injuries and only survives by rebuilding parts of his body using pieces of scrap metal, turning himself into a cola-powered cyborg with strength.^{[ch. 336, 339, 352, 357f.]} After gaining notoriety as "Cyborg" Franky (サイボーグ フランキー, Saibōgu Furankī), and to fulfill his dream of sailing a ship he built around the world, he constructs the Thousand Sunny, a brigantine-rigged sloop-of-war, for the Straw Hat Crew and joins them.^{[ch. 435–437]}

In the anime television series, his voice actor is Kazuki Yao. In December 2024, it was announced Yao would be retiring from the role and was replaced by Subaru Kimura the following year, following the end of the anime's six-month hiatus. Patrick Seitz provides his voice in the Funimation English adaptation.

== Creation and conception ==
Franky's original design shared a lot in common with the character of Popeye the Sailor. Both of them possess large tattooed forearms and gain energy and power boosts after consuming specific foods and drinks. Franky recharges his energy by drinking cola from glass bottles which he stashes inside a makeshift fridge from within his body. Franky is one of the six Straw Hats who doesn't possess any devil fruit powers, along with Zoro, Nami, Usopp, Sanji & Jimbei.

One Piece creator Eiichiro Oda was once asked by a fan about the nationalities of each of the members in the Straw Hat Crew if One Piece was set in the real world, responding that Franky would be American.

=== Appearance ===
Franky is a very tall male (close to 225 cm, or 7 foot 5 inches) with light teal-blue hair which he can freely shapeshift depending on what kind of aliment he consumes, due to his cyborg abilities. During his childhood years, he possessed a normal physique which he has slowly technologically modified in time. In his adulthood, he has a slightly unusual muscular build as a direct result of the modifications that he conducted upon himself, with a large torso and forearms compared to which his biceps are significantly smaller. After timeskip, Franky's body mostly consists of robotic modifications easy to spot on his shoulders, forearms and legs.

He typically dresses himself in swimming trunks, which is why people think that he is a pervert and have come to name him so, and an unbuttoned loud Hawaiian 'Aloha' shirt over a huge gold chain around his neck. Rarely does he ever button up his shirt, put on long sleeved clothes or even wear pants and shoes unless it's the right thing to wear, or by order of someone else. He also doesn't like anyone changing him to any other appearances like when Nami's soul was inside him and she tried to close the buttons in his Aloha Shirt, fact which annoyed him very much.

=== Personality ===
Franky can also be described as a pervert and exhibitionist. He is a resolute, weird, independent man with frequent disregard for rules and traditions. Nevertheless, his behavior is strange and comical. He has proven to be among the most matured and trusted Straw Hats by trying to make his younger comrades laugh while thinking of important things at back of his mind. This honest attitude makes him find friends even in the most unlikely places such as street urchins or pirates. Many people admire Franky for being a brotherly-like figure ("Aniki") who looks out for them.

While speaking, Franky's catchphrase of "Super!" (スーパー, Sūpā) would follow suit. At this point he leans over to one side while bending his knee towards it. The other leg is straight but pointing towards the opposite direction. Then he throws his head backwards, after which his arms come over his head until they are locked together wrist-to-wrist. When they combine into one star, two separate star tattoos come together into one shape. Sometimes there may be some kind of light or explosion accompanying it like a special effect. Similarly, another feature that differentiates him from others is repeated use of the word "Yosh" (meaning alright in Japanese) during speech as well as shouting "AOW!" to express excitement and boastfulness.

=== Abilities ===
Franky is a human with cyborg enhancements. His front side is heavily resistant to various kinds of attacks while his back, which is harder for him to defend, remains susceptible. He boasts an array of weapons integrated into his body such as rocket launchers, extendable arms, or the ability to exhale flames and the capacity to unleash strong gusts of wind from various parts of his body. His abdomen features a refrigerated compartment that can store up to three cola bottles for sustenance and empowerment. Franky's demeanor can be influenced by the type of beverage stocked in his fridge. By consuming quantities of cola at once he can unleash bursts of air from his arms employing this technique in maneuvers, like the impactful "Coup de Vent".

Due to the bionic modifications he has done to his body over time, Franky possesses superhuman strength. His years as a shipwright, as well as a pre-pirate bounty hunter, have contributed greatly to his physical strength. He's capable of overpowering fully-grown rampaging animals.

In addition to his strength, Franky also displays great skill at anything he puts his hand to, in or out of combat. He is a master craftsman, formerly working as a first-rate shipwright and carpenter under Tom.

==== Inventions and equipment ====
Due to being a skilled craftsman, Franky is an avid collector of strong machinery equipment. Besides the modifications of his very own body, Franky created a variety of vehicles which himself and the rest of the Straw Hats can use during battles such as the Shiro Mokuba I (an automatic waver), the Mini Merry II (a shopping boat created in the memory of "Going Merry", the Straw Hats' first ship), the Shark Submerge III (a submarine), the Kurosai FR-U IV (a motorcycle Franky often uses), and the Brachio Tank V, a terrestrial three-person tank usually operated by Usopp, Tony Tony Chopper and one more crewmember. During the story of the series, Franky combines several of the previous machines into a gigantic and powerful robot known by the name of "General Franky". The Straw Hats are often fascinated by Franky's creations as their eyes turn into shining stars when he presents them his latest inventions.

Besides his combat machinery, Franky is mainly known for building Thousand Sunny, the Straw Hats' second ship after the destruction of the Going Merry. He designed the ship as a brigantine and crafted it using Adam Wood, the same material from which former pirate king Gold Roger's ship Oro Jackson was built.

==== Radical beam ====
Franky often uses the "Radical Beam", a laser type of attack similar with what various villainous characters such as Kaido and Seraphims use. He has mastered the skill during the timeskip while he worked in Dr. Vegapunk's laboratory and used it in several of his direct duels against main villains such as CP-9 agents and even ex-yonko Big Mom.

== Appearances ==
=== One Piece manga ===
Franky was born in the South Blue as "Cutty Flam" to the pirate Queen and an unnamed mother. When he reached the age of ten, his parents abandoned him by throwing him overboard of their ship into the ocean. He was then rescued by Tom, the main shipwright of Water 7 and creator of the Oro Jackson ship. Shortly after, the latter took Franky as his apprentice due to observing his handy craft skills. After Franky proclaiming that one day he would build his dream ship, Tom encouraged him by stating that if he does it, he would definitely surpass him.

After Tom was sentenced to death by Spandam and the CP-5 agents who were after the blueprints of ancient weapon Pluton, Franky was handed the blueprints and succeeded in keeping them from being stolen by the World Government even after he was run down by Water 7's train he built alongside Tom's shipwright crew. Severely injured, Franky was on the verge of death, but hardly survived. This was the moment when he started "fixing" himself by adding his infamous cyborg body parts. Later on, Iceburg suggested him to leave Water 7 with the blueprints so they would never be found. Franky refused and remained on the island as he created his own villainous crew, "The Franky Family".

After four years, he encounters the Straw Hats who were visiting Water 7. After short confrontations against his future crew, Franky joins them in the battle against The Marines and CP-9 agents from the Enies Lobby, having taken the chance for retaliation against Spandam. With help from Galley-La, Franky constructs the Thousand Sunny, a brigantine-rigged sloop-of-war. Franky then accepts Luffy's offer to join the Straw Hats, leaving Water 7 in the hands of Iceburg and Galley-La Company members. He received his first bounty with a total of 44,000,000.^{[ch. 435–437]}

When the crew got separated before timeskip, Franky landed on the Karakuri island, where he worked in Dr. Vegapunk's laboratory to develop his crafting ability and technology knowledge. On the island of Dressrosa he fought alongside the Straw Hats to defeat Doflamingo's family, earning himself his second bounty of 94,000,000.^{[ch. 435]} Following the Raid of Onigishima, his bounty later got increased to 394,000,000.^{[ch. 1051]} Franky becomes recognized as one of Emperor of the Sea Monkey D. Luffy's Senior Officers.^{[ch. 1058]}

=== In other media ===
Franky made his first video game appearance in One Piece: Unlimited Adventure (2007), and has continued to appear in every subsequent One Piece licensed video game to date.

== Reception ==
Franky ranked in the Top 30 of several Shōnen Jump character popularity polls, making it to the 28th position at his best. On November 21, 2020, a life-size bronze statue of Franky was erected in front of Takamori Station (Takamori Town, Aso District) as part of the "Straw Hat Pirates: Hino Country Reconstruction Arc", a reconstruction project following the 2016 Kumamoto earthquakes. Payton Otterdahl struck Franky's signature pose and said his signature "SUPER" phrase during the 2020 Summer Olympics.

Deni Sahbegovic of Comic Book Resources ranked ten of the best episodes in which Franky took part in the main action. Based on the anime plot, it was noted that his character has been shaped around bravery and justice as he equally defended Nico Robin from the persecutions made by the World Government and CP-9 agents upon her very own existence. The episode in which Franky tried to stop the train of Water 7 is a must-watch for any viewer looking to understand his motivations. The ultimate act of bravery made by Franky was burning the blueprints of the Ancient Weapon of Pluton in order to protect his own future from the government's wrath.

== See also ==
- Straw Hats
- List of One Piece characters

== Works cited ==
- Vol. 35 (ch. 328–336): Captain. March 2010. ISBN 978-1-4215-3451-0. and 船長 (in Japanese). November 2004. ISBN 978-4-08-873667-9.
- Vol. 36 (ch. 337–346): The Ninth Justice. March 2010. ISBN 978-1-4215-3452-7. and 9番目の正義 (in Japanese). February 2005. ISBN 978-4-08-873768-3.
- Vol. 37 (ch. 347–357): Tom. March 2010. ISBN 978-1-4215-3453-4. and トムさん (in Japanese). April 2005. ISBN 978-4-08-873802-4.
- Vol. 44 (ch. 420–430): Let's Go Back. May 2010. ISBN 978-1-4215-3460-2. and 帰ろう (in Japanese). December 2006. ISBN 978-4-08-874287-8.
- Vol. 45 (ch. 431–440): You Have My Sympathies. May 2010. ISBN 978-1-4215-3461-9. and 心中お察しする (in Japanese). March 2007. ISBN 978-4-08-874314-1.
