= List of One Piece films =

The cover of the first film's DVD release

Since the premiere of the anime adaptation of the manga series One Piece by Eiichiro Oda in 1999, Toei Animation has produced fifteen feature films based on the franchise traditionally released during the Japanese school spring break since 2000. Four of the films were originally shown as double features alongside other Toei film productions and thus have a running time below feature length (between 30 and 56 minutes). The first three films were shown at the Toei Anime Fair (東映アニメフェア, Toei Anime Fea) and the eleventh was released as part of Jump Heroes Film. The films generally use original storylines, but some adapt story arcs from the manga directly. With the release of films ten, twelve, thirteen, and fourteen, tie-in story arcs of the TV series were aired concurrently.

Additionally, three of these films have had special featurette shorts, showcasing the characters engaged in various activities unrelated to the series. There are also thirteen television specials that were broadcast on Fuji TV and two short films, which were shown at the 1998 Jump Super Anime Tour and 2008 Jump Super Anime Tour, respectively.

As with the franchise's anime television series, the eighth, tenth, twelfth, thirteenth, fourteenth, and fifteenth films have been licensed by Funimation/Crunchyroll and released in both subtitled and dubbed formats. Additionally, the first through seventh and ninth films have been released in the United Kingdom with English subtitles.

== Theatrical films ==
=== One Piece ===
One Piece (also known as One Piece: The Movie in some markets) is the first animated feature film of the franchise, starring Mayumi Tanaka as Monkey D. Luffy, Kazuya Nakai as Roronoa Zoro, Akemi Okamura as Nami, and Kappei Yamaguchi as Usopp. It premiered in Japan on March 4, 2000, and was released to DVD on January 21, 2001. The film was shown in a double bill with Digimon Adventure: Our War Game!. In the first week, the film attained second place in the Japanese box office, third place during their second week, and first place during the fourth and fifth weeks.

The legend of the Great Gold Pirate Woonan remains intact, years after his disappearance. Many pirates search for his mountain of gold hidden on a remote island, among them are Captain Eldoraggo and his men. By hunting down every member of Woonan's former crew, they eventually take possession of a map to that hidden island. On their way there, they meet and decide to rob the Straw Hat Pirates, who, still lacking a cook, are close to starvation. A short fight ensues, during which Luffy, Zoro, and Tobio, a boy who ran away from home to become part of Woonan's crew, are separated from the other Straw Hats and their ship, staying afloat on the shattered remains of what at some point was a boat. Following the scent of food, they quickly arrive at a floating oden bar, run by Tobio's grandfather, Ganzo. Eldoraggo and his crew land on Woonan's island, where they encounter Usopp, who, to evade being killed, convinces them that he is a professional treasure hunter, offers them his help, and using their map, starts leading them around. Meanwhile, somewhere else on the island, Zoro and Luffy, chained together for trying to eat-and-run, get lost and attempt to get back to the shore. With the help of Nami, Usopp gets away from the enemy crew. The Straw Hats meet up and take a closer look at the treasure map. They conclude that Woonan's treasure must be hidden on the island's only mountain and set out to climb it. On their way up, they meet Gonzo, who reveals to them that he and Woonan had grown up like brothers in the same village. Atop the mountain they find an empty house with a secret entry to a basement. Eldoraggo and his men arrive and are beaten by Luffy and Zoro. Then the group climbs into the basement. There, Woonan's skeleton is sitting in an empty room, a message for his old friend Gonzo written on the walls. With gold from Eldoraggo's ship, the Straw Hats set sail, resuming course for the Grand Line.

==== Characters introduced ====
- Tobio (トビオ): A young boy who wanted to find the legendary pirate Woonan and the grandson of Ganzo. Tobio is voiced by Yuka Imai in the original Japanese version.
- Ganzo (岩蔵, Ganzō): Tobio's grandfather who works as a chef at an oden stand in the sea. In his youth, he was a friend of Woonan. Ganzo is voiced by Takeshi Aono in the original Japanese version while Taiki Matsuno voices him in his youth.
- Eldoraggo Pirates (エルドラゴ海賊団, Erudorago Kaizoku-dan) are a pirate crew from the East Blue which consists of:
  - Eldoraggo (エルドラゴ, Erudorago): The captain of the Eldoraggo Pirates and the main antagonist of One Piece: The Movie. He has an obsession with gold and ate the Scream-Scream Fruit which enables him to generate sonic screams. He also appears as a boss in the video game One Piece: Become the Pirate King!. Eldoraggo is voiced by Kenji Utsumi in the original Japanese version.
  - Golass (ゴラス, Gorasu): A strong swordsman who works as a mercenary for Eldoraggo.
  - The Hyena Three (ハイエナ三人衆, Haiena San'ninshū): A group whose three members are Danny (ダニー, Danī), Denny (デニー, Denī), and Donny (ドニー, Donī), originally appearing as subordinates of Eldoraggo in One Piece: The Movie. After Eldoraggo's defeat, the Hyena Three later appear in Clockwork Island Adventure as members of the Trump Pirates. Respectively, in the original Japanese version Danny, Denny and Donny are voiced by Shinsuke Kasai, Toshihiro Itō, and Tsurumaru Sakai in One Piece: The Movie, and by Tetsu Inada, Osamu Ryūtani, and Hisayoshi Suganuma in Clockwork Island Adventure.
- Woonan (ウーナン, Ūnan): A legendary pirate who amassed great wealth in his lifetime, which led him to be known as the "Great Gold Pirate" (黄金の大海賊, Ōgon no Dai Kaizoku). In his youth, he was friends with Ganzo with whom he argued because while Ganzo dreamed of cooking oden, he wanted to live adventures. Woonan is voiced by Nachi Nozawa in the original Japanese version, while Takeshi Kusao voices him in his youth.

=== Clockwork Island Adventure ===
Clockwork Island Adventure is the second animated feature film of the franchise, the first to use digital ink and paint and the first to additionally star Hiroaki Hirata as Sanji. It premiered in Japan on March 3, 2001, and was released to DVD on October 21, 2001. The film was shown in a double bill with Digimon Adventure 02: Diaboromon Strikes Back. The film was shown along with a six-minute featurette short named Jango's Dance Carnival.

While the Straw Hats enjoy a warm day at the beach, their ship with all their equipment and weapons is stolen. They can do nothing but watch, as it disappears into the distance. A week later, dressed in cloth from a rental store for wedding ceremonies and riding a one-person paddle boat they set out to go after their lost belongings. At sea, they encounter the boy Akizu and the young man Borodo. The two call themselves the Thief Brothers and claim to be after a well-known treasure, called the Diamond Clock from Clockwork Island. Actually, they are the ones who stole the Straw Hats' ship and brought it to Clockwork Island to make the Straw Hats fight the Trump Siblings. The Trump Siblings Boo Jack, Honey Queen, Skunk One, Pin Joker, and Bear King (the leader), are another pirate crew who occupied Clockwork Island for years and forced its inhabitants to build weapons. A number of ships bearing the mark of the Trump Siblings appear and a short fight ensues, during which the Thief Brothers' ship is destroyed and Nami abducted. Using mere pieces of wood to stay afloat and an improvised sail for propulsion, the group manages to reach the foot of Clockwork Island. A long, circular staircase laced with deadly traps leads up to the actual island. There, Nami makes the acquaintance of the Trump Siblings' captain, Bear King. He takes a liking to her and decides to make her his bride. Eventually the Thief Brothers and the remaining Straw Hats make it to the end of the stairway and onto the main island. A beautiful landscape appears in front of them, but the island's citizens are in no mood to cherish it. Not knowing that Akizu is their son, a pair of them tells the group of the island's past. Then the heroes storm the Trump Siblings' stronghold, built around the island's key, which holds the island together. One after another, the Straw Hats get picked off and captured, until only Luffy remains. Once he reaches the stronghold's top and frees his crew, the movie climaxes in an all-out battle, during which the Trump Siblings are defeated and the island's key is destroyed. Clockwork Island crashes down into the ocean, but Akizu reunites with his family and the Straw Hats reclaim their ship.

==== Characters introduced ====
- Borodo (ボロード, Borōdo): A thief and the adoptive brother of Akisu. He ends up allying with the Straw Hat Pirates to defeat the Trump Pirates. Borodo is voiced by Kenyu Horiuchi in the original Japanese version.
- Akisu (アキース, Akīsu): A young boy who was adopted by Borodo as his little brother when he found him as a baby, and who works as a thief alongside him. Akisu is voiced by Akiko Yajima in the original Japanese version.
- The Trump Pirates (トランプ兄弟), whose officers are known as the Trump Siblings (トランプ兄弟, Toranpu Kyōdai), are a pirate crew from the East Blue themed after animals and playing cards. They consists of:
  - Bear King (ベアキング, Bea Kingu): The leader of the Trump Pirates, the ruler of Clockwork Island, and the main antagonist of Clockwork Island Adventure who wears a teddy bear-like hat. He ate the Hard-Hard Fruit which enables him to harden up his body and raise his body temperature. Bear King is voiced by Tesshō Genda in the original Japanese version.
  - Honey Queen (ハニークィーン, Hanī Kuīn): A bee-themed member of the Trump Pirates and part of the Trump Siblings. She ate the Liquid-Liquid Fruit which enables her to generate, control, and become an unknown liquid. Unlike the other Logia Devil Fruit users, Honey Queen leaves her clothes behind when she uses her powers. Honey Queen is voiced by Megumi Hayashibara in the original Japanese version.
  - Pin Joker (ピンジョーカー, Pin Jōkā): A jester-dressed kiwi-themed swordsman and member of the Trump Siblings who holds a grudge against Roronoa Zoro due to being defeated by him in the past. Pin Joker is voiced by Hideyuki Tanaka in the original Japanese version.
  - Boo Jack (ブージャック, Būjakku): A fat pig-themed member of the Trump Siblings. Boo jack is voiced by Isamu Tanonaka in the original Japanese version.
  - Skunk One (スカンクワン, Sukanku Wan): A skunk-themed member of the Trump Siblings who is dressed like an airplane pilot.
  - The Hyena Three are also members of the crew.

=== Chopper's Kingdom on the Island of Strange Animals ===
Chopper's Kingdom on the Island of Strange Animals is the third animated feature film of the franchise and the first to additionally star Ikue Ohtani as Tony Tony Chopper. It premiered in Japan on March 2, 2002, and was released to DVD on October 21, 2002. The film was shown in a double bill with Digimon Tamers: Runaway Locomon. From the first week, the film made a six-week run in the Top 10 of the Japanese box office, placing third in the first two weeks, fifth and fourth in the third and fourth weeks, respectively, and sixth in the fifth and sixth weeks. The film was shown along with a six-minute featurette short named Dream Soccer King!.

With Chopper as their newest member, the Straw Hats arrive at the Island of Strange Animals. Before they can land, a geyser-like fountain sends their ship flying. Chopper falls off and lands in the middle of a gathering of animals, where knows a boy called Mobanby. They are performing a ritual, which according to their legend, is supposed to cause a king to fall from the heavens. Believing that legend fulfilled, they proclaim Chopper their new king. The other Straw Hats, searching for their lost crewmate, make the acquaintance of the self-proclaimed genius and expert treasure hunter Count Butler, with his henchmen General Hot Dog and President Snake. Butler is in search of the horns of a particular animal living on the island, which when eaten bestows great power upon the eater. For that purpose, he uses a hoard of bovinae-like animals called horn eaters, which he controls by playing music on a special violin, to round up horn bearing animals. The Straw Hats, unknowingly, lead Butler to Chopper and the group of animals, whose king he has become. Butler gives the gathered animals an ultimatum, to hand over their king, whose horns he believes to be what he is looking for, or to be crushed by his horn eaters. But Chopper does not need to be turned over. He steps forward himself and lures the horn eaters away from the island's animals. A fight ensues and it does not take long until the remaining Straw Hats join in to take their fill. Zoro takes on Hot Dog and Sanji fights with Snake, while Usopp and Nami take care of the horn eaters. Butler fights with Chopper and is about to finish him off, when Momambi, a young boy and the only human inhabitant of the island, shows up with the former king's horns to lure Butler away from Chopper. The plan backfires, as Butler gets hold of the horns, quickly stuffs them down, and transforms into a large, horned, gorilla-like animal. With that he appears to be winning, until the island's animals and Luffy enter the fight. Luffy defeats Butler and breaks his horns, thus canceling his transformation, and sends him flying. Mobanby fears to be exiled from the island for losing the former king's horns but instead is elected the animal king.

==== Characters introduced ====
- Mobanby (モバンビー, Mobanbī): The only human living on the O-Kan Island, a young boy who was raised by Kirin Lion. Mobanby is voiced by Ai Orikasa in the original Japanese version.
- Karasuke (カラスケ): A large raven-like bird with glasses, and Mobanby's closest friend. Karasuke is voiced by Toshiko Fujita in the original Japanese version.
- Bald Parrot (ハゲオウム, Hage Ōmu): A wise large bird with green feathers and a bald spot on the top of his head. Bald Parrot is voiced by Takeshi Aono in the original Japanese version.
- Battler (バトラー, Batorā): A poacher who claims to be a genius zoologist, and the main antagonist of Chopper's Kingdom on the Island of Strange Animals. He search the Crowning Treasure horns on O-Kan Island to obtain their power. Battler is voiced by Masashi Ebara in the original Japanese version.
- Hotdog (ホットドッグ, Hottodoggu): One of Battler's henchmen. A burly, muscular man who fights hand-to-hand. Hotdog is voiced by Daisuke Gōri in the original Japanese version.
- Heaby (ヘビー, Hebī): One of Battler's henchmen. A man who fights with a sword which also transforms into a whip. Heaby is voiced by Tomokazu Seki in the original Japanese version.

=== Dead End Adventure ===
Dead End Adventure is the fourth animated feature film of the franchise and the first to additionally star Yuriko Yamaguchi as Nico Robin. It premiered in Japan on March 1, 2003, and was released to DVD on July 21, 2003. The film made a seven-week run in the Top 10 of the Japanese box office, placing second in its first week of showing, then fifth for two weeks, sixth for another two weeks, seventh in its sixth week, and tenth in its seventh week of showing.

In a port town pub, the once again flat broke Straw Hats witness a suspicious exchange between a customer and the proprietor. Nami immediately senses money and plans to convince the host to give her whatever information he had given him. The other Straw Hats join in and soon he is persuaded. He shows them to a backdoor, behind which they find a long and winding tunnel. That tunnel leads to a large underground chamber, where a number of pirate crews have a gathering. The island they are on turns out to be the starting point of an irregularly occurring, anything-goes sailing competition. For a moment, the Straw Hats decide whether it is wise to join the race, considering that two giants and a crew of fish-men, who were once the rivals of Arlong's gang, were participating as well. But once they learn the magnitude of the prize money, not entering is out of the question. From the bookmaker they receive an eternal pose, to lead them to the goal of the race. Free food is available at the bottom of the chamber and Luffy makes extensive use of it. His eating habit of stealing other people's food quickly angers the bounty hunter Shuraiya Bascùd, as well as a group of men from General Gasparde's crew. Gasparde is a deserted marine, with a bounty more than three times as high as Luffy's and said to be the race's favorite. A fight arises, and after Luffy and Shuraiya beat up his men, they find themselves standing before the general himself. He is impressed with their skill and offers both of them to work under him. Of course they refuse, but Luffy finds some insulting words and is caught off guard by Gasparde's right-hand man, Needles. Luffy's courage impresses Gasparde even more. He renews his offer, orders Needles to let go of the rookie pirate, and leaves the room. The next morning, a strong ocean current starts the race, by pushing the ships upstream over the island. As soon as they are over the top, the various crews start shooting broadsides, board each other's ships, and ram their competitors out of the water. But once the island is left behind, the field quickly clears up, leaving the Straw Hats time to eat. While inspecting the ship, Zoro discovers a boy named Anaguma, who had stowed away in order to earn money by killing some pirate to buy medicine for his adoptive grandfather, who works as an engineer on Gasparde's partially steam-powered ship. The race continues. After fighting yet another rival crew and an encounter with a group of large sea kings, they arrive at the island the eternal pose points to. The eternal poses were all mislabeled and led the fleet of unsuspecting pirates into reach of the cannons of the navy stronghold Navarone. Luffy has no doubt as to whose fault it is. They turn around and, using Chopper's fine nose, attempt to catch up with Gasparde's ship. Shuraiya, who had followed Gasparde's invitation to come along on his ship, turns against him to take revenge for Gasparde's killing his parents and sister. He fights Needles and throws him overboard but stands no chance against Gasparde's Syrup-Syrup Logia-type powers, which allow him to turn parts or all of his body into liquid or solid candy. The general is about to kill the bounty hunter when the Straw Hats arrive and catch his attention. Luffy confronts him and the two engage in a fierce but one-sided battle. Any attack Luffy throws at his opponent causes his limbs to get stuck in Gasparde's body. Only after Sanji gives two sacks of flour to Luffy can he overcome the villain's ability. Anaguma turns out to be a girl and Shuraiya's thought-dead sister, Adele Bascùd. With all their competitors taken out, the Straw Hats are about to finish the race, when a fleet of navy ships appears and forces them to abandon their prize money.

==== Characters introduced ====
- The Gasparde Pirates (ガスパーデ海賊団, Gasupāde Kaizokudan) are a pirate crew among the Dead End Race participants whose members include:
  - Gasparde (ガスパーデ, Gasupāde): A former Marine who became the captain of the Gasparde Pirates and is the main antagonist of Dead End Adventure. He ate the Candy-Candy Fruit which enables him to generate, control and become candy syrup. Gasparde is voiced by Tarō Ishida in the original Japanese version.
  - Needless (ニードルス, Nīdorusu): Gasparde's right-hand man. He uses as weapons a pair of extendable hooked claws. Needless is voiced by Jūrōta Kosugi in the original Japanese version.
  - Shuraiya Bascùd (シュライヤ・バスクード, Shuraiya Basukūdo): A bounty hunter who temporarily joins the Gasparde Pirates with the intention of taking revenge on Gasparde because he killed his family in the past. Shuraiya is voiced by Mitsuru Miyamoto in the original Japanese version.
  - Adelle Bascùd (アデル・バスクード, Aderu Basukūdo): Bascùd's long-lost younger sister who for years worked as assistant to Biera on Gasparde's under the nickname of "Badger" (アナグマ, Anaguma). Adelle is voiced by Miki Sakai in the original Japanese version.
  - Biera (ビエラ): An old man who works as the stoker for the boiler on Gasparde's ship. He was forced to take this job to protect himself and Adelle, to whom he is very close, with her calling him "Grandpa". Biera is voiced by Ichiro Nagai in the original Japanese version.
- Willy (ウィリー, Wirī): An orca-type fish-man and the captain of a crew of fish-men who competed in the Dead End Race. It is said that in the past, he was a rival of Arlong. Willy is voiced by Jūrōta Kosugi in the original Japanese version.
- Bobby (ボビー, Bobī) and Pogo (ポーゴ, Pōgo): A duo of giants who are part of the pirates participating in the Dead End Race. In the original Japanese version, Bobby and Pogo are voiced by Tetsu Inada and Daisuke Gōri, respectively.

=== The Cursed Holy Sword ===
The Cursed Holy Sword is the fifth animated feature film of the franchise. It premiered in Japan on March 6, 2004, and was released to DVD on July 21, 2004. The film made a five-week run in the Top 10 of the Japanese box office. In its first week of showing, it made third place, fourth place in its second week, followed by three weeks in fifth place. The film was shown along with a five-minute featurette short named Take Aim! The Pirate Baseball King.

Zoro goes missing, as the Straw Hats restock. On their search for him, Sanji, Nami, Chopper, and Robin follows Maya, a girl of the island, to a village. There, Zoro appears, accompanied by a group of marines. Zoro wields his sword against Sanji and takes three jewel orbs from Maya. Luffy stumbles upon a training center of the local Marine division. There, he encounters Saga, the leader of the center and owner of the Seven Star Sword, who made Zoro take the orbs to revive that sword's slumbering power. Luffy fights him but falls from a cliff. The Seven Stars Sword was that which had ruined the country of Asuka with its cursed power a long time ago and had therefore been sealed. But with a night of a red full moon that occurs only once every hundred years, the jewel orbs in his possession, and Zoro on his side, only the remaining Straw Hats stand in the way of Saga reviving the sword's true power.

==== Characters introduced ====
- Maya (マヤ): A young woman who is Saga's fiancé and the descendant of the priestess who sealed the cursed sword Shichiseiken. Maya is voiced by Ryōka Yuzuki in the original Japanese version.
- The Marine Dojo is a location at Asuka Island were some Marines teach sword fighting:
  - Saga (サガ): A Marine and skilled swordsman who is a childhood friend of Zoro, as well as Maya's fiance. He is an honorable young man that fell under the control of the Shichiseiken, a cursed sword, which changed his personality, becoming a power-driven person. Saga is voiced by Shido Nakamura in the original Japanese version.
  - Toma (トウマ, Tōma): A young Marine swordsman who acts as Saga's right-hand man. Toma is voiced by Hiroki Uchi in the original Japanese version.
  - Bismarck (ビスマルク, Bisumaruku): A subordinate of Saga, who like his companions is a skilled swordsman. Bismarck is voiced by Seiji Sasaki in the original Japanese version.
  - Boo Kong (ブーコング, Bū Kongu): A burly man, subordinate of Saga, who use as weapons two pierced clubs. Boo Kong is voiced by Takeshi Aono in the original Japanese version.
- Izaya (イザヤ): Maya's wise grandmother. Izaya is voiced by Masami Hisamoto in the original Japanese version.
- Lacos (ラコス, Rakosu): An inhabitant of Asuka Island and leader of his village's warriors. Lacos is voiced by Fumihiko Tachiki in the original Japanese version.

=== Baron Omatsuri and the Secret Island ===
Baron Omatsuri and the Secret Island is the sixth animated feature film of the franchise. It premiered in Japan on March 5, 2005, and was released to DVD on July 21, 2005. The film had a six-week run in the Top 10 of the Japanese box office. It made third place in its first week, fourth place in its second week, followed by two weeks at sixth place, fifth place in its fifth week, and seventh place in the sixth week.

The Straw Hats receive an invitation to an island resort on the Grand Line run by Baron Omatsuri, and the crew travels to the island intent on relaxing and having fun. The Baron welcomes them to the resort and encourages them to enjoy themselves, but only after they complete 'The Trials Of Hell'. The crew is hesitant, but Luffy accepts the challenge. The Straw Hats win the first trial, but the outraged Baron demands they compete in another challenge. Luffy, Chopper, and Robin wait at the resort while the rest of the crew participates in the second trial. Robin questions Muchigoro, one of Baron's crewmates, about a flower on the island. Muchigoro mentions something about the "Lily Carnation" being at the island's summit before running off. Luffy and Chopper wander off, both meeting other pirates who had previously arrived and participated in the trials. Luffy receives an ominous warning about Baron splitting up his crew. Chopper learns about Baron's past, but right before he figures out the mystery, he is stricken with an arrow shot by Baron. The Straw Hats win again, but rifts begin to grow between the crew members. The crew notices Chopper is missing, but Baron interrupts them with a dinner party. The Baron notices Robin leaving, and she reveals to him that she was looking for the Lily Carnation. Baron reveals the flower's secret to Robin while Robin looks shocked. The Straw Hats realize Chopper, Usopp, and Robin are gone. Arguments over who's to blame for their disappearances ensue before Baron announces the final trial. Tension between the crew results in the crew splitting up. The island known as Omatsuri Island was really a pirate island, only advertised as a resort by the Baron to lure pirates to the island to bring the same suffering and hatred he felt unto everyone else. Baron feeds the crew to the Lily Carnation, a flower of reincarnation, which gives life to Baron's crew. Luffy manages to save them from the Lily Carnation and defeat Baron with help from other pirates on the island. Baron cries for his friends that were lost and how he is alone. He had been fooling himself for years with the false constructs of his crew created by the Lily Carnation. Each of his dead crewmates speak with him, telling him that they were happy to be remembered, but not with his corrupted charade. They apologize for leaving him alone for so long but believe it would be for the best if he forgets the night they died and finds new friends. Luffy lays exhausted on the ground while the crew all appear unharmed with no memory of the incident. The Straw Hats gather around Luffy, wondering how he can sleep in such a place, and Luffy laughs.

The animation in this film is very different from the regular series, using the style often seen in Mamoru Hosoda's films. Some of the later episodes use styles similar to those seen in this film. The story also differs from the usually carefree and high strung style of writing that One Piece follows. The film follows a darker style of writing which received mixed reviews.

==== Characters introduced ====
- The Red Arrow Pirates (レッドアローズ海賊団, Reddo Arōzu Kaizokudan) are a pirate crew from the East Blue which consists of:
  - Omatsuri (オマツリ): The captain of the Red Arrows Pirates, and the secondary antagonist of Baron Omatsuri and the Secret Island. He invites other pirate crews to his island to participate in a series of competitions, with the intention of absorb their life energy and use it to resurrect his old crew. Omatsuri is voiced by Akio Ōtsuka in the original Japanese version.
  - Lily Carnation (リリー・カーネーション, Rirī Kānēshon): A sapient plant who acts as the main antagonist of Baron Omatsuri and the Secret Island. Under the appearance of an innocent flower, it is actually a diabolical creature that takes control over Omatsuri. Lily Carnation is voiced by Misa Watanabe in the original Japanese version.

=== Giant Mecha Soldier of Karakuri Castle ===
Giant Mecha Soldier of Karakuri Castle is the seventh animated feature film of the franchise. It premiered in Japan on March 4, 2006, and was released to DVD on July 21, 2006. The film had a six-week run in the Top 10 of the Japanese box office. It made fourth place in its first week, sixth place in its second week, and seventh place in its third week. In its fourth week of showing, the film placed sixth again, followed by fifth place in week five, and tenth place in its sixth week of showing.

The Straw Hats visit an island, known as Mecha Island, where a fisherman sings an old folk song about a Golden Crown. Searching for that mysterious treasure, they find a hidden entrance into the island. The island's leader, Ratchet, impressed with the find and in search of the Golden Crown himself, invites the crew to join him in his search, and the crew along with Ratchet and his henchmen enter the cave. As it turns out, the island's true form is that of a giant turtle. Ratchet, who had known this all along, uses his mechanical castle to take control of the turtle wishing to use it to take over the world. Now the Straw Hats have to stop not only Ratchet, but also the helpless turtle, from crashing into a nearby island.

=== The Desert Princess and the Pirates: Adventures in Alabasta ===
The Desert Princess and the Pirates: Adventures in Alabasta is the eighth animated feature film of the franchise and the only One Piece film to additionally star Misa Watanabe as Nefeltari Vivi. It premiered in Japan on March 3, 2007, and was released to DVD on July 21, 2007. The film was licensed by Funimation and given a limited theatrical release in the United States on February 7, 2008. Funimation also released the film to DVD on February 19, 2008, and to Blu-ray on January 27, 2009. The film placed four times in the Top 10 of the Japanese weekend box office. It placed second in its first week, fourth in its second week, and ninth in its third and fourth weeks of showing.

The film is an abridged retelling of the Alabasta storyline from the manga. The Straw Hats travel to Alabasta, the desert island and home of Nefertari Vivi. They find the country in the middle of a revolution. Sir Crocodile, the country's hero, secretly used his criminal organization, Baroque Works, to undermine the citizens' trust in Cobra, Vivi's father and head of the Kingdom of Sand, in order to seize the throne and the country's hidden secret for himself. The crew now has to cross the desert, stop the revolution, save thousands of lives from Baroque Works' hidden bombers, and most of all, defeat Crocodile, one of the mighty Seven Warlords of the Sea.

The TV cut of the film, first aired in April 2011 in Japan, adds a 15-minute prologue to the start of the film. The new section adapts the Whisky Peak arc in abridged form to explain how the crew meet Vivi.

=== Episode of Chopper Plus: Bloom in the Winter, Miracle Sakura ===
Episode of Chopper Plus: Bloom in the Winter, Miracle Sakura is the ninth animated feature film of the franchise and the first to additionally star Kazuki Yao as Franky. It premiered in Japan on March 1, 2008, and was released to DVD on July 21, 2008. The film had a five-week run in the Top 10 of the Japanese box office. It placed third in its first week of showing, seventh in its second, eighth in its third week, tenth in its fourth week, and ninth in its fifth week.

It is the second film to focus on Chopper, as it is a retelling of the Drum Island storyline from the manga. It features Franky, Nico Robin, and the Thousand Sunny, who were not present in the original version, replacing Nefertari Vivi, Karoo and the Going Merry from the canonical story. The plot also includes as a new character to Musshuru, Wapol's older brother.

The 2014 TV cut of the film adds two new scenes, to frame the film, increasing the run time by 4 minutes. The film is shown to be a dream by Chopper set after the two-year time skip.

==== Characters introduced ====
- Musshuru (ムッシュール, Musshūru): The secondary antagonist of Episode of Chopper Plus: Bloom in Winter, Miracle Sakura and the older brother of Wapol. He ate the Shroom-Shroom Fruit which enables him to release and control poisonous spores from his body which can be countered by an antidote and fire. He also has a minor appearance in the film One Piece: Stampede accompanying the Bliking Pirates at the Pirate Festival. Musshuru is voiced by Monta Mino in the original Japanese version.

==== Legacy ====
A picture of Chopper crying (which comes from promotional material and not the actual movie, which uses a modified shot), became a popular internet meme.

=== One Piece Film: Strong World ===
One Piece Film: Strong World is the tenth animated feature film of the franchise, and the first to additionally star Chō as Brook. It was written by manga creator Eiichiro Oda himself. It was directed by Munehisa Sakai. News of the film first appeared during a showing of the Episode of Chopper Plus, during which a teaser for the tenth film was revealed. The film was originally meant for a spring release in 2009, but complications with the script pushed the release date back. Eventually, the film premiered on December 12, 2009. On July 28, 2012, Funimation announced that they had acquired the license to One Piece Film: Strong World and have since released the film on November 19, 2013.

As stated, the film is an original story written by Eiichiro Oda himself in honor of One Piece's Tenth Anniversary. In previous films, Oda only supplied character designs and approved story ideas. For One Piece Film: Strong World, Toei personally asked if he would write the script. The film is set between the Thriller Bark Arc and the Sabaody Archipelago Arc, as Brook is shown alongside the other Straw Hat Pirates (making this his first film appearance), and Sengoku and Garp are still in their positions in the Marines.

==== Characters introduced ====
- Billy (ビリー, Birī): A giant yellow duck/peafowl hybrid with electrical feathers who was created by Dr. Indigo. He later helped Luffy in the final battle against Shiki. Billy was later seen in One Piece: Stampede attending the pirates festival on Delta Island. Billy's vocal effects are provided by Yasuhiro Takato in the original Japanese version and by Jessie James Grelle in the Funimation dub.
- Golden Lion Pirates (金獅子海賊団, Kinjishi Kaizokudan) are a pirate crew established by Shiki and travel around on the Island Ship. Besides Shiki, they consist of:
  - Indigo (インディゴ, Indigo): A scientist and member of the Golden Pirates who created the mutant animals that work for Shiki by making use of drug called SIQ that was derived from the IQ plant which makes their brains evolve. He was also responsible for creating Boss. It took Indigo 20 years to build the Mutated Animnal Army using SIQ as seen in Chapter 0. Indigo is voiced by Ryūsei Nakao in the original Japanese version and by Sean Schemmel in the Funimation dub.
  - Scarlet (スカーレット, Sukāretto): A purple-red gorilla of indeterminate background and member of the Golden Pirates. Scarlet's vocal effects are provided by Banjō Ginga in the original Japanese version and by Bryan Massey in the Funimation dub.
- Xiao (シャオ, Shao): A girl who lives in Merveille. Like the other inhabitants, she is seen holding feathers in her arms. After being rescued by Zoro and Chopper from being attacked by mutated animals, they take Xiao back to her village with her family. Xiao is voiced by Wasabi Mizuta in the original Japanese version and by Lindsay Seidel in the Funimation dub.

=== Straw Hat Chase ===
Straw Hat Chase is the eleventh animated feature film of the franchise and the first to also use computer animation. It was directed by Hiroyuki Satō and was released in Japan on March 19, 2011, and was released to DVD and Blu-ray on July 20, 2011. It was double billed with the Toriko film Toriko 3D: Kaimaku! Gourmet Adventure! The film features Tomomitsu Yamaguchi as Schneider and Bazz, and the music was written and performed by the Tokyo Ska Paradise Orchestra. It was released as Jump Heroes Movies and Grossed $9,796,866 worldwide.

Luffy desperately tries to find his missing straw hat, and after extensive searching Usopp discovers that an eagle has it. Luffy and the entire Crew proceed to chase the eagle. While searching for Luffy's hat, Chopper discovers an old man lying half dead on a ship. While Luffy continues chasing the eagle and eventually crashes it into a marine base, the old man named Schneider wakes up. Chopper noticed that he had been mumbling the name Bazz in his sleep, and asks him who it is. Schneider tells Chopper that Bazz was his friend and that he was a dog that ate the "tori tori no mi: model eagle". He tells Chopper that he told Bazz to steal Monkey D. Luffy's hat and then he could come back. He thought that telling Bazz this would force him to abandon Schneider, because he did not want Bazz to see him die. When Chopper informs him that not only did Bazz successfully steal Luffy's hat, but that he was on the Straw Hat Pirates' ship. Schneider immediately jumps out of bed and runs to save Bazz who at that moment is trapped in a cage with Luffy, made of kairouseki. After Luffy's crew frees him and Bazz, Schneider apologizes to Bazz and tells him to give up on the hat. Luffy meanwhile is fighting his way through a whole marine base along with three giants. Finally he makes it to the marine captain holding his hat, only to have him throw it out to sea. Luffy immediately jumps out after it, and almost has it when he starts to fall. Bazz then comes to his rescue and Luffy finally retrieves his hat. Afterwards Schneider and Bazz decide to go back out to sea and Schneider tells Luffy that the hat suits him.

==== Characters introduced ====
- Schneider (シュナイダー, Shunaidā): The captain of the Schneider Pirates who operates in Paradise. Schneider is voiced by Tomomitsu Yamaguchi in the original Japanese version.
- Buzz (バズ, Bazu): The pet bulldog of Schneider. He ate the Bird-Bird Fruit: Model Eagle, which enables him to turn into an eagle or an eagle-bulldog form resembling a Simurgh. Buzz's vocal effects are provided by Tomomitsu Tamaguchi in the original Japanese version.

=== One Piece Film: Z ===
The 12th One Piece film was released on December 15, 2012. As with Strong World, it is overseen by Eiichiro Oda. As well, it is the first One Piece film to take place in the New World, after the two-year time-skip. Zephyr (referred to as Z), an ex-admiral of the marines and leader of the Neo Navy, steals the Marines stash of "Dyna Stones", powerful explosives, that, when exposed to oxygen, explode with enough force to destroy islands. Using these stones, he plans on destroying the 3 End Points (3 volcanoes in the New World that connect to huge lava sources) and flood the New World with lava. When he runs into the Straw Hats and one of his subordinates revert Nami, Chopper, Robin, and Brook younger in age. It is up to Luffy, his crew, and other unexpected allies to find and stop Z from finishing his plan while having to fight not only the Neo Navy, but the Marines as well.

The film also portrays the cast wearing Armani Exchange suits in one part of the film, possibly as a promotional campaign. This was done in collaboration with the creator of the series, Eiichiro Oda, who selected the outfits designed by Armani Exchange. The Shibuya branch of Armani Exchange sells some of the suits in the film.

==== Characters introduced ====
- The Neo Marines (NEO海軍, Neo Kaigun) are an organization founded by former members of the Marines which includes:
  - Z (ゼット, Zetto): Formerly known by his birth name and epithet "Black Arm" Zephyr (黒腕のゼファー, Kokuwan no Zefā), Z is the Supreme Commander of the Neo Marines with a cybernetic right arm. He is a former Marine Admiral and instructor. In the past, a pirate who hated him murdered his wife and son. Years later, another pirate cut off his arm and massacred his entire crew except Ain and Binz, after which he was granted a mechanical arm. During the time of the series' timeskip, after learning that the pirate who cut off his arm was offered to join the Seven Warlords of the Sea, it caused Zephyr to resign from the Marines and found his own organization to wipe out pirates. After being defeated and spared by Luffy, Z sacrifices his own life to give Luffy time to get away from Kizaru's Marine force and to protect his remaining followers. In the original Japanese version, Z is voiced by Hōchū Ōtsuka, while Masami Suzuki voices him in his youth. In the Funimation dub, Z is voiced by Jeremy Schwartz, while Tia Ballard voices him in his youth.
  - Ain (アイン, Ain): The vice-admiral of the Neo Marines and the major antagonist of One Piece Film: Z. She ate the Return-Return Fruit which enables her to return anyone she touches to their child state. Ain is voiced by Rumi Kasahara in the original Japanese version of the anime and by Ryōko Shinohara in the original Japanese version of One Piece Film: Z. In the Funimation dub, she is voiced by Lauren Landa.
  - Binz (ビンズ, Binzu): An officer of the Neo Marines. He ate the Grow-Grow Fruit which enables him to speed up the growth of plant life. Binz is voiced by Teruyuki Kagawa in the original Japanese version and by Matthew Mercer in the Funimation dub.

=== One Piece Film: Gold ===
The 13th One Piece film was released on July 23, 2016. The film followed the July 16, 2016, TV special titled One Piece: Heart of Gold. The first 2016 issue of Shueisha's Weekly Shonen Jump magazine also revealed that Eiichiro Oda would be part of the anime film as executive producer. The report also states that anime director Hiroaki Miyamoto, who helmed "One Piece" episodes 352–679 and was assistant director for "One Piece: Baron Omatsuri and the Secret Island," will be part of the "One Piece Film: Gold" as director. This anime film was penned by Tsutomu Kuroiwa, the scriptwriter of the live-action "Black Butler" film, the live-action "Liar Game: The Final Stage" film, and the live-action "The Perfect Insider" TV series.

==== Characters introduced ====
- Gran Tesoro is a massive ship with a metropolis built on it, which is full of casinos. Gran Tesoro's staff include:
  - Gild Tesoro (ギルド・テゾーロ, Girudo Tezōro): The ruler of the metropolitan ship Gran Tesoro and the main antagonist of One Piece Film: Gold. He ate the Gold-Gold Fruit which enables him to manipulate gold. Gild Tesoro is voiced by Kazuhiro Yamaji as an adult in the original Japanese version and by Takahiro Sakurai as a young man in the original Japanese version. In the English dub, he is voiced by Keith Silverstein as an adult, Dallas Reid as a young man, and Katy Tye as a child.
  - Carina (カリーナ, Karīna): Nicknamed "Phantom Thief" (怪盗, Kaitō), Carina is a thief who worked as a songstress in Gran Tesoro, plotting to steal its riches. In the past, she and Nami were competing thieves in the East Blue, being called "Hellcat" (女狐, Megitsune; lit. "Vixen") by her. After helping the Straw Hat Pirates overthrow Gild Tesoro, Carina takes command of Gran Tesoro. Carina is voiced by Hikari Mitsushima in the original Japanese version and by Michele Knotz in the Funimation dub.
  - Tanaka (タナカさん, Tanaka): The security guard on Gran Tesoro. He ate the Through-Through Fruit which enables him to phase through solid objects. Tanaka is voiced by Gaku Hamada in the original Japanese version and by Daman Mills in the Funimation dub.
  - Dice (ダイス, Daisu): A thickset executive, dealer, and masochist on Gran Tesoro who is a champion of the death matches. Dice is voiced by Kendo Kobayashi in the original Japanese version and by Tyson Rinehart in the Funimation dub.
  - Baccarat (バカラ, Bakara): The concierge on Gran Tesoro. She ate the Luck-Luck Fruit, which enables her to steal the good luck of anyone she touches. Baccarat is voiced by Nanao in the original Japanese version and by Amber Lee Connors in the Funimation dub.
- Raise Max (レイズ・マックス, Reizu Makkusu): A member of the Revolutionary Army, nicknamed as the "Legendary Gambler" (伝説のギャンブラー, Densetsu no Gyanburā), who after visiting Gran Tesoro experienced a huge loss causing him to be imprisoned in a giant chamber filled with gold. Raise Max is voiced by Kin'ya Kitaōji in the original Japanese version and by Garrett Schenck in the Funimation dub.

=== One Piece: Stampede ===
The 14th One Piece film was released on August 9, 2019. It was directed by Takashi Otsuka and was first announced following the broadcast of Episode of Skypiea. The film commemorates the anime's 20th anniversary.

==== Characters introduced ====
- Douglas Bullet (ダグラス・バレット, Dagurasu Baretto): A former Roger Pirates member and the main antagonist of One Piece: Stampede. He ate the Clank-Clank Fruit which enables him to disassemble and reassemble any objects into whatever he can think of. Douglas Bullet is voiced by Tsutomo Isobe in the original Japanese version and by Daman Mills in the Funimation dub.
- Buena Festa (ブエナ・フェスタ, Buena Fesuta): Is the promoter of the Pirates Festival, which he organized along with Douglas Bullet in order to bring an end to the Great Age of Pirates and start his own era. Buena Festa is voiced by Yūsuke Santamaria in the original Japanese version and by Mick Wingert in the Funimation dub.
- Donald Moderate (ドナルド・モデラート, Donarudo Moderāto): The presenter of the Pirates Festival. A man with a peg leg and a metal claw replacing his hand. Donald Moderate is voiced by Ryota Yamasato in the original Japanese version and by Anthony Bowling in the Funimation dub.
- Ann (アン, An): A pop music singer who was born on Tongari Island. She ate the Vision-Vision Fruit which enables her to create illusions of any pictures that she touches. The character debuted in the stage show One Piece Live Attraction: Phantom (portrayed by Saori Hayami). In One Piece: Stampede she acts as a guest presenter of the Pirates Festival. Ann is voiced by Rino Sashihara in the original Japanese version and by Macy Ann Johnson in the Funimation dub.

=== One Piece Film: Red ===
The 15th One Piece film was released on August 6, 2022. It was first announced in the November 21, 2021, issue of Weekly Shōnen Jump in commemoration of the anime Episode 1000's release. One Piece Film: Red is also the highest grossing One Piece film to date. Despite only being released to box office in Japan, its box office gross revenue is approximately three times higher than the next highest in Japan (One Piece: Film Z) and 1.7 times higher than One Piece: Stampede, which previously held the record for highest global box office revenue among One Piece films.

This film also stars Japanese pop singer Ado, who sings various original and co-written songs, such as "Mrs. Green Apple's 私は最強", which topped charts across Japan.

==== Characters introduced ====
- Uta (ウタ, Uta): A world-famous singer who was the adopted daughter of Red-Haired Shanks, childhood friend of Monkey D. Luffy and the main antagonist of One Piece Film: Red. Before the film, her childhood with Luffy is explored in the anime-exclusive Uta's Past arc. She ate the Sing-Sing Fruit which enables her singing to send anyone's consciousness to a virtual space that she calls "Uta World". Uta is voiced by Kaori Nazuka in the original Japanese version and by AmaLee in the Funimation dub. Ado provided Uta's singing voice in both versions of the film, who also recorded the soundtrack album focused on the character Uta's Songs: One Piece Film Red.
- Gordon (ゴードン, Gōdon): The former king of the Elegia Kingdom and the foster parent of Uta. He asks Luffy and his friends for help to stop Uta's plans. Gordon is voiced by Kenjiro Tsuda in the original Japanese version and by Jim Foronda in the Funimation dub.

=== One Piece Film: God Valley ===
The 16th One Piece film is set to release on Q3 2027, adapting the manga's God Valley flashback of the Elbaph arc. It was first announced during the One Piece Day event in August 2026. This will be the first canon One Piece movie.

=== One Piece Film: BAAD ===
The 17th One Piece film, under the title of One Piece Film: BAAD, was announced during the One Piece Day event in August 2026, is set to be released in 2029.

== Reception ==
=== Box office performance ===
Film	Release	Box office gross revenue				Box office ticket sales	
Film	Release	Japan	South Korea	China	Other territories	Japan (est.)	China
One Piece	March 4, 2000	¥2,160,000,000	—N/a	—N/a	—N/a	1,700,000	—N/a
Clockwork Island Adventure	March 3, 2001	¥3,000,000,000	—N/a	—N/a	—N/a	2,400,000	—N/a
Chopper's Kingdom on the Island of Strange Animals	March 2, 2002	¥2,000,000,000	—N/a	—N/a	—N/a	1,600,000	—N/a
Dead End Adventure	March 1, 2003	¥2,000,000,000	—N/a	—N/a	$22,989	1,600,000	—N/a
The Cursed Holy Sword	March 6, 2004	¥1,800,000,000	—N/a	—N/a	Unknown	1,500,000	—N/a
Baron Omatsuri and the Secret Island	March 5, 2005	¥1,233,551,871	—N/a	—N/a	$28,298	1,000,000	—N/a
Giant Mecha Soldier of Karakuri Castle	March 4, 2006	¥990,000,000	₩3,351,337,500	N/A	$17,806	800,000	—N/a
The Desert Princess and the Pirates: Adventures in Alabasta	March 3, 2007	¥990,000,000	—N/a	N/A	$8,380	810,000	—N/a
Episode of Chopper Plus: Bloom in the Winter, Miracle Sakura	March 1, 2008	¥920,000,000	—N/a	N/A	$34,995	760,000	—N/a
One Piece Film: Strong World	December 12, 2009	¥4,800,000,000	₩987,877,070	N/A	$226,551	3,850,000	—N/a
One Piece 3D: Straw Hat Chase	March 19, 2011	¥790,000,000	₩91,648,500	—N/a	Unknown	630,000	—N/a
One Piece Film: Z	December 15, 2012	¥6,870,000,000	₩626,891,000	N/A	$2,064,005 (Note: One Piece: Film Z: Hong Kong & Taiwan – $1,382,211; Philippines, Singapore, Thailand – $681,794)	5,630,000	—N/a
Episode of Merry	August 28, 2014 (Note: One Piece television specials had limited theatrical release in South Korea.)	—N/a	₩28,590,200	—N/a	Unknown	—N/a	—N/a
Episode of Nami	December 6, 2014	—N/a	₩12,319,500	—N/a	Unknown	—N/a	—N/a
Episode of Luffy	December 10, 2014	—N/a	₩11,342,500	—N/a	Unknown	—N/a	—N/a
One Piece Film: Gold	July 23, 2016	¥5,180,000,000	₩1,710,761,100	¥107,335,000	$1,411,079 (Note: One Piece: Film Gold: North America, France, Italy, Spain, New Zealand, Thailand – $1,319,785; Australia – $91,294)	3,870,000	3,967,900
One Piece: Stampede	August 9, 2019	¥5,550,000,000	₩190,146,160	¥205,000,000	$14,498,202 (Note: One Piece: Stampede overseas box office (excluding China and South Korea): As of 13 November 2019 – $13 million; After 13 November 2019 – $1,498,202 (Box Office Mojo tracked territories))	4,170,000	6,677,800
One Piece Film: Red	August 6, 2022	¥20,340,000,000	₩2,201,461,224	¥185,000,000	$65,000,000	14,740,000	5,601,960
Regional total		¥58,623,551,871	₩9,212,374,754	¥497,335,000	$83,312,305	45,060,000	10,645,700

== See also ==
- List of One Piece media
- List of One Piece television specials
