= List of One Piece chapters (389–594) =

Forty-first volume of One Piece, released in Japan by Shueisha on April 4, 2006

One Piece is a Japanese manga series written and illustrated by Eiichiro Oda which has been translated into various languages and spawned a substantial media franchise, including animated and live action television series, films, video games, and associated music and merchandise. It follows the adventures of the teenaged boy and pirate captain Monkey D. Luffy, whose body gained the properties of rubber after he accidentally ate a supernatural fruit, as he travels the oceans in search of the series' titular treasure and organizes a diverse crew, named the Straw Hats.

In Japan, the series is published by Shueisha. Individual chapters have been published regularly in the shōnen manga anthology Weekly Shōnen Jump since July 22, 1997 and tankōbon format volumes (each collecting 10 to 12 chapters) have been published since December 24, 1997. The series spans over 1175 chapters and, as of March 2026, has 114 tankōbon volumes, making One Piece the 20th longest manga series by volume count.

The series has been translated and released in multiple countries. English localization began in North America, where Viz Media currently serializes One Piece in the Shonen Jump digital vault simultaneously with Japan. It originally published its English language adaptation of the series in the now-defunct monthly print anthology Shonen Jump starting with the magazine's launch in November 2002. It also publishes tankōbon format books since June 2003, which have been collected into omnibus editions incorporating three tankōbon each since December 2009; chapters and books also are published digitally through its website. In the United Kingdom, the tankōbon were published by Gollancz Manga, starting March 2006, until Viz Media took over after the fourteenth volume. In Australia and New Zealand, the English volumes have been distributed by Madman Entertainment since November 10, 2008. By October 6, 2009, only 22 volumes had been released in English. However, as announced in July 2009, Viz Media increased that number to 53 by June 2010, using an accelerated publishing schedule of five volumes per month during the first half of 2010. As of November 2025, 110 volumes of the English version have been officially released by Viz Media.

== Volumes ==
No.	Title	Original release date	English release date
41	Declaration of War; Sensen Fukoku (宣戦布告)	April 4, 2006; 4-08-874047-5	April 6, 2010; 1-4215-3457-6
389. "Response" (応答, "Ōtō"); 390. "Accepting the Challenge" (応戦, "Ōsen"); 391. "The Girl They Called a Demon" (悪魔と呼ばれた少女, "Akuma to Yobareta Shōjo"); 392. "Dereshi" (デレシ); 393. "Olvia" (オルビア, "Orubia"); 394. "The Demons of Ohara" (オハラの悪魔達, "Ohara no Akumatachi"); 395. "Ohara vs. the World Government" (オハラVS世界政府, "Ohara VS Sekai Seifu"); 396. "Saul" (サウロ, "Sauro"); 397. "In Hopes of Reaching the Future" (未来へ届くように, "Mirai e Todoku Yō ni"); 398. "Declaration of War" (宣戦布告, "Sensen Fukoku"); 399. "Jump Toward the Waterfall!!" (滝に向かって飛べ!!, "Taki ni Mukatte Tobe!!")
The Straw Hats and CP9, and their two captives, face each other down. Nico Robin tries turning the crew away again, but when Monkey D. Luffy tells her that she can die as part of the crew instead, Robin experiences a flashback to her childhood. Raised on an island of archaeologists, Robin and the rest of the islanders attempt to discover the secret of the void century, a period in time that the government forbids anyone to know. To prevent knowledge of the void century from spreading, the island and its inhabitants (except Robin) are destroyed. Aokiji allows Robin to escape, challenging her to find friends and to live. Realizing that she had almost given up on both, Robin decides she wants to live with the rest of the Straw Hats. Touched by their words, Franky reveals that the blueprints CP9 have been searching are hidden on his person, but they are not that of Pluton, but an "opposing weapon" and he promptly destroys them, giving CP9 no further reason to keep him in custody.
42	Pirates vs. CP9; Kaizoku vs CP9 (海賊 VS CP9)	July 4, 2006; 4-08-874127-7	April 6, 2010; 1-4215-3458-4
400. "The Key to Freedom" (解放の鍵, "Kaihō no Kagi"); 401. "Pirates vs. CP9" (海賊 VS CP9, "Kaizoku VS CP9"); 402. "Handcuffs No. 2" (2番の手錠, "Niban no Tejō"); 403. "Mr. Chivalry" (Mr.騎士道, "Mr. Kishidō"); 404. "Franky vs. Fukurô" (フランキーVSフクロウ, "Furankī vs Fukurō"); 405. "Power" (パワー, "Pawā"); 406. "Life Return" (生命帰還, "Seimei Kikan"); 407. "Monster" (モンスター, "Monsutā"); 408. "Monster vs. Kumadori" (怪物VSクマドリ, "Monsutā vs Kumadori"); 409. "The Terrifying Broadcast" (凶報緊急大放送, "Kyōhō Kinkyū Daihōsō")
The Straw Hats and Franky break off and engage CP9 in battle. Unsuited for the initial pairings, the crew exchanges opponents to improve their chances of victory, allowing two members of CP9 to be defeated. Meanwhile, Luffy follows Robin's captors, CP9 leader Spandam and CP9's strongest member Rob Lucci. Lucci fights Luffy in order to give Spandam time to take Robin to the government's inescapable prisons. Instead, while trying to call for help, Spandam accidentally triggers the destruction of the Straw Hats, summoning the world government to destroy Enies Lobby and whoever is on it.
43	Legend of a Hero; Eiyū Densetsu (英雄伝説)	September 4, 2006; 4-08-874149-8	April 6, 2010; 1-4215-3459-2
410. "Super-Size Nami" (ナミ巨大化, "Nami Kyodaika"); 411. "Nami vs. Kalifa" (ナミVSカリファ, "Nami VS Karifa"); 412. "You Missed Your Chance" (好機は終わった, "Chansu wa Owatta"); 413. "Hunter" (狩人, "Kariudo"); 414. "Sanji vs. Jabra" (サンジVSジャブラ, "Sanji VS Jabura"); 415. "Heat Up" (ヒートアップ, "Hīto Appu"); 416. "Zoro vs. Kaku" (ゾロVSカク, "Zoro VS Kaku"); 417. "Asura" (阿修羅, "Ashura"); 418. "Luffy vs. Rob Lucci" (ルフィVSロブ・ルッチ, "Rufi VS Robu Rutchi"); 419. "Legend of a Hero" (英雄伝説, "Eiyū Densetsu")
With the destruction of Enies Lobby imminent, all government personnel begin to evacuate. The Straw Hats continue fighting and, with the exception of Luffy versus Lucci, defeat the remaining members of CP9. Their battles won, they team up and hurry to stop Robin from being taken past the point of no return. They succeed and Robin is freed.
44	Let's Go Back; Kaerou (帰ろう)	December 4, 2006; 4-08-874287-7	May 4, 2010; 1-4215-3460-6
420. "Buster Call" (バスターコール, "Basutā Kōru"); 421. "Gear Three" (ギア3, "Gia Sādo"); 422. "Rob Lucci" (ロブ・ルッチ, "Robu Rutchi"); 423. "Mermaid Legend" (人魚伝説, "Ningyo Densetsu"); 424. "Escape Ship" (脱出船, "Dasshutsu Sen"); 425. "Bridge of Mortal Combat" (死闘の橋, "Shitō no Hashi"); 426. "A Ship Waiting for Wind" (風待ちの船, "Kazamachi no Fune"); 427. "This Isn't the Afterlife" (ここが地獄じゃあるめェし, "Koko ga Jigoku ja arumē shi"); 428. "Let's Go Back" (帰ろう, "Kaerou"); 429. "Utter Defeat" (完敗, "Kanpai"); 430. "A Light Snow of Reminiscence Falls" (降りそそぐ追想の淡雪, "Furisosogu Tsuisō no Awayuki")
As the battle between Luffy and Lucci rages on, the destruction of Enies Lobby commences. The members of Galley-La and the "Franky Family" evacuate as the government employees have done, and the Straw Hats secure an escape route to use after Lucci's defeat. Once Luffy wins however, Enies Lobby's destroyers unite in their efforts to finish off the crew that beat CP9. Just when they lose their last piece of refuge, the Straw Hats are able to escape on the Merry, it having come to save them in their time of need. The crew joins with Galley-La and the Frankies and returns to Water Seven. The Merry begins to break down during the trip, so with heavy hearts the crew says goodbye to the vessel and gives it a Viking funeral.
45	You Have My Sympathies; Shinchū Osasshisuru (心中お察しする)	March 2, 2007; 978-4-08-874314-1	May 4, 2010; 1-4215-3461-4
431. "Fist of Love" (愛の拳, "Ai no Kobushi"); 432. "Jack-in-the-Box" (びっくり箱, "Bikkuri Bako"); 433. "The Name of That Sea" (その海の名は, "Sono Umi no Na wa"); 434. "Whitebeard and Red-Hair" (白髭と赤髪, "Shirohige to Akagami"); 435. "You Have My Sympathies" (心中お察しする, "Shinchū Osasshisuru"); 436. "Trunks from Franky House" ("Pants from Frankyhouse"); 437. "Naked Mania" (裸百貫, "Hadaka Hyaku Kan"); 438. "Pride" (プライド, "Puraido"); 439. "Third and Seventh" (3人目と7人目, "Sanninme to Nananinme"); 440. "Fire Fist vs. Blackbeard" (火拳VS黒ひげ, "Hiken VS Kurohige")
When they return to Water Seven, Franky decides to build a new ship for the Straw Hats. As they wait for him to finish they are visited by a contingent of naval officers led by Vice Admiral Monkey D. Garp, Luffy's grandfather. Though on opposing sides of the law, Garp only wants to spend some time with his grandson and leaves without confrontation. Meanwhile, the Straw Hats learn that they have been blamed for the destruction of Enies Lobby and have bounties on their heads because of it. Since Franky is also subject to a bounty, he decides to join the Straw Hats after completing their ship, although they have to trick him into it by stealing his trunks. Usopp also officially rejoins the crew and the Straw Hats name their new ship Thousand Sunny before escaping Water Seven. After a brief scuffle with Garp, who is forced by his superiors to try to capture Luffy, the Straw Hats continue on to their next adventure. Elsewhere, Luffy's brother, Portgas D. Ace, finds Blackbeard, the man he has spent the entirety of the series looking for. The two are drawn into a battle whose outcome is not revealed until much later.
46	Adventure on Ghost Island; Gōsuto Airando no Bōken (ゴースト島の冒険)	July 4, 2007; 978-4-08-874382-0	May 4, 2010; 1-4215-3462-2
441. "Duel on Banaro Island" (バナロ島の決闘, "Banaro-Tō no Kettō"); 442. "Adventure in the Demonic Sea" (魔の海の冒険, "Ma no Umi no Bōken"); 443. "Thriller Bark" (スリラーバーク, "Surirābāku"); 444. "Adventure on Ghost Island" (ゴースト島の冒険, "Gōsuto Airando no Bōken"); 445. "Zombies" ("The Zombie"); 446. "Doctor Hogback" (ドクトル・ホグバック, "Dokutoru Hogubakku"); 447. "Zombie-in-the-Box" (びっくりゾンビ, "Bikkuri Zonbi"); 448. "Moria" (モリア); 449. "The Four Monsters of Thriller Bark" (スリラーバークの四怪人, "Surirābāku no Yonkaijin")
The Straw Hat Pirates continue their adventure across the seas. After being stuck in a fog not even the sun can penetrate, the crew meets Brook, a living skeleton who immediately agrees to join their crew. Unfortunately for the Straw Hats, Brook lost his shadow on the giant ship known as Thriller Bark and cannot accompany them outside the fog. Determined to have Brook as part of the crew, they go to the Thriller Bark in order to get Brook's shadow back. Tony Tony Chopper, Usopp, and Nami serve as the first boarding party, and find that the ship is inhabited by zombies. When the rest of the Straw Hats follow they discover that Brook is not the only one who has lost his shadow, and that much of the island-like ship's populace have had their shadows stolen by Gecko Moria.
47	Cloudy, Partly Bony; Kumori Tokidoki Hone (くもり時々ホネ)	September 4, 2007; 978-4-08-874411-7	May 4, 2010; 1-4215-3463-0
450. "Night of the Zombie Generals" (将軍ゾンビnight, "Jeneraru Zonbi night"); 451. "Perona's Wonder Garden" (ペローナの不思議の庭, "Perōna no Wandā Gāden"); 452. "Jigoro of the Wind" (風のジゴロウ, "Kaze no Jigorō"); 453. "Cloudy, Partly Bony" (くもり時々ホネ, "Kumori Tokidoki Hone"); 454. "The Humming Swordsman" (ハナウタ, "Hanauta"); 455. "Gecko Moria of the Seven Warlords of the Sea" (王下七武海ゲッコー・モリア, "Ōka Shichibukai Gekkō Moria"); 456. "Demon from the Land of Ice" (氷の国から来た魔人, "Kōri no Kuni kara Kita Majin"); 457. "Meat!!!" (肉〜〜!!!, "Niku~~!!!"); 458. "Anything but My Afro" (アフロだけは, "Afuro dake wa"); 459. "I Can't Just Die Hoping to be Forgiven" (死んでごめんじゃないでしょうに, "Shin de Gomen ja nai Deshō ni")
Moria mobilizes his zombies to capture the Straw Hats, who in turn try to reunite their two boarding parties. However, when they begin to engage Moria's forces in an effort to accomplish this goal, members of the crew mysteriously disappear. Brook explains this is Moria's doing. He captures those who enter Thriller Bark, removes their shadows, and inserts them into patched-up corpses in order to reanimate them and create his own zombie army. The shadowless individuals are forced to stay out of the sunlight or risk their own destruction, so that most stay within the impenetrable fogs of Thriller Bark. With Sanji, Roronoa Zoro, and Monkey D. Luffy having lost their shadows and Nami similarly unaccounted for, the Straw Hats become determined to defeat Moria.
48	Adventures of Oars; Ōzu no Bōken (オーズの冒険)	December 4, 2007; 978-4-08-874442-1	May 4, 2010; 1-4215-3464-9
460. "Conquest Before Dawn!" (夜明け前に取り返せ!!, "Yoake Mae ni Torikaese!!"); 461. "Ghost Buster" (ゴーストバスター, "Gōsuto Basutā"); 462. "Adventures of Oars" (オーズの冒険, "Ōzu no Bōken"); 463. "Pirate Sanji vs. Mystery Man Absalom" (海賊サンジVS怪人アブサロム, "Kaizoku Sanji VS Kaijin Abusaromu"); 464. "Sanji's Dream" (サンジの夢, "Sanji no Yume"); 465. "Pirate Usopp vs. Mystery Woman Perona" (海賊ウソップVS怪人ペローナ, "Kaizoku Usoppu VS Purinsesu Perōna"); 466. "Conclusion" (決着, "Ketchaku"); 467. "Pirate Zoro vs. Samurai Ryuma" (海賊ゾロVS侍リューマ, "Kaizoku Zoro VS Samurai Ryūma"); 468. "Pirate Chopper vs. Mystery Man Hogback" (海賊チョッパーVS怪人ホグバック, "Kaizoku Choppā VS Kaijin Hogubakku"); 469. "Come Out Here, Straw Hat Pirates!" (出て来い麦わらの一味!!!, "Dete Koi Mugiwara no Ichimi!!!"); 470. "Oars vs. Straw Hat Pirates" (オーズVS麦わらの一味, "Ōzu VS Mugiwara no Ichimi")
Just when the Straw Hats start looking for Moria they run into Oars, the gigantic zombie who has been given Luffy's shadow. Before they deal with him, the crew splits up to get rid of the leaders of Moria's army. Sanji saves Nami from Absalom, Usopp defeats Perona, and Nico Robin and Chopper take care of Dr. Hogback. Zoro, meanwhile, fights the zombie that houses Brook's shadow, and when it is defeated Brook is restored to his former self. Their immediate objectives completed, the crew turns their attention to Oars.
49	Nightmare Luffy; Naitomea Rufi (ナイトメア・ルフィ)	March 4, 2008; 978-4-08-874485-8	June 1, 2010; 1-4215-3465-7
471. "My Friend" (私の友人, "Watashi no Yūjin"); 472. "Down" (ダウン, "Daun"); 473. "Warlord Bartholomew Kuma Appears" (王下七武海 バーソロミュー・くま現る, "Ōka Shichibukai Bāsoromyū Kuma Arawaru"); 474. "We Have to Do It!" (やるしかねェ!!!, "Yarushikanē!!!"); 475. "Pirates of the Forest" (森の海賊団, "Mori no Kaizoku-Dan"); 476. "Nightmare Luffy" (ナイトメア・ルフィ, "Naitomea Rufi"); 477. "3/8"; 478. "Luffy vs. Luffy" (ルフィVSルフィ, "Rufi VS Rufi"); 479. "Warrior of Hope" (希望の戦士, "Kibō no Senshi"); 480. "Interception" (迎撃, "Geigeki"); 481. "Shadows Asgard" (影の集合地, "Shadōzu Asugarudo")
While Luffy chases Moria across Thriller Bark, his crew does their best to defeat Oars. Though they almost succeed, Oars is quickly joined by Moria, who gives him the advantage he needs to decimate the crew. Luffy, unaware that Moria has joined Oars, runs into a group of pirates who have lost their shadows. Seeing Luffy as their hope for freedom, they provide him with the means to bring down Moria: a hundred shadows they have managed to take back from the island's zombies. Luffy engages Oars, and with the help of his crew, they finally defeat the giant. With Thriller Bark's course having been left unattended, the fog begins to thin and the sun begins to rise. Seeing this as an effective way to get rid of the Straw Hats, Moria absorbs all the island's shadows to kill time until sunrise.
50	Arriving Again; Futatabi Tadoritsuku (再び辿りつく)	June 4, 2008; 978-4-08-874521-3	June 1, 2010; 1-4215-3466-5
482. "Morning Is Coming" (朝が来る, "Asa ga Kuru"); 483. "The End of the Dream" (夢の終わり, "Yume no Owari"); 484. "Squish" (ぷに, "Puni"); 485. "Straw Hat Pirates—Pirate Hunter Zoro" (麦わらの一味・海賊狩りのゾロ, "Mugiwara no Ichimi - Kaizoku-Gari no Zoro"); 486. "Piano" (ピアノ); 487. "That Song" (あの唄, "Ano Uta"); 488. "Song of Life" (命の唄, "Inochi no Uta"); 489. "Eighth Person" (8人目, "Hachininme"); 490. "Arriving Again" (再び辿りつく, "Futatabi Tadoritsuku"); 491. "Flying Fish Riders" (トビウオライダーズ, "Tobiuo Raidāzu")
Moria, like Luffy before him, is given the strength of all the shadows he has absorbed. Moria, however, has absorbed more shadows than he can handle, and with each successful blow Luffy lands on him he loses some of the excess shadows. When Luffy drops the whole of Thriller Bark on him, Moria loses all of his shadows, which quickly return to their original owners. No longer fearing the sun, the Straw Hats and the inhabitants of Thriller Bark begin to celebrate, only to be cut short by the arrival of Bartholomew Kuma. A Warlord of the Sea, Kuma has been sent to take Luffy's head, something nobody on Thriller Bark will allow. Kuma easily deals with all of them, but before he can kill Luffy, Zoro convinces him to spare the Straw Hat captain. Kuma leaves and they resume their celebration. With Brook free to walk in the sun, he joins the Straw Hats in leaving Thriller Bark and moving on to their next adventure.
51	The Eleven Supernovas; Jūichinin no Chōshinsei (11人の超新星)	September 4, 2008; 978-4-08-874563-3	June 1, 2010; 1-4215-3467-3
492. "Iron Mask Duval" (鉄仮面のデュバル, "Tetsu Kamen no Dyubaru"); 493. "You Know Me" (知ってる, "Shitteru"); 494. "Duval's Tragedy" (デュバルの悲劇, "Dyubaru no Higeki"); 495. "Gaon Cannon" (ガオン砲, "Gaon Hō"); 496. "Yarukiman Mangrove" (ヤルキマン・マングローブ, "Yarukiman Mangurōbu"); 497. "Adventure on the Archipelago of Dancing Soap Bubbles" (シャボン舞う諸島の冒険, "Shabon Mau Shotō no Bōken"); 498. "The Eleven Supernovas" (11人の超新星, "Jūichinin no Chōshinsei"); 499. "Sabaody Park" (シャボンディパーク, "Shabondi Pāku"); 500. "The Embers of History" (歴史の残り火, "Rekishi no Nokoribi"); 501. "The World Begins to Swell" (うねり始める世界, "Uneri Hajimeru Sekai"); 502. "The Incident of the Celestial Dragons" (天竜人の一件, "Tenryūbito no Ikken")
The Straw Hats arrive at the halfway point of their adventure: the Red Line that splits the oceans in two. As pirates and thus enemies of the World Government, their only way to get through the divider is by traveling under the sea. When they meet Hatchan and his friend Camie, they learn of a man who can outfit their ship for an undersea voyage. They arrive at the archipelago where he resides and begin to search for him. While there they encounter the Celestial Dragons, the descendants of the founders of the World Government. Though angered by the Celestial Dragons' treatment of other people, Hatchan convinces the Straw Hats not to do anything, or risk the full wrath of the Government. As they continue their search, Camie is captured to be sold as a slave to the Celestial Dragons. In their attempt to rescue her Hatchan is shot by a Celestial Dragon, prompting Luffy to break his promise and punching the dragon in anger.
52	Roger and Rayleigh; Rojā to Reirī (ロジャーとレイリー)	December 4, 2008; 978-4-08-874602-9	June 1, 2010; 1-4215-3468-1
503. "Aggravated Island" (荒立つ島, "Aradatsu Shima"); 504. "Pirate Front Line on the Move!!" (海賊前線移動中!!, "Kaizoku Zensen Idōchū!!"); 505. "Kuma" (クマ); 506. "Roger and Rayleigh" (ロジャーとレイリー, "Rojā to Reirī"); 507. "Kizaru Arrives" (黄猿上陸, "Kizaru Jōriku"); 508. "Island of Carnage" (修羅の島, "Shura no Shima"); 509. "Kizaru vs. Four Captains" (黄猿VS4人の船長, "Kizaru VS Yonin no Senchō"); 510. "Straw Hat Pirates vs. War Machine" (麦わらの一味VS戦闘兵器, "Mugiwara no Ichimi VS Sentō Heiki"); 511. "Axe-Carrying Sentomaru" (鉞かついだ戦桃丸, "Masakari Katsuida Sentōmaru"); 512. "Zoro, Gone" (ゾロ、音沙汰なし, "Zoro, Otosata Nashi")
Having assaulted a Celestial Dragon, the Straw Hats have effectively declared war against the World Government. In doing so Silvers Rayleigh, the man they have searched for, decides to reveal himself to the Straw Hats. He frees Camie, attends to Hatchan, and leaves the others to deal with the approaching navy. With the help of some fellow pirate crews the Straw Hats are able to rendezvous with Rayleigh, the former first mate of the Pirate King. Optimistic that the Straw Hats will be able to emulate the Pirate king's successes, he agrees to outfit their ship. While waiting for him to finish the job, the Straw Hats must elude the navy that has been sent after them, something that proves difficult to do when they keep running into copies of Bartholomew Kuma. To complicate matters, they are found by Kizaru, a navy admiral who has effortlessly dealt with all the pirates who helped the Straw Hats earlier. Just as they are about to be defeated by the combined forces, Rayleigh and the real Kuma arrive to intervene.
53	Natural Born King; Ō no Shishitsu (王の資質)	March 4, 2009; 978-4-08-874640-1	June 1, 2010; 1-4215-3469-X
513. "Beyond Rescue!!!" (救えないっ!!!, "Sukuenaii!!!"); 514. "Body Parasite Mushrooms" (カラダカラキノコガハエルダケ, "Karadakarakinokogahaerudake"); 515. "Adventure on the Island of Women" (女ヶ島の冒険, "Nyōgashima no Bōken"); 516. "Pirate Empress Boa Hancock" (海賊女帝ボア・ハンコック, "Kaizoku Jotei Boa Hankokku"); 517. "Bath Time" (湯浴み, "Yuami"); 518. "Coliseum" (闘技台, "Tōgidai"); 519. "Natural Born King" (王の資質, "Ō no Shishitsu"); 520. "Eye of the Gorgon" (ゴルゴンの目, "Gorugon no Me"); 521. "Hoof of the Celestial Dragon" (天駆ける竜の蹄, "Ama Kakeru Ryū no Hizume"); 522. "Fatal Illness" (死に至る病, "Shi ni Itaru Yamai")
While Rayleigh distracts Kizaru, the real Kuma confronts every member of the Straw Hats in turn. Despite their best efforts to escape, Kuma defeats each of them and causes them to disappear. Some time later, Luffy appears on an island populated only by women. Although men are forbidden to set foot on it, Luffy is able to befriend some of the islanders. When Boa Hancock, the island's leader learns of Luffy's presence, she petrifies his new friends in stone as punishment and sentences Luffy to be executed. When he shows no concern for his own fate, and asks only that his friends be freed, Hancock falls in love with him and does as he asks. Now free to roam the island, Luffy hears that his brother, Portgas D. Ace, lost his earlier battle with Blackbeard and is to be executed by the World Government. Wanting to save him, Luffy asks Hancock to take him to the government prison, the Impel Down.
54	Unstoppable; Mō Dare ni mo Tomerarenai (もう誰にも止められない)	June 4, 2009; 978-4-08-874662-3	July 6, 2010; 1-4215-3470-3
523. "Hell" (地獄, "Jigoku"); 524. "Unstoppable" (もう誰にも止められない, "Mō Dare ni mo Tomerarenai"); 525. "The Underwater Prison Impel Down" (海底監獄インペルダウン, "Kaitei Kangoku Inperu Daun"); 526. "Adventure in the Great Prison" (大監獄の冒険, "Daikangoku no Bōken"); 527. "Level 1: Crimson Hell" (LV1 紅蓮地獄, "Reberu Wan Guren Jigoku"); 528. "Jimbei, First Son of the Sea" (海俠のジンベエ, "Kaikyō no Jinbē"); 529. "Level 2: Beast Hell" (LV2 猛獣地獄, "Reberu Tsū Mōjū Jigoku"); 530. "From One Hell to Another" (地獄へ地獄へ, "Jigoku e Jigoku e"); 531. "Level 3: Starvation Hell" (LV3 飢餓地獄, "Reberu Surī Kiga Jigoku"); 532. "Jailer Beast Minotaur" (獄卒獣ミノタウロス, "Gokusotsujū Minotaurosu")
As a pirate working for the World Government, Hancock is able to sneak Luffy into Impel Down. Luffy attempts to avoid drawing attention to himself, but meeting Buggy the Clown, the entire prison is alerted to his presence. Luffy and Buggy continue through the prison's first three levels, defeating any jailers they come across. At the same time, they reunite with other pirates Luffy has met in the past, recruiting them to help find Ace. With Ace's execution only a few hours away, the chief warden, Magellan, sets out to stop Luffy himself.
55	A Ray of Hope; Jigoku ni Okama (地獄に仏)	September 4, 2009; 978-4-08-874727-9	October 5, 2010; 1-4215-3471-1
533. "Level 4: Inferno Hell" (LV4 焦熱地獄, "Reberu Fō Shōnetsu Jigoku"); 534. "Warden Magellan vs. Pirate Luffy" (監獄署長マゼランVS海賊ルフィ, "Kangoku Shochō Mazeran VS Kaizoku Rufi"); 535. "Friend" (ダチ, "Dachi"); 536. "Level 5: Frozen Hell" (LV5 極寒地獄, "Reberu Faibu Gokkan Jigoku"); 537. "A Ray of Hope" (地獄に仏, "Jigoku ni Okama"); 538. "Level 5.5: New Kama Land" (LV5.5番地ニューカマーランド, "Reberu Go ten Go Banchi Nyūkamā Rando"); 539. "Emporio Energy Hormone" (エンポリオ・テンションホルモン, "Enporio Tenshon Horumon"); 540. "Level 6: Infinite Hell" (LV6 無限地獄, "Reberu Shikkusu Mugen Jigoku"); 541. "The Greatest Ever" (未だかつてナッシブル, "Imadakatsute Nasshiburu")
Luffy is found by Magellan, who uses his abilities to poison to bring Luffy to the brink of death. Luffy's old friend Bon Clay locates the inmate Emporio Ivankov to heal him, but his recovery takes several hours. When he wakes up he finds Ace has already been taken to Marine Headquarters for execution. Determined to save him, Luffy rallies the support of Iva and two of Impel Down's most dangerous prisoners: Sir Crocodile and Jimbei. Together they lead a prison break that spreads throughout Impel Down.
56	Thank You; Arigatō (ありがとう)	December 4, 2009; 978-4-08-874761-3	February 1, 2011; 978-1-4215-3850-1
542. "Yet Another Epic Incident" (やがて語られるもう一つの事件, "Yagate Katarareru Mō Hitotsu no Jiken"); 543. "Straw Hat and Blackbeard" (麦わらと黒ひげ, "Mugiwara to Kurohige"); 544. "The Lid to the Cauldron of Hell Opens" (地獄の釜の蓋もあく, "Jigoku no Kama no Futa mo Aku"); 545. "To Sunshine and Freedom" (陽のあたるシャバへ, "Hi no Ataru Shaba e"); 546. "Fish-man Pirate Captain Jimbei, Warlord of the Sea" (魚人海賊団船長"七武海"ジンベエ, "Gyojin Kaizoku-dan Senchō 'Shichibukai' Jinbē"); 547. "Island Ripper" (島破り, "Shimayaburi"); 548. "Thank You" (ありがとう, "Arigatō"); 549. "Battleship" (出撃の艦, "Shutsugeki no Fune"); 550. "Navy Headquarters" (海軍本部, "Kaigun Honbu"); 551. "Whitebeard of the Four Emperors" (四皇"白ひげ", "Yonkō 'Shirohige'")
The escaped prisoners make their way to Impel Down's exit, dealing with any prison guards who try to stop them. When Magellan begins to thin their numbers, Blackbeard arrives to help Luffy by holding him off. Even though he wants to take revenge on Blackbeard for Ace's capture, Luffy escapes with the other inmates. They procure a boat and set sail for Marine headquarters. Bon Clay stays behind to grant them passage. Meanwhile, with Ace's execution imminent, the reason for his death is given. He is not being executed because he is a leading member of Whitebeard's pirate crew, but because he is the real son of the Pirate King Gol D. Roger.
57	Paramount War; Chōjō Kessen (頂上決戦)	March 4, 2010; 978-4-08-870010-6	June 7, 2011; 1-4215-3851-2
552. "Ace and Whitebeard" (エースと白ひげ, "Ēsu to Shirohige"); 553. "Paramount War" (頂上決戦, "Chōjō Kessen"); 554. "Admiral Akainu" (大将赤犬, "Taishō Akainu"); 555. "Oars and the Hat" (オーズと笠, "Ōzu to Kasa"); 556. "Justice Will Prevail" (正義は勝つ!!, "Seigi wa Katsu!!"); 557. "Luffy and Whitebeard" (ルフィと白ひげ, "Rufi to Shirohige"); 558. "Little Brother" (弟, "Otōto"); 559. "Destiny" (天命, "Tenmei"); 560. "Prisoners of Impel Down" (インペルダウンの囚人達, "Inperu Daun no Shūjin-Tachi"); 561. "Luffy vs. Mihawk" (ルフィVSミホーク, "Rufi VS Mihōku"); 562. "Whirl Spider Squard" (海賊大渦蜘蛛スクアード, "Kaizoku Ōuzugumo Sukuādo")
Whitebeard, the strongest man of the world's pirates, arrives with his forces to free Ace. As he and the navy begin their war to decide Ace's fate, the world watches the events of the battle unfold on television. Whitebeard's pirates are slow to gain any ground, and it is not until the arrival of Luffy and the other Impel Down escapees that they are able to break through the navy's barricade. In an effort to eliminate all of them, the navy boxes the pirates in and cuts off the telecast, wanting to keep the world from witnessing the coming slaughter.
58	The Name of This Era Is "Whitebeard"; Kono Jidai no Na o "Shirohige" to Yobu (この時代の名を"白ひげ"と呼ぶ)	June 4, 2010; 978-4-08-870045-8	September 13, 2011; 1-4215-3926-8
563. "One Man, One Heart" (心臓一つ 人間一人, "Shinzō Hitotsu - Ningen Hitori"); 564. "The Man Who Shook the World" (世界を揺らす男, "Sekai o Yurasu Otoko"); 565. "Oars's Path" (オーズの道, "Ōzu no Michi"); 566. "Raid" (猛攻, "Mōkō"); 567. "Marineford Navy Headquarters—Oris Plaza" (マリンフォード海軍本部オリス広場, "Marinfōdo Kaigun Honbu Orisu Hiroba"); 568. "Have It Your Way!" (勝手にしやがれ, "Katte ni Shiyagare"); 569. "White Monster" (白い怪物, "Shiroi Kaibutsu"); 570. "The Bridge of Life" (命の懸橋, "Inochi no Kakehashi"); 571. "The Execution Platform" (処刑台, "Shokeidai"); 572. "The Times They Are A-Changin'" (The Times They Are A-Changin' —時代は変わる—, "The Times They Are A-Changin' - Jidai wa Kawaru"); 573. "The Name of This Era Is 'Whitebeard'" (この時代の名を"白ひげ"と呼ぶ, "Kono Jidai no Na o 'Shirohige' to Yobu")
The pirates suffer heavy casualties. Whitebeard goes on the offensive, using his ability to create earthquakes to protect his men, but he too is mortally wounded. Despite the insurmountable odds, Luffy continues trying to reach Ace. His resolve causes the pirates to rally around him, giving him enough support to finally reach and rescue his brother. Having succeeded, the pirates begin to retreat and the navy, determined not to completely lose control of the situation, focuses their efforts on stopping Luffy and Ace. The worldwide telecast is restored just as Ace is dealt a fatal blow protecting Luffy from Admiral Akainu.
59	The Death of Portgas D. Ace; Pōtogasu Dī Ēsu Shisu (ポートガス・D・エース死す)	August 4, 2010; 978-4-08-870083-0	December 6, 2011; 978-1-4215-3959-1
574. "The Death of Portgas D. Ace" (ポートガス・D・エース死す, "Pōtogasu Dī Ēsu Shisu"); 575. "Voiceless Rage" (言葉なき怒り, "Kotobanaki Ikari"); 576. "The Great Pirate Edward Newgate" (大海賊エドワード・二ューゲート,, "Daikaizoku Edowādo Nyūgēto"); 577. "Outrageous Events One After Another" (畳み掛ける大事件, "Tatamikakeru Daijiken"); 578. "A Gift for the New Era" (新時代へ贈るもの, "Shinjidai e Okurumono"); 579. "A Few Seconds of Courage" (勇気ある数秒, "Yūki Aru Sūbyō"); 580. "The War's Conclusion" (終戦, "Shūsen"); 581. "Creeping Future" (忍び寄る未来, "Shinobiyoru Mirai"); 582. "Luffy and Ace" (ルフィとエース, "Rufi to Ēsu"); 583. "Gray Terminal" (不確かな物の終着駅, "Gurei Tāminaru"); 584. "Incident with Porchemy" (ポルシェーミの一件, "Porushēmi no Ikken")
Ace dies from his injuries. Luffy is devastated by the loss and the pirates, having failed to rescue Ace, flee. Whitebeard tries to avenge Ace and takes down Akainu and destroying the Marine Headquarters, but he is killed by Blackbeard and his own crew of Impel Down escapees. Blackbeard absorbs Whitebeard's ability to create earthquakes and uses it to lay waste to Marine Headquarters. When the battle turns into a battle royale between Blackbeard, the navy, and the retreating pirates, Koby, Luffy's friend in the Marines, and Luffy's childhood idol Red-Haired Shanks, intervene and convinces all sides to stop fighting. As the world comes to grips with all that happened during the war, Hancock takes Luffy back to the island of women to recover. Luffy spends his time there reflecting on how he, Ace, and a boy named Sabo, have come to consider each other brothers despite having completely different backgrounds.
60	My Little Brother; Otōto yo (弟よ)	November 4, 2010; 978-4-08-870125-7	January 3, 2012; 978-1-4215-4085-6
585. "Brotherly Pact" (兄弟盃, "Kyōdai Sakazuki"); 586. "City of Stench" (悪臭のする町, "Akushū no suru Machi"); 587. "I Will Never Run Away" (おれは、逃げない, "Ore wa, Nigenai"); 588. "Sabo's Ocean" (サボの海, "Sabo no Umi"); 589. "Will of the Winds" (風雲の志, "Fūun no Kokorozashi"); 590. "My Little Brother" (弟よ, "Otōto yo"); 591. "Are You Sure About That?" (それでいいのか, "Sore de Ii no ka"); 592. "Cheer" (エール, "Ēru"); 593. "NEWS"; 594. "Message" (メッセージ, "Messēji")
After Sabo is assumed to have been killed by a Celestial Dragon for being "human garbage", Luffy and Ace vow to look out for each other always. With Ace now dead, Luffy believes he has nothing to live for. When he remembers that he still has his crew, Luffy makes plans to go return to the archipelago where they were last together. Rayleigh, having tracked Luffy down, advises against this; not only would they be defeated again, but the World Government is now after Luffy because of his recent actions. Rayleigh suggests an alternative approach. They go and briefly assault Marine Headquarters, something that becomes a major news story. The other Straw Hats, having been sent to different parts of the world by Kuma, quickly learn of this and find hidden meaning in Luffy's return.

== Lists of main series chapters ==
- List of One Piece chapters 1 to 186
- List of One Piece chapters 187 to 388
- List of One Piece chapters 595 to 806
- List of One Piece chapters 807 to 1015
- List of One Piece chapters 1016 to now

== See also ==
- List of One Piece media
