= One Piece season 10 =

One Piece
- Season 10; Thriller Bark
- The cover of the first DVD compilation released by Avex Mode of the tenth season.
- No. of episodes: 45

Release
- Original network: Fuji Television
- Original release: January 6 – December 14, 2008

Season chronology
- ← Previous; Season 9 Next → Season 11

The tenth season of the One Piece anime series was produced by Toei Animation, and directed by Munehisa Sakai based on Eiichiro Oda's manga by the same name. It deals with the meeting and recruitment of Brook in a mysterious mist. There, the crew comes across Thriller Bark captained by Gecko Moria, one of the Seven Warlords of the Sea who uses shadows to create a crew of zombies.

The season aired on Fuji Television from January 6, through December 14, 2008, lasting 45 episodes. Thirteen compilations of the season has been released so far as of July 7, 2010 The first DVD release for the season was released on October 7, 2009. Beginning with episode 380, the Japanese analog broadcasts are presented in a letterbox format in 16:9.

The season uses two pieces of theme music. The first opening theme, titled "Jungle P", is performed by 5050. The second opening theme, starting with episode 373 onwards, is a cover of the series' first opening "We Are!" (ウィーアー!) by Hiroshi Kitadani, as "We Are! (One Piece Animation 10th Anniversary ver.)" (ウィーアー! 〜アニメーション ワンピース10周年Ver.〜, Wī Ā! Animēshon Wan Pīsu Juushūnen Ver.), performed by TVXQ.

The Funimation English dub of the first 12 episodes were originally going to be released in May 2014, but was delayed until September to coincide with the release of the Funimation dub of One Piece Film: Z.

== Episodes ==
No. overall	No. in season	Title	Directed by	Written by	Original release date	English air date
Thriller Bark
337	1	"The Mysterious Skeleton Floating Through The Fog! Venture into The Devil's Sea"; Transliteration: "Ma no Umi Totsunyū! Kiri ni Ukabu Nazo no Gaikotsu" (Japanese: 魔の海突入! 霧に浮かぶ謎のガイコツ)	Yoshihiro Ueda	Hirohiko Kamisaka	January 6, 2008	March 13, 2016
In search of food, the Straw Hats attempt octopus hunting before discovering a barrel in the middle of the ocean. After opening the barrel, with fireworks launched from it, the Thousand Sunny gets thrown into the foggy Florian Triangle where it encounters a ruined ship with a living skeleton on it. While the others are unnerved, Luffy boards the ship with Sanji and Nami where they find the skeleton. After the skeleton introduces himself as Brook, Luffy immediately asks him to join the crew.
338	2	"The Joy of Seeing People! The Gentleman Skeleton’s True Identity!"; Transliteration: "Hito ni Aeta Yorokobi! Gaikotsu Shinshi no Shōtai" (Japanese: 人に逢えた喜び! ガイコツ紳士の正体)	Directed by : Hiroyuki Satō; Storyboarded by : Naotoshi Shida	Tsuyoshi Sakurai	January 13, 2008	March 20, 2016
On board the Thousand Sunny, with everyone save Luffy unnerved by his appearance as an undead creature, Brook reveals that he is actually a human with Devil Fruit powers. Brook explains that he was a pirate musician before being killed alongside his shipmates when they were attacked. Though the Revive-Revive fruit he ate prior brought him back to life, it took his disembodied soul a year to find his body which has decayed within that period of time. When everyone notices Brook's lack of a reflection, the skeleton reveals that his shadow stolen and cannot enter sunlight without being destroyed. For that reason, admitting his joy to be around others after a very long time of solitude, Brook turns down Luffy's offer to both join his crew and offers to play for the Straw Hats while he is able to enjoy their company. But a ghost suddenly appears in the galley, and the Straw Hats find out from a frightened Brook that the barrel they found prior was a trap as they find themselves targeted and on the ghost isle Thriller Bark.
339	3	"One Unnatural Phenomenon After the Next! Disembarking on Thriller Bark!"; Transliteration: "Kai Genshō Zokuzoku! Surirābāku Jōriku" (Japanese: 怪現象ぞくぞく! スリラーバーク上陸)	Sumio Watanabe	Takuya Masumoto	January 20, 2008	March 27, 2016
Brook bids farewell to the Straw Hats and leaps overboard, revealing that the lightness of his body allows him to dash across the ocean's surface. Nami, Usopp, and Chopper sail out to explore the island using the Mini-Merry II, ending up getting knocked onto land before they are chased by a patchwork cerberus that is a third fox. Back on the ship, the remaining crew members are harassed by an invisible creature. After fleeing the cerberus, Nami, Usopp, and Chopper encounter Hildon, a vampiric creature who offers to take them to the mansion of Doctor Hogback.
340	4	"The Man Called a Genius! Hogback Makes His Appearance!"; Transliteration: "Tensai to Yobareta Otoko! Hogubakku Arawaru!" (Japanese: 天才と呼ばれた男! ホグバック現る!)	Katsumi Tokoro	Yoshiyuki Suga	January 27, 2008	April 3, 2016
Usopp, Nami and Chopper traverse through the forest of Thriller Bark, Chopper revealing Doctor Hogback to be a famous surgeon and expressing excitement to see him. But when the group have second thoughts of heading towards Hogback's manor, due to the strange creatures roaming the wood, Hildon is nowhere to be seen before being attacked by a platoon of zombies that drive them towards the direction of the manor. While immediately hospitable, despite the manners of his female assistant Victoria Cindry, Hogback starts acting strange after it is mentioned that Brook has arrived on the island. The Thousand Sunny, meanwhile, gets caught in a giant spiderweb.
341	5	"Nami’s in a Major Pinch! The Zombie Mansion and the Invisible Man!"; Transliteration: "Nami Daipinchi! Zonbi Yashiki to Tōmei Ningen" (Japanese: ナミ大ピンチ! ゾンビ屋敷と透明人間)	Tetsuya Endō	Isao Murayama	February 3, 2008	April 10, 2016
After the meeting with Hogback, who frightens Chopper by insisting that no one is allowed in his laboratory, Nami takes a shower with Usopp and Chopper outside while musing her thoughts on their situation. But Nami finds herself restrained by an invisible man in the shower, the figure fleeing when Usopp and Chopper manage to drive him off. The invisible man meets with Hogback and the ghost, referred as Perona, to discuss what to do with the Straw Hats. As the rest of the crew set foot on Thriller Bark, Luffy taming the cerberus as the group encounter more zombie creatures, Nami, Usopp, and Chopper attempt to leave the manor. But the trio instead find themselves surrounded by the Surprise Zombies: zombies that strike from paintings, taxidermied heads, and even floor rugs.
342	6	"The Zombie’s Secret! Hogback’s Nightmarish Laboratory!"; Transliteration: "Zonbi no Nazo! Akumu no Hogubakku Kenkyūsho" (Japanese: ゾンビの謎! 悪夢のホグバック研究所)	Directed by : Hiroshi Matsuzaka; Storyboarded by : Kenji Yokoyama	Tsuyoshi Sakurai	February 10, 2008	April 17, 2016
While evading the Surprise Zombies upon finding a secret passage, Nami, Chopper and Usopp discover the truth about Victoria Cindry being a starlet who died long ago. They eventually found the door to Hogback's laboratory, observing the scientist from outside before they are found by a mysterious samurai zombie who sounds like Brook. Meanwhile, Luffy's group are ambushed by ghosts who briefly made them depressed before they reach the graveyard where they are ambushed by the zombies.
343	7	"His Name is Moria! The Great Shadow-Seizing Pirate's Trap!"; Transliteration: "Sono Na wa Moria! Kage o Nigiru Daikaizoku no Wana" (Japanese: その名はモリア! 影を握る大海賊の罠)	Yoshihiro Ueda	Koga Naoki	February 17, 2008	April 24, 2016
After beating the zombies, planting them into the ground upon learning they ambushed Nami, Usopp and Chopper, Luffy's group encounter an old man who pleas for their help in regaining his stolen shadow. The old man reveals his shadow and those of his fellow castaways was stolen by Gecko Moria, whom Robin explained to be one of the Seven Warlords of the Sea. Luffy agrees to help as he and his group reach the manor, learning that Thriller Bark is actually a giant pirate ship. Inside the manor, though furious to find Nami, Usopp and Chopper in his lab after they were knocked in by the General Zombie Ryuma, Hogback sees no point in being upset as it is almost midnight. As midnight draws near, Absalom rallies the zombies together while the negativity-inducing ghosts converge into their master, a Gothic Lolita-style Ghost Princess named Perona. Gecko Moria, a massive, giant-like man, is awoken and informed of the Straw Hats' arrival before declaring the start of the Night Hunt.
344	8	"Feast of the Zombie Song! The Night Raid's Bell is the Sound of Darkness!"; Transliteration: "Zonbi Songu no Kyōen! Yōchi no Kane wa Yami no Oto" (Japanese: ゾンビ歌の饗宴! 夜討ちの鐘は闇の音)	Directed by : Hiroyuki Satō; Storyboarded by : Naotoshi Shida	Hirohiko Kamisaka	February 24, 2008	May 1, 2016
Usopp, Nami and Chopper are effortlessly incapacitated by Ryuma and locked inside a coffin. Luffy and the others enter the mansion and defeat the Surprise Zombies with ease, but Sanji goes missing, so they force Oinkchuck to act as their guide by taking him with them. While the zombies of Thriller Bark celebrate the start of the Night Raid, Absalom awakens the other General Zombies to handle the Straw Hats.
345	9	"A Bunch of Animals? Perona's Wonder Garden!"; Transliteration: "Dōbutsu Ippai? Perōna no Wandāgāden" (Japanese: 動物いっぱい? ペローナの不思議の庭)	Sumio Watanabe	Yoshiyuki Suga	March 2, 2008	May 8, 2016
After awakening the General Zombies, Absalom is accosted by Lola, a zombie warhog obsessed with making him her husband. After learning that he's chosen Nami to be his bride, Lola sets her sights on the navigator. Nami, Usopp, and Chopper manage to escape their coffin and find themselves in a garden, surrounded by animal zombies, including a bizarre penguin-bulldog zombie named Inuppe who talks and acts a lot like Sanji. The other Straw Hats, meanwhile, discover a hallway lined with suits of armor, and realize that Zoro is now missing as well.
346	10	"The Vanishing Straw Hat Crew! A Mysterious Swordsman Appears!"; Transliteration: "Kieru Mugiwara Ichimi! Arawareta Nazo no Kenshi!" (Japanese: 消える麦わら一味! 現れた謎の剣士!)	Katsumi Tokoro	Takuya Masumoto	March 9, 2008	May 15, 2016
As Perona makes her way to the Thousand Sunny to get the Straw Hats' treasure while Absalom attempts to stop Lola from hunting Nami, who realizes Innupe's uncanniness to Sanji, Luffy, Robin, and Franky are lured by Oinkchuck into a room where they are forced to face an army of armored General Zombies. Though they are able to handle them, the three Straw Hats decide that evading them is top priority. But while Franky and Robin escaped, Luffy's route was blocked by a zombie swordsman named Jigoro who acts much like Zoro. Luffy is captured by the zombie forces, with Franky and Robin surrounded by both sides by the generals and a massive monkey-spider named Taralan.
347	11	"Chivalry Remains! The Traitorous Zombie Protects Nami!"; Transliteration: "Nokoru Kishidō! Nami o Mamoru Uragiri Zonbi" (Japanese: 残る騎士道! ナミを守る裏切りゾンビ)	Hiroaki Miyamoto	Koga Naoki	March 16, 2008	May 22, 2016
Despite Absalom's attempts to halt Lola and abduct Nami to be her bride, both intents failed as the latter flees from Lola with Usopp and Chopper unable to slow the warthog zombie down. While the Wild Zombies disrespected his orders for them to not harm Nami, Absalom puts the lot in their place while venting his bad mode on Inuppe by blasting him into a wall for his insolence. At the same time, Franky and Robin buy some time against the Taralan and the General Zombies by the former destroying the bridge to trap the zombies in the courtyard while Robin flies them to the area of the castle behind Taralan. As Taralan was about to pursue them, Brook suddenly falls from the sky.
348	12	"Appearing from the Sky! That Man Is the Humming Swordsman!"; Transliteration: "Sora kara Sanjō! Kenkyō Hanauta wa Ano Otoko!" (Japanese: 空から参上! 剣狭ハナウタはあの男!)	Directed by : Hiroyuki Satō; Storyboarded by : Munehisa Sakai	Isao Murayama	March 23, 2008	June 5, 2016
When Usopp and Chopper are unable to halt Lola, Nami manages to quell the warthog's bloodlust by claiming to be a male crossdresser while encouraging her to take more violent steps in getting Absalom's affections. But when Absalom manages to evade Lola, Nami, Usopp, and Chopper hide inside Perona's servant Kumacy who is unable to reveal the pirates' location as they overhear Absalom and Perona talking about being summoned by Moria as he obtained an ideal shadow for his ultimate Special Zombie: "Straw Hat" Luffy. Meanwhile, after their enemy used his webs to reach them, Franky gets the upper hand against Taralan until Robin is immobilized by the Spider Mice, the ones behind the abductions of Sanji and Zoro. Luckily, Brook jumped up to help the two pirates, promising to tell them the full story while easily defeating Taralan.
349	13	"Luffy's Emergency Situation! The Ultimate Shadow's Destination!"; Transliteration: "Rufi Kinkyūjitai! Saikyō no Kage no Ikisaki!" (Japanese: ルフィ緊急事態! 最強の影の行き先!)	Yutaka Nakashima	Yoshiyuki Suga	March 30, 2008	June 12, 2016
After defeating Taralan and releasing his shadow soul from within, Brook explains to Robin and Franky the truth that the zombies of Thriller Bark are actually corpses animated by shadows taken by Gecko Moria from his victims via the power of his Shadow-Shadow Fruit. Meanwhile, Moria meets with the rest of the Mysterious Four (as well as the hidden Straw Hats in Kumacy) where he uses his powers to steal Luffy's shadow to put in his Special Zombie.
350	14	"The Warrior Known As the "Devil"!! The Moment of Oars' Revival"; Transliteration: "Majin to Yobareta Senshi!! Ōzu Fukkatsu no Toki" (Japanese: 魔人と呼ばれた戦士!! オーズ復活の時)	Tetsuya Endō	Tsuyoshi Sakurai	April 20, 2008	June 19, 2016
With Luffy's shadow in his hands, Moria and his followers head into the freezer holding his ultimate special zombie that he believes will help him gain power in the New World: the massive ancient warrior known as Oars. At the same time Brook parts ways from Franky and Robin after giving further crucial advice regarding the zombies, and answering Franky's request, so he can go forth to accomplish his own goal: defeating the zombie Ryuma and reclaiming his shadow from the samurai fencer.
351	15	"Awakening After 500 Years!! Oars Opens His Eyes!!"; Transliteration: "Gohyakunen Buri no Mezame!! Ōzu Kaigan!!" (Japanese: 500年ぶりの目覚め!! オーズ開眼!!)	Yoshihiro Ueda	Takuya Masumoto	April 27, 2008	June 26, 2016
With Usopp, Chopper and Nami bearing witness, Moria implants Luffy's shadow inside the corpse of Oars. Within moments, the massive zombie comes to life with three Straw Hats discovered by Moria's gang. Luckily, Oars immediately displaying aspects of Luffy's personality by yelling out for food, the three Straw Hat pirates escape in midst of the giant's revival. However, they do not get far as Nami is abducted by Absalom for the marriage he plans for her while Usopp and Chopper are left to fend for themselves against numerous platoons of zombies before being rescued by Franky and Robin.
352	16	"A Belief Worth Begging to Live for!! Brook Defends His Afro"; Transliteration: "Shinnen no Inochigoi!! Afuro o Mamoru Burukku" (Japanese: 信念の命乞い!! アフロを守るブルック)	Sumio Watanabe	Yoshiyuki Suga	May 4, 2008	July 10, 2016
Brook confronts Ryuma, recalling his time on Thriller Bark five years prior - and his first battle with Ryuma and how he lost to a zombie with his own shadow. Ryuma mocks Brook for being so careful about his afro, and the two engage in another battle. Oars meanwhile continues to exhibit Luffy's personality traits as he devours most of Thriller Bark's food while declaring his desire to be King of the Pirates.
353	17	"A Man's Promise Never Dies!! To the Friend Waiting Under the Distant Sky"; Transliteration: "Otoko no Chikai wa Shinazu!! Tōi Sora de Matsu Tomo e" (Japanese: 男の誓いは死なず!! 遠い空で待つ友へ)	Directed by : Hiroshi Matsuzaka; Storyboarded by : Naotoshi Shida	Hirohiko Kamisaka	May 11, 2008	July 17, 2016
Usopp, Chopper, Robin and Franky return to the Sunny, discovering their ship had been ransacked before waking up Luffy, Zoro and Sanji. After informing the three about their current status and Nami's abduction, Franky reveals that he asked Brook before they parted way of is what driving him as he could not really return to society due to his appearance. Brook reveals that he and his crew made a promise to return to Reverse Mountain where they left a valuable friend fifty years ago. Luffy, Zoro, Usopp, and Sanji are astonished to find out that friend Brook referred to is none other than the giant whale Laboon.
354	18	"I Swear to Go See Him! Brook and the Cape of Promise"; Transliteration: "Kanarazu Ai ni Iku!! Burukku to Yakusoku no Misaki" (Japanese: 必ず会いに行く!! ブルックと約束の岬)	Takahiro Imamura	Hirohiko Kamisaka	May 18, 2008	July 24, 2016
Luffy, Usopp, Sanji, and Zoro tell the rest of the crew how they got to meet Laboon as they started their new journey, while Brook reflects on his promise to return to Laboon amidst his duel with Ryuma. Luffy declares his intention to make Brook a part of their crew and the Straw Hats prepare to counterattack the forces of Thriller Bark in order to reclaim all what was stolen from them.
355	19	"Food, Nami and Shadows!! Luffy's Enraged Counterattack"; Transliteration: "Meshi to Nami to Kage!! Luffi Ikari no Daihangeki" (Japanese: メシとナミと影!! ルフィ怒りの大反撃)	Katsumi Tokoro	Koga Naoki	May 25, 2008	July 31, 2016
After Luffy made up his mind to recruit Brook's story with the others supporting him, the Straw Hats decide to mount an assault on Thriller Bark to reclaim their stolen shadows and Nami. While Sanji is joined by Robin to save Nami, wanting to kill Absalom after being further provoked and exploded his infernal rage by Usopp, Franky and Zoro decide to back up Brook against Ryuma while Luffy intends to directly defeat Gecko Moria himself in order to regain all the stolen shadows. At that time, as Oars explores the mast of Thriller Bark, Hogback is informed of the Straw Hats mounting an assault and livid that Absalom removed the General Zombies from the field to be his wedding guests. While Hogback receives Moria's permission to take command of Absalom's zombie servants, having two enforcers in mind, Perona uses her Negative Hollows to stop Luffy and Sanji in their tracks. But before Perona can get the rest, Oars falls from the mast onto the stairs, cutting Luffy, Chopper and Robin from Usopp and Sanji as they fall down below to where Zoro and Franky are. Zoro and Franky are then formally introduced to Oars after Usopp comes to and finds the two taking down what they thought was a wall.
356	20	"Usopp's the Strongest? Leave Anything Negative to Him"; Transliteration: "Usoppu Saikyō? Negateibu wa Makasetoke" (Japanese: ウソップ最強? ネガティブは任せとけ)	Yutaka Nakashima	Takuya Masumoto	June 1, 2008	August 7, 2016
Luffy continues on to take on Moria while Chopper and Robin remain behind to take on Hogback who sics Jigoro and Inuppe on them. After Oars runs off with a new pirate hat from his destruction, his actions disrupting Absalom as his wedding to Nami is almost complete, the remainder of the crew end up in Perona's room where she uses her negative powers on them. But Usopp reveals that he's immune to her attacks due his negative personality, staying behind to take on the Ghost Princess while the others continue towards Absalom and Ryuma.
357	21	"The General Zombies Are Down in a Flash!! Oars Feels Like an Adventure!!"; Transliteration: "Jeneraru Zonbi Shunsetsu!! Ōzu wa Bōken Kibun!!" (Japanese: 将軍ゾンビ瞬殺!! オーズは冒険気分!!)	Tetsuya Endō	Tsuyoshi Sakurai	June 8, 2008	August 14, 2016
As Usopp continues to stand up to Perona's Negative Hollows while wiping out Wild Zombies, Brook is greatly overpowered by Ryuma was about to defeat the skeleton when Zoro arrives. Meanwhile, Oars continues to cause chaos on Thriller Bark, forcing Absalom to send his entire General Zombie audience to stop him. But Abolsom learns that Oars annihilated all of the General Zombies with a "Non-Gum-Gum" Gatling before Sanji arrives, Luffy has finally have found Gecko Moria and expressing his intent to beat him up.
358	22	"Blazing Knight Sanji!! Kick Down the Fake Wedding"; Transliteration: "Honō no Naito Sanji!! Keri Tsubuse Itsuwari no Kyoshiki" (Japanese: 炎の騎士サンジ!! 蹴り潰せ偽りの挙式)	Sumio Watanabe	Yoshiyuki Suga	June 15, 2008	August 21, 2016
As Luffy finds himself facing Gecko Moria's animated shadow Doppelman while attempting to attack Moria, Usopp manages to dispatch the Wild Zombies and chases after a frighten Perona with Kumacy chasing after him. Though Absalom initially believed Sanji to not be a threat as he easily dispatched Inuppe, he is shocked that the pirate able to actual due harm to his heavily modified body. Having placed Nami's unconscious body on a pew, Sanji, in a infernal rage exploded state, explains that he has more of a beef with Absalom besides his pevertived actions against the women in his crew.
359	23	"A Clear-Clear History? Sanji's Stolen Dream"; Transliteration: "Suke Suke no Innen? Ubawareta Sanji no Yume" (Japanese: スケスケの因縁? 奪われたサンジの夢)	Yoshihiro Ueda	Takuya Masumoto	June 22, 2008	August 28, 2016
Beating Absalom when he refused to reveal he has been using firearms, Sanji reveals that he knows Absalom's invisibility due to the Clear-Clear Fruit which he wanted for his own reasons. As Sanji hardly defeats Absalom, Luffy managed to get through Doppleman to land a hit on Gecko Moria with his Gum-Gum Stamp. At the same time, losing sight of Perona, Usopp finally manages to give Kumacy the slip before finding a more confident Perona floating in mid air out the window.
360	24	"Save Me, Hero!! My Enemy Is the Immortal Princess"; Transliteration: "Tasukete Hīrō!! Teki wa Fujimi no Purinsesu" (Japanese: 助けて英雄!! 敵は不死身のプリンセス)	Directed by : Makoto Sonoda; Storyboarded by : Naotoshi Shida	Hirohiko Kamisaka	June 29, 2008	September 11, 2016
Usopp is forced to go through a gauntlet of Perona's Horo-Horo Fruit powers, including an untouchable body, size manipulation, passing right through him and creating explosive mini-Hollows that slowly rip away at his stamina and body. Temporarily turning into Sniperking to finally dispatch Kumacy, Usopp is forced up against a desperate wall until he finally realizes Perona's sudden change. Usopp uses one of his attacks to destroy a nearby wall, revealing Perona's body lying helplessly in her bedroom.
361	25	"Perona Is Terrified!! Usopp and Untruthful Share the Same "U""; Transliteration: "Perona Kyōfu!! Uso no U wa Usoppu no U" (Japanese: ペローナ恐怖!! 嘘のウはウソップのウ)	Tetsuya Endō	Koga Naoki	July 6, 2008	September 18, 2016
Having deduced that Perona used her Horo-Horo powers to project her spirit, Usopp attempts to fire an attack at it. But the attack appeared to miss with Perona producing a Special Hollow bomb to hold Usopp while she returned to her body. Usopp luckily uses an Impact Dial to absorb the explosive force, using it to take out the Wild Zombie Hippo Gentleman with some injury as consequence. Usopp then reveals that he actually fired an adhesive on Perona's body, beating her by scaring the trapped girl to unconscious with toy cockroaches and an inflatable ten-ton hammer. As Chopper begins to notice Jigoro and Inuppe acting less like Zoro and Sanji, Oars undergoes the same transition and makes his way back to Gecko Moria. Meanwhile, Zoro and Ryuma's fight is getting intense as Brook tells Franky that Ryuma is actually fighting for real.
362	26	"Slashes Dancing On the Rooftop!! Showdown: Zoro vs. Ryuma!"; Transliteration: "Yane ni Mau Zangeki!! Ketchaku Zoro VS Ryūma" (Japanese: 屋根に舞う斬撃!! 決着ゾロVSリューマ)	Yoshihiro Ueda	Yoshiyuki Suga	July 13, 2008	September 25, 2016
Five minutes before the fight ends on the rooftop, Zoro duels Ryuma in Hogback's lab while Franky guards over the injured Brook. Neither Zoro, nor Ryuma, can gain any advantage over the other, as they keep matching the other's attack. Their attacks quickly destroy the lab, forcing them to escape the room and continue their fierce duel on the roof. As Brook watches on, he realized that Ryuma was holding back in their fights. After an intense sword fight, during which the entire roof collapses to the ground below, Zoro finally defeats Ryuma using a technique which sets him ablaze. Zoro lands hard on the lip of the roof below. Ryuma manages to land on a higher ledge, staggering while throwing his sword Shunsui to Zoro as acknowledgement of his opponent's skills. Ryuma collapses in a bout of flames and Brook's shadow is finally returned to him, to his greatest joy. Zoro acknowledges Ryuma's skill as a swordsman and says he wishes he could have met Ryuma before he died. He also agrees to forget the outcome of their fight.
363	27	"Chopper Is Furious!! Hogback's Evil Medical Practices"; Transliteration: "Choppā Gekido!! Hogubakku Ma no Ijutsu" (Japanese: チョッパー激怒!! ホグバック魔の医術)	Yutaka Nakashima	Hirohiko Kamisaka	July 20, 2008	October 2, 2016
Chopper and Robin are outmatched by Jigoro and Inuppe, whose personalities lost most semblance to Zoro and Sanji. Chopper tells Hogback that he had once respected him, but does not anymore after realizing the true nature of Hogbacks experiments. But Hogback, revealing that his research was only for his benefit, insists his zombies are alive as he used Cindry as an example by kicking her to the floor to lick it. Then explaining the room Chopper, Usopp, and Nami found was his, Hogback then tells his story of how he met Cindry and fell in love with the performer. But both the revelation of Cindry having a fiancé and her accidental death on stage made negative impacts on Hogback as he is approached by Moria. Hogback agreed to join his cause on the condition that he can revive her a zombie. Hogback admits that the zombified Cindry lack her original personality, but he only desired her beauty and assumes she is happy to be alive. This infuriates Chopper so much as he refuses to allow Hogback to continue making everyone suffer, the scientist ordering Cindry to kill the intruders so he can use their corpses in his experiments. Though Cindry is revealed to have modified superhuman strength, she is nearly exposed to salt after Chopper yells that real humans have freedom. When Hogback orders Jigoro and Inuppe to kill everyone to protect Cindry, the two zombies ended up fighting each other before Robin tricks Hogback into ordering the two to jump out the tower. With Chopper intending to beat Hogback to a bloody pulp, the scientist orders Cindry to buy time for him to escape. But everyone is surprised to see a tearful Cindry as she revealed she could not move. Elsewhere, Oars finally returns to Moria's side.
364	28	"Oars Roars! Come Out, Straw Hat Crew"; Transliteration: "Ōzu Hoeru!! Dete Koi Mugiwara no Ichimi" (Japanese: オーズ吼える!! 出て来い麦わらの一味)	Yukihiko Nakao	Takuya Masumoto	August 3, 2008	October 9, 2016
With Oars now a fully obedient zombie, Gecko Moria takes his leave while instructing the giant to hunt down the Straw Hat pirates whose wanted posters are sewn on his arm. Oars attacks Luffy before he escapes to chase after Moria. Hogback without Cindry's conflicted support tries to run away, only to caught by Chopper as Robin helps him set up a suplex before Oars's attack smashed through the ceiling. Hogback then ends up being crushed under Oars's foot before the giant crushes into the chapel as Absalom takes advantage of Sanji's shock to spirit Nami away. Robin and Chopper meet up with Usopp as they run out of the mansion while Oars enters the courtyard while calling the Straw Hat crew out.
365	29	"Luffy Is the Enemy! The Ultimate Zombie vs. The Straw Hat Crew"; Transliteration: "Teki wa Rufi!! Saikyō Zonbi tai Mugiwara no Ichimi" (Japanese: 敵はルフィ!! 最強ゾンビ対麦わらの一味)	Directed by : Sumio Watanabe; Storyboarded by : Naotoshi Shida	Koga Naoki	August 10, 2008	October 16, 2016
As Absalom makes another attempt to finalize his marriage to Nami, the other Straw Hats are fretting over Oars hunting them all down. Oars assumes he is to kill the Straw Hats and attacks Sanji upon identifying him from his badly drawn wanted poster. While Oars lacks any Devil Fruit power, he is able to use Luffy's attacks to smack Sanji into a building. Oars was about to crush Sanji when Usopp used his Fire Star to set the zombie's head on fire, only to provoke him as Zoro and Franky attempt to fight him. But Oars is too fast and overpowers everyone before destroying bridge where Usopp, Chopper, and Robin were standing. As a wounded Usopp cursed "Luffy" while lying on the ground below alongside his teammates, Oars stood over the seemingly defeated Straw Hats while proclaiming that he is a servant of Moria. Elsewhere, Luffy's continued pursuit of Moria leads him out of the manor and into the forest.
366	30	"You're Going Down, Absalom!! Nami's Lightning Attack of Friendship!!"; Transliteration: "Taorero Abusaromu!! Nami Yūjō no Raigeki!!" (Japanese: 倒れろアブサロム!! ナミ友情の雷撃!!)	Tetsuya Endō	Tsuyoshi Sakurai	August 17, 2008	October 23, 2016
Absalom, still battered from his fight with Sanji, attempts to once again seal his marriage to Nami with a kiss but she regains conscious. Lola arrives at that time, telling Nami to leave while pretending to attack her before Absalom, briefly caught off guard, knocks the zombie out with a furious Nami intent to avenge her friend. Nami manages to win due to a combination of Absalom's injuries and delusion, checking on Lola who saw through her earlier lie while thanking the girl for her encouragement. Meanwhile, as Luffy continues chasing Moria, Perona comes to and decides to leave on the Thousand Sunny after being told of Oars rampaging through the courtyard. But as Oars starts to search the manor for the remaining Straw Hat crew members, the ones he just defeated have all got their second wind.
367	31	"Knock Him Down!! Special Attack: Straw Hat Docking?"; Transliteration: "Ubae Daun!! Hissatsu Mugiwara Dokkingu?" (Japanese: 奪えダウン!! 必殺麦わらドッキング?)	Hiroyuki Satō	Takuya Masumoto	August 24, 2008	November 6, 2016
After being updated by Lola, Nami decides to find her crew after helping herself to Thriller Bark's treasure. But she finds the treasure room after while finding two of Perona's subordinates. Meanwhile, as Brook heads to the kitchen for some salt, the Straw Hats attempt to find a means to knock Oars down. The Straw Hats attempt a "docking" maneuver by hanging onto Franky in order to form a "Giant Robot Warrior", but it fails when Robin refuses to participate in what she considers very embarrassing. The Straw Hats combine their strengths to get Oars off-balance and cause him to fall to the ground, enraging him. Elsewhere, Perona's subordinates load the treasure and food onto the Thousand Sunny when they see the a mysterious bear-like figure who requests for Gecko Moria.
368	32	"The Silent Assault!! The Mysterious Visitor, Tyrant Kuma"; Transliteration: "Ashioto Naki Shūrai!! Nazo no Hōmonsha: Bōkun Kuma" (Japanese: 足音なき襲来!! 謎の訪問者•暴君くま)	Directed by : Hiroshi Matsuzaka; Storyboarded by : Kenji Yokoyama	Yoshiyuki Suga	August 31, 2008	November 13, 2016
Taking advantage of several weaknesses, including his stupidity and similarities to Luffy, the Straw Hats continue to wear away at Oars despite his continued persistence. While the others were intending to hold off Oars until Luffy takes out Gecko Moria, Zoro intends to fight the giant to test his new sword Shuusui. Meanwhile, after Nami gained interrogated intel that Perona is taking the Thousand Sunny, she arrive to confront the girl as the mysterious figure makes his presence known. Perona recognizes the figure as Bartholomew Kuma of the Seven Warlords of the Sea, Kuma requesting for Moria before he is forced to make Perona disappear with his ungloved hand due to her defiance. Displaying his unnatural speed to Nami while asking of Luffy's ties to Ace, Kuma takes his leave while telling her of his "choice to be here". Elsewhere, realizing he caught Doppelman, Luffy finds out that he has been chasing after Moria's shadow the entire time.
369	33	"Oars + Moria! The Most Heinous Combination of Brains and Brawn"; Transliteration: "Ōzu Purasu Moria – Chikara to Zunō no Saikyō Gattai" (Japanese: オーズ+モリア 力と頭脳の最強合体)	Makoto Sonoda	Hirohiko Kamisaka	September 7, 2008	November 20, 2016
Despite Usopp's attempts to reason him about fighting Oars as Luffy is fighting Gecko Moria, Zoro explains that their captain has most likely been tricked by now and that getting his shadow back is first priority and an excuse to test his new sword Shisui. As Zoro finds his 108 Caliber Phoenix has gain a stronger variation from his newly obtained sword, everyone realizes that Oars's tempering with Thriller Bark has moved the ship out of the Florian Triangle and into the clear night sky. Meanwhile, after ditching Luffy in the forest, Moria's shadow returns to its master as he is meeting with Kuma. Kuma proceeds to explain of Blackbeard becoming the newest member of the Warlords while give Moria advice from the World Government to not underestimate the Straw Hats as Crocodile had. Furious at the comment, Moria refuses Kuma's offer to help him as he leaves his deal with the Straw Hats himself. Later entering the cockpit installed in Oars's stomach, Moria's presence confirms Zoro's suspicions while making it hard for them to fight Oars with the remaining thirty minutes of night left. Usopp runs to the kitchen to gather more salt to purify Oars, but Moriya had Oars strike at Usopp while destroying the passage to the kitchen. Luckily, a healed Brook saves Usopp and has brought the Straw Hats a large bag of salt.
370	34	"The Secret Plan to Turn the Tables! Nightmare Luffy Makes His Appearance"; Transliteration: "Gyakuten e no Hisaku – Naitomea Rufi Kenzan" (Japanese: 逆転への秘策 ナイトメア•ルフィ見参)	Tetsuya Endō	Koga Naoki	September 14, 2008	November 27, 2016
With Moria's guidance, Oars is better able to counter the Straw Hats' strategies and turn their attacks against them. Franky is knocked unconscious after a failed attempt to fire himself at Oars with a giant slingshot known as Kuwagata and shoot him at point-blank range with Weapons Left. Nami arrives and joins the battle, but Oars demonstrates that he can somehow stretch his limbs, which the crew realizes is Moria's Devil Fruit powers. Elsewhere, Luffy meets up with the Rolling pirates and their captain Lola the Proposer, whose shadows have been stolen by Moria. Lola has her crew plant all the shadows they captured into him in order to multiply his fighting strength and grant him new skills so that he can defeat Moria. The result is a monstrous version of Luffy, called Nightmare Luffy, that proceeds to reach his crew to take out Moria before the shadows leave his body after ten minutes' time.
371	35	"The Straw Hat Crew Gets Wiped Out! The Shadow-Shadow's Powers in Full Swing"; Transliteration: "Kaimetsu, Mugiwara Ichimi – Kage Kage no Chikara Zenkai" (Japanese: 壊滅, 麦わら一味 カゲカゲの能力全開)	Yukihiko Nakao	Takuya Masumoto	September 21, 2008	December 4, 2016
Moria explains that he is using his ability Shadow Revolution to manipulate Oars's body by distorting the giant's shadow, Oars voicing his intent to fight the Straw Hats personally with Moria deciding to let the giant have his way while supporting him through his Devil Fruit powers. Brook offers to help the Straw Hats fight Oars, talking Usopp into firing him out of Kuwagata with Robin and Nami respectively adding torque and lightning to enable the skeleton to land effective damage on Oars's right shoulder. But the giant quickly retaliates, taking Brook out while destroying the tower he crashed in. Robin attempts to use Devil-Fruit powers on Moria, but he uses his Devil Fruit powers to switch places with his Doppelman so he can steal her shadow from behind. Sanji attempts to attack Moria, only for the villain to switch back into Oars's cockpit. But Chopper, having sneaked onto Oars's shoulder and confirmed the giant's cause of death, reveals that Brook's attack did damage the giant's arm and they need to damage it further. But Oars manages to knock out Chopper and Sanji when they performed a combo attack on the giant, leaving only Nami, Zoro and Usopp standing.
372	36	"The Incredible Battle Starts! Luffy vs Luffy"; Transliteration: "Chōzetsu Batoru Sutāto! Rufi Tai Rufi" (Japanese: 超絶バトルスタート! ルフィVSルフィ)	Directed by : Sumio Watanabe; Storyboarded by : Hiroaki Miyamoto	Yoshiyuki Suga	September 28, 2008	December 11, 2016
With Zoro risking his own life by distracting Oars before the giant knees him into a wall, Usopp shoots Brook's salt into Oars' mouth with Kuwagata. But Moria's shadow catches the bag and flings it back at Usopp, the bag's contents spilling out before Oars apparently stomped Usopp to death. Oars tries to stomp Nami, only for her to be saved Nightmare Luffy who also saved Usopp at the last second before fighting Oars. While the Rolling Pirates take the unconscious Straw Hats to safety, Nightmare Luffy overpowers Oars to the point of knocking out Moria with Gum-Gum Pistol before sending Oars flying with Gum-Gum Storm. The shadows leave Luffy's body, but he appears to have won.
373	37	"The End of the Battle Is Nigh! Pound in the Finishing Move"; Transliteration: "Ketchaku Semaru! Tatakikome, Todome no Ichigeki" (Japanese: 決着迫る! たたき込め, とどめの一撃)	Yutaka Nakashima	Tsuyoshi Sakurai	October 5, 2008	December 18, 2016
Though Oars recovers from Nightmare Luffy's attack, despite their initial reaction to flee, the Rolling Pirates find Luffy joined by his revived crew as they act out a final attack by ear. As Brook takes Luffy to the top of the main mast, Nami uses her Rain Tempo to drench the zombie to be frozen in place by the low-temp air cannon Franky and Usopp built. Zoro and Sanji then proceed to ensnare Oars in a chain and straighten out his spine so a thrown Luffy can use Gum-Gum Giant Bazooka in Third Gear to completely shatter it. With dawn approaching within minutes, the Rolling Pirates deem all is left is wake up Moria and force him to restore their shadows. But a furious Moria emerged from Oars's cockpit, realizing the Rolling Pirates' involvement in Luffy's power boost while ranting that Luffy's crew is not strong enough for what lies in the New World. Musing that Luffy absorbed only hundred shadows to assume his Nightmare state, Moria transforms into a giant monster by using his Shadow's Asgard ability to absorb one thousand shadows stored in the zombies on entire Thriller Bark.
374	38	"Our Bodies Vanish! The Morning Sun Shines On the Nightmarish Island!"; Transliteration: "Karada ga Kieru! Akumu no Shima ni Sasu Asahi!" (Japanese: 肉体が消える! 悪夢の島に射す朝日!)	Naoyuki Itō	Hirohiko Kamisaka	October 12, 2008	January 8, 2017
With Zoro telling the frighten Rolling Pirates that Gecko Moria's Shadows Asgard is nothing but an act of desperation to stall for sunrise at the cost of his mind, Luffy proceeds to attack him in Second Gear. But Luffy only managed to release some of the one thousand shadows with Moria regaining enough of his mind to overwhelm Luffy. But with the Rolling Pirates calling out to their shadows weakening Moria, Luffy acts against his crew's pleas by using both Second and Third Gears to defeat Moria once and for all with a most powerful attack Gum-Gum Giant Jet Shell. Though all of the one thousand shadows are released from Moria, Moria's collapse causes the sunlight to hit Luffy, Zoro, Sanji, Robin, and the Rolling pirates as they are all set ablaze.
375	39	"Not Out of Danger Yet! Orders to Annihilate the Straw Hat Crew"; Transliteration: "Owaranai Kiki! Mugiwara Ichimi Massatsu Shirei" (Japanese: 終わらない危機! 麦わら一味抹殺指令)	Directed by : Kiichi Suzuno; Storyboarded by : Naotoshi Shida	Koga Naoki	October 19, 2008	January 15, 2017
Despite nearly being vaporized, Luffy, Zoro, Sanji, Robin and the Rolling Pirates finally regain all their shadows at the last second along with the rest of Moria's victims. As Hogback informs Absalom of their captain's defeat, the Straw Hats surround the still unconscious Luffy with Usopp worrying that Luffy might hurt himself from facing strongest and feared enemies in the future. As the Rolling Pirates offer to lead Nami to Moria's treasure, she remembers Kuma before seeing him on the collapsed tower. Contacting his superiors via Transponder Snail, Kuma receives orders from the World Government to kill the Straw Hats and everyone else on Thriller Bark to prevent Moria's defeat from becoming public. After taking out some of the Rolling Pirates with a strange move that sends several people flying backwards, Kuma turns his attention to Zoro.
376	40	"It Repels Everything! Kuma’s Paw-Paw Power!"; Transliteration: "Subete o Hajiku Kuma no Nikyu Nikyu no Nōryoku" (Japanese: すべてを弾くくまのニキュニキュの能力)	Directed by : Hiroyuki Satō; Storyboarded by : Tetsuya Endō	Takuya Masumoto	November 9, 2008	January 22, 2017
Zoro attacks Kuma, who reveals that he has eaten the Paw-Paw Fruit, and shows his ability to repel attacks, move considerable distances almost instantly and repel the air to attack his opponents. Zoro is quickly outmatched, and Sanji and Usopp's attempts to help him are rendered futile by Kuma's hard body and ability to block projectiles. Kuma then creates a giant paw print that he compresses, offering all the pirates a chance to survive if they turn over Luffy. But they all unanimously refuse and Kuma detonates his paw print with the explosion from compressed air devastating Thriller Bark.
377	41	"The Pain of My Crewmates Is My Pain! Zoro's Desperate Fight!"; Transliteration: "Nakama no Itami wa Waga Itami – Zoro Kesshi no Tatakai" (Japanese: 仲間の痛みは我が痛みゾロ決死の戦い)	Tetsuya Endō	Takuya Masumoto	November 16, 2008	January 29, 2017
With almost everyone on the island is knocked out in the blast, Kuma was about to grab Luffy when he was attacked by Zoro. But Zoro, reaching his limits, learns Kuma is a cyborg-like being called a Pacifista who was created by the advanced science of the World Government's leading scientist Dr. Vegapunk. Zoro attempts to offer his own life to Kuma to save Luffy, knocking out Sanji when he attempts to take Zoro's place. Impressed by Zoro's resolve, Kuma agrees not to harm Luffy in return for Zoro to subject himself to a paw print holding the extracted pain his captain when through in fighting Moria and Oars. Though warned that it would kill him in the most antagonizing way possible, Zoro accepts the ordeal while requesting to do it far from his crew. Once the deal is complete, Kuma leaves while remarking the loyalty Luffy inspires in his crew, revealing he's aware that Luffy is Dragon's son. As the pirates all come to, with Luffy surprisingly energetic from having his wounds extracted, Sanji finds Zoro as he miraculously survived his near-death experience.
378	42	"The Promise from a Distant Day! The Pirates' Song and a Small Whale!"; Transliteration: "Tōi Hi no Yakusoku – Kaizoku no Uta to Chīsa na Kujira" (Japanese: 遠い日の約束 海賊の唄と小さなクジラ)	Directed by : Makoto Sonoda; Storyboarded by : Junji Shimizu	Yoshiyuki Suga	November 23, 2008	February 5, 2017
Hogback and Absalom escape Thriller Bark with the still unconscious Moria, revealing that Blackbeard's Warlord status from defeating Ace. The next day, the Straw Hats celebrate their victory over Moria, but do not know why Zoro is so badly wounded. Sanji hears the story from the Risky Brothers, but prevents them from telling anyone else, saying it would trouble Luffy greatly to hear that Zoro suffered for his sake, but Robin eavesdrops on the conversation. Luffy tells Brook that Laboon is still alive and he is overjoyed to hear it as Brock begins to think about the time 50 years ago when he and his pirate crew first met Laboon.
379	43	"Brook's Past! A Sad Farewell with His Cheerful Comrade!"; Transliteration: "Burukku no Kako – Yōki na Nakama Kanashiki Wakare" (Japanese: ブルックの過去 陽気な仲間悲しき別れ)	Directed by : Hiroshi Matsuzaka; Storyboarded by : Tetsuya Endō	Isao Murayama	November 30, 2008	February 12, 2017
Brook recalls his past, when the whale Laboon started following his pirate ship and befriended the crew. When the crew headed toward the Grand Line, they had no choice but to leave Laboon behind because the danger the sea would present to a young whale like him, but Laboon followed them over Reverse Mountain, anyway. Brook and his captain convince Laboon to stay behind, promising that after they traveled through the entire Grand Line and he grew strong enough to follow them, they would come back and bring him on their adventures. Three years later, they were unable to fulfill the promise, though.
380	44	"Bink's Booze! The Song that Connects the Past with the Present!"; Transliteration: "Binkusu no Sake – Kako to Ima o Tsunagu Uta" (Japanese: ビンクスの酒 過去と現在をつなぐ唄)	Directed by : Hiroyuki Satō; Storyboarded by : Munehisa Sakai	Tsuyoshi Sakurai	December 7, 2008	February 19, 2017
Brook recalls the Rumbar Pirates' journey through the Grand Line, where they faced many dangers but still managed to enjoy themselves. The captain contracted an illness and attempted to leave the Grand Line through the Calm Belt with the other infected crew, leaving Brook in charge of the remaining pirates. The journey continued until some powerful enemies defeated the Rumbar Pirates in the Florian Triangle, fatally poisoning them. As they were dying, they sang Binks's Brew one last time, recording it in a Tone Dial in the hopes that Brook would revive with his Devil Fruit power and deliver the shell to Laboon. Back in the present, Brook silently hopes Laboon will wait just a little longer for his return.
381	45	"A New Crewmate! The Musician, Humming Brook!"; Transliteration: "Aratana Nakama! Ongakuka – Hanauta no Burukku" (Japanese: 新たな仲間! 音楽家·鼻唄のブルック)	Directed by : Yutaka Nakashima; Storyboarded by : Tetsuya Endō	Koga Naoki	December 14, 2008	February 26, 2017
Brook tells Luffy that he is glad to be alive and asks if he can join the crew, which Luffy approves of. All the Straw Hats are shocked and Nami is horrified by this, except for Zoro, who is sleeping, and Robin, who laughs knowing Luffy would accept him no matter what. They all nevertheless welcome him to the crew. Two days later, Usopp and Franky make a grave for the dead Rumbar Pirates, and Zoro lays the broken Yubashiri at the grave. Nami gets a Vivre Card from Lola, which points the way to Lola's mother, an great pirate in the New World. Luffy takes out the piece of paper he received from Ace in Alabasta, which is also a Vivre Card, and learns that as it is burning and shrinking, Ace's life is in danger. Believing that Ace can get out of danger on his own, Luffy decides to head onward rather than go to rescue him, and the Straw Hats sail away from Thriller Bark. As Luffy and his crew sail away, three enormous and mysterious figures appear in the fog, looking over Thriller Bark.

== Home media release ==
=== Japanese ===
Avex Mode (Japan, Region 2 DVD)
Volume		Episodes	Release date	Ref.
10thシーズン スリラーバーク篇	piece.01	337–339	October 7, 2009	
10thシーズン スリラーバーク篇	piece.02	340–342	November 6, 2009	
10thシーズン スリラーバーク篇	piece.03	343–345	December 2, 2009	
10thシーズン スリラーバーク篇	piece.04	346–348	January 6, 2010	
10thシーズン スリラーバーク篇	piece.05	349–351	February 3, 2010	
10thシーズン スリラーバーク篇	piece.06	352–354	March 3, 2010	
10thシーズン スリラーバーク篇	piece.07	355–357	April 7, 2010	
10thシーズン スリラーバーク篇	piece.08	358–360	May 7, 2010	
10thシーズン スリラーバーク篇	piece.09	361–363	June 2, 2010	
10thシーズン スリラーバーク篇	piece.10	364–366	July 7, 2010	
10thシーズン スリラーバーク篇	piece.11	367–369	August 4, 2010	
10thシーズン スリラーバーク篇	piece.12	370–372	September 1, 2010	
10thシーズン スリラーバーク篇	piece.13	373–375	October 6, 2010	
10thシーズン スリラーバーク篇	piece.14	376–378	November 5, 2010	
10thシーズン スリラーバーク篇	piece.15	379–381	December 12, 2010	
ONE PIECE Log Collection	“THRILLER BARK”	337–349	August 24, 2012	
ONE PIECE Log Collection	“OHZ”	350–363	December 21, 2012	
ONE PIECE Log Collection	“BROOK”	364–381	December 21, 2012	

=== English ===
In North America, the season was recategorized as the majority of "Season Six" for its DVD release by Funimation Entertainment. The Australian Season Six sets were renamed Collection 29 though 32.

Funimation Entertainment (USA, Region 1), Manga Entertainment (UK, Region 2), Madman Entertainment (Australia, Region 4)
Volume		Episodes	Release date			ISBN	Ref.
Volume		Episodes	USA	UK	Australia	ISBN	Ref.
Season Six	Voyage One	337–348	September 30, 2014	N/A	January 7, 2015	ISBN 1-4210-2785-2	
Season Six	Voyage Two	349–360	November 18, 2014	N/A	February 15, 2015	ISBN 1-4210-2952-9	
Season Six	Voyage Three	361–372	January 13, 2015	N/A	May 20, 2015	ISBN 1-4210-2959-6	
Season Six	Voyage Four	373–384	April 7, 2015	N/A	June 10, 2015	ISBN 1-4210-2985-5	
Collections	Collection 14	325–348	November 10, 2015	November 28, 2016	N/A	ISBN N/A	
Collections	Collection 15	349–372	March 22, 2016	January 23, 2017	N/A	ISBN N/A	
Collections	Collection 16	373–396	June 28, 2016	March 27, 2016	N/A	ISBN N/A	
Treasure Chest Collection 4		300–396	N/A		December 7, 2016	ISBN N/A	
Voyage Collection	Seven	300–348	N/A		February 21, 2018	ISBN N/A	
Voyage Collection	Eight	349–396	N/A		March 7, 2018	ISBN N/A	
