= One Piece season 9 =

One Piece
- Season 9 Enies Lobby
- The cover of the first DVD compilation released by Avex Mode of the ninth season.
- No. of episodes: 73

Release
- Original network: Fuji Television
- Original release: May 21, 2006 – December 23, 2007

Season chronology
- ← Previous; Season 8 Next → Season 10

The ninth season of the One Piece anime series was directed by Kōnosuke Uda and produced by Toei Animation. Like the rest of the series, it follows the adventures of Monkey D. Luffy and his Straw Hat Pirates from Eiichirō Oda's One Piece manga series. The majority of the season covers the "Enies Lobby" (エニエス·ロビー, Eniesu Robī) story arc, which adapts Oda's manga from the end of the 39th through the 45th volumes. Between Enies Lobby episodes there is the five episode arc "Straw Hat Theater & Straw Pirate Tales" (Note: While "mugiwara" (麦わら) is usually translated as "Straw Hat" in the English adaptations of One Piece, its literal meaning is only "straw".) (麦わら劇場&麦わら海賊譚, Mugiwara Gekijō & Mugiwara Kaizoku Dan), with the flashback scenes being shown in 4:3 fullscreen format and are pillarboxed within the 16:9 widescreen format, and three episodes covering the "Historical Drama Boss Luffy" (時代劇 ｢ルフィ親分捕物帖｣). "Ice Hunter" deals with the Straw Hats taking on the Atchino Family to retrieve their flag. The final episode is a stand-alone storyline featuring Chopperman.

Having crossed the yearly occurring storm called Aqua Laguna (アクア·ラグナ, Akua Raguna) on the prototype sea train Rocketman (ロケットマン), piloted by sea train conductor Kokoro (ココロ), the Straw Hats, including Usopp, disguised as his alternate ego, the sharpshooting superhero Sniperking, and their allies, the Franky Family (フランキー一家, Furankī Ikka), the Galley-La Company (ガレーラカンパニー, Garēra Kanpanī) foremen, and the sumo-wrestling frog Yokozuna (ヨコズナ), assault the government's stronghold island Enies Lobby to reclaim their comrades Franky and Nico Robin from the secret assassination group Cipher Pol No. 9 (CP9). Afterwards, they avoid annihilation by the dreaded military operation Buster Call (バスターコール, Basutā Kōru). And once back on the city island Water 7 (ウォーターセブン, Wotā Sebun), the Straw Hats add Franky to their crew and acquire a new ship, the Thousand Sunny (サウザンドサニ, Sauzando Sanī). Lastly, they encounter a group of bounty hunters, called the Atchino Family.

Each episode of "Straw Hat Theatre & Straw Pirate Tales" features a 21-minute recap of the Straw Hats' backstories and 3-minute omake adaptation of a short comic by Oda which was originally published in the One Piece Log fan magazine. The "Historical Drama Boss Luffy" episodes are sequels to the fourth One Piece television special which take place in Grand Jipang.

The season initially ran from May 21, 2006, through December 23, 2007, on Fuji Television. Since then, nineteen DVD compilations, each containing three episodes of the "Enies Lobby" arc, were released by Avex Mode between January 9, 2008, and July 1, 2009. A 20th DVD, containing two episodes, was released on August 5, 2009. A 21st DVD, containing four episodes, was released on September 2, 2009. The special arc was released on a single DVD on May 23, 2008. In July 2012, Funimation announced they had acquired this season as part of their own US "Season Five".

The season uses six pieces of theme music: four opening themes and two ending themes. The opening theme for the first part of the "Enies Lobby" arc is "Brand New World" by D-51 for the first fifteen episodes; the special arc of five episodes open with "We Are! (7 Straw Hat Pirates Ver.)" (ウィーアー!〜7人の麦わら海賊団篇〜, Wī Ā! Shichinin no Mugiwara Kaizokudan Hen), sung by the Japanese voice actors of the first seven Straw Hat Pirates; the second part of the "Enies Lobby" arc uses "Crazy Rainbow" by Tackey & Tsubasa, up to episode 325, and "Jungle P" by 5050, until the end of the season. The two ending themes are "Adventure World" by Delicatessen, used in the first 15 episodes of the "Enies Lobby" arc, and the special ending theme, "Family", also sung by the Straw Hats' voice actors, which was used to end the episodes of the special arc. All episodes of the second part of the "Enies Lobby" arc and after have since aired without an ending theme until season 20.

== Episodes ==
No. overall (Note: Episode number by Toei Animation's count)	No. in season	Title (Note: Title of the episode: literally translated, romanized using Hepburn romanization, and in kanji form)	Directed by	Written by	Original release date (Note: Date the episode originally aired on Fuji Television)	English air date (Note: Episodes were initially released in English on DVD, but to correspond with the Japanese column, the air dates refer to their first English television airings on Adult Swim's Toonami programming block. For information on DVD releases, please refer to the "Home Releases" section of this page.)
Enies Lobby
264	1	"Landing Operations Start! Charge in, Straw Hats!"; Transliteration: "Jōriku Sakusen Shidō! Mugiwara Ichimi Totsunyū seyo!" (Japanese: 上陸作戦始動! 麦わら一味突入せよ!)	Munehisa Sakai	Hirohiko Kamisaka	May 21, 2006	July 27, 2014
As the Straw Hats and their allies are about to reach Enies Lobby, Paulie sketches the island's terrain and explains that, to save Robin, the crew must reach her before she passes through the Gates of Justice (正義の門, Seigi no Mon). Since the Straw Hats are the only ones with any chance of matching the CP9 in combat, the Franky Family and the Galley-La foremen intend to be the first wave so the pirates can rush in on Rocketman. As Enies Lobby draws near, the gigantic Gates of Justice appears in the sky behind it. While his crewmates and allies gaze in awe, Luffy ignores the plan and strides past the first of the gates. On the other side of the island, in the Tower of Law (司法の塔, Shihō no Tō), Chief Spandam and other CP9 agent await the arrival of Rob Lucci's group and their prisoners.
265	2	"Luffy Cuts Through! Big Showdown on the Judicial Island!"; Transliteration: "Rufi Kai Shingeki! Shihō no Shima de Dai Kessen!" (Japanese: ルフィ快進撃! 司法の島で大決戦!!)	Hiroyuki Kakudō	Hirohiko Kamisaka	June 4, 2006	August 3, 2014
Luffy easily gets past the second gate, while the Franky Family and the Galley-La foremen, following their initial plan, break the first gate's defenses. All goes smoothly at first, but by the time the Franky Family's main force reaches the second gate, the marines have the giants Oimo (オイモ) and Kashi (カーシー, Kāshī) to take up their posts. Overmatched in strength and size, the Franky Family send their largest fighters, the Kairiki Destroyers (怪力デストロイヤーズ, Kairiki Desutoroiyāzu). However, even these overly large humans can do little against the giants' power and are quickly defeated. On the other side of the gate, Luffy faces the collective might of Enies Lobby's 10,000 men.
266	3	"Battle Against Giants! Open the Second Gate!"; Transliteration: "Kyojinzoku to no Kōbō! Dai Ni no Mon o Akero!" (Japanese: 巨人族との攻防! 第2の門を開けろ!)	Yoko Ikeda	Hirohiko Kamisaka	June 11, 2006	August 10, 2014
The Galley-La foremen and the leading members of the Franky Family arrive late at the second gate because they had to mount the Franky Family's king bulls (キングブル), sea dwelling animals that look like sea horses, on caterpillar tracks. Combining forces, they manage to pin down Kashi against a wall. Then, taunting Oimo, they goad him into accidentally knocking Kashi out. In the Tower of Law, Spandam receives an incomplete report about the number of people that Luffy took out, believing the enemy captain is not a threat. Lucci's party arrives and the CP9 celebrate their reunion with petty bickering and a contest of strength. Meanwhile, Luffy, defying resistance, makes his way towards the Courthouse Plaza.
267	4	"Find a Way Out! Rocketman Takes Flight!"; Transliteration: "Katsuro o Hirake! Sora o Tobu Rokettoman!" (Japanese: 活路を開け! 空を飛ぶロケットマン!)	Yoshihiro Ueda	Hirohiko Kamisaka	June 18, 2006	August 17, 2014
Robin and Franky are brought before Spandam, while Luffy blasts through waves of marines. The Galley-La foremen and the Franky Family eventually slip by Oimo and open the second gate. However, their joy is short-lived, as a group of marines closes the first gate behind them. To overcome the unanticipated obstacle, Zoro changes the plan. Yokozuna bends the island's outside fence downward. Using it as a ramp, the sea train jumps over both of the gates and crash lands into Oimo's back, finishing him off, and concluding everyone's arrival at the main island. As the marines' elite Law's Watch Dog Unit enters the now escalating fight.
268	5	"Catch Up with Luffy! The Straw Hats' All-Out Battle"; Transliteration: "Rufi ni Oitsuke! Mugiwara Ichimi Sōryokusen" (Japanese: ルフィに追いつけ! 麦わら一味総力戦)	Directed by : Hiroaki Miyamoto; Storyboarded by : Eisaku Inoue	Hirohiko Kamisaka	June 25, 2006 (Note: Episodes 268 and 269 aired together as a television special.)	August 24, 2014
The Straw Hats struggle to catch up with Luffy, but get caught up in impeding each other's efforts; Sanji and Zoro indulge themselves in petty bickering and Nami injures her crewmates by testing her newly improved weapon. The streets appear empty, abandoned by the men who were fighting Luffy. Just then, the Law's Watch Dog Unit and a large group of other men step into their way. A fight seems inevitable until their allies, riding the king bulls, arrive. Paulie uses his ropes to pull the crew onto the back of one of the large animals. Then the Galley-La foremen replace Straw Hats' in battle to allow the rest of the group to escape.
269	6	"Robin Betrayed! The Motive of the World Government!"; Transliteration: "Uragira re ta Robin! Sekai Seifu no Omowaku!" (Japanese: 裏切られたロビン! 世界政府の思惑!)	Katsumi Tokoro	Hirohiko Kamisaka	June 25, 2006	September 7, 2014
Spandam tells Robin that her crew has come to save her and that he, despite the agreement between her and the CP9, plans on taking them prisoner. On the main road, the Straw Hats and the Franky Family proceed towards the Courthouse Plaza. Chopper talks with the king bull Sodom, who notes that Usopp did not make it onto his back. Meanwhile, frustrated with his inability to move forward, Luffy slingshots himself onto the courthouse roof. There, Blueno is awaiting his arrival.
270	7	"Give Robin Back! Luffy vs. Blueno!"; Transliteration: "Robin o Kaese! Rufi vs. Burūno!" (Japanese: ロビンを返せ! ルフィvsブルーノ!)	Takahiro Imamura	Hirohiko Kamisaka	July 2, 2006	September 14, 2014
Oimo explains to Usopp about how he and Kashi came to support the marines. The marines told them that they arrested their bosses: the giants Dorry and Broggy that the Straw Hats met shortly after entering the Grand Line. Sodom the king bull incurs severe damage and urges the Straw Hats riding him to continue without him. Quickly, they board Sodom's brother Gomorrah and continue on. Atop the courthouse roof, the fight between Blueno and Luffy begins with the latter's first punch appearing to have a greater effect compared to their previous encounter.
271	8	"Don't Stop! Hoist the Counterattack Signal!"; Transliteration: "Tachidomaru na! Hangeki no Noroshi o Agero!" (Japanese: 立ち止まるな! 反撃の狼煙を上げろ!)	Yoshihiro Ueda	Hirohiko Kamisaka	July 9, 2006	September 21, 2014
Kokoro and her granddaughter Chimney contact the Straw Hats by means of Nami's portable transponder snail phone. They inform them of Luffy's location and instruct them on how to lower the courthouse's drawbridge. The Franky Family decides to lower it. Just then, the second of Enies Lobby's elite units enters the battle. One of the Guilty Jurymen throws his massive iron ball at Gomorrah, knocking him down. Luckily, Usopp turns the tides with Omoi and Kashi after revealing the truth of Dorry and Broggy having never been imprisoned. Gomorrah, arising again despite severe injury, tells those riding him to hold on as he plans to take them to their destination. Inside the Tower of Law, Kaku and Kalifa hesitatingly eat the Devil Fruits that Spandam has given them.
272	9	"Almost to Luffy! Gather at the Courthouse Plaza!"; Transliteration: "Rufi Mokuzen! Saibanshomae Hiroba e Shūketsu se yo" (Japanese: ルフィ目前! 裁判所前広場へ集結せよ)	Hiroyuki Kakudō	Hirohiko Kamisaka	July 23, 2006	September 28, 2014
Although Gomorrah was blinded, he continues on. Sanji and Zoro crush a building in the king bull's path and the party arrives at the courthouse. On the other side of the drawbridge, Spandam is brought a transponder snail phone with an urgent report. Confident that he will only be told of the Straw Hats' capture, he allows Robin and Franky to listen in, letting them know of their rescuers' success. In front of the courthouse, Zoro cuts open the building's immense stone door. The Franky Family split into three groups, two of which storm the drawbridge towers to reach the levelers at their tops. On the courthouse's roof, Luffy and Blueno fight on even terms until Luffy activates his newest technique, the Second Gear.
273	10	"Everything is to Protect My Friends! Second Gear Activated!"; Transliteration: "Subete wa Nakama o Mamoru Tame ni! Gia Sekando Hatsudō" (Japanese: 全ては仲間を守る為に! ギア2発動!)	Munehisa Sakai	Hirohiko Kamisaka	July 30, 2006	October 5, 2014
The Straw Hats storm the courthouse, where the remaining members of the Franky Family fight the three-headed judge Baskerville, and, aided by Yokozuna, block the building's entrance to cut off reinforcements. Above them, Luffy's Second Gear is put into action against Blueno, while his crew fight their way upstairs. On the main road, the giants have defeated the Law's Watch Dog Unit, and with Usopp and the Galley-La foremen are heading for the plaza. Luffy defeats Blueno, steps past his unconscious body, and cries out for Robin to hear that he has arrived.
274	11	"Give us Your Answer, Robin! The Straw Hats' Outcry!"; Transliteration: "Kotaero Robin! Mugiwara Ichimi no Sakebi!!" (Japanese: 答えろロビン! 麦わら一味の叫び!!)	Yoko Ikeda	Hirohiko Kamisaka	August 6, 2006	October 12, 2014
Franky cannot understand why Robin refuses to be saved after Spandam broke his promise. While Luffy yells in the background, Franky decides to make Robin face him. He uses his remaining cola to inflate his buttocks and with a giant fart, launches himself and Robin outside, onto the balcony, and into Luffy's sight, breaking his chains in the process. Luffy wants to slingshot himself over the waterfall to rescue Robin, but she tells him to stay where he is and that only she wants to die. In front of the courthouse, Yokozuna succumbs to the jurymen's attacks. The marines are about to pour in as the giants arrive and assume control of the position. Kashi throws Usopp up onto the courthouse roof where he joins the assembling Straw Hats. Gathering on the battlements, they face Robin and the CP9, while they wait for the drawbridge to be lowered.
275	12	"Robin's Past! The Girl Who was Called a Devil!"; Transliteration: "Robin no Kako! Akuma to Yoba re ta Shōjo!" (Japanese: ロビンの過去! 悪魔と呼ばれた少女!)	Hiroaki Miyamoto	Hirohiko Kamisaka	August 13, 2006	October 19, 2014
Twenty years into the past, Robin is growing up on the island of Ohara. Her aunt, with whom she lives while her mother is away doing research, treats her poorly. Other children ostracize her. Studying in the world's greatest library, the Tree of Omniscience, in the hopes of being allowed to help the local archeologists in their forbidden research, Robin earns the rank of a scholar in archaeology at age eight. However, when she announces her intention to help, her request is denied because of her youth. Disappointed at being rejected again, she walks along the shore, where she stumbles on Jaguar D. Saul, a giant and deserted vice-admiral of the navy. The two become friends and Saul teaches her to laugh.
276	13	"Fated Mother and Daughter! The Mother's Name is Olvia!"; Transliteration: "Shukumei no Oyako! Sono Haha no Na wa Orubia!" (Japanese: 宿命の母娘! その母の名はオルビア!)	Directed by : Toru Yamada; Storyboarded by : Eisaku Inoue	Hirohiko Kamisaka	September 10, 2006	October 26, 2014
Saul is shocked to learn that Robin is Nico Olvia's daughter and that he has been washed up on the shores of Ohara. Olvia, who returned to the island on a stolen navy ship, hurries to the Tree of Omniscience to warn her colleagues of a coming navy fleet. However, she is too late. The government ship that carried Spandam's father Spandaine and his men had already arrived. They frighten the island's population into boarding an evacuation ship, while the government soldiers arrest the scholars and search the library. Professor Clover, Robin's mentor, urges Robin to board the evacuation ship, but she refuses. As it becomes clear that the scholars will not be forgiven for their forbidden research, Clover asks to be allowed to speak to the heads of the government, known as the Five Elder Stars.
277	14	"The Tragedy of Ohara! The Terror of the Buster Call!"; Transliteration: "Ohara no Higeki! Basutā Kōru no Kyōfu" (Japanese: オハラの悲劇! バスターコールの恐怖)	Takahiro Imamura	Hirohiko Kamisaka	September 24, 2006 (Note: Episodes 277 and 278 aired as part of a television special alongside episodes of Sazae-san and Kochikame.)	November 2, 2014
Professor Clover is allowed to speak with one of the Elder Stars and reports of their research. He describes a civilization that existed hundreds of years ago and vanished at the time that the world government assumed power. He considers the collective evidence, which leads him to believe that the government tried to erase their former enemies from history. After stating that Ohara has learned too much, the Elder Star orders Spandaine to kill the professor and to give the order to destroy the island. Suddenly, the library is set aflame; while the scholars try to save the books, Robin admits to being an archeologist and unites with her mother. However, their reunion does not last long. Around them, cannon shots from the Buster Call's battleships start to hail down and Olvia sends her daughter off with Saul to flee the island, while she joins the effort to save the library's knowledge.
278	15	"Say You Want to Live! We Are Your Friends!!"; Transliteration: "Ikitai to Ie! Oretachi wa Nakama da!!" (Japanese: 生きたいと言え! オレ達は仲間だ!!)	Yoshihiro Ueda	Hirohiko Kamisaka	September 24, 2006	November 9, 2014
Saul fights the battleships, attempting to allow Robin to escape. She tries to board the evacuation ship, but per Spandaine's orders and the village's disdain for her, she is denied access. Vize-Admiral Kuzan, later known as Admiral Aokiji, enters the scene to engage in battle with Saul. While they fight, the evacuation ship is sunk by the fanatical Vice-Admiral Sakazuki, later known as Admiral Akainu. Saul, on the verge of dying, instructs Robin to flee on his raft. Persuaded by Saul's argument and Sakazuki's action, Kuzan helps Robin escape. From then on, Robin lives a life on the run, not being able to trust even the kindest of people, in a world that believes that her existence alone is a sin. In the present, Robin admits her greatest fear: to be seen as a burden by her crewmates and cast away, because being with her means having the world as their enemy. Finally knowing what kept her away, Sniper King, on Luffy's order, burns the government's flag, declaring war against the World Government itself.
Straw Hat Theater & The Straw Hat Pirate Crew
279	16	"Jump Towards the Falls! Luffy's Feelings!"; Transliteration: "Taki ni Mukatte Tobe! Rufi no Omoi!!" (Japanese: 滝に向かって飛べ! ルフィの想い!!)	Munehisa Sakai	N/A	October 1, 2006	November 16, 2014
Luffy's backstory is shown.
EX–1	EX–1	"Straw Hat Theatre #1: Chopper Man"; Transliteration: "Mugiwara Gekijō Sono Ichi: Chopper Man" (Japanese: 麦わら劇場その1「Chopper Man」)	N/A	N/A	October 1, 2006 (Note: Though listed separately on the DVD release, the omake shorts aired as part of the episodes preceding them in the table, filling the last three minutes of the series' timeslot.)	November 16, 2014
The "ally of justice" (正義の味方, seigi no mikata) Chopper Man (チョッパーマン, Choppā Man) and his "lovely assistant" (可憐なる助手, karen naru joshu) Namifia (ナミフィア) battle against the "incarnation of evil" (悪の権化, aku no gonge) Dr. Usodabada (ウソダバダ), his henchmen "onigiri mystery-man" (おにぎり怪人, onigiri kaijin) Zorokiller (ゾロキラー, Zorokillā), "flower mystery-woman" (お花怪人, ohana kaijin) Robiflowan (ロビフラワン, Robifurawan), and the "perverted monster" (エロかいじゅう, ero kaijū) Sanjilops (サンジロプス, Sanjiropusu), as well as against his "secret weapon" (秘密兵器, himitsu heiki), the "giant robot" (巨大ロボ, kyodai robo) Giant Luffy Bomber (ジャイアント·ルフィボンバー, Jaianto Rufibonbā).
280	17	"The Ways of Men! Zoro's Techniques, Usopp's Dream!"; Transliteration: "Otoko no Ikisama! Zoro no Waza Usoppu no Yume" (Japanese: 男の生き様! ゾロの業·ウソップの夢)	Munehisa Sakai & Yoko Ikeda	N/A	October 8, 2006	November 23, 2014
Zoro and Usopp's backstories are summarized.
EX–2	EX–2	"Straw Hat Theatre #2: Report Time"; Transliteration: "Mugiwara Gekijō Sono Ni: Report Time" (Japanese: 麦わら劇場その2「Report Time」)	N/A	N/A	October 8, 2006	November 23, 2014
A reporter visits the Straw Hat crew to interview them about the food on the ship before Sanji joined.
281	18	"A Bond of Friendship Woven by Tears! Nami's World Map!"; Transliteration: "Namida ga Tsumui da Nakama no Kizuna! Nami no Sekai Chizu" (Japanese: 涙が紡いだ仲間の絆! ナミの世界地図)	Munehisa Sakai & Yoko Ikeda	N/A	October 15, 2006	November 30, 2014
Nami's backstory is summarized.
EX–3	EX–3	"Straw Hat Theatre #3: Obahan Time"; Transliteration: "Mugiwara Gekijō Sono San: Obahan Time" (Japanese: 麦わら劇場その3「Obahan Time」)	N/A	N/A	October 15, 2006	November 30, 2014
A simple question is answered: if the Straw Hat Pirates were all middle-aged women, who would be the strongest?
282	19	"Parting Builds a Man's Character! Sanji and Chopper!"; Transliteration: "Wakare ga Otoko o Migaku! Sanji to Choppā" (Japanese: 別れが男を磨く! サンジとチョッパー)	Munehisa Sakai & Yoko Ikeda	N/A	October 22, 2006	January 4, 2015
The backstories of Sanji and Chopper are summarized.
EX–4	EX–4	"Straw Hat Theatre #4: No Respect Time"; Transliteration: "Mugiwara Gekijō Sono Yon: Jingi Nai Time" (Japanese: 麦わら劇場その4「仁義ないTime」)	N/A	N/A	October 22, 2006	January 4, 2015
The three mafia leaders, Don Luffione (ドン·ルフィオーネ, Don Rufiōne), Don Zorocia (ドン·ゾロシア), and Don Sanjino (ドン·サンジーノ) meet. After an argument, Don Zoroscia declares war. The mafia heads dispatch the assassins Usotoūya (ウソトウーヤ), Choparīni (チョパリーニ), Namimore (ナミモーレ), and Robita (ロビータ) to kill their peers.
283	20	"Everything is for Her Friends! Robin in the Darkness!"; Transliteration: "Subete wa Nakama no Tame ni! Yami no Naka no Robin!" (Japanese: 全ては仲間の為に! 闇の中のロビン!)	Munehisa Sakai & Yoko Ikeda	N/A	October 29, 2006	January 11, 2015
The reasons for Nico Robin's recent actions as well as her backstory are summarized.
EX–5	EX–5	"Straw Hat Theatre #5: Monster Time"; Transliteration: "Mugiwara Gekijō Sono Go Monster Time" (Japanese: 麦わら劇場その5「Monster Time」)	N/A	N/A	October 29, 2006	January 11, 2015
In the town of Monsuton (モンストン), the gorgon Rojūsa (ロジューサ) has lost her favorite earrings. To cheer her up, her friends, the dragon Lugyao (ルギヤオ), the centaur Usoppaka (ウソッパカ), the kraken Chopāken (チョパーケン), the mermaid Sutoronamī (ストロナミー), the kappa Sanzarā (サンザラー), and the minotaur Zoromiruku (ゾロミルク), try to find her something better.
Enies Lobby
284	21	"I'm Not Gonna Hand Over the Blueprints! Franky's Decision!"; Transliteration: "Sekkeizu wa Watasanai! Furankī no Ketsudan" (Japanese: 設計図は渡さない! フランキーの決断)	Hiroyuki Kakudō	Hirohiko Kamisaka	November 5, 2006	January 18, 2015
Though initially intimidated when the Straw Hat Pirates declare war on the World Government, Spandam regains his composure when the bridge leading to the Tower of Law is disabled midway. CP9 are then about to take their leave for the Gates of Justice when Franky reveals the Pluton blueprints that he hid in his body. Franky proceeds to explain that he and the previous shipwrights only kept the blueprints in case a counter is needed against another ancient weapon revived by the World Government through Robin. But seeing Robin not to be the monster the rumors made her out to be, Franky decides to gamble the fate of the world on the Straw Hats' resolve to save their friend and burns the blueprints. But then emotionally touched to find his gang are also on Enies Lobby to save him, a distracted Franky finds himself shoved off the balcony by a furious Spandam. At that time, after contacting the Straw Hats via transponder snail phone to jump aboard, Kokoro runs Rocketman up the half-lowered drawbridge. The sea train hits Franky while jumping through the waterfall and on a crash course into the Tower of Law.
285	22	"Obtain the 5 Keys! The Straw Hat Pirates vs. CP9!"; Transliteration: "Itsutsu no Kage o Ubae! Mugiwara Ichimi Tai CP9" (Japanese: 5つの鍵を奪え! 麦わら一味対CP9)	Takahiro Imamura	Koga Naoki	November 12, 2006	January 25, 2015
After emerging from the rubble caused by Rocket Man crashing into the Tower of Law, the Straw Hats and Franky are greeted by the blabbermouth CP9 agent Fukurou as he reveals that Spandam has given CP9 orders to execute the intruders. Also explaining that Spandam and Lucci are taking Robin to the Gates of Justice, Fukurou adds that he and four other CP9 members each possess a key that may unlock the sea stone handcuffs on Robin. As Luffy chases after Robin, the Straw Hats and Franky pursue the keys and each encounter a CP9 member. At the same time, Chimney and her pet rabbit Gonbe accidentally find a secret passage and end up following Spandam and Lucci as they take Robin to the Gates of Justice.
286	23	"Devil Fruit Powers! Kaku and Jabra Transform!"; Transliteration: "Akuma no Mi no Chikara! Kaku to Jabura Daihenshin" (Japanese: 悪魔の実の力! カクとジャブラ大変身)	Yoshihiro Ueda	Hirohiko Kamisaka	November 19, 2006	February 1, 2015
As Luffy decides to make his way to the Gates of Justice to catch up to Robin and her captors, Nami and Sanji have their respective encounters with Kumadori and Kalifa while Franky runs into Fukurou. While Zoro engages Kaku in an intense sword fight, Usopp's attempt to steal a key from the sleeping CP9 agent Jabra humorously fails as the assassin wakes up and reveals himself to have the power of the Dog Dog Fruit Model: Wolf. At the same time, Kaku reveals to Zoro his newly gained Devil Fruit power: the Ox-Ox Fruit Model: Giraffe. But after causing himself and Zoro to fall to the floor where Usopp and Jabra are, Kaku finds himself being ridiculed for his appearance by Jabra. After Usopp accidentally fires a one half of a pair of sea-stone handcuffs onto Zoro, he ends up provoking Kaku into using a Tempest Kick in his man beast form to vertically cut the building in half. Smoke and debris fill the room as half of the building starts to fall.
287	24	"I Won't Kick Even If It Costs Me My Life! Sanji's Chivalry!"; Transliteration: "Shin demo Keran! Sanji Otoko no Kishidō" (Japanese: 死んでも蹴らん! サンジ男の騎士道!)	Hiroaki Miyamoto	Yoshiyuki Suga	November 26, 2006	February 8, 2015
As the smoke clears from Kaku's man beast enhanced Tempest Kick, Zoro and Usopp find they have been handcuffed together. Zoro and Usopp learn that each of the keys are numbered, but as neither Kaku nor Jabura have the key needed to free their prey from their seastone handcuffs, the two CP9 members are forced to resume the fight. Chopper arrives and is then sent off to obtain the Number 2 key from one of the other assassins. Chopper comes across Nami as she attempted to flee Kumadori after stealing the Number 3 key, knocking the CP9 operative out. Soon after, Nami and Chopper find a round and glossy Sanji hitting the ground from a few floors up. After Nami realizes his opponent was Kalifa, Sanji admits to have done his best in trying to get her key but could not bring himself to harm a woman. Despite scolding him for being too easy, Nami decides to take over and fight Kalifa while leaving Sanji in Chopper's care.
288	25	"Fukurou's Miscalculation! My Cola is the Water of Life!"; Transliteration: "Fukurō no Gosan! Ore no Kōra wa Inochi no Mizu" (Japanese: フクロウの誤算! 俺のコーラは命の水)	Yoko Ikeda	Koga Naoki	December 3, 2006	February 15, 2015
As Nami reaches Kalifa while Chopper holds Kumadori at bay, Luffy is saved from drowning by Chimney and Gonbe as they show him to the underground passage leading to the Gates of Justice. Not having access to the key, Luffy activates a most newest technique, the Third Gear, to break through the gate leading to the passage. Meanwhile, low on reserves as he is down to the last drop of cola, Franky gets into a fist fight with Fukuro as their scuffle takes them to the kitchen. At the same time, with his Rumble Ball boost already run out, Chopper is knocked into the room by Kumadori whom he manages to lock in the giant fridge to Franky's annoyance. After a momentary spat between them before watching the cyborg get pummeled by Fukuro, followed a few misfires with other beverages, Chopper manages to give Franky the three cola bottles he needs to turn the tide as the cyborg knocks Fukuro out of the tower.
289	26	"Zoro Busts Out a New Technique! The Sword's Name is Sniperking?"; Transliteration: "Zoro Shinwaza Sakuretsu! Katana no Na wa Sogekingu?" (Japanese: ゾロ新技炸裂! 刀の名はそげキング?)	Hiroyuki Kakudō	Yoshiyuki Suga	December 10, 2006	February 22, 2015
Refreshed after having placed three full bottles of cola in his stomach compartment, Franky turns the tide in his battle with Fukurou as they take their battle outside and in the sea current with Chopper watching before seeing a bloated Kumadori emerge from the fridge. With Fukuro attempting to keep him from escaping the current leading to the waterfall surrounding Enies Lobby's main island, Franky barely saves himself by grabbing Fukurou's leg and forces him to moon walk back up to the ground to resume their fight. A furious Fukuro instead attempts to kill Franky by crushing him against the Tower of Law, only for Franky to hold onto his opponent with his dividable legs and stop the momentum with his air pressure cannon before using the latter to propel his opponent to the ground. Back inside the Tower of Law, after Usopp attempts to have Kaku and Jabra fight each other, Zoro reveals his own plan by holding onto Usopp while he clings onto one of his swords.
290	27	"Uncontrollable! Chopper's Forbidden Rumble!"; Transliteration: "Seigyo Funō! Choppā Kindan no Ranburu!" (Japanese: 制御不能! チョッパー禁断のランブル)	Yoshihiro Ueda	Koga Naoki	December 17, 2006	March 1, 2015
As Zoro's strategy to use Usopp as a weapon falls apart, Chopper's breather ends as an overweight Kumadori frees himself from the fridge after eating everything inside. Kumadori uses his Life Return ability to digest the eaten food and regain his usual figure, explaining the ability to a fascinated Chopper before they resume their fight. Chopper quickly realizes that he cannot break through Kumadori's body-hardening technique without the effect of his Rumble Ball drug. Regardless of the risk as he already used one to save Nami and should not take another for six hours, Chopper uses a second Rumble Ball. Despite the erratic transformations, Chopper manages to enter Armed Point to land a hit on Kumadori. However, the attack only infuriates Kumadori as he beats the now weakened Chopper to submission before preparing for the deathblow. Chopper, remembering Kureha warning him not to take the risk again after learning of the devastation he caused the first time he did it, is left with no recourse but to use a third Rumble Ball with the thought to protect his friends. As a consequence, Chopper transforms into an oversized and purely instinct-driven version of himself that Kureha had best described as a monster.
Boss Luffy Historical Special
291	28	"Boss Luffy Returns! Is It a Dream or Reality? Lottery Ruckus!"; Transliteration: "Rufi Oyabun Futatabi! Yume ga Aware ka Tomikuji Zōdō" (Japanese: ルフィ親分再び! 夢か現か富くじ騒動)	Munehisa Sakai	Yoshiyuki Suga	December 24, 2006	March 8, 2015
In the Edo period-based alternate reality Grand Jipang, the small girl Rika takes an ill person, whom everyone calls Tot-san (which means "father" in Japanese), to her house to nurse him back to health. Organized crime boss Buggy the Clown and one of the town's highest officials scheme to get rid of Detective Luffy. Mistaking Rika to be the daughter of Tot-san, Buggy kidnaps her to collect Tot-san's debt. When Luffy comes to rescue her, the high official attempts to exile him for attacking an innocent citizen. Instead, he himself is stripped of his position for joining forces with criminals by the shogun's daughter Vivi.
292	29	"A Big Rice Cake Tossing Race at the Castle! Red Nose's Plot!"; Transliteration: "Oshiro de Mochi Maki Dai Rēsu! Akai Hana no Inbō" (Japanese: お城で餅まき大レース! 赤い鼻の陰謀)	Yoko Ikeda	Koga Naoki	January 7, 2007	March 15, 2015
It is the seventh day of the new year in Grand Jipang. Nami, Sanji, and Chopper are on their way to the shogun's castle, delivering a large quantity of rice cakes to be thrown from the castle. Most of the townspeople have gathered there, hoping to catch the one cake containing a precious jewel. Buggy and his henchmen have made several plans to seize the cakes, including the one with the jewel, before they reach their destination. Although his plans fail, Buggy manages to take Princess Vivi hostage. However, Detective Luffy shows up in time to thwart his efforts. In the end, the cakes are safe and everyone eats until they are satisfied.
Enies Lobby
293	30	"Bubble Master Kalifa! The Soap Trap Closes in on Nami!"; Transliteration: "Awatsukai Karifa! Nami ni Hakaru Sekken no Wana" (Japanese: 泡使いカリファ! ナミに迫る石鹸の罠)	Hiroaki Miyamoto	Yoshiyuki Suga	January 14, 2007	March 22, 2015
Having taken three Rumble Balls, Chopper transforms into his berserk Monster Point form and easily defeats Kumadori despite his attempts to subdue the instinct-driven beast. Seeing the unconscious Kumadori being thrown towards Courthouse Plaza after getting Fukuro's number four key, deducing Kalifa has the key needed to free Zoro and Usopp, Franky finds himself being knocked off the tower by Chopper. Chopper then begins to climb up the outer wall. Meanwhile, after being momentarily weakened while Kalifa has a bath before she gets herself dressed, Nami realizes the essence of Kalifa's Devil Fruit power to be soap-related. Kalifa explains her ingestion of the Bubble-Bubble Fruit allowed her to produce foam from her body that "cleans" her opponent's body of any strength, using her touch to make Nami's legs glossy and smooth to render her unable to walk. At the same time, covering for Spandam so he can get Robin to the Gates of Justice, Lucci waits for Luffy as the Straw Hats captain eventually reaches his location.
294	31	"Resounding Bad News! Buster Call Invoked!"; Transliteration: "Hibikiwataru Kyōhō! Hatsudō Basutā Kōru!" (Japanese: 響き渡る凶報! 発動バスターコール!)	Hiroyuki Kakudō	Koga Naoki	January 21, 2007	March 29, 2015
At the Courthouse Plaza, the marines defeat Oimo and Kāshī and capture the Straw Hats' allies in the courthouse. Almost on the Bridge of Hesitation, which leads through the Gates of Justice, Spandam tries to contact the CP9 members at the tower to know what is going on with the pirates. But he learns too late that he accidentally invoked the Buster Call, causing ten battleships and five vice-admirals to be dispatched to Enies Lobby from the nearby navy headquarters. As Robin attempts to reason with him of what will happen to Enies Lobby once the Buster Call is invoked, Spandam makes another mistake by informing the whole island of the coming threat while admitting that he does not care if the 10,000 navy soldiers under him are obliterated in process. This causes the navy soldiers to leave their prisoners and flee to the coast. With the Buster Call underway, the CP9 operatives decide to end their respective matches quickly while Luffy begins his fight against Lucci.
295	32	"Five Namis? Nami Strikes Back With Mirages!"; Transliteration: "Gonin no Nami? Hangeki wa Shinkirō to Tomo ni!" (Japanese: 5人のナミ? 反撃は蜃気楼とともに!)	Yoshihiro Ueda	Yoshiyuki Suga	January 28, 2007	April 5, 2015
Lucci and Luffy begin their mutually anticipated duel while Kalifa manages to subject Nami to her Golden Time attack to completely smooth her into a weakling. But before Kailfa could deliver the death blow, Nami uses her Mirage Tempo to distract her before Chopper crashes through the wall. After attacking both the CP9 operative and an astonished Nami due to his inability to tell friend from foe in his Monster Point form, Chopper proceeds to rip Kalifa's bathtub out of its foundation and throws it down stairs where Sanji is. While Nami is deeply worried about Chopper, she realizes she needs to focus on Kalifa while learning her opponent's effects can be washed off with water. Kalifa attempts to stop Nami from reaching the torn up water pipes, only for Nami to use her Rain Tempo to restore herself. Now having scouted out Kalifa's abilities, Nami takes their fight to its climax by creating four illusionary doubles of herself.
296	33	"Nami's Decision! Fire at the Out-Of-Control Chopper!"; Transliteration: "Nami no Ketsudan! Bōsō Choppā o Ute!" (Japanese: ナミの決断! 暴走チョッパーを撃て!)	Masahiro Hosoda	Koga Naoki	February 4, 2007	April 12, 2015
The fight between Nami and Kalifa climaxes when the former unveils her Fata Morgana ability and the latter makes a final attempt to take Nami and her illusion clones out by sweeping the room with a tidal wave of bubbles. But Nami's victory has been ensured as Kalifa is struck by a horizontal lightning bolt. Franky, who had followed Chopper in climbing up the walls of the Tower of Law, arrives as Nami is about to retrieve the Number Two key from Kalifa's person. After discussing Chopper's Monster Point form, they conceive a plan to save Chopper as they find him in the room where the still handcuffed Zoro and Usopp are holding their own against Kaku and Jabra. After Franky uses his air pressure cannon to blast Chopper outside into the seawater, Nami uses Kalifa's key to free Zoro and Usopp from their shackles.
297	34	"Hunter Sanji Makes An Entrance? Elegy for a Lying Wolf!"; Transliteration: "Garibito Sanji Tōjō? Usotsuki Ōkami ni Okuru Banka" (Japanese: 狩人サンジ登場!? 嘘つき狼に贈る挽歌)	Katsumi Tokoro	Yoshiyuki Suga	February 11, 2007	April 19, 2015
After pulling the unconscious Chopper out of the sea once he returned to his usual form, making his peace with the reindeer, Franky ponders on how he can cross the wild waters to reach the Bridge of Hesitation. Chimney and Gonbe appear outside the secret passage and lead him to Kokoro and the tunnel. Past the room where Luffy is fighting Lucci, Spandam uses Funkfreed to stop Robin's attempted escape and proceeds to drag her by her hair towards the Gates of Justice. In the last remaining fight in the Tower of Law, Zoro and Kaku exchange heavy blows while Jabra overwhelms Usopp and Nami and is about to kill the former. Having been restored to normal after being exposed to the water in Kalifa's bathtub, Sanji steps in to deal with Jabra while telling Usopp to go find and save Robin.
298	35	"Fiery Kicks! Sanji's Full Course of Foot Techniques!"; Transliteration: "Shakunetsu no Keri! Sanji Ashiwaza no Furukōsu" (Japanese: 灼熱の蹴り! サンジ足技のフルコース)	Hiroyuki Kakudō	Koga Naoki	February 25, 2007	April 26, 2015
As Sanji takes over fighting Jabra, Nami drags Usopp from the fight to go after Robin. But while Nami intended to go down stairs, Usopp has a better idea. Meanwhile, Sanji starts exchanging blows with Jabra, who sends him flying into the hallway. Continuing their fight there, Jabra attempts to trick Sanji into lowering his guard by offering him his key with a made-up story of being Robin's long-lost brother. Sanji sees through the real trick and kicks Jabra but before getting the key he gets overwhelmed by Jabra going all out by revealing he is the only CP9 operative who can move after using the Iron Body skill. Sanji responds by making his foot red hot, unveiling his newest technique: Diable Jambe, whose intense heat bypasses Jabra's defenses and leads to his defeat in a fierce mid-air final clash.
299	36	"Fierce Sword Attacks! Zoro vs. Kaku, Powerful Sword Fighting Showdown!"; Transliteration: "Hakujin no Mōgeki! Zoro Tai Kaku Kyōryoku Sangeki Taiketsu" (Japanese: 白刃の猛襲! ゾロ対カク強力斬撃対決)	Hiroaki Miyamoto	Yoshiyuki Suga	March 4, 2007	May 3, 2015
As Spandam drags Robin along the Bridge of Hesitation, down the stairs in the room where Luffy is fighting Lucci, Franky arrives and offers his help. Luffy insists that Franky goes to save Robin. Reminded of himself when he was younger and tried to stop the sea train from carrying away his mentor, Franky agrees as Luffy attempts to ensure the cyborg's escape by restraining Lucci to no avail. At the same time, in the Tower of Law, Kaku shows Zoro the many tricks he can perform with his new Giraffe body that he got with his Devil Fruit powers, discovering new techniques in the process. Zoro states that Kaku's skills are not enough to defeat him.
300	37	"Demon God Zoro! An Incarnation of Asura Born From Fighting Spirit!"; Transliteration: "Kishin Zoro! Kihaku ga Miseta Ashura no Keshin" (Japanese: 鬼神ゾロ! 気迫が見せた阿修羅の化身)	Yoko Ikeda	Koga Naoki	March 11, 2007	May 10, 2015
After being relentlessly attacked, while hearing Kaku insulting Robin, Zoro's resulting rage manifested itself in a dark aura that Kaku thought to be a demon. Both swordsmen decide to finish the fight, with Zoro the victor as he unveils his new sword-style: Demon Aura Nine-Sword Style Asura. After giving Kaku the message from Paulie that he and the other CP9 agents are fired, Zoro takes the Number Five key as Sanji arrives. Meanwhile, as a fearful Robin makes a final attempt to keep herself from dragged across the Bridge of Hesitation by biting into the bridge's rim, Luffy attempts to hold Lucci long enough for Franky to make his way towards Robin. Luffy activates Second Gear while Lucci takes on his Man-Beast form. Despite this, Luffy is able to give Franky the opening needed to escape as he and the CP9 agent face each other.
301	38	"Spandam Frightened! The Hero on the Tower of Law!"; Transliteration: "Spandamu Kyōgaku! Shihō no Tō ni Tatsu Eiyū" (Japanese: スパンダム驚愕! 司法の塔に立つ英雄)	Yoshihiro Ueda	Yoshiyuki Suga	March 18, 2007	May 17, 2015
After the Gates of Justice has completely opened, having managed to loosen Robin's tooth grip on the bridge's rim, Spandam ties a rope around her waist and drags her towards the marines awaiting them. In the process, Spandam proudly reveals to Robin that he is the son of Spandaine, the previous CP9 head who was responsible for the Buster Call at Ohara. This causes Robin to be utterly livid yet powerless as stream of tears runs down her cheeks as all seems hopeless after Franky was seemingly taken out by a mine Spandam placed at the entrance to the Bridge of Hesitation. But at the last second, an explosive projectile hits the back of Spandam's head. A stream of projectiles falls on the marines gathered around him. The culprit is revealed to be Usopp, standing atop Tower of Law far from the marines' firing range. Robin attempts to run towards the other side the bridge before Franky saves her from being shot by the marines. After receiving the keys by Usopp, Franky frees Robin from the sea stone handcuffs, where she proceeds to vent her rage out on Spandam by slapping him repeatedly with her powers. As Usopp leaves to regroup with the others, he hears something before an explosion occurs.
302	39	"Robin Freed! Luffy vs. Lucci, Showdown Between Leaders!"; Transliteration: "Robin Kaihō! Rufi Tai Rutchi Chōjō Kessen" (Japanese: ロビン解放! ルフィ対ルッチ頂上決戦)	Directed by : Akira Shimizu; Storyboarded by : Seiji Okuda	Koga Naoki	March 25, 2007	May 31, 2015
As one of the naval ships blasts the top floors of the Tower of Law down, which takes out the drawbridge and falls into the waterfall, Robin and Franky goes ahead of the others to capture the ship Spandam had intended to use to bring the former to navy headquarters. Spandam has all men attempt to subdue the two by any means which fails comically. Meanwhile, Lucci figures out the double-edged nature of Luffy's Second Gear as he tells the youth that the Buster Call is about to begin. Anticipating that the other Straw Hats would take the underground passage, Lucci tears a hole into a wall of the underwater chamber to flood the passageway. The Fleet arrives and the Buster Call on Enies Lobby commences.
Boss Luffy Historical Special
303	40	"Boss Luffy is the Culprit? Track Down the Missing Great Cherry Tree!"; Transliteration: "Hannin wa Rufi Oyabun? Kieta Ōzakura o Oe" (Japanese: 犯人はルフィ親分? 消えた大桜を追え)	Munehisa Sakai	Hirohiko Kamisaka	April 1, 2007	June 7, 2015
It is springtime in Grand Jipang. One day remains until the yearly town festival, in which everyone gathers to have a picnic under the 1000-year-old sakura tree. Unfortunately, one of the town's children is sick and cannot attend. Luffy tries to think of a way to show him the tree in its bloom, but does not come up with a solution. When the tree disappears the next day, Luffy becomes the prime suspect. Robin investigates. The truth is that Buggy and his men stole the tree and brought it aboard the ship of Foxy the Silver Fox. She tips off Luffy, Usopp, and Sanji about the tree's location, who go there to retrieve it.
Enies Lobby
304	41	"I Can't Protect Anyone Unless I Win! Third Gear Activated!"; Transliteration: "Katenakya Dare mo Mamorenai! Gia Sado Shidō" (Japanese: 勝てなきゃ誰も守れない! ギア3始動)	Directed by : Makoto Sonoda; Storyboarded by : Naotoshi Shida	Yoshiyuki Suga	April 8, 2007	June 14, 2015
The Buster Call ships have reached Enies Lobby, passing the Bridge of Hesitation to spare Robin as they still want to capture her. Robin is traumatized by the onslaught as she is forced to witness the destruction for a second time in her life. At the same time, as Zoro and Sanji carry a wounded Usopp through the underground passage, Nami, Kokoro, Chimney, and Gonbe are ahead of them before they are forced to turn back as a consequence of the flooding caused by Lucci. Luffy and Lucci take their fight to the next floor above the sea level to resume their fight with the latter having the greater advantage after Luffy's Second Gear ended. Though Lucci offers Luffy a chance to run away and save his friends, the pirate knows not to trust the CP9 agent as he reveals his other trump card: Third Gear. Luffy blows air into his arm to have it grow before using Gum-Gum Giant Pistol to hit Lucci as the Buster Call ships witness a giant fist punching out of the pillar.
305	42	"Shivering Past! Dark Justice and Rob Lucci!"; Transliteration: "Senritsu no Kako! Yami no Seigi to Robu Rutchi" (Japanese: 戦慄の過去! 闇の正義とロブ·ルッチ)	Katsumi Tokoro	Koga Naoki	April 15, 2007	June 21, 2015
After Rob Lucci is knocked onto his ship by Luffy's enlarged fist, Vice Admiral Doberman orders his men to stand down when they failed to recognize the CP9 Agent. Doberman proceeds to reveal to his men that fifteen years ago, a 13-year-old Rob Lucci is sent as an emissary of the world government to help a country at war with pirates. Prior to his arrival, five hundred of the country's soldiers were taken hostage with the pirates' captain using them to take the king's throne. Allowing himself to be captured, Lucci murdered all five hundred hostages before executing the pirate's captain to resolve the matter. Though Doberman's crew were shocked by Lucci's actions, the Vice Admiral voices that is the reason why he is not taking actions in securing Robin as Lucci is suitable for the task. By that time, Luffy makes it to Doberman's ship and proceeds to fight Lucci as Vice Admiral Onigumo orders the ships to redirect their cannons to the gradually damaged vessel. In the underwater passageway, Zoro, Sanji and Usopp catch up to Nami and the others. The water flooding the passage behind them washes them back down the tunnel.
306	43	"A Mysterious Mermaid Appears? As Consciousness Fades Away..."; Transliteration: "Maboroshi no Ningyo Awareru? Usure Yuku Ishiki no Naka de" (Japanese: 幻の人魚現る? 薄れゆく意識のなかで)	Directed by : Keisuke Ōnishi; Storyboarded by : Yoshihiro Ueda	Yoshiyuki Suga	April 22, 2007	June 28, 2015
After fighting Lucci in Third Gear for a minute, barely escaping cannon fire in time, Luffy is left to cope with the technique's side effect of his body shrinking to a fraction of its original size for around the same time. Luffy attempts to hide from Lucci to no avail as Lucci finds and pins him into the wall and prepares to kill him. Luckily, the damage from Luffy's initial punch while in Third Gear takes its toll on Lucci's legs with the agent stopping in his tracks as Luffy regains his usual size. At the other end of the Bridge of Hesitation, Spandam makes an attempt on Robin's life with Funkfreed, only for Franky to stop the blade and force him to assume his elephant form. After explaining his reasons to support the Straw Hats, Franky crushes Spandam under Funkfreed's weight before he and Robin, who has managed to regain her composure, decide to take the escort ship. Meanwhile, having reached the entry point of Enies Lobby, the Galley-La foremen, the Franky Family, Yokozuna and the giants are forced to watch the fleeing marines allowed onto three of the Buster Call's battleships that soon drift out into position. In the underground passage, the drowning group of Nami, Zoro, Usopp, Sanji, Chopper, Chimney, and Gonbe are about to lose hope when they are saved by a mermaid: revealed to be Kokoro, to everyone's exasperated shock.
307	44	"Cannon Fire Sinks the Island! Franky's Lamentation!"; Transliteration: "Hōka ni Shizumu Shima! Furankī Munen no Sakebi" (Japanese: 砲火に沈む島! フランキー無念の叫び)	Hiroyuki Kakudō	Koga Naoki	April 29, 2007	July 12, 2015
Franky and Robin finish throwing the last remaining marines off of their commandeered convoy ship when Kokoro, in mermaid form, jumps aboard with the rest of the Straw Hats, Chimney, and Gonbe, managing to survive their brush with a watery grave due to the shock of their rescuer's appearance. Kokoro explains that mermaids like her are able to walk on land after thirty years' time before everyone is happy to see Robin. The joyous reunion does not last long as Zoro, Usopp, and Franky see the inferno that was Enies Lobby. Zoro notes that they should remain in case the navy focuses on them while waiting for Luffy. As Sanji joins the group, one of the ships announces that the Straw Hats' accomplices has been wiped out along with the main gate. This breaks Franky's heart to hear his gang have been slaughtered as he yells for Luffy that he better not get himself killed. As the fleet turns its attention toward the Bridge of Hesitation, having managed to wound Lucci in the legs, Luffy decides to finish the fight in his Second Gear at last time.
308	45	"Wait for Luffy! Mortal Combat on the Bridge of Hesitation!"; Transliteration: "Rufi o Mate! Tamerai no Hashi no Shitō!" (Japanese: ルフィを待て! ためらいの橋の死闘!)	Directed by : Hiroyuki Satō; Storyboarded by : Akiko Fujisawa	Yoshiyuki Suga	May 6, 2007	July 19, 2015
The fight between Luffy and Lucci reaches its climax as the CP9 assassin makes use of his most powerful technique: the Six King Pistol. The Bridge of Hesitation is surrounded by battleships that use their cannon fire to sever the bridge's first pillar, where Luffy is fighting, from the rest. Having cut off the Straw Hats' captain's retreat, the marines send their two hundred captains and commanders to recapture Robin while killing off the Straw Hats. During the fight, with Chopper still unable to move and Sanji nowhere to be seen, Robin joins her friends in fighting the Marine's strongest fighters. Meanwhile, after enduring punishing blows from Lucci, Luffy is at his limit and falls to the ground with Usopp standing on the bridge above looking down, horrified by the sight.
309	46	"Fists Full of Emotion! Luffy Unleashes Gatling with All His Might!"; Transliteration: "Kobushi ni Kometa Omoi! Rufi Konshin no Gātoringu" (Japanese: 拳に込めた想い! ルフィ渾身の銃乱打)	Makoto Sonoda	Koga Naoki	May 13, 2007	July 26, 2015
While the Straw Hats struggle to hold their own against those among Buster Call's fighting elite who have Devil Fruit powers, an unmasked Usopp sees Luffy collapsed on the ground in front of Lucci. Usopp cries out to him, telling him to get back up. But when Luffy is unable to move, Usopp resorts to provoking Lucci to face him. Presuming Luffy to be defeated, Lucci decides to take Usopp's suggestion with the intention of slaughtering the entire Straw Hat crew before returning to finish Luffy off. But Luffy, spurred by Usopp's words, gets back to his feet with a promise not to fall again until he wins. Luffy then engages Lucci in a final fist fight. Though Lucci hits him with his Six Kings Gun, Luffy manages to stay on his feet to Lucci's disbelief. Mustering all the strength he has left, Luffy delivers a barrage of blows strong Gum-Gum Jet Gatling enough to break through Lucci's Iron Body technique. Lucci's defeat is soon made public with a grinning Luffy collapsing to the floor.
310	47	"From the Sea, a Friend Arrives! The Straw Hats Share the Strongest Bond!"; Transliteration: "Tomo, Umi Yori Kuru! Mugiwara Ichimi Saikyō no Kizuna" (Japanese: 友, 海より来る! 麦わら一味最強の絆)	Yoshihiro Ueda	Yoshiyuki Suga	May 20, 2007	August 2, 2015
While everyone is in awe of Rob Lucci's defeat by Luffy, it is revealed by Transponder Snail loudspeakers that the Franky Family and Galley-La foremen faked their deaths while having found a means of escape. The Straw Hats are not so fortunate as the Marine admirals' forces renew their attack as their battleships destroy the stolen convoy ship. Sanji reappears to save Chopper, Kokoro, Chimney, and Gonbe. The Buster Call ships then destroy what remained of the Bridge of Hesitation to force the pirates onto the middle pillar before redirecting fire at the pillar where Luffy is to blast him to bits while he is unable to move. Things seem hopeless until Usopp once more hears a voice calling out for him and the rest of the Straw Hats to jump into the ocean. Despite many thinking Usopp had gone mad, the others start to hear it too with Robin using her Devil Fruit powers to toss Luffy out of the pillar as everyone jumps to the source of the mysterious voice: the Going Merry.
311	48	"Everyone Makes a Great Escape! The Road to Victory is for the Pirates!"; Transliteration: "Zen'in Dai Dasshutsu! Shōsha no Michi wa Kaizoku no Tame ni" (Japanese: 全員大脱出! 勝者の道は海賊のために)	Directed by : Hiroyuki Satō; Storyboarded by : Eisaku Inoue	Koga Naoki	May 27, 2007	August 9, 2015
Despite appearing to have sunk at Water 7, the Going Merry somehow made it to Enies Lobby with the Straw Hats have little time to speculate how their ship arrived as a livid Spandam, revealed to have survived being crushed by Funkfreed, orders the Buster Call battleships to destroy Robin and the Straw Hats. Though the battleships have already taken aim at the tiny ship that has snuck in between them at a near point-blank range, it turned out Sanji had snuck away to the control room for the Gates of Justice and closed it to restore the whirlpools. This results in the battleships' aim and manoeuvrability being severely hindered. The Straw Hats go on the defensive while Nami plans their escape route. After Robin uses her Devil Fruit powers to break Spandam's spine as revenge, the Straw Hats succeed with their escape with the Buster Call fleet utterly defeated.
312	49	"Thank You, Merry! Snow Falls over the Parting Sea!"; Transliteration: "Arigatō Merī! Yuki ni Kemuru Wakare no Umi" (Japanese: ありがとうメリー! 雪に煙る別れの海)	Katsumi Tokoro	Yoshiyuki Suga	June 3, 2007	August 16, 2015
With Enies Lobby and the Buster Call fleet out of sight, Usopp having resumed his Sniperking guise to confuse Luffy and Chopper while everyone was still puzzled over how the Going Merry reached them, the Straw Hats meet up with Iceberg on the Galley-La company ship. Suddenly the Going Merry begins to break apart and Luffy begs the shipwrights to repair their beloved ship. But Iceburg reveals that he found the Going Merry during Aqua Laguna and, having heard the mysterious voice, did everything in his power to fix it at the ship's behest. Iceberg convinces Luffy to let the Going Merry go. The Straw Hats captain gives his ship a proper burial by setting it ablaze as he and the other Straw Hats watches. While reminiscing about their time with the Going Merry, the ship bids the crew farewell and sinks into the sea.
Return to Water Seven
313	50	"Peace Interrupted! A Navy Vice Admiral with a Fist of Love!"; Transliteration: "Yaburareta Ansoku! Ai no Kobushi o Motsu Kaigun Chūjō" (Japanese: 破られた安息! 愛の拳を持つ海軍中将)	Hiroaki Miyamoto	Koga Naoki	June 10, 2007	August 23, 2015
Two days later, after returning to Water 7, Franky learns of Iceberg's plan to turn the city into a ship in response to Aqua Laguna's increasing intensity before learning that "the item" he ordered has arrived. At the temporary housing that Gallery-La arranged for the Straw Hats, Zoro is out while Kokoro, Chimney, and Gonbe come to a visit to see Luffy sleep-eating while Nami is in a slump. But Nami's outlook changes for the better when her tangerine trees and the Straw Hats' other possessions are returned to them. Franky then arrives and explains to the Straw Hats that he used the money he stole from them to buy a highly valuable piece of bark from the indestructible "Treasure Tree Adam". Franky continues to explain that he bought the fragment of Adam to create a "dream ship" and decided to give his creation to the Straw Hats for their use. The joyful moment is short lived when a marine platoon under Vice-Admiral Garp arrives at Water 7. Everyone is in shock as Garp breaks into the Straw Hats' quarters and manages to hurt Luffy when he wakes him up with his Fist of Love to Luffy's head. Luffy then further shocks the Straw Hats and everyone when he calls Garp his grandfather.
314	51	"The Strongest Family? Luffy's Father Revealed!"; Transliteration: "Saikyō no Kakei? Akasareta Rufi no Chichi!" (Japanese: 最強の家系? 明かされたルフィの父!)	Hiroyuki Kakudō	Yoshiyuki Suga	June 17, 2007	August 30, 2015
Garp is revealed to be Luffy's grandfather. His harsh upbringing methods explains Luffy's endurance. While Garp criticizes his grandson's choice to become a pirate, Zoro attempts to attack the navy soldiers until he and Luffy end up facing Garp's two personal attendants who are revealed to be old acquaintances they have met at the start of their journey: Koby who has achieved his dream and former captain Morgan's son Helmeppo. While he and his soldiers proceed to repair the wall he destroyed, Garp shocks everyone even more by revealing that Luffy's father is Monkey D. Dragon, who saved Luffy from Smoker in Loguetown, Although Luffy does not know of him and everyone else is horrificly dumbfounded by this mind-blowing revelation that Dragon had a son and that Dragon is Garp's son. Robin explains to Luffy that Dragon is the leader and founder of the Revolutionary Army, usurping the World Government and is among the government's most wanted criminals. Garp asks everyone to forget what he said.
315	52	"Its Name Is The New World! The Fate of the Grand Line!"; Transliteration: "Sono Na wa Shin Sekai! Gurando Rain no Yukue" (Japanese: その名は新世界! 偉大なる航路の行方)	Yoko Ikeda	Koga Naoki	June 24, 2007	September 13, 2015
After fixing the damage he caused, advised by his men to claim that the Straw Hats eluded him for the record, Garp returns to his ship while allowing Koby and Helmeppo to spend time with Luffy. During that time, prior to swimming in the Galley-La pool, Nami learns of the Navy's means to travel safety through Sea-King infested waters and of the Naval scientist, Dr. Vegapunk. Afterwards, after he and others encourage him to get strong enough to capture them, Koby takes his leave while telling Luffy that he will meet him again in the New World. Later, as the Straw Hats start a party at the Galley-La's company pool with the Franky Family and the giants invited, Robin is approached by Aokiji who speaks to her through a wall. He explains while he was forced as a naval officer to kill Saul, his best friend, he also let her escape to honor him so she can find a place to belong. While he admitted that he decided to kill Robin when she was unable to find a place she would belong, Aokiji expresses relief that she found her place within the Straw Hats before taking his leave to see what will come from it.
316	53	"Shanks Makes a Move! The Linchpin to the Reckless Era!"; Transliteration: "Shankusu Ugoku! Bōsōsuru Jidai e no Kusabi" (Japanese: シャンクス動く! 暴走する時代への楔)	Takahiro Imamura	Hirohiko Kamisaka	July 1, 2007	September 20, 2015
A fleet of navy ships failed to prevent "Red-Haired" Shanks from meeting with Whitebeard, putting the World Government on high alert over two pirate Emperors crossing paths. After the least experienced crew members under Whitebeard are knocked out by Shanks's Haki, he offers Whitebeard a large bottle of sake as a peace offering. While they drink, they reminisce about old times and wounds with Shanks explaining that he bet his lost arm on the new age. Shanks then explains his reason to see Whitebeard is to make a request for him to stop Portgas D. Ace chasing after Blackbeard. Laughing his request off, Whitebeard explains he intends to make Blackbeard pay for the crew member he killed. Their differences in opinion over the matter causes a clash between them that causes the heavens above to part. Back at Water 7, as the Franky Family are relieved to find no mention of them and the Straw Hats' allies in a report on the events at Enies Lobby, Iceberg and the Galley-La Company arrive to help Franky to build the Straw Hats' new ship. The Straw Hats plan to head out into the city to gather supplies despite Luffy having spent almost all their remaining money on the party.
317	54	"The Girl in Search of Her Yagara! Great Search in the City of Water!"; Transliteration: "Yagara o Sagasu Shōjo! Mizu no Miyako Daisōsasen!" (Japanese: ヤガラを探す少女! 水の都大捜査線!)	Yoshihiro Ueda	Hirohiko Kamisaka	July 8, 2007	September 27, 2015
While searching for supplies, Luffy and Chopper are approached by a girl named Abi to search for her lost yagara bull Bluefin, who had appeared to her in a dream. During Aqua Laguna, Abi's family had left their 100-year-old yagara bull at home and they find him gone when their came back. With the exception of Abi, everyone believes that Bluefin is dead. Though Robin used her Devil Fruit powers to help them, the search all over the city with no success. The group come across a yagara who, as Chopper translated, heard Bluefin coming to someone's aid during Aqua Laguna. After finding a piece of his scarf, they track him into the underwater passages of the city. But it turned out that Bluefin had died during the storm and reached out to Abi to find peace while she cares for the newborn yagara he gave his life to save.
318	55	"Mothers are Strong! Zoro's Hectic Household Chores!"; Transliteration: "Haha wa Tsuyoshi! Zoro no Dotabata Kaji Tetsudai" (Japanese: 母は強し! ゾロのドタバタ家事手伝い)	Directed by : Keisuke Ōnishi; Storyboarded by : Naotoshi Shida	Koga Naoki	July 15, 2007	October 4, 2015
As the others look for supplies, Zoro strolls the city in search of a replacement katana despite lacking money to afford a new sword. There, he is picked up by Michael and Hoichael, two idle boys from the backstreets he met while Garp was in Water 7. The two attempt to help him find a sword shop while calling him their "big brother" to his dismay before meeting their foster-mother who takes him to their home to help in the chores. Eventually, after forced to wear a tight-fitting shirt, Zoro manages to escape but attempts to hide from his crew out of pride. Eventually, Zoro is found by Hoichael and learns that the foster mother and her "children" have been abducted by a loan shark he saw attempting to collect interest from a fulfilled debt. After Zoro rescues the family, the foster mother allows him to return to "his family" before chasing after him to give him back his shirt.
319	56	"Sanji's Shock! Mysterious Old Man and His Super Yummy Cooking!"; Transliteration: "Sanji Shōgeki! Nazo no Jii-san to Hageuma Ryōri" (Japanese: サンジ衝撃! 謎の爺さんと激ウマ料理)	Makoto Sonoda	Yoshiyuki Suga	July 22, 2007	October 11, 2015
While Chimney and Gonbe accompany him to gather groceries, Sanji is forced by the pair to take them to a small floating restaurant owned by a drunken old man for lunch. Sanji notices the man to be deep asleep and decides to prepare something himself. While he is cooking, the old man wakes up and immediately recognizes Sanji's way of handling the carving knife and reveals himself as a friend of Sanji's mentor "Red-Leg" Zeff. He insists that Sanji taste some of his cooking. Sanji, though worried by the old man's cooking style is amazed by the flavor. Curious to know the secret of the old man's secret ingredient, Sanji leaves Chimney and Gonbe with the old man as he searches around the city for seasonings that might have been used. When Sanji gets to eat an onigiri made by the old man, he realizes the ingredient is a special salt. The old man reveals that the waters of Aqua Laguna carries salt from the All Blue and litters the rooftops of the lower parts of the city. As Sanji heads back after stocking up on ingredients, he spots Usopp on the beach practicing ways to return to the crew. Chimney and Gonbe meet up with Kokoro as she observes Franky and Iceberg building the Straw Hats' new ship with the Galley-La foremen.
320	57	"Everyone Finally Has A Bounty! A Pirate Group Worth Over Six Hundred Million!"; Transliteration: "Tsui ni Zen'in Shōkinkubi! Rokuoku Koe no Ichimi!" (Japanese: ついに全員賞金首! 6億超えの一味!)	Hiroyuki Kakudō	Yoshiyuki Suga	August 19, 2007	October 18, 2015
While the Galley-La foremen, Iceburg and Franky take a break after the Franky Family brings everyone a meal, Iceburg suggests to Franky that he joins the Straw Hats when they leave with the ship. Franky and Iceburg continue working through the night while the foremen pass out unable to keep up. Meanwhile, Usopp's first attempt to rejoin the Straw Hats fails. The next day, the Straw Hats find out from Kokoro that their Log Pose is pointing under the sea to Fishman Island and on the way they will have to pass through the Florian Triangle, where many ships have disappeared. Chimney, Gonbe, Kiwi and Mozu arrive with good news, their ship has been completed. The Franky Family suddenly show up with the bad news. Every Straw Hat as well as Usopp as Sniperking and Franky now have bounties on each of their heads. The Franky Family fear their leader might end up getting captured again so they plea with Luffy to take Franky with him by any means.
321	58	"The King of Animals that Overlooks the Sea! The Dream Ship Magnificently Completed!"; Transliteration: "Umi o Nozomu Hyakujū no Ō! Yume no Fune Dōdō Kansei!" (Japanese: 海を臨む百獣の王! 夢の船堂々完成!)	Naoyuki Itō	Hirohiko Kamisaka	August 26, 2007	October 25, 2015
When the Straw Hats arrive at the coast, Iceburg unveils the ship while Franky is nowhere to be seen. Iceburg gives his opinion that Franky is hiding because if he were asked face to face to join the crew, he would not be able to refuse; he wants to go but believes staying in Water 7 is his responsibility. Iceberg proceeds to tell the Straw Hats that they might have to make him join the crew by force. At the Franky House, when Franky refuses to leave, Franky's men take matters into their own hands: they steal Franky's beloved jammer-style briefs and start luring him to the Straw Hats by playing keep-away with the briefs with Franky in tow. Amid the town, while the populace are horrified by the streaking Franky chasing after them, Luffy and Chopper show up to assist in the keep-away before Sanji and Zoro seize Franky and shove him into the Franky Family's shoot-anything-cannon, and have him shot in front of the new ship. Luffy aboard the ship, has the briefs and offers to return them to Franky only if he agrees to join the crew.
322	59	"Goodbye My Dear Underlings! Franky Departs!"; Transliteration: "Saraba Itoshiki Kobun-tachi! Furankī Tatsu" (Japanese: さらば愛しき子分達! フランキー発つ)	Yoshihiro Ueda	Yoshiyuki Suga	September 2, 2007	November 8, 2015
Despite Luffy offer to return his briefs if he agrees to join his crew, as the town populace continue to denounce his nudity, Franky still refuses to the point of being unashamed of being bottomless. Taking Iceberg's advice to heart, Robin uses her Devil Fruit powers to grab Franky by the testicles and threatens to crush them if he continues to refuse. As Franky tries to brave through the agonising torture, Iceburg confronts Franky and explains that the real reason he wants to stay is out of guilt. Iceburg tells him that he needs to forgive himself as he and Tom had already forgiven him for his past mistakes. Iceburg believe he needs to go with the Straw Hats and see his dream through. Franky's men arrive with Franky's luggage thanking Franky for everything and telling him they wanted him to go and be happy. Franky starts crying while pretending to still be in pain, Robin revealing she had stopped after the first time. Sanji and Zoro suddenly arrive in a hurry, revealing that Garp has returned and is on his way to capture them. Luffy returns the briefs to Franky, who regains his usual gusto and subsequently agrees to join the crew.
323	60	"Departing the City of Water! Usopp Mans Up and Brings Closure to the Duel!"; Transliteration: "Shukkō Mizu no Miyako! Otoko Usoppu Kettō no Kejime" (Japanese: 出港水の都! 男ウソップ決闘のケジメ)	Katsumi Tokoro	Yoshiyuki Suga	September 9, 2007	November 15, 2015
With Franky now a member of the Straw Hats, the crew sets sail to evade Garp as he returned to Water 7 with direct orders from Fleet-Admiral Sengoku. When Franky notices that Usopp has not yet returned to them, Luffy explains to Franky that Sanji saw Usopp practicing ways to return to the group a few days prior. Luffy is then convinced by Zoro, who threatens to leave the crew, that the only way they can welcome back Usopp is if his first words are an apology. Unfortunately as Usopp runs to the dock, his window of opportunity is closing quickly as the Straw Hats attempt to fend off the onslaught of cannonballs thrown by Garp. When Usopp arrives, he attempts to rejoin the crew as if nothing happened with his words falling on deaf ears. It is only after Usopp realizes all of his faults and begs for apologys in sadness that a tearful Luffy reaches out and pulls him aboard.
324	61	"Wanted Posters Make It Around the World! Celebrations in Their Hometowns as the Ship Moves Forward!"; Transliteration: "Meguru Tehaisho! Kokyō wa Odoru Fune wa Susumu!" (Japanese: めぐる手配書! 故郷は踊る 船は進む!)	Tetsuya Endō	Koga Naoki	September 16, 2007	November 22, 2015
With Usopp's reconciliation, the crew is back together, the Straw Hats focus their efforts on escaping while agreeing to use the name that Iceberg suggested: the Thousand Sunny. Franky goes to the engine room to activate one of its special abilities while Luffy says goodbyes to his grandfather, Koby, and everyone on Water 7. Nervous and enraged by his grandson's audacity, Garp takes out his gigantic iron ball and chain to sink the Straw Hats. Luckily, the Sunny's emergency acceleration device activates and blasts the ship a kilometre away beyond Garp's reach. Some time later, life resumes on Water 7 as Kokoro returns to her station while Iceberg offers the Franky Family a job at Galley-La. Meanwhile, the crew celebrates Robin's return, Usopp's reconciliation and Franky's welcomed while preparing to head towards Fishman Island, their wanted posters circulate around the world. Everyone in their hometowns, Baratie, Alabasta, and Smoker have heard about the crew's deeds at Enies Lobby. The posters even reach the Revolutionary Army with their leader Dragon impressed and confident he and Luffy will cross paths in the future as father and son.
325	62	"The Most Heinous Power! Blackbeard's Darkness Attacks Ace!"; Transliteration: "Saikyō no Nōryoku! Ēsu o Osou Kurohige no Yami" (Japanese: 最凶の能力! エースを襲う黒ひげの闇)	Yoko Ikeda	Hirohiko Kamisaka	September 23, 2007	December 6, 2015
Three days before the Thousand Sunny's maiden voyage, on Banaro Island, an island near Water 7, Blackbeard receives the news of the Straw Hats' devastation of Enies Lobby and decides to pursue them. However, his plans are interrupted by Ace, who has come to avenge a crewmate that was murdered by Blackbeard. Ordering his men back after failing to convince Ace to join his crew, Blackbeard justifies his actions because his crewmate was in possession of a Devil Fruit he long sought after. Blackbeard then reveals the power of the Dark-Dark Fruit by destroying the entire town. Blackbeard then overwhelms Ace, making him another offer to join his crew. Ace still refuses and the two unleash their strongest attacks on each other. The fight between these two pirates will later be known as the trigger for a massive incident that happens in the future.
Ice Hunter
326	63	"The Mysterious Band of Pirates! Sunny and the Dangerous Trap!"; Transliteration: "Nazo no Kaizoku Go Ichigyō! Sanī-gō to Kikken na Wana" (Japanese: 謎の海賊ご一行!サニー号と危険な罠)	Munehisa Sakai	Hirohiko Kamisaka	October 14, 2007	December 13, 2015
After departing Water 7, the Straw Hat crew are all enjoying the features their brand new ship has to offer. Nami takes a bath, Chopper in his office and Luffy catches a shark while Usopp encourages him to put it in their aquarium. They hurry down to see it along with the rest of the fishes only to find the Shark had eaten the other fish already which Sanji yells at them for. Meanwhile, Franky tells them about the ship's greatest feature: the "Soldier Dock System". The bottom of the Ship is equipped with 5 Docking Stations, numbered 0-4 where each one has something unique so no matter what trouble they are in, they have a solution. As it begins to snow, the Straw Hats find a ship drifting with hungry and sick fishermen. Luffy lets them onboard the Sunny and Chopper heals them one by one before Sanji feeds everyone. Eventually, the cabin boy Jiro touches his own left arm and remembers something that makes him beg for Chopper's help with someone onboard their own ship. Chopper follows him to a hidden room where a man with serious wounds is lying in bed, who cannot be moved in his condition. Chopper says he must be operated on right there and then. After the fisherman surprise everyone with a barrel of wine and Luffy offers to tow them back home, everyone is suddenly asleep around the ship. As the fishermen debate whether to go through with their original plans for the crew and ship, Sanji, Robin, and Franky surprise them having not fallen for the drugged wine while Zoro stays indoors.
327	64	"Sunny in a Pinch! Roar, Secret Superspeed Mecha!"; Transliteration: "Sanī-gō Pinchi! Unare Chōsoku no Himitsu Meka" (Japanese: サニー号ピンチ!唸れ超速の秘密メカ)	Hiroaki Miyamoto	Yoshiyuki Suga	October 21, 2007	January 3, 2016
Though the fishermen attempt to retreat, the Straw Hats refuse to let them escape after they assume that they have kidnapped Chopper. The Straw Hats suddenly find themselves surrounded by a fleet of Marine ships, unaware that they are optical illusions and use the Soldier Dock System to escape with the fisherman in tow into a glacial field. Once clear they board the fisherman's ship looking for Chopper. Chopper assures everyone that he was fine and was tending to a patient Jiro took him to. Jiro explains that the fishermen are actually the Phoenix Pirates, the patient is their Captain, Puzzle and that their ship ended up in its current state after an encounter in the New World. Later after hearing that the Straw Hats have entered the glacial field as planned, the Accino family begin to move forward with their plans to collect the bounty on the Straw Hats in honor of their leader Don Accino for his birthday.
328	65	"The Dream Sinking in the New World! The Disillusioned Pirate, Puzzle!"; Transliteration: "Shinsekai ni Shizumu Yume! Shitsui no Kaizoku Pazūru" (Japanese: 新世界に沈む夢!失意の海賊パズール)	Takahiro Imamura	Koga Naoki	October 28, 2007	January 10, 2016
Trapped by moving icebergs, the Straw Hats try to figure a way out while avoiding being crushed. Puzzle awakes after Chopper's treatment only to reveal some harsh realities on the awaiting crew as he considers his dream to become king of the pirates over. Later, Zoro ends up lost as he cuts an iceberg blocking their way. An iceberg attack strands Luffy and Chopper on the Phoenix Pirates' ship while the Thousand Sunny is trapped by ice as it is found by Arbell, Salchow, Hockera, and Lil of the Accino family. Though they expected an easy catch, the Accino family members are shocked to see the Thousand Sunny using its Coup de Burst to escape. But Arbell convinces Lil to use her flying fish to snatch the Straw Hats' jolly roger to keep them from fully escaping out of pride.
329	66	"The Assassins Attack! The Great Battle on Ice Begins!"; Transliteration: "Osoi Kuru Shikaku-tachi! Kōri Ue Daibatoru Kaishi" (Japanese: 襲い来る刺客たち!氷上大バトル開始)	Directed by : Hiroyuki Satō; Storyboarded by : Naotoshi Shida	Takuya Masumoto	November 4, 2007	January 17, 2016
Using the Shark Submarine, Nami and Franky find out that penguins are moving the icebergs before they are attacked with Usopp and Sanji knocked off the Thousand Sunny into an ice cavern. Though Nami and Franky evaded the penguins, they are confronted by Hockera while Usopp and Sanji encounter Arbelle and her husband Salchow. At the same time, as Robin encounters Lil, Luffy and Chopper and the Phoenix Pirates are attacked by Brindo who is after the bounty on both Luffy and Puzzle. Meanwhile, Zoro stumbles upon Lovely Land, the Accino Family's HQ.
330	67	"The Straw Hat's Hard Battles! A Pirate Soul Risking It All for the Flag!"; Transliteration: "Taikusen Mugiwara Ichimi! Hata ni Kakeru Kaizokudamashī" (Japanese: 大苦戦麦わら一味!旗にかける海賊魂)	Sumio Watanabe	Tsuyoshi Sakurai	November 11, 2007	January 24, 2016
Brindo reveals his family possesses the Straw Hat flag, provoking Luffy to follow him to Lovely Land. But Puzzle captures Brindo and binds him with his chains to the mast. Elsewhere, while Usopp provoked Salchow by knocking out Arbelle with Sanji equally irate, Franky managed to beat Hockera with what cola he has left. However, after Franky returns to the Shark Submarine, the freezing pucks froze the sub solid as Hockera proceeds to take his captives to Lovely Land. As Lil accepts Robin's request to be led to Lovely Land, Zoro is aimlessly wandering inside the place as Don Accino demands progress from his eldest son Canpacino.
331	68	"Hot Full Throttle! The Twin's Magnetic Power Drawing Near!"; Transliteration: "Atsukurushisa Zenkai! Semaru Futago no Jiryoku Pawā" (Japanese: 暑苦しさ全開! 迫る双子の磁力パワー)	Directed by : Hiroyuki Satō; Storyboarded by : Makoto Sonoda	Isao Murayama	November 18, 2007	January 31, 2016
Due to Sanji's ideals, he and Usopp ended up captured by Albelle and Salchow. Meanwhile, Brindo tricks Luffy and company to summon his elder twin brother Canpacino to the Phoenix Pirates' ship and free him. Due to their 'brotherly love' making them human magnets, Canpachino and Brindo use their unique fighting style to separate Luffy from the others. As the events occurred, Zoro encounters Don Accino and the two knock back a few drinks together before the Straw Hats' jolly roger is delivered. Accino admits that Zoro's 120 million bounty is quite a hard thing to pass up.
332	69	"Mansion of Great Chaos! The Enraged Don and the Captured Crew!"; Transliteration: "Daikōran no Kan! Ikaru Don to Toraware no Ichimi" (Japanese: 大混乱の館! 怒るドンと囚われの一味)	Katsumi Tokoro	Yōichi Takahashi	November 25, 2007	February 7, 2016
When Zoro attempts to reclaim the Straw Hats' flag, he provoked Don Accino as he reveals the power of the Heat Heat Fruit: the ability to melt anything within his aura of heat. Luckily, before a fight could ensue, Hockera, Albelle, and Salchow manage to activate a trapdoor that sends Zoro to where the other imprisoned Straw Hats are placed save Robin. Elsewhere, Brindo and Canpacino are forced to cease their fight with Luffy when they received a call of their father being in a bad mode. As Luffy, Chopper and Jiro resolve to reach Lovely Land to reclaim their crews' flags with Puzzle following from afar, the rest of the Straw Hats are freed with indirect assistance from Robin and attempt to find their jolly roger to save face.
333	70	"The Return of the Phoenix! The Dream of the Pirate Flag Sworn to a Friend!"; Transliteration: "Fushichō Futatabi! Tomo ni Chikau Kaizokuki no Yume" (Japanese: 不死鳥ふたたび! 友に誓う海賊旗の夢)	Tetsuya Endō	Yoshiyuki Suga	December 2, 2007	February 14, 2016
Seeing that Luffy had arrived on Lovely Island, and Zoro running off to find Don Accino's chambers, Nami, Sanji, Usopp and Franky decide to distract Luffy while Robin finds their flag. But while Robin ends up being lured into a trap by Lil as part of the girl's plan to coerce her into remaining with her, Hokera is taken out by Franky after being outwitted by Chopper and Jiro while Albelle and Slachow are taken out by Nami and Sanji. Puzzle, having regained his confidence, battles Canpacino while Luffy defeats Brindo prior to Accino emerging from his home.
334	71	"The Red Hot Decisive Battle! Luffy vs. The Scorching Don!"; Transliteration: "Atsu Atsu Chōkessen! Rufi vs. Shakuretsu no Don" (Japanese: アツアツ超決戦! ルフィvs灼熱のドン)	Directed by : Sumio Watanabe; Storyboarded by : Kenji Yokoyama	Yoshiyuki Suga	December 9, 2007	February 21, 2016
The Heat Heat Fruit gives Accino all sorts of powers, from throwing blasts of heat, heating his skin to extreme temperatures, to even being able to fly by blowing steam out his nose. Meanwhile, Puzzle defeats Canpacino, the rest of the Straw Hats search for their flag, and Robin and Lil reconcile with one another. Outside, the fight really heats up when Luffy activates Second Gear, but Accino isn't going to fall so easily.
335	72	"Waiting in the New World! Farewell to the Brave Pirates!"; Transliteration: "Shinsekai de Matsu! Isamashiki Kaizoku to no Wakare" (Japanese: 新世界で待つ! 勇ましき海賊との別れ)	Hiroaki Miyamoto	Koga Naoki	December 16, 2007	February 28, 2016
After a grueling struggle, Luffy finally defeats Don Accino with a red-hot Bazooka. With a little help from Lil, the two stolen flags are finally recovered, and the crew manages to get it back on the ship before Luffy returns. The defeated Accino Family sail away with the Don in tow and finally have a belated birthday celebration, while Albelle makes up with her sister. The Phoenix Pirates go to battle with Canpaccino and the remaining grunts, Puzzle promising to meet the Straw Hats again in the New World.
336	73	"Chopperman to the Rescue! Protect the TV Station by the Shore!"; Transliteration: "Shutsudō Choppāman! Mamore Nagisa no Terebi Kyoku" (Japanese: 出動チョッパーマン！守れ渚のTV局)	Gō Koga	Takuya Masumoto	December 23, 2007	March 6, 2016
Chopper Man and Namifia are low on money. Dr. Usodabada constructs a plan to bring down Chopper Man while collecting fame for himself and a new crew to replace his non helpful duo: Sanjilops and Zorogilla. His plan is to take over the TV Station and televise his demands. Not that anyone really cares except Chopper Man, who only wants to join for the rare Air Force C-Max Collectors item. After a wrestling match between the two, which ended in Chopper Man's victory, and even a mecha battle, which again Chopper Man won, the evil Doctor is sent flying, and Chopper Man reaches celebrity status.

== Home media release ==
=== Japanese ===
Toei Animation (Japan, Region 2 DVD)
Volume		Episodes	Release date	Ref.
9thシーズン エニエス·ロビー篇	piece.01	264–266	January 9, 2008	
9thシーズン エニエス·ロビー篇	piece.02	267–269	February 6, 2008	
9thシーズン エニエス·ロビー篇	piece.03	270–272	March 5, 2008	
9thシーズン エニエス·ロビー篇	piece.04	273–275	April 2, 2008	
9thシーズン エニエス·ロビー篇	piece.05	276–278	May 7, 2008	
9thシーズン エニエス·ロビー篇	piece.06	284–286	June 4, 2008	
9thシーズン エニエス·ロビー篇	piece.07	287–289	July 7, 2008	
9thシーズン エニエス·ロビー篇	piece.08	290, 293–294	August 6, 2008	
9thシーズン エニエス·ロビー篇	piece.09	295–297	September 3, 2008	
9thシーズン エニエス·ロビー篇	piece.10	298–300	October 1, 2008	
9thシーズン エニエス·ロビー篇	piece.11	301–302, 304	November 5, 2008	
9thシーズン エニエス·ロビー篇	piece.12	305–307	December 3, 2008	
9thシーズン エニエス·ロビー篇	piece.13	308–310	January 7, 2009	
9thシーズン エニエス·ロビー篇	piece.14	311–313	February 4, 2009	
9thシーズン エニエス·ロビー篇	piece.15	314–316	March 4, 2009	
9thシーズン エニエス·ロビー篇	piece.16	317–319	April 1, 2009	
9thシーズン エニエス·ロビー篇	piece.17	320–322	May 13, 2009	
9thシーズン エニエス·ロビー篇	piece.18	323–325	June 6, 2009	
9thシーズン エニエス·ロビー篇	piece.19	326–328	July 1, 2009	
9thシーズン エニエス·ロビー篇	piece.20	329–331	August 5, 2009	
9thシーズン エニエス·ロビー篇	piece.21	332–335	September 2, 2009	
9thシーズン特別篇「麦わら劇場&麦わら海賊譚」		279–283	May 23, 2008	
時代劇SP｢ルフィ親分捕物帖2｣通常版		291–292, 303	August 1, 2007	
ONE PIECE ワンピース・ヒーロースペシャル!		336, 492	November 21, 2011	
ONE PIECE Log Collection	"NICO ROBIN"	264–278, 284	July 27, 2012	
ONE PIECE Log Collection	"CP9"	285–290, 293–302, 304–306	July 27, 2012	
ONE PIECE Log Collection	"FRANKY"	307–325	August 24, 2012	

=== English ===
In North America, this season was recategorized as "Season Five" for its DVD release by Funimation Entertainment. The Australian Season Five sets were renamed Collection 22 through 27.

Funimation Entertainment (USA, Region 1), Manga Entertainment (UK, Region 2), Madman Entertainment (Australia, Region 4)
Volume		Episodes	Release date			ISBN	Ref.
Volume		Episodes	USA	UK	Australia	ISBN	Ref.
Season Five	Voyage One	264–275	July 23, 2013	N/A	September 18, 2013	ISBN 1-4210-2730-5	
Season Five	Voyage Two	276–287	September 3, 2013	N/A	November 20, 2013	ISBN 1-4210-2734-8	
Season Five	Voyage Three	288–299	October 15, 2013	N/A	February 19, 2014	ISBN 1-4210-2751-8	
Season Five	Voyage Four	300–312	December 3, 2013	N/A	May 21, 2014	ISBN 1-4210-2761-5	
Season Five	Voyage Five	313–324	January 14, 2014	N/A	June 18, 2014	ISBN 1-4210-2784-4	
Season Five	Voyage Six	325–336	March 4, 2014	N/A	July 23, 2014	ISBN 1-4210-2842-5	
Collections	Collection 11	253–275	January 13, 2015	August 10, 2015	N/A	ISBN N/A	
Collections	Collection 12	276–299	April 21, 2015	December 28, 2015	N/A	ISBN N/A	
Collections	Collection 13	300–324	July 14, 2015	October 3, 2016	N/A	ISBN N/A	
Collections	Collection 14	325–348	November 10, 2015	November 28, 2016	N/A	ISBN N/A	
Treasure Chest Collection	Three	206-299	N/A		December 7, 2016	ISBN N/A	
Treasure Chest Collection	Four	300-396	N/A		December 7, 2016	ISBN N/A	
Voyage Collection	Six	253-299	N/A		January 10, 2018	ISBN N/A	
Voyage Collection	Seven	300-348	N/A		February 21, 2018	ISBN N/A	
