= Won't Get Fooled Again (disambiguation) =

"Won't Get Fooled Again" is a 1971 song by The Who.

Won't Get Fooled Again may also refer to:

- Won't Get Fooled Again (EP), a 1988 EP by The Who that includes the song
- "Won't Get Fooled Again" (Criminal Minds episode)
- "Won't Get Fooled Again" (Farscape episode)
- "Won't Get Fooled Again" (Instant Star episode)

== See also ==
- "Won't Get Fueled Again", an episode of CSI: Miami
- Don't Get Fooled Again, a chapter of the manga One Piece
