= List of One Piece chapters (807–1015) =

Volume 81 of One Piece, released in Japan by Shueisha on April 4, 2016

One Piece is a Japanese manga series written and illustrated by Eiichiro Oda which has been translated into various languages and spawned a substantial media franchise, including animated and live action television series, films, video games, and associated music and merchandise. It follows the adventures of the teenaged boy and pirate captain Monkey D. Luffy, whose body gained the properties of rubber after he accidentally ate a supernatural fruit, as he travels the oceans in search of the series' titular treasure and organizes a diverse crew, named the Straw Hats.

In Japan, the series is published by Shueisha. Individual chapters have been published regularly in the shōnen manga anthology Weekly Shōnen Jump since July 22, 1997 and tankōbon format volumes (each collecting 10 to 12 chapters) have been published since December 24, 1997. The series spans over 1175 chapters and, as of March 2026, has 114 tankōbon volumes, making One Piece the 20th longest manga series by volume count.

The series has been translated and released in multiple countries. English localization began in North America, where Viz Media currently serializes One Piece in the Shonen Jump digital vault simultaneously with Japan. It originally published its English language adaptation of the series in the now-defunct monthly print anthology Shonen Jump starting with the magazine's launch in November 2002. It also publishes tankōbon format books since June 2003, which have been collected into omnibus editions incorporating three tankōbon each since December 2009; chapters and books also are published digitally through its website. In the United Kingdom, the tankōbon were published by Gollancz Manga, starting March 2006, until Viz Media took over after the fourteenth volume. In Australia and New Zealand, the English volumes have been distributed by Madman Entertainment since November 10, 2008. By October 6, 2009, only 22 volumes had been released in English. However, as announced in July 2009, Viz Media increased that number to 53 by June 2010, using an accelerated publishing schedule of five volumes per month during the first half of 2010. As of November 2025, 110 volumes of the English version have been officially released by Viz Media.

== Volumes ==
No.	Title	Original release date	English release date
81	Let's Go See the Cat Viper; Nekomamushi no Danna ni Ai ni Yukou (ネコマムシの旦那に会いに行こう)	April 4, 2016; 978-4-08-880648-8	February 7, 2017; 978-1-4215-9159-9
807. "Ten Days Earlier" (10日前, "Tōka Mae"); 808. "Duke Dogstorm" (イヌアラシ公爵, "Inuarashi Kōshaku"); 809. "The Cat Viper" (ネコマムシの旦那, "Nekomamushi no Danna"); 810. "The Twirly Hat Crew Arrives" (ぐるわらの一味、上陸, "Guruwara no Ichimi, Jōriku"); 811. "ROKO"; 812. "Capone 'Gang' Bege" (カポネ・"ギャング"ベッジ, "Kapone 'Gyangu' Bejji"); 813. "Tea Party Invitation" (お茶会の招待状, "Ochakai no Shōtaijō"); 814. "Let's Go See the Cat Viper" (ネコマムシの旦那に会いに行こう, "Nekomamushi no Danna ni Ai ni Yukou"); 815. "Take Me With You!!" (おれも連れてけ!!, "Ore mo Tsureteke!!"); 816. "Dog vs. Cat" (イヌVSネコ, "Inu Bāsasu Neko")
Nami recounts their escape from the Big Mom Pirates shortly after leaving Dressrosa. On Zou, Jack of the Animal Kingdom Pirates, who are allied with Kaido, attacked the minks and laid waste to their city, seeking a ninja named Raizo. The leaders of the minks, Duke Dogstorm and the Cat Viper, denied any knowledge of Raizo and repelled Jack's forces; he released a poison gas weapon and fled upon learning Doflamingo had been defeated, so the minks credited the Straw Hats with Jack's retreat. As the crew on the Sunny had brought Caesar, he was able to neutralize the gas. Several days later, Capone Bege and Pekoms, working for Big Mom, arrive with an invitation for Sanji: he leaves to marry Big Mom's daughter Charlotte Pudding, which will bring his family (the Vinsmokes) and their mercenary kingdom, Germa 66, under Big Mom. When Kin'emon and Kanjuro finally manage to climb Zunesha, the Straw Hats panic, thinking the minks will be infuriated to see samurai from Wano, who were responsible for their devastation. Instead, the minks have a longstanding alliance with the samurai clan and have been hiding Raizo all along.
82	The World Is Restless; Zawatsuku Sekai (ざわつく世界)	July 4, 2016; 978-4-08-880726-3	May 2, 2017; 978-1-4215-9269-5
817. "Raizo of the Mist" (霧の雷ぞう, "Kiri no Raizō"); 818. "Inside the Whale" (くじらの中で, "Kujira no Naka de"); 819. "Momonosuke, Heir to the Kozuki Clan" (光月家跡取り・モモの助, "Kōzuki-ke Atotori – Momonosuke"); 820. "Cats and Dogs Have a History" (犬と猫に歴史あり, "Inu to Neko ni Rekishi Ari"); 821. "Understood" (承知した, "Shōchi shita"); 822. "Descending the Elephant" (下象, "Gezō"); 823. "The World Is Restless" (ざわつく世界, "Zawatsuku Sekai"); 824. "Playing Pirates" (気まぐれ, "Kimagure"); 825. "Comic Strip" (世経の絵物語, "Sekei no Emonogatari"); 826. "0 and 4" (0と4, "Zero to Yon"); 827. "Totto Land" (トットランド, "Tottorando")
Momonosuke is the rightful heir of the Kozuki clan; Kin'emon, Kanjuro, and Raizo are retainers tasked with his safety. Zou is also hiding a red-colored Poneglyph; as the mink leaders explain, there are four so-called Road Poneglyphs with coordinates that, when combined, reveal the end of the Grand Line. Two more have already been discovered, one each owned by Kaido and Big Mom. Kin'emon states that Momonosuke's real father Kozuki Oden, who sailed with Gol D. Roger to Raftel, has been executed by Kaido, forcing them to run. Luffy declares a ninja-pirate-mink-samurai alliance to take down Kaido; they divide their forces, with Kin'emon, Zoro, and Law proceeding to Wano; the Cat Viper seeking the remnants of Whitebeard's forces, Momonosuke remaining on Zou with Duke Dogstorm, and Luffy going to retrieve Sanji from Big Mom. Jack returns and begins attacking Zunesha, who is able to speak directly to Momonosuke; with permission to fight back, Zunesha makes short work of Jack's fleet. Many royal families set out for Marijoa for the Reverie, a summit meeting. On their way to Big Mom's base on Whole Cake Island, Luffy encounters several of Sanji's siblings and Sanji's betrothed.
83	Emperor of the Sea, Charlotte Linlin; Kaizoku "Yonkō" Shārotto Rinrin (海賊「四皇」シャーロット・リンリン)	November 4, 2016; 978-4-08-880801-7	August 1, 2017; 978-1-4215-9433-0
828. "1 and 2" (1と2, "Ichi to Ni"); 829. "Emperor of the Sea, Charlotte Linlin" (海賊「四皇」シャーロット・リンリン, "Kaizoku 'Yonkō' Shārotto Rinrin"); 830. "A Man You Can Bet On" (賭けられる男, "Kakerareru Otoko"); 831. "Adventure in the Mysterious Forest" (不思議な森の冒険, "Fushigi na Mori no Bōken"); 832. "Kingdom of Germa" (ジェルマ王国, "Jeruma Ōkoku"); 833. "Vinsmoke Judge" (ヴィンスモーク・ジャッジ, "Vinsumōku Jajji"); 834. "My Dream" (おれの夢, "Ore no Yume"); 835. "Kingdom of Soul" (魂の国, "Tamashii no Kuni"); 836. "Lola's Vivre Card" (ローラがくれた命の紙, "Rōra ga Kureta Biburukādo"); 837. "Luffy vs. Cracker the General" (ルフィVS将星クラッカー, "Rufi Bāsasu Shōsei Kurakkā"); 838. "ChoBro" (チョニキ, "Choniki")
Charlotte Pudding explains that Big Mom's title is literal, with 85 children and alliances strengthened through strategic marriages; she provides a map to Whole Cake Island and promises to help them retrieve Sanji. Denied croquembouche, Big Mom rampages until Jimbei arrives with the dessert and a request to leave so he can join the Straw Hats. When they arrive, Brook and the mink Pedro split from the group to find Big Mom's Road Poneglyph, while Luffy, Nami, Chopper, and Carrot become trapped in the Seducing Woods. Sanji's miserable childhood is shown in a flashback: while his sister and three brothers are strong, loyal soldiers, he is more interested in cooking. Luffy begins to fight General Cracker.
84	Luffy vs. Sanji; Rufi Bāsasu Sanji (ルフィVSサンジ)	February 3, 2017; 978-4-08-881002-7	November 7, 2017; 978-1-4215-9700-3
839. "I Owe You My Life!" (クソお世話になりました, "Kuso Osewa ni Narimashita"); 840. "The Iron Mask" (鉄仮面, "Tekkamen"); 841. "To the East Blue" ("東の海"へ, "'Īsuto Burū' e"); 842. "The Power of a Full Stomach" (満腹の力, "Manpuku no Chikara"); 843. "Vinsmoke Sanji" (ヴィンスモーク・サンジ, "Vinsumōku Sanji"); 844. "Luffy vs. Sanji" (ルフィVSサンジ, "Rufi Bāsasu Sanji"); 845. "Forces of Rage" (怒りの軍団, "Ikari no Gundan"); 846. "Tamago Security" (タマゴの警備, "Tamago no Keibi"); 847. "Luffy and Big Mom" (ルフィとビッグ・マム, "Rufi to Biggu Mamu"); 848. "Goodbye" (さよなら, "Sayonara")
The flashback continues; Vinsmoke Judge calls Sanji an embarrassing failson and imprisons him in an iron mask. The Germa mercenaries advance into the East Blue and Sanji is released by his older sister Reiju; Judge lets him go with a strict admonition to never claim his heritage. Luffy in another Four Gear: Tankman Full Version defeats Cracker with the help of his prodigious appetite and Nami learns that Big Mom's vivre card, which she received from Lola after Thriller Bark, gives her power over the Seductive Forest. They break through in time to meet the Germa carriage, but Sanji, fearing his father's threat against his adopted father Chef Zeff, beats Luffy to prove his loyalty to Judge and Nami, incensed, slaps him. Luffy vows to wait in place without eating until Sanji returns, but Big Mom has them imprisoned in her book collection. Pedro and Brook agree on a plan to capture the Poneglyph. Before the wedding, Sanji meets with Pudding and proposes marriage sincerely; Pudding visits the imprisoned Luffy and whispers a secret that shocks him.
85	Liar; Usotsuki (ウソつき)	May 2, 2017; 978-4-08-881070-6	February 6, 2018; 978-1-4215-9820-8
849. "ChoBro in the Land of Mirrors" (鏡の国のチョニキ, "Kagami no Kuni no Choniki"); 850. "A Ray of Light" (一筋の光, "Hitosuji no Hikari"); 851. "Dog-End" (シケモク, "Shikemoku"); 852. "Germa's Failure" (ジェルマの失敗作, "Jeruma no Shippaisaku"); 853. "Not Here" (ここじゃねェ, "Koko ja nē"); 854. "What Are You Doing?" (何やってんだ, "Nani Yattenda"); 855. "Glurrgle!!!" (ぐぎゅるるる!!!, "Gugyurururu!!!"); 856. "Liar" (ウソつき, "Usotsuki"); 857. "Rook" (ルーク, "Rūku"); 858. "Meeting" (会議, "Kaigi")
Carrot and Chopper, who have been trapped in the mirror world by Big Mom's daughter Brulee, escape and begin taking advantage of Brulee's powers. Sanji picks flowers and prepares a meal for Pudding, hoping to surprise her; he overhears her confessing the secret plan to murder all the Vinsmokes during tomorrow's wedding and seize the Germa technology. Pedro is defeated and Big Mom takes Brook captive. Jimbei arrives to free Luffy and Nami. Reiju tells Sanji she remembers a fight between their parents; although Sora was forced to bear the four boys, she took poison in an unsuccessful attempt to thwart Judge's plans. Although Sora remained weak and eventually died, she was delighted that Sanji alone had remained human. The secret plan begins to unravel: Brook is rescued, Big Mom's lieutenants prove reluctant to report their failures, and Sanji restores Luffy's health with the meal that was meant for Pudding; Sanji confesses that he really just wants to go back to the Straw Hats but not before save his family in danger. Luffy and Bege agree to an alliance to take down Big Mom.
86	Emperor Assassination Plan; Yonkō Ansatsu Sakusen (四皇暗殺作戦)	August 4, 2017; 978-4-08-881198-7	May 1, 2018; 978-1-9747-0042-4
859. "Emperor Assassination Plan" (四皇暗殺作戦, "Yonkō Ansatsu Sakusen"); 860. "10:00 Start" (10:00 開宴, "Jūji Kaien"); 861. "The Actor" (演技派, "Engi-ha"); 862. "The Thinker" (頭脳派, "Zunō-ha"); 863. "The Knight" (義侠派, "Gikyō-ha"); 864. "The Vinsmoke Massacre Plot" (ヴィンスモーク家皆殺し計画, "Vinsumōku-ke Minagoroshi Keikaku"); 865. "Hey, Mother" (ねぇマザー, "Nē Mazā"); 866. "Natural Born Destroyer"; 867. "Happy Birthday"; 868. "KX Launcher" (KXランチャー, "Kē Ekkusu Ranchā"); 869. "Castling" (籠城, "Rōjō")
Bege's plan to assassinate Big Mom will start with breaking a cherished picture of Mother Carmel, then finish with poison gas shells. The ceremony is held on an altar built on the immense wedding cake; as Sanji lifts the veil, Pudding exposes a third eye, hoping to stun him, but his respectful response surprises her instead. Luffy bursts out of the wedding cake, and Brook manages to smash the picture; the surprises leave Big Mom confused. Sanji rescues the rest of the Vinsmokes. Big Mom's story is told in a flashback: abandoned by her parents at the age of five, she was adopted by Mother Carmel into the House of Lambs orphanage on Elbaph. Even among the giants, Linlin's strength is surprising. The orphans feast on semla before entering a 12-day fast along with the giants; on the seventh day of the fast, Linlin loses control and destroys Elbaph during her first food rampage, forcing the orphanage into exile. For her sixth birthday, Mother Carmel prepares a huge croquembouche, but sells Linlin to the World Government. Before they arrive, Linlin decides to create a utopia where no one is abandoned. Bege's plan fails and the Straw Hats retreat into his castle, the Big Father.
87	Bittersweet; Amaku nai (甘くない)	November 2, 2017; 978-4-08-881225-0	August 7, 2018; 978-1-9747-0141-4
870. "Parting" (訣別, "Ketsubetsu"); 871. "You Can Do It, Caesar!!" (がんばれシーザー!!, "Ganbare Shīzā!!"); 872. "Thick and Fluffy" (とろふわ, "Torofuwa"); 873. "Recipe for Disaster" (八方塞菓子, "Happō Fusa-gashi"); 874. "Be My Servant" (私のしもべになりなさい, "Watashi no Shimobe ni Narinasai"); 875. "A Woman's Honor" (女の仁義, "Onna no Jingi"); 876. "Pudding Coincidentally Appears!!" (プリン、偶然現る!!, "Purin, Gūzen Arawaru!!"); 877. "Bittersweet" (甘くない, "Amaku nai"); 878. "Commander Pedro of the Mink Guardians" (ミンク族 侠客団 団長ペドロ, "Minku-zoku Gādianzu Danchō Pedoro"); 879. "Big Mom's Sweet 3 General, Katakuri" (ビッグ・マム「スイート3将星」カタクリ, "Biggu Mamu 'Suīto San Shōsei' Katakuri")
The Big Father proves no match for Big Mom's forces, and Germa 66 tumbles out to facilitate Bege's escape. The fight causes part of the chateau to fracture and fall, threatening the entire city, but Streusen converts the building to cake. Denied wedding cake, Big Mom flies into a food rampage; she pursues the Straw Hats while Bege's Firetank Pirates assist Pudding, Chiffon, and Sanji's escape to bake a replacement cake. Luffy duels Big Mom's son Katakuri, who has Mochi-Mochi Fruit powers similar to Luffy's Gum-Gum Fruit, and the mink Pedro sacrifices his life to free the Sunny.
88	Lion; Shishi (獅子)	March 2, 2018; 978-4-08-881362-2	November 6, 2018; 978-1-9747-0378-4
880. "Zero Escape" (退路0, "Tairo Zero"); 881. "Wave Room" (波の部屋, "Nami no Heya"); 882. "Beyond the Emperor's Expectations" (四皇の想定外, "Yonkō no Sōteigai"); 883. "Merienda" (おやつの時間, "Merienda"); 884. "Who Is That?" (誰だ, "Dare da"); 885. "I'm Brulee!!!" (ブリュレだよっ!!!, "Buryure da yo!!!"); 886. "Way of Life" (生き様でちゅよ, "Ikizama dechu yo"); 887. "Someone Somewhere Is Wishing for Your Happiness" (どこかで誰かが君の幸せを願ってる, "Dokoka de Dareka ga Kimi no Shiawase o Negatteru"); 888. "Lion" (獅子, "Shishi"); 889. "Unfamiliar Mama" (未知のママ, "Michi no Mama")
Pudding and Chiffon arrive at Chocolat Town on Cacao Island with a concealed Sanji to start baking the replacement wedding cake. Big Mom catches up to the Sunny and nearly capsizes it with a tsunami, but Jimbei skillfully guides the ship by tube riding. The victorious Vinsmokes falsely report that Germa 66 have been defeated and leave Whole Cake Island in pursuit of Big Mom. With Luffy incapacitated, Katakuri retires for an afternoon snack; the myth of Katakuri's invincibility begins to unravel. The team finishes the replacement cake; a taste test proves Sanji's prowess at capturing the essence of sweetness. The cake is loaded on Bege's ship, the Nostra Castello, and starts backtracking to Big Mom. With the full moon, Carrot becomes sulong, a moon lion, wreaking havoc in the pursuing fleet.
89	Bad End Musical; BADEND MUSICAL	June 4, 2018; 978-4-08-881496-4	February 5, 2019; 978-1-9747-0521-4
890. "Big Mom on the Ship" (船の上のビッグ・マム, "Fune no Ue no Biggu Mamu"); 891. "They Believe in Me" (信じられてる, "Shinjirareteru"); 892. "Threat Confirmed" (強敵認定, "Kyōteki Nintei"); 893. "Flampe, 36th Daughter of Charlotte" (C家36女フランペ, "Shārotto-ke Sanjūroku-jo Furanpe"); 894. "12:05" (0時5分, "Reiji Gofun"); 895. "Luffy the Pirate vs. General Katakuri" (海賊ルフィVS将星カタクリ, "Kaizoku Rufi Bāsasu Shōsei Katakuri"); 896. "One Last Thing" (最後のお願い, "Saigo no Onegai"); 897. "Pekoms's Cacao Island Escape Plan" (ペコムズのカカオ島脱出作戦, "Pekomuzu no Kakao-tō Dasshutsu Sakusen"); 898. "I Will Return" (必ず戻る, "Kanarazu Modoru"); 899. "The Final Fortress" (最後の砦, "Saigo no Toride"); 900. "Bad End Musical" (BADEND MUSICAL)
Big Mom catches the Sunny and begins looking for the promised cake; Jimbei and Brook work together and manage to drive her away. The Nostra Castello finally catches up with Big Mom while bearing the cake, which Pudding, Chiffon, and Sanji decorated enroute; they speed off to draw her away from the Sunny. Luffy's long battle with Katakuri concludes by defeating Katakuri with another Gear Four: Snakeman. Germa arrive and begin fighting Big Mom's fleet; Sanji rescues an exhausted Luffy from a trap laid on Cacao Island. As they prepare to escape, the Sunny is caught, but Big Mom's forces are repelled by the Sun Pirates, who have come to see Jimbei off and wish him well. Big Mom, who had lost weight during the pursuit, starts eating the cake greedily and finally is sated; she sings a tribute to the flavor as her fleet begins to close in on the Straw Hats again.
90	Sacred Marijoa; Seichi Marījoa (聖地マリージョア)	September 4, 2018; 978-4-08-881562-6	May 7, 2019; 978-1-9747-0700-3
901. "Don't Let Even Death Stop You!!!" (死んでも死ぬなよ!!!, "Shindemo Shinu na yo!!!"); 902. "End Roll"; 903. "Fifth Emperor" (5番目の皇帝, "Gobanme no Kōtei"); 904. "Introducing the Revolutionary Army Captains" (革命軍全軍隊長登場, "Kakumeigun Zengun Taichō Tōjō"); 905. "What a Beautiful World" (美しい世界, "Utsukushii Sekai"); 906. "Sacred Marijoa" (聖地マリージョア, "Seichi Marījoa"); 907. "The Empty Throne" (虚の玉座, "Kara no Gyokuza"); 908. "The Reverie Begins" (世界会議開幕, "Reverī Kaimaku"); 909. "Seppuku" (切腹); 910. "Onward to Wano" (いざワノ国へ, "Iza Wano Kuni e")
Wadatsumi, the immense sea monk, takes the Sunny into his mouth to sneak away; ultimately, Jimbei elects to help his Sun Pirates delay Big Mom so the Straw Hats can make their escape. Enroute to Wano, a new set of bounty posters is delivered; Luffy is dismayed to find his bounty decreased, but Brook points out that he missed a zero -- instead, it has tripled to 1.5 billion Berries. As the heads of state are headed to the Reverie, the Navy is providing security; Koby is now a captain. The captains of the Revolutionary Army arrive to free Bartholomew Kuma, fighting with Admirals Ryokugyu and Fujitora. The delegation from Fish-man Island arrive, including King Neptune and Princess Shirahoshi. King Stelly of Goa is asked to swear an oath to the World Government before the Empty Throne, left vacant as a symbol that all countries are equal. An ominous threat is made at the Reverie. In Wano, Franky (Franosuke), Usopp (Usohachi), Nico Robin (Orobi), and Zoro (Zolojuro) have assumed local identities to avoid drawing attention as the rest of the Straw Hats arrive.
91	Adventure in the Land of Samurai; Samurai no Kuni no Bōken (侍の国の冒険)	December 4, 2018; 978-4-08-881644-9	August 6, 2019; 978-1-9747-0701-0
911. "Adventure in the Land of Samurai" (侍の国の冒険, "Samurai no Kuni no Bōken"); 912. "Amigasa Village" (編笠村, "Amigasa-mura"); 913. "The Crane Returns the Favor" (鶴の恩返し, "Tsuru no Ongaeshi"); 914. "Okobore Town" (おこぼれ町, "Okobore-chō"); 915. "Bakura Town" (博羅町, "Bakura-chō"); 916. "Wano Sumo" (ワノ国大相撲, "Wano Kuni Ōzumō"); 917. "Food Treasure Barge" (食糧宝船, "Shokuryō Takarabune"); 918. "Luffytaro Returns the Favor" (ルフィ太郎の恩返し, "Rufitarō no Ongaeshi"); 919. "The Ruins of Oden Castle" (おでん城跡, "Oden-jō Ato"); 920. "For Love of Oden" (おでんが好き, "Oden ga Suki"); 921. "Shutenmaru" (酒天丸)
After arriving in Wano, Luffy is separated and rescues Otama. She charms beasts by pinching off millet dumplings from her cheeks. Desperate conditions under Kaido and Shogun Orochi have left little food and clean water in Wano. Otama is weak from drinking contaminated water and Luffy takes her to find help; along the way, they meet Zoro, who has just saved Otsuru from bandits. Otsuru invites them to her teahouse in Okobore Town, where she treats both Zoro and Otama. Otsuru and her waitress Okiku feed oshiruko to Otama for her birthday. As they rest, Orochi's men abduct Otama. Pursuing Otama, Luffy defeats the yokozuna Urashima and draws out Holdem, the town's pirate boss. Luffy surprises Holdem by snatching Otama and stealing a shipment of food, returning to demolish Holdem after learning how he mistreated her. The food is delivered to grateful residents of Okobore. Luffy, Zoro, Law, and Okiku travel to Oden Castle, where they are reunited with the rest of the Straw Hats and Kin'emon, Kanjuro, and Raizo. The Wano natives explain they have been sent 20 years forward in time after the death of Lord Oden, and have started planning an attack on Kaido's base on Onigashima.
92	Introducing Komurasaki the Oiran; Oiran Komurasaki Tōjō (花魁小紫登場)	March 4, 2019; 978-4-08-881758-3	November 5, 2019; 978-1-9747-1015-7
922. "Supreme Commander Kaido of the Animal Kingdom Pirates" (百獣海賊団総督 カイドウ, "Hyakujū Kaizokudan Sōtoku – Kaidō"); 923. "Emperor of the Sea Kaido vs. Luffy" (四皇カイドウVSルフィ, "Yonkō Kaidō Bāsasu Rufi"); 924. "Huh" (は, "Ha"); 925. "Absence" (ブランク, "Buranku"); 926. "Excavation Labor Camp" (囚人採掘場, "Shūjin Saikutsujō"); 927. "Otoko the Kamuro" (禿のおトコ, "Kamuro no Otoko"); 928. "Introducing Komurasaki the Oiran" (花魁小紫登場, "Oiran Komurasaki Tōjō"); 929. "Shogun of Wano, Kurozumi Orochi" (ワノ国将軍 黒炭オロチ, "Wano Kuni Shōgun – Kurozumi Orochi"); 930. "Ebisu Town" (えびす町, "Ebisu-chō"); 931. "Soba Mask" (おそばマスク, "Osoba Masuku")
Jack the Drought and Kaido repossess the food from Okobore Town. Luffy spars with Kaido but is defeated with a single blow, then imprisoned at a labor camp in the Udon region with Eustass Kid. Luffy and Kid compete at the camp, earning an incredible amount of food as reward as well as vice warden Dobon's ire; when Dobon challenges them, they easily defeat him. Luffy befriends Hyo, an elderly prisoner, and gives him food tickets. At Mihawk's castle, Perona learns that Moria is still alive. Nami (as Onami) is training with kunoichi Shinobu. Franky works for Minatomo, who designed Kaido's mansion; he loses his temper when he learns Minatomo no longer has the plans. Zoro is befriended by the beggar Tonoyasu, who takes him to his home in Ebisu, where the residents are oddly cheerful despite their dire situation. Sanji (as Sangoro) runs a wildly successful noodle cart, but runs afoul of a protection racket run by the Kyoshiro family, a yakuza clan allied with Orochi. Sanji, Usopp, and Robin meet Otoko, a cheerful young girl who is part of Komurasaki the Oiran's retinue; Komurasaki is renowned for both her beauty and cruelty. Sanji is confronted by the Tobi Roppo and dons a Germa 66 battle suit to fight them without disclosing his identity. Robin, called with Komurasaki and other geishas to entertain Shogun Orochi, steals away from the party to search for the Poneglyph but is caught. Big Mom arrives in Wano, but her ship is capsized by Kaido's forces; she is found, suffering amnesia, on a beach by Otama, Momonosuke, Okiku, and Chopper.
93	The Star of Ebisu; Ebisu-chō no Ninkimono (えびす町の人気者)	July 4, 2019; 978-4-08-881877-1	April 7, 2020; 978-1-9747-1255-7
932. "Shogun and Oiran" (将軍と花魁, "Shōgun to Oiran"); 933. "A Warrior's Mercy" (武士の情け, "Bushi no Nasake"); 934. "Hyogoro the Flower" (花のヒョウ五郎, "Hana no Hyōgorō"); 935. "Queen"; 936. "Sumo Inferno" (大相撲インフェルノ, "Ōzumō Inferuno"); 937. "Gyukimaru on Bandit's Bridge" (おいはぎ橋の牛鬼丸, "Oihagi-bashi no Gyūkimaru"); 938. "A Woman's Secret" (女の秘密, "Onna no Himitsu"); 939. "The Old Leopard Never Forgets the Way" (老いたる豹は路を忘れず, "Oitaru Hyō wa Michi o Wasurezu"); 940. "Sparks of Rebellion" (反逆の火種, "Hangyaku no Hidane"); 941. "The Star of Ebisu" (えびす町の人気者, "Ebisu-chō no Ninkimono"); 942. "Daimyo of Hakumai, Shimotsuki Yasuie" ("白舞大名"霜月康イエ, "'Hakumai Daimyō' Shimotsuki Yasuie")
Confronted by Orochi's lieutenant Fukurokuji, Robin claims to be Ushimitsu Kozo, a mysterious Robin Hood figure that has been plaguing the Shogun; she manages to escape and returns to Orochi's party. Orochi tells his guests the long-dead Kozuki Oden will soon exact revenge. Although most find it far-fetched, they politely suppress laughter, but Otoko cannot. Incensed, Orochi tries to kill her but Komurasaki intervenes and Robin spirits Otoko away with Brook's help. Yakuza oyabun Kyoshiro slashes and apparently kills Komurasaki. Big Mom journeys toward the labor camp, convinced they will have oshiruko. Old Hyo is the notorious gangster Hyogoro the Flower; Queen, one of the lead performers of Kaido's Animal Kingdom Pirates, arrives to suppress a small riot caused by Luffy. Luffy and Hyo are forced to fight against others in a sumo match, fitted with collars that will decapitate them if they leave the ring. Luffy uses the matches to train his use of haki under the tutelage of Hyo. At a mixed bath, Nami, Robin, and Shinobu are subjected to a surprise inspection by Hawkins and Drake, who are looking for people with ankle tattoos of a crescent moon; they escape with the help of Nami's Happiness Punch. Zoro is confronted by Gyukimaru, who seeks to return the treasured blade Shusui to Ryuma's grave. Komurasaki and Otoko arrive, pursued by Hitokiri Kamazo, who is defeated by Zoro; Komurasaki is revealed as Hiyori, the younger sister of Momonosuke. As Orochi is about to uncover the secret invasion plan, Tonoyasu confesses to being the daimyo Yasu the Hedgehog, acting as Ushimitsu Kozo, and claiming credit for the cryptic messages that have been circulating. Yasu has the last laugh as he mocks Orochi during his public execution; his daughter, Otoko, cannot stop laughing and crying.
94	A Soldier's Dream; Tsuwamono-domo ga Yume (兵どもが夢)	October 4, 2019; 978-4-08-882054-5	August 4, 2020; 978-1-9747-1537-4
943. "Smile"; 944. "Partner" (相棒, "Aibō"); 945. "Olin" (おリン, "Orin"); 946. "Queen vs. Olin" (クイーンVSおリン, "Kuīn Bāsasu Orin"); 947. "Queen's Gamble" (クイーンの賭け, "Kuīn no Kake"); 948. "Introducing Kawamatsu the Kappa" ("河童の河松"登場, "'Kappa no Kawamatsu' Tōjō"); 949. "Mummy" (ミイラ, "Miira"); 950. "A Soldier's Dream" (兵どもが夢, "Tsuwamono-domo ga Yume"); 951. "Rampage"; 952. "Hiyori and Kawamatsu" (日和と河松, "Hiyori to Kawamatsu"); 953. "Once a Fox" (一度狐, "Ichido Gitsune")
The secret of Ebisu's cheerfulness is revealed: the citizens ate defective Smile fruits, which leave them only laughter to express any emotion; a distraught Otoko laughs as she watches her father die. Zoro attacks Orochi, but the shogun is saved by Kyoshiro; Franky, Brook, and Law join the fight against Drake and Hawkins. Kid is returned to the labor camp along with Killer (Hitokiri Kamazo). Big Mom arrives, smelling the oshiruko, but denied the treat, flies into a food rage and takes down Queen; as Luffy confesses to eating it all, Big Mom turns her attention to him. After Big Mom rampages through the town, Queen awakens and headbutts Big Mom, causing her to regain her memories, then lose consciousness; she is captured and shackled with Sea Prism stone. One of the cells breaks open during the fight, freeing the last of the Akazaya Nine, the kappa Kawamatsu. With his help, the warden is defeated, liberating the labor camp prisoners. Kaido and Big Mom clash; simultaneously, preparations for the invasion of Onigashima come together: an army, a fleet, and weapons are all identified.
95	Oden's Adventure; Oden no Bōken (おでんの冒険)	December 28, 2019; 978-4-08-882169-6	December 1, 2020; 978-1-9747-1813-9
954. "Like a Dragon Given Wings" (龍に翼を得たる如し, "Ryū ni Tsubasa o Etaru Gotoshi"); 955. "Enma" (閻魔); 956. "Big News" (ビッグニュース, "Biggu Nyūsu"); 957. "Ultimate"; 958. "The Promised Port" (約束の港, "Yakusoku no Minato"); 959. "Samurai" (侍); 960. "Introducing Kozuki Oden" (光月おでん登場, "Kōzuki Oden Tōjō"); 961. "The Mountain God Incident" (山の神事件, "Yama no Kami Jiken"); 962. "Daimyo and Vassals" (大名と家臣, "Daimyō to Kashin"); 963. "Becoming Samurai" (侍になる, "Samurai ni Naru"); 964. "Oden's Adventure" (おでんの冒険, "Oden no Bōken")
Zoro reluctantly promises to return Shusui in return for Enma, one of the legendary swords carried by Lord Oden. Law escapes from Hawkins. The duel between Big Mom and Kaido ends in a stalemate and alliance. Drake, who has secretly been working for the Navy's special force "Sword", calls Koby to report the Emperors' pact. At the Reverie, the World Economic Journal runs a shocking story about Sabo and the World Government decides to dissolve the Seven Warlords. Ex-Fleet Admiral Sengoku briefly recounts the story of the Rocks Pirates, who had Whiteboard, Big Mom, and Kaido on the discordant crew, but were defeated by Vice Admiral Garp, working with Gold Roger 40 years ago. On the same day the Fire Festival starts, the invasion of Onigashima is halted as neither ships nor men have arrived at Tokage Port; tipped by a mole, Orochi had bombed the bridges connecting routes to the port. The scene shifts to 41 years ago, when Kazuki Oden was 18, a failed sailor and rebellious son to his father Sukiyaki, Shogun of Wano. He is banished from the Flower Capital after saving the city from a giant boar and travels around the country, gaining admiration and followers, finally defeating the ogre Ashura Doji in Kuri. The shogun, impressed, makes him the daimyo of Kuri and he makes the odd gang of roughnecks following him his samurai, including the young trio of Kawamatsu, a fish-man, and the minks Dogstorm and Cat Viper. Shortly afterward, Whitebeard makes it to Wano and Oden spars with him, asking to sail together. Whitebeard attempts to sail away, but Oden grabs the anchor chain and Whitebeard proposes that if he can cling to the chain for three days, he may join them. With a few minutes left, he drops the chain to rescue Amatsuki Toki from slavers and Whitebeard, impressed, adds him to the crew; Oden's exploits draw the attention of Gold Roger.
96	I Am Oden, and I Was Born to Boil; Niete Nanbo no Oden ni Sōrō (煮えてなんぼのおでんに候)	April 3, 2020; 978-4-08-882252-5	April 6, 2021; 978-1-9747-1999-0
965. "The Kurozumi Clan's Plot" (黒炭家の陰謀, "Kurozumi-ke no Inbō"); 966. "Roger and Whitebeard" (ロジャーと白ひげ, "Rojā to Shirohige"); 967. "Roger's Adventure" (ロジャーの冒険, "Rojā no Bōken"); 968. "Oden's Return" (おでんの帰還, "Oden no Kikan"); 969. "Fool of a Lord" (バカ殿, "Baka-tono"); 970. "Oden vs. Kaido" (おでんvsカイドウ, "Oden Bāsasu Kaidō"); 971. "Sentenced to Boil" (釜茹での刑, "Kamayude no Kei"); 972. "I Am Oden, and I Was Born to Boil" (煮えてなんぼのおでんに候, "Niete Nanbo no Oden ni Sōrō"); 973. "The Kozuki Clan" (光月の一族, "Kōzuki no Ichizoku"); 974. "Onward to Onigashima!!" (いざ、鬼ヶ島!!, "Iza, Onigashima!!")
While sailing with Whitebeard, Oden and Toki welcome a son, Momonosuke. Ailing shogun Sukiyaki surprisingly appoints Orochi as regent in Oden's absence. Orochi leads the disgraced Kurozumi clan; as the prior shogun had no heir until Sukiyaki was born, Orochi's grandfather, a daimyo and potential successor, poisoned his rivals, then committed seppuku after being caught, and the Kurozumis have hated Sukiyaki for being born. Orochi amassed wealth and power by stealing money from both Yasu and Oden; with the help of a close advisor who ate the clone-clone fruit, Orochi is recommended to Sukiyaki as Oden's brother. Four years into Oden's voyage, Whitebeard and Roger clash, then celebrate; after Roger learns that Oden can read the Poneglyphs, he explains how they locate the final island in the Grand Line, and asks Whitebeard to loan Oden for a year. Roger's crew is suspicious initially, but accept Oden after he prepares oden. When they reach the final island and its treasure, left by the mysterious figure Joyboy, Roger laughs and they name the island "Laugh Tale". After Oden returns to Wano, Orochi makes a promise and threat so dire that within hours, Oden is seen dancing in the street for coins, wearing nothing but a loincloth; his humiliation continues weekly for five years until Orochi reneges on his promise and Oden wages war with the help of the Akazaya Nine. As Oden is about to defeat Kaido, he is distracted by the clone-clone user impersonating Momonosuke, and is caught and sentenced to death by boiling in oil alongside the Nine. Oden strikes a deal with Kaido: they will boil in the pot together, but if any survive for an hour, they are free to leave. Oden enters the pot, then shoulders a plank to hold the rest of the Nine out of the oil. As he suffers, Shinobu reveals that Orochi promised to release hostages each time Oden danced, and to leave Wano entirely after five years. Oden survives the boiling and makes one last wish, to open Wano's borders, before being shot and killed by Kaido, as the Nine flee. Toki sends Momonosuke with Kin'emon, Kanjuro, and Raizo 20 years into the future; Denjiro's face is warped by anger and he assumes the role of oyabun Kyoshiro, hiding as Orochi's retainer while secretly acting as Ushimitsu Kozo and plotting with Hiyori. Kanjuro confesses to being Orochi's mole and abducts Momonosuke.
97	My Bible; Boku no Baiburu (僕の聖書)	September 16, 2020; 978-4-08-882347-8	August 17, 2021; 978-1-9747-2289-1
975. "Kin'emon's Clever Trick" (錦えもんの一計, "Kin'emon no Ikkei"); 976. "Begging Your Pardon!!!" (お控えなすって!!!, "Ohikēnasutte!!!"); 977. "The Party's Off!!!" (宴はやめだ!!!, "Utage wa Yame da!!!"); 978. "Introducing the Tobi Roppo" (飛び六胞登場, "Tobi Roppō Tōjō"); 979. "Family Problem" (家族問題, "Kazoku Mondai"); 980. "Fighting Music" (戦う音楽, "Tatakau Myūjikku"); 981. "Joining the Fight" (参戦, "Sansen"); 982. "Scoundrel Meets Scoundrel" (無礼者 meets 無礼者, "Bureimono Mītsu Bureimono"); 983. "Thunder" (雷鳴, "Raimei"); 984. "My Bible" (僕の聖書, "Boku no Baiburu")
Luffy, Law, and Kid arrive at Tokage Port and fight the Animal Kingdom pirates; Kyoshiro/Denjiro publicly defects to the Kozuki side, bringing 1,200 men. Denjiro reveals the bulk of the forces are safe at Habu, overestimating Kin'emon had misled Kanjuro. As the Animal Kingdom battleships flee back to Onigashima, their long-range cannons sink several Kozuki ships until Jimbei arrives. Kin'emon lays out the attack plan and again Denjiro overestimates it as a simple deception for Kanjuro; the amended plan is to have three groups assault the fortress from the front and sides as a distraction while the Akazaya Nine sneak around the back with Law. During the celebration on Onigashima, the Animal Kingdom pirates that were captains of their own crews gather as the Tobi Roppo: siblings Ulti and Page One, Who's-Who, Black Maria, X. Drake, and Sasaki. Kaido announces the one who returns his son Yamato may challenge one of the three Lead Performers (King, Queen, or Jack) for a chance at promotion. Luffy watches them waste oshiruko and incensed, forgets the plan and begins attacking the Animal Kingdom pirates. The Big Mom pirates succeed in climbing the falls again, but this time, they are knocked back by Marco the Phoenix. Kanjuro arrives with Momonosuke and Orochi decides to crucify the Kozuki heir. Sasaki is detained by Denjiro, Big Mom begins chasing Nami and Chopper, and Luffy confronts Ulti and Page One; Yamato arrives and defeats Ulti. Yamato has chosen to follow Kazuki Oden's example and defects to help Luffy. Okiku is reunited with her brother Izo, who had joined Whitebeard with Oden.
98	Vassals of Glory; Chūshin Nishiki (忠臣錦)	February 4, 2021; 978-4-08-882423-9	December 7, 2021; 978-1-9747-2519-9
985. "New Onigashima Project" (新鬼ヶ島計画, "Shin Onigashima Keikaku"); 986. "My Name" (拙者の名前, "Sessha no Namae"); 987. "Vassals of Glory" (忠臣錦, "Chūshin Nishiki"); 988. "Sorry for the Wait" (待たせたな, "Mataseta na"); 989. "I Can't Imagine Losing" (負ける気がしねえ, "Makeru Ki ga Shinē"); 990. "Army of One" (孤軍, "Kogun"); 991. "Let Us Die!!!" (死なせてくれ!!!, "Shinasetekure!!!"); 992. "Remnants" (残党, "Zantō"); 993. "The Dream of Wano" (ワノ国の夢, "Wano Kuni no Yume"); 994. "My Other Name Is Yamato" (またの名はヤマト, "Mata no Na wa Yamato")
Kaido and Big Mom announce an alliance, seeking the One Piece and the ancient weapons; Wano will become a pirate empire named New Onigashima. When Orochi protests, Kaido beheads him; Fukurokuju and Hotei, who lead forces of 5,000 ninja and samurai, respectively, pledge allegiance to Kaido. As Momonosuke and the Akazaya Nine declare their defiance, Luffy attacks Kaido, who ascends to the roof. Shinobu frees Momonosuke and Sanji begins to spirit him away using the Germa 66 suit. Big Mom attacks Luffy, but is intercepted by Franky, Jimbei, and Nico Robin. As Luffy tries to get to the roof to continue fighting Kaido, Queen engages him. As King rallies the Tobi Roppo, Drake is exposed as a Navy mole and asks to join Luffy. The minks defeat Jack, and the Akazaya Nine begin fighting Kaido, but he overwhelms them. Queen unleashes an indiscriminate ice oni plague, afflicting his friends and foes alike; he tosses the antidote to Apoo. Yamato defends Momonosuke and Shinobu.
99	Straw Hat Luffy; Mugiwara no Rufi (麦わらのルフィ)	June 4, 2021; 978-4-08-882691-2	May 3, 2022; 978-1-9747-2900-5
995. "A Kunoichi's Oath" (くの一の誓い, "Kunoichi no Chikai"); 996. "Island of the Strongest" (最強がいる島, "Saikyō ga Iru Shima"); 997. "Flame Clouds" (焔雲, "Homura-gumo"); 998. "Ancient Types" (古代種, "Kodaishu"); 999. "The Sake I Brewed to Drink With You" (君がため醸みし待酒, "Kimi ga Tame Kamishi Machizake"); 1000. "Straw Hat Luffy" (麦わらのルフィ, "Mugiwara no Rufi"); 1001. "Battle of Monsters on Onigashima" (鬼ヶ島怪物決戦, "Onigashima Kaibutsu Kessen"); 1002. "Four Emperors vs. New Generation" (四皇VS新世代, "Yonkō Bāsasu Shinsedai"); 1003. "Night on the Board" (盤上の夜, "Banjō no Yoru"); 1004. "Millet Dumplings" (きびだんご, "Kibi Dango")
Big Mom struggles with Marco and her son Perospero is about to strike when Carrot and Wanda, turning sulong, attack him in revenge for Pedro. Drake and Zoro defeat Apoo and toss the antidote to Chopper. Usopp and Nami are knocked back by Ulti, then rescued by Otama and Komachiyo, the enormous foo dog. Haccha, a member of the gigantic Numbers, inadvertently helps Shinobu, Yamato, and Momonosuke escape Sasaki. Kaido uses his dragon powers to lift Onigashima from the sea, intending to drop it on the Flower Capital and crush the Kozuki castle. The Straw Hats engage the Tobi Roppo: Sanji is trapped by Black Maria, Franky fights Sasaki, and Jimbei confronts Who's-Who. Marco is detained by King and Queen while carrying Zoro. Yamato returns Oden's journal to Momonosuke. Finally, Kid, Killer, Law, Luffy, and Zoro arrive at the roof to challenge Big Mom and Kaido; Law sends the Akazaya Nine away to recover. Cipher Pol "Aigis" Zero (CP0) soberly assesses the battle, noting the Kaido-Big Mom alliance has 27,000, while the Kozuki loyalists only have 5,000. However, after Otama fed millet dumplings to the smile fruit gifters, many switch sides.
100	Color of the Supreme King; Haōshoku (覇王色)	September 3, 2021; 978-4-08-882780-3	August 2, 2022; 978-1-9747-3217-3
1005. "Demon Child" (悪魔の子, "Akuma no Ko"); 1006. "The Honorable Hyogoro the Flower" (侠客"花のヒョウ五郎", "Kyōkaku 'Hana no Hyōgorō'"); 1007. "Mr. Raccoon Dog" (たぬきさん, "Tanuki-san"); 1008. "Leader of the Atamayama Thieves Brigade, Ashura Doji" (頭山盗賊団棟梁アシュラ童子, "Atama-yama Tōzokudan Tōryō Ashura Dōji"); 1009. "Naraku" (奈落); 1010. "Color of the Supreme King" (覇王色, "Haōshoku"); 1011. "The Code of Sweet Beans" (あんこの仁義, "Anko no Jingi"); 1012. "Itch" (うず, "Uzu"); 1013. "Anarchy in the B.M. (Big Mom)" (Anarchy In The BM, "Anākī In Za Biggu Mamu"); 1014. "The Ham" (人生の大根役者, "Jinsei no Daikon Yakusha"); 1015. "Chains" (縁, "Kusari")
Black Maria forces Sanji to call Nico Robin for help as a trap; he readily agrees, surprising Maria, and Robin arrives with Brook. Yamato, Momonosuke, and Shinobu are spotted and flee. Marco holds King and Queen back while using his flames to slow the progress of the ice oni virus; Hyogoro begs the other yakuza leaders to end his life before he succumbs. Chopper creates an antidote mist, saving friend and foe alike, and reminds Queen he is not a tanuki. On the roof, Zoro deflects a massive combined attack; Law and Kid manage to push Big Mom off the island, but she is saved from drowning, and Kaido fends off Zoro, Law, and Luffy. As they fight, Luffy learns to better wield his Haki, but is knocked unconscious again. Big Mom returns, sending Kid, Killer, and Law down several floors, where Killer tarries to fight Hawkins. She then pauses to speak with Otama, who says Okobore Town was destroyed by Kaido's followers, leading Big Mom to defeat Ulti and Page One in retaliation. Kid arrives and strikes Big Mom down again. Oden returns to the Akazaya Nine as Kanjuro's illusion and Ashura Doji dies saving the others. Orochi survived the beheading as a Yamata no Orochi zoan-type devil fruit user, but the nine samurai make short work of him. Okiku (Kikunojo) attacks Kanjuro, but pauses after he cloaks himself as Oden again, and Kin'emon strikes him down. Kaido announces that Luffy has lost, sinking in the ocean, and the tide begins to turn against the samurai, but Momonosuke relays a message from Luffy, vowing victory; the Heart Pirates save Luffy from drowning and starvation.

== Lists of main series chapters ==
- List of One Piece chapters 1 to 186
- List of One Piece chapters 187 to 388
- List of One Piece chapters 389 to 594
- List of One Piece chapters 595 to 806
- List of One Piece chapters 1016 to now

== See also ==
- List of One Piece media
