= List of One Piece chapters (595–806) =

Sixty-first volume of One Piece, released in Japan by Shueisha on February 4, 2011

One Piece is a Japanese manga series written and illustrated by Eiichiro Oda which has been translated into various languages and spawned a substantial media franchise, including animated and live action television series, films, video games, and associated music and merchandise. It follows the adventures of the teenaged boy and pirate captain Monkey D. Luffy, whose body gained the properties of rubber after he accidentally ate a supernatural fruit, as he travels the oceans in search of the series' titular treasure and organizes a diverse crew, named the Straw Hats.

In Japan, the series is published by Shueisha. Individual chapters have been published regularly in the shōnen manga anthology Weekly Shōnen Jump since July 22, 1997 and tankōbon format volumes (each collecting 10 to 12 chapters) have been published since December 24, 1997. The series spans over 1175 chapters and, as of March 2026, has 114 tankōbon volumes, making One Piece the 20th longest manga series by volume count.

The series has been translated and released in multiple countries. English localization began in North America, where Viz Media currently serializes One Piece in the Shonen Jump digital vault simultaneously with Japan. It originally published its English language adaptation of the series in the now-defunct monthly print anthology Shonen Jump starting with the magazine's launch in November 2002. It also publishes tankōbon format books since June 2003, which have been collected into omnibus editions incorporating three tankōbon each since December 2009; chapters and books also are published digitally through its website. In the United Kingdom, the tankōbon were published by Gollancz Manga, starting March 2006, until Viz Media took over after the fourteenth volume. In Australia and New Zealand, the English volumes have been distributed by Madman Entertainment since November 10, 2008. By October 6, 2009, only 22 volumes had been released in English. However, as announced in July 2009, Viz Media increased that number to 53 by June 2010, using an accelerated publishing schedule of five volumes per month during the first half of 2010. As of November 2025, 110 volumes of the English version have been officially released by Viz Media.

== Volumes ==
| No. | Title | Original release date | English release date |
|---|---|---|---|
| 61 | Romance Dawn for the New World | February 4, 2011; 978-4-08-870175-2 | March 6, 2012; 1-4215-4144-0 |
595. "The Pledge" (宣誓, "Sensei"); 596. "Spectrum"; 597. "~~3D~~2Y"; 598. "Two Years Later" (2年後, "Ninengo"); 599. "Nine Pirates" (九人の海賊, "Kyūnin no Kaizoku"); 600. "Island of New Beginnings" (再出発の島, "Saishuppatsu no Shima"); 601. "Romance Dawn for the New World" (ROMANCE DAWN for the new world —新しい世界への冒険の夜明け—, "Romance Dawn: For the New World: Atarashii Sekai e no Bōken no Yoake"); 602. "Downward Ho!" (下舵いっぱい!!, "Shimo Kaji Ippai!!"); 603. "Keep That in Mind" (心に留めておけ, "Kokoro ni Tometeoke")
Before being separated, the Straw Hat Pirates had planned to meet up after three days. Captain Monkey D. Luffy's message amends that to two years. Although they wish to reunite with Luffy and comfort him about his brother Portgas D. Ace's death, they instead take advantage of the opportune locales that Bartholomew Kuma sent them all to improve their skills. Luffy himself trains with Silvers Rayleigh to learn the Haki's three abilitys. Two years later, the Straw Hats gather on the archipelago where they were last together. A similar Marine force that caused them difficulties years ago tries to detain them, but because of their growth they easily flee. Together again, they resume their adventure by setting sail for Fishman Island, an underwater island.
| 62 | Adventure on Fish-Man Island; Gyojintō no Bōken (魚人島の冒険) | May 2, 2011; 978-4-08-870217-9 | May 1, 2012; 978-1-4215-4196-9 |
604. "To the Deep Sea" (深層へ, "Shinsō e"); 605. "The Kraken and the Pirates" (クラーケンと海賊, "Kurāken to Kaizoku"); 606. "Deep Sea Adventure" (深海の冒険, "Shinkai no Bōken"); 607. "30,000 Feet Under the Sea" (海底1万m, "Kaitei Ichiman Mētoru"); 608. "Underwater Paradise" (海底の楽園, "Kaitei no Rakuen"); 609. "Adventure on Fish-Man Island" (魚人島の冒険, "Gyojintō no Bōken"); 610. "Madam Sharley, Fortune-Teller" (占い師マダム・シャーリー, "Uranaishi Madamu Shārī"); 611. "Hody Jones" (ホーディ・ジョーンズ, "Hōdi Jōnzu"); 612. "Taken by the Shark They Saved" (助けたサメに連れられて, "Tasuketa Same ni Tsurerarete"); 613. "Mermaid Princess of Shell Tower" (硬殻塔の人魚姫, "Kōkaku Tō no Ningyo Hime"); 614. "Too Late Now" (やっちまったモンはしょうがねェ, "Yatchimatta Mon wa Shō ga nē")
As they near Fishman Island, the Straw Hats are attacked by the New Fishman Pirates, a crew of hostile fishmen, and fall overboard. Though separated again, the Straw Hats are able to make it to shore thanks to the friendlier fishmen and mermaids of the island. Luffy immediately begins to seek out the rest of his crew, while reconnecting with friends he has not seen in two years and exploring the island. When Madam Sharley, a mermaid fortuneteller, predicts that Luffy will destroy the island, the Straw Hats are invited to the royal palace. However, it is revealed to be a plot to detain them and save the island. When the Straw Hats assembled there learn of this they are forced to defeat the island's king Neptune and his royal guard and take control of the palace to avoid capture.
| 63 | Otohime and Tiger; Otohime to Taigā (オトヒメとタイガー) | August 4, 2011; 978-4-08-870270-4 | July 3, 2012; 978-1-4215-4307-9 |
615. "Mark-Mark Curse" (マトマトの呪い, "Mato Mato no Noroi"); 616. "Anniversary for Revenge" (復讐の記念日, "Fukushū no Kinenbi"); 617. "Incident at Coral Hill" (サンゴヶ丘で大事件, "Sangogaoka de Daijiken"); 618. "Proposal" (プロポーズ, Puropōzu"); 619. "At the Forest of the Sea" (海の森にて, "Umi no Mori nite"); 620. "The Wonderful Amusement Park" (憧れの遊園地, "Akogare no Yūenchi"); 621. "Otohime and Tiger" (オトヒメとタイガー, "Otohime to Taigā"); 622. "The Sun Pirates" (タイヨウの海賊団, "Taiyō no Kaizoku-dan"); 623. "Fisher Tiger the Pirate" (海賊フィッシャー・タイガー, "Kaizoku Fisshā Taigā"); 624. "Queen Otohime" (オトヒメ王妃, "Otohime Ōhi"); 625. "Uninherited Will" (受け継がない意志, "Uketsuganai Ishi"); 626. "Neptune Brothers" (ネプチューン3兄弟, "Nepuchūn San Kyōdai")
Vander Decken IX, a fishman with the cursed power of the Mark-Mark Fruit, and Hody Jones, the leader of the New Fishman Pirates, join forces to start the complete destruction of Fishman Island. Meanwhile, Luffy befriends the island's mermaid princess Shirahoshi. Luffy and most of the Straw Hats flee and eventually regroup with Jimbei. They learn that Jimbei released Arlong into the East Blue, and also learn of the island's history. In a flashback, the Sun Pirates, a pirate group led by Fisher Tiger which includes Jimbei and Arlong, become infamous. After discovering an enslaved girl named Koala, the pirates travel to her hometown. However, Tiger dies after being attacked by the Marines on a trap and refusing a blood treatment. Jimbei replaces Tiger as the Sun Pirates' captain and Arlong - frustrated with this action - decides to go his separate ways. After becoming a Warlord by the World Government, Jimbei disbands the pirates. In her attempt to help ban discrimination against fishmen and humans, Otohime is assassinated and has her three sons and her daughter protect the queen's ideals before her death.
| 64 | 100,000 vs. 10; Jūman Bāsasu Jū (10万vs.10) | November 4, 2011; 978-4-08-870301-5 | September 4, 2012; 978-1-4215-4329-1 |
627. "Thank You" (かたじけない, "Katajikenai"); 628. "Spring Cleaning" (大掃除, "Ōsōji"); 629. "Former Warlord in the Way" (立ち塞がる元七武海, "Tachifusagaru Moto Shichibukai"); 630. "Getting Violent" (暴れ出す, "Abaredasu"); 631. "Conchcorde Plaza" (ギョンコルド広場, "Gyonkorudo Hiroba"); 632. "I Knew" (知ってた, "Shitteta"); 633. "Friend or Foe" (敵か味方か, "Teki ka Mikata ka"); 634. "100,000 vs. 10" (10万vs.10, "Jūman Bāsasu Jū"); 635. "So Scary I Ran Up to the Sky" (空を飛ぶ程悍ましい, "Sora o Tobu Hodo Ozamashii"); 636. "General from Future Land" (未来国からきた将軍, "Miraikoku kara Kita Shōgun")
In the present, Nami forgives Jimbei's life for his actions and reveals that she only resents Arlong of all the fishmen. Everyone panics as Hody announces to Fishman island via Transponder Snail the coup d'etat to take over the kingdom and his intention to kill the Straw Hat Pirates and including Luffy for defeating Arlong. Luffy decides to go rescue the rest of his crew, but Jimbei conceives a plan. Jimbei, Shirahoshi and Megalo rush to the palace and it is revealed to Jimbei that Hody was the responsible for assassinating Otohime. Using Nami's Mirage Tempo technique, the Straw Hat Pirates appear before the people of Fishman Island, and the Fishman Pirates' prisoners are freed. They then reveal that they have the Celestial Dragon's letter and Otohime's petition. In the ensuing fight with Hody, Luffy and the Straw Hats take out most of Hody's men. However, in a desperate attempt to destroy the island, Vander Decken IX uses his devil fruit powers to hurl Noah, an ancient ship, in an effort to destroy everything around it.
| 65 | To Nothing; Zero ni (ゼロに) | February 3, 2012; 978-4-08-870367-1 | November 6, 2012; 978-1-4215-4979-8 |
637. "The Ancient Ark" (古の方舟, "Inishie no Hakobune"); 638. "Escape-Hoshi" (にげほし, "Nigehoshi"); 639. "Protect Everything" (全部守る, "Zenbu Mamoru"); 640. "Above Fishman Island" (魚人島直上, "Gyojintō Chokujō"); 641. "What Are You?" (お前は何だ, "Omae wa Nan da"); 642. "Lost All Face" (面目など丸潰れ, "Menmoku nado Marutsubure"); 643. "Phantom" (ファントム, "Fantomu"); 644. "To Nothing" (ゼロに, "Zero ni"); 645. "Death Is Another Form of Revenge" (死もまた復讐, "Shi mo Mata Fukushū"); 646. "Frog" (カエル, "Kaeru")
As the Straw Hats fight the New Fishman Pirates' leaders, Luffy stops Shirahoshi from sacrificing herself and flies up to the Noah with her and Fukaboshi. Hody betrays Vander Decken and defeats him before challenging Luffy. As Luffy fights with Hody, Decken falls unconscious, consequently destroying the bubble. As everyone in Fishman Island is evacuating, Fukaboshi reveals to Luffy that Hody was created from the resentment against humans. Encouraged by Fukaboshi, Luffy proceeds to fight with Hody as the Ammo Knights launch a bubble to cover the Noah again, Luffy defeats Hody and attempts to destroy the ship to save the island. Meanwhile, the rest of the Straw Hats defeat Hody's officers.
| 66 | The Road Toward the Sun; Taiyō e to Tsuzuku Michi (タイヨウへと続く道) | May 2, 2012; 978-4-08-870416-6 | March 5, 2013; 978-1-4215-5237-8 |
647. "Stop, Noah" (止まれノア, "Tomare Noa"); 648. "The Road Toward the Sun" (タイヨウへと続く道, "Taiyō e to Tsuzuku Michi"); 649. "The Dance of Breams and Plaices" (タイやヒラメの舞い踊り, "Tai ya Hirame no Maiodori"); 650. "Two Changes to Be Aware Of" (知っておくべき2つの変化, "Shitteokubeki Futatsu no Henka"); 651. "A Voice from the New World" (新世界からの声, "Shinsekai Kara no Koe"); 652. "A Premonition of Stormy Seas" (前途多難の予感, "Zento Tanan no Yokan"); 653. "The Hero Hat" (ヒーローの帽子, "Hīrō no Bōshi"); 654. "A Gam of Whales" (GAM（小群）, "Gamu (Shōgun)"); 655. "Punk Hazard" (パンクハザード, "Panku Hazādo"); 656. "Adventure on the Burning Island" (燃える島の冒険, "Moeru Shima no Bōken")
After Shirahoshi stops Luffy from destroying Noah, Jimbei gives his blood to a dying Luffy and tells the citizens that the law on Fishman Island is a farce. As Luffy recovers, Hody, Decken and the New Fishman Pirates are sent to jail and all charges against the Straw Hat Pirates are finally dropped. The Straw Hats and the island's citizens to celebrate their victory. Caribou steals the kingdom's treasure, however, but Luffy, Zoro and Sanji chase him and take it back. Luffy intercepts a call from Big Mom, one of the Four Emperors, to her henchmen and tells her that he ate the candy originally for her, and challenges Big Mom to a war before giving the treasure to Big Mom in place of the candy to Nami's dismay. Shirahoshi makes the Straw Hats promise to see her again before the Straw Hats and the fishmen go their separate ways. Using a group of whales, Luffy and the others finally reach the New World. Over the Transponder Snail, a man asks for help before he is attacked. Reaching the burning island Punk Hazard, the Straw Hats go their separate ways to visit the island.
| 67 | Cool Fight | August 3, 2012; 978-4-08-870476-0 | June 4, 2013; 978-1-4215-5371-9 |
657. "Severed Head" (生首, "Namakubi"); 658. "The Biscuits Room" (ビスケットルーム, "Bisuketto Rūmu"); 659. "About My Torso" (胴体の話, "Dōtai no Hanashi"); 660. "Trafalgar Law, Warlord of the Sea" (〝王下七武海〟トラファルガー・ロー, "'Ōka Shichibukai' Torafarugā Rō); 661. "Lakeside Bandits" (追い剥ぎの出る湖, "Oihagi no Deru Mizuumi"); 662. "Warlord Law vs. Vice Admiral Smoker" (七武海ローVS.スモーカー中将, "Shichibukai Rō Bāsasu Sumōkā Chūjō"); 663. "CC"; 664. "Master Caesar Clown" (M・シーザー・クラウン, "Masutā Shīzā Kuraun"); 665. "Candy"; 666. "Yeti Cool Brothers" (イエティ COOL BROTHERS, "Ieti Kūru Burazāzu"); 667. "Cool Fight"
While Luffy, Zoro, Robin and Usopp visit Punk Hazard, Franky, Sanji, Nami and Chopper discover a living head belonging to a samurai named Kin'emon who is searching for his son Momonosuke. The four escape into a children's room called the Biscuits Room and attempt to release the giant children imprisoned there. Brook, meanwhile, discovers the samurai's torso. A group of naval officers, led by Smoker and Tashigi, arrive at the island as Luffy and the others confront a group of creatures along the way. Meanwhile, Smoker and Tashigi are confronted by Trafalgar Law, who has become a Warlord. Law swaps the hearts of Franky, Sanji, Nami and Chopper while Luffy and the others are rescued by Brownbeard, a pirate living on the island. Luffy meets Law once again, just before the Warlord swaps Tashigi and Smoker's hearts. Luffy and the others learn about the history of Punk Hazard: once the experiment facility of Dr. Vegapunk, the government scientist involved in one of his failed experiments, sealed off the island and fled.
| 68 | Pirate Alliance; Kaizoku Dōmei (海賊同盟) | November 2, 2012; 978-4-08-870531-6 | September 3, 2013; 978-1-4215-5881-3 |
668. "Pirate Alliance" (海賊同盟, "Kaizoku Dōmei"); 669. "Commence Operation" (作戦開始, "Sakusen Kaishi"); 670. "Blizzard with a Chance of Slime" (吹雪ときどきSlime, "Fubuki Tokidoki Suraimu"); 671. "Gas-Gas Fruit" (ガスガスの実, "Gasu Gasu no Mi"); 672. "My Name is Kin'emon!!" (拙者!!名を錦えもんと申す!!, "Sessha!! Na o Kin'emon to Mōsu!!"); 673. "Vergo and Joker" (ヴェルゴとジョーカー, "Verugo to Jōkā"); 674. "The Observers" (傍観者達, "Bōkansha-tachi"); 675. "I Call It Land of the Dead" (その名も「シノクニ」, "Sono Na mo 'Shinokuni'"); 676. "The Perfect Weapon of Mass Murder" (完全なる殺戮兵器, "Kanzen naru Satsuriku Heiki"); 677. "Counter Hazard!!"; 678. "Lobby of Laboratory Building A" (研究所内A棟ロビー, "Kenkyūjo-nai Ē-Tō Robī")
Law proposes an alliance with the Straw Hats; Luffy agrees. Law's plan requires the abduction of Caesar Clown, so they split into teams: Luffy, Robin, and Franky go to capture Caesar, while Law and Chopper study the drugs that have were given to the giant children; meanwhile, Sanji, Zoro, and Brook reunite Kin'emon as Nami and Usopp watch the kids, who are suffering withdrawal. Tashigi and Smoker work with and against Luffy to apprehend Caesar, who uses his gas-gas powers to asphyxiate and overpower that team. Law is similarly captured by Vergo, a Vice Admiral revealed to be a double agent of Warlord Doflamingo; as commander of G-5, Vergo has concealed the kidnappings. Instead of purifying the poison gas that closed Punk Hazard, Caesar condensed it into a toxic pet slime named Smiley, which he releases and turns into a new weapon: Land of the Dead, a purple cloud that turns flesh to stone on contact. Law, Luffy, and the other captives escape before the cloud arrives and reunite with the other Straw Hats, pursuing Caesar into the last intact laboratory on Punk Hazard.
| 69 | S.A.D. SAD | March 4, 2013; 978-4-08-870614-6 | December 3, 2013; 978-1-4215-6143-1 |
679. "The G-5 Spirit" (心意気G-5, "Kokoroiki Jī-Faibu"); 680. "G-5 Commander Vergo the Bamboo Demon" (海軍G-5基地長〝鬼竹のヴェルゴ〟, "Kaigun Jī-Faibu Kichichō 'Kichiku no Verugo'"); 681. "Luffy vs. Master" (ルフィvs.M, "Rufi Bāsasu Masutā"); 682. "Puppet Master" (黒幕, "Kuromaku"); 683. "An Icy Woman" (氷の様な女, "Kōri no Yō na Onna"); 684. "Don't Do It, Vegapunk" (やめるんだベガパンク, "Yamerun da Begapanku"); 685. "My Name Is Momonosuke" (モモの助、せっしゃの名にござる!!, "Momonosuke, Sessha no Na ni gozaru!!"); 686. "The Snow-Woman in the Biscuits Room" (ビスケットルームの雪女, "Bisuketto Rūmu no Yuki Onna"); 687. "Wild Beast" (猛獣, "Mōjū"); 688. "Mocha" (モチャ); 689. "The Island That's There but Isn't There" (ない様である島, "Nai Yō de Aru Shima"); 690. "S.A.D." (SAD)
Caesar allows the cloud to flood the lab, forcing the Marines and pirates to run through the chambers. As Vergo arrives, the Marines briefly celebrate until he starts fighting them; Sanji delays Vergo and the Marines conclude that he must have been an imposter. Law splits from the main group to sabotage Caesar's factory; Vergo returns to fight Law and Smoker. Caesar triggered the explosion that devastated Punk Hazard, shown in a flashback, as retaliation for exile from the scientific program by Dr. Vegapunk. As Luffy fights Caesar, Monet helps in defense and Luffy falls into an underground trash pit, where he meets Momonosuke, who became a dragon after eating an artificial devil fruit; they escape together. The children, maddened by withdrawal, pursue Mocha and the pirates keeping them away from Caesar's addictive candy, which are laced with experimental drugs. Law wants to kidnap Caesar because he is the sole source of Smile, the artificial devil fruit. Luffy overpowers Caesar and Law defeats Vergo, declaring their place in a new world order.
| 70 | Enter Doflamingo; Dofuramingo Arawaru (ドフラミンゴ現る) | June 4, 2013; 978-4-08-870660-3 | March 4, 2014; 978-1-4215-6460-9 |
691. "King of the Land of the Dead" (死の国の王, "Shi no Kuni no Ō"); 692. "Assassins from Dressrosa" (ドレスローザから来た刺客, "Doresurōza kara Kita Shikaku"); 693. "Die for Me" (死んでくれ, "Shindekure"); 694. "The Most Dangerous Man" (最も危険な男, "Mottomo Kiken na Otoko"); 695. "Leave It to Us!!!" (任せろ!!!, "Makasero!!!"); 696. "Alignment of Interests" (利害の一致, "Rigai no Itchi"); 697. "A Deal" (取り引き, "Torihiki"); 698. "Enter Doflamingo" (ドフラミンゴ現る, "Dofuramingo Arawaru"); 699. "Morning Edition" (朝刊, "Chōkan"); 700. "His Momentum" (奴のペース, "Yatsu no Pēsu")
Caesar opens vents and lets in the Land of the Dead, attempting to block the last escape route; incensed that Caesar is petrifying his allies, Luffy finally knocks him unconscious and sends him flying towards Buffalo and Baby 5, devil fruit users sent by Doflamingo. As the pirates escape, Doflamingo commands Monet to set off the last bomb, but she is thwarted inadvertently by Caesar. Although Buffalo and Baby 5 flee with Caesar, all three are brought down by Nami and Usopp. Kin'emon miraculously survives being turned to stone and reunites with Momonosuke; petrification paralyzes the victim in a hard shell but does not kill them. Law treats the rescued children; Smoker and Tashigi promise to take them home. As they all celebrate, Law tells Luffy he will use Doflamingo to take down Kaido, one of the Four Emperors; Luffy agrees and explains his goal is to take down all Four. Law leaves the living severed heads of Buffalo and Baby 5 for Doflamingo, along with an offer to keep Kaido satisfied by returning Caesar to continue manufacturing Smile, but only if Doflamingo will resign as a Warlord overnight. Shockingly, he agrees and the Straw Hats head to Dressrosa with Law to meet him.
| 71 | Coliseum of Scoundrels; Kusemono-tachi no Koroshiamu (曲者達のコロシアム) | August 2, 2013; 978-4-08-870781-5 | June 3, 2014; 978-1-4215-6945-1 |
701. "Adventure in the Land of Love, Passion and Toys" (愛と情熱とオモチャの国の冒険, "Ai to Jōnetsu to Omocha no Kuni no Bōken"); 702. "Corrida Coliseum" (コリーダコロシアム, "Korīda Koroshiamu"); 703. "Waiting Room" (控室, "Hikaeshitsu"); 704. "Lucy and the Statue of Kyros" (ルーシーとキュロスの像, "Rūshī to Kyurosu no Zō"); 705. "Maynard the Pursuer" (追撃のメイナード, "Tsuigeki no Meinādo"); 706. "I Ain't Gonna Laugh at Ya" (お前を笑わない, "Omae o Warawanai"); 707. "Block B" (Bブロック, "Bī Burokku"); 708. "Coliseum of Scoundrels" (曲者達のコロシアム, "Kusemono-tachi no Koroshiamu"); 709. "King Punch!!" (キング・パンチ!!, "Kingu Panchi!!"); 710. "To Greenbit" (グリーンビットへ, "Gurīnbitto e"); 711. "Adventure in the Land of the Little People" (小人の国の冒険, "Kobito no Kuni no Bōken")
Doflamingo is also the king of Dressrosa, famed for its living toys. When they arrive, they split into teams again: Law, Nico Robin, and Usopp will deliver Caesar, while Luffy, Zoro, Sanji, Franky, and Kin'emon will destroy the hidden Smile factory. Chopper, Brook and Nami will guard the Sunny. The plan goes awry immediately: Luffy enters a gladiator tournament as "Lucy" for the prize, the flame-flame devil fruit, which reappeared after Ace's death; Zoro is distracted after Shusui is stolen; and Sanji is lured away by Violet, a passionate dancer. The 556 fighters in the tournament are grouped into four blocks with a single winner advancing from each to the finals; advancing in Block A is Jesus Burgess, of the Blackbeard Pirates; and from Block B, Man-Eating Bartolomeo, an unpopular pirate who has barrier-barrier fruit powers. The Marines are already waiting to ambush the Caesar exchange, but they flee after being involuntarily disrobed; small humanoid Tontattas are responsible for these mysterious "fairy" pranks, and they take Nico Robin prisoner briefly until Usopp convinces the gullible Tontattas he is a legendary hero.
| 72 | Dressrosa's Forgotten; Doresurōza no Wasuremono (ドレスローザの忘れ物) | November 1, 2013; 978-4-08-870833-1 | September 2, 2014; 978-1-4215-7344-1 |
712. "Violet" (ヴァイオレット, "Vaioretto"); 713. "Usoland" (ウソランド, "Usorando"); 714. "Lucy and Moocy" (ルーシーとウーシー, "Rūshī to Ūshī"); 715. "The Battleground of Block C" (激戦区Cブロック, "Gekisenku Shī Burokku"); 716. "Don Chin Jao" (首領・チンジャオ); 717. "Dressrosa's Forgotten" (ドレスローザの忘れ物, "Doresurōza no Wasuremono"); 718. "Riku Army at the Flower Field" (お花畑のリク王軍, "Ohanabatake no Riku Ōgun"); 719. "Open, Chin Jao" (開けチンジャオ, "Hirake Chinjao"); 720. "Prisoner-Gladiators" (囚人剣闘士, "Shūjin Kentōshi"); 721. "Rebecca and the Soldier" (レベッカと兵隊さん, "Rebekka to Heitai-san")
Violet, who is one of Doflamingo's officers, takes Sanji captive, but he convinces her to defect. Doflamingo reneges on his resignation and Law attempts to escape with Caesar, but he is halted by Admiral Fujitora. Usopp is feted by the Tontattas as Usoland, but mortified to learn they expect him to lead their army into battle that day. The separated forces begin to converge; the Tontattas ask Usopp and Nico Robin to liberate their princess and other slaves working at Doflamingo's factory, while a one-legged toy soldier convinces Franky to help attack the House of Toys, explaining every living toy once was human. Giolla, another of Doflamingo's officers, attacks the Sunny crew with art-art powers. Lucy (Luffy) wins the Block C brawl, defeating Chin Jao, an old pirate who holds a grudge against Garp. Resting at the Coliseum, Bartolomeo defends the Straw Hat crew against critics, revealing himself to be an obsessive superfan who has followed their deeds since Roguetown. After his win, Luffy is invited to lunch by Rebecca, a gladiator who is trying to save the one-legged toy soldier by defeating Doflamingo first; after her mother died, the toy soldier raised her and taught her to fight. She enters the Coliseum for Block D to resounding boos as her grandfather was the hated old king overthrown by Doflamingo ten years ago.
| 73 | Operation Dressrosa S.O.P. Doresurōza Esu Ō Pī Sakusen (ドレスローザSOP作戦) | March 4, 2014; 978-4-08-880022-6 | January 6, 2015; 978-1-4215-7683-1 |
722. "Royal Bloodlines" (王族の血統, "Ōzoku no Kettō"); 723. "Change of Plans" (変更作戦, "Henkō Sakusen"); 724. "Law's Plan" (ローの作戦, "Rō no Sakusen"); 725. "The Undefeated Woman" (無敗の女, "Muhai no Onna"); 726. "The Riku Family" (リク一族, "Riku Ichizoku"); 727. "The Hero's Ambush" (待ち伏せるヒーロー, "Machibuseru Hīrō"); 728. "The Number of Tragedies" (悲劇の数, "Higeki no Kazu"); 729. "Warlord Doflamingo vs. Warlord Law" (七武海ドフラミンゴVS七武海ロー, "Shichibukai Dofuramingo Bāsasu Shichibukai Rō"); 730. "Three Cards" (3枚のカード, "Sanmai no Kādo"); 731. "Operation Dressrosa S.O.P." (ドレスローザSOP作戦, "Doresurōza Esu Ō Pī Sakusen")
After defeating Giolla, Brook, Nami, and Chopper rendezvous with Sanji and Law, who directs them to take Caesar on the Sunny to the next island, Zou. The defeated gladiators are ostensibly taken for a medical examination, but instead are dumped below the castle, landing on a pile of discarded toys, then snatched so that Sugar, one of Doflamingo's officers, turns them into enslaved toys using her hobby-hobby power. Doflamingo reveals he is a Celestial Dragon and, in a flashback, explains how he manipulated the people of Dressrosa to turn against the Riku royal family and accept him as king. The one-legged toy soldier is Rebecca's father, and Violet is Princess Viola, Rebecca's aunt. The situation continues to deteriorate: Doflamingo defeats Law and Big Mom, one of the Four Emperors, finds the Sunny enroute to Zou. Inside the Coliseum, Luffy makes plans with Bartolomeo to leave, but meets a surprising guest on the way out and cannot stop crying even after escaping to help Law defeat Doflamingo. The guest assumes the Lucy disguise in Luffy's stead.
| 74 | Ever at Your Side; Itsudemo Kimi no Soba ni Iru (いつでもキミのそばにいる) | June 4, 2014; 978-4-08-880069-1 | April 7, 2015; 978-1-4215-7867-5 |
732. "An Underground World" (地下の世界, "Chika no Sekai"); 733. "What the Soldier Wants" (兵隊さんの欲しいもの, "Heitai-san no Hoshī Mono"); 734. "The Slicing Winds of Rommel" (ロンメルのカマイタチ, "Ronmeru no Kamaitachi"); 735. "Fujitora's Plan" (藤虎の思惑, "Fujitora no Omowaku"); 736. "Supreme Officer Diamante" (最高幹部ディアマンテ, "Saikō Kanbu Diamante"); 737. "Officer's Tower" (幹部塔, "Kanbu Tō"); 738. "Trebol Army, Special Officer Sugar" (トレーボル軍 特別幹部シュガー, "Torēboru Gun - Tokubetsu Kanbu Shugā"); 739. "Captain" (隊長, "Taichō"); 740. "It's in Your Hands!!!" (頼む!!!, "Tanomu!!!"); 741. "Usoland the Liar" (うそつきウソランド, "Usotsuki Usorando"); 742. "Ever at Your Side" (いつでもキミのそばにいる, "Itsudemo Kimi no Soba ni Iru")
The toy soldier outlines his plan to infiltrate the factory and knock out Sugar, turning all the toys back into humans and Tontattas. As a distraction, Franky fights Señor Pink at the entrance to the House of Toys. Rebecca wins the fight in Block D after Hakuba eliminates the competition. Hakuba is the alter-ego of Cavendish, who is jealous of Luffy's fame, unleashed by falling asleep. Luffy, Zoro, and Kin'emon meet Viola, who takes them into the palace. The final match in the Coliseum begins, matching Doflamingo officer Diamante against the four finalists; the winner is the first who can take the flame-flame fruit from the back of a vicious fighting fish. A flashback shows how Rebecca's father, Kyros, grows from a criminal to an undefeated gladiator and captain of the royal guard; he eventually marries Viola's older sister Scarlet. The Tontattas attempt to force-feed Sugar a spicy morsel, but she evades them, turning many into toys, including Nico Robin; after she feeds it to Usopp, who is trapped in Trebol's sticky web, the terrible face he makes shocks Sugar into unconsciousness.
| 75 | Repaying the Debt; Ore no Ongaeshi (おれの恩返し) | September 4, 2014; 978-4-08-880171-1 | August 4, 2015; 978-1-4215-8029-6 |
743. "Dressrosa Trembles" (激震のドレスローザ, "Gekishin no Doresurōza"); 744. "Revolutionary Army Chief of Staff" (革命軍参謀総長, "Kakumeigun Sanbō Sōchō"); 745. "The Birdcage" (鳥カゴ, "Torikago"); 746. "Stars" (星, "Hoshi"); 747. "Supreme Officer Pica" (最高幹部ピーカ, "Saikō Kanbu Pīka"); 748. "Repaying the Debt" (おれの恩返し, "Ore no Ongaeshi"); 749. "Onward, Gallery of Rogues!!" (すすめ!! 曲者軍団, "Susume!! Kusemono Gundan"); 750. "Flash Points" (戦局, "Senkyoku"); 751. "Sabo vs. Admiral Fujitora" (サボVS大将藤虎, "Sabo Bāsasu Taishō Fujitora"); 752. "Palm" (掌, "Tenohira")
All the toys return to human after Sugar's shock, causing chaos throughout Dressrosa. Lucy grabs and eats the Flame-Flame Fruit, winning the tournament; after shedding the disguise, he is revealed as Sabo, the Revolutionary Army chief of staff and Luffy's long-lost sworn brother alongside Ace. Usopp, barely conscious, is hailed as a hero and deity. With his plans in tatters, Doflamingo wraps all of Dressrosa in an unbreakable birdcage using his string-string powers and Officer Pica reconfigures the castle into a massive four-step tower. Doflamingo declares massive bounties on Law and the Straw Hats, reserving the highest bounty of 500 million berries for "God" Usopp, successfully turning the population against the pirates. Zoro fights Pica as the remaining gladiators and pirates rush towards Doflamingo with Luffy and Law.
| 76 | Just Keep Going; Kamawazu Susume (構わず進め) | December 27, 2014; 978-4-08-880219-0 | November 3, 2015; 978-1-4215-8260-3 |
753. "Battle" (戦, "Ikusa"); 754. "Making Acquaintance" (お見知り置きを, "Omishirioki o"); 755. "A Man's World" (男の世界, "Otoko no Sekai"); 756. "The Fourth Step" (4段目, "Yondanme"); 757. "Trump Card" (切り札, "Kirifuda"); 758. "Just Keep Going" (構わず進め, "Kamawazu Susume"); 759. "Secret Plan" (秘策, "Hisaku"); 760. "The Same Bet" (同じ賭け, "Onaji Kake"); 761. "The Op-Op Fruit" (オペオペの実, "Ope Ope no Mi"); 762. "The White Town" (白い町, "Shiroi Machi"); 763. "Declaration of Humanity" (人間宣言, "Ningen Sengen")
The restored gladiators and pirates continue to advance towards Doflamingo; Kin'emon is reunited with his colleague Kanjuro. Rebecca arrives at the fourth step, where she is confronted by Diamante, but Kyros arrives to defend her, allowing Luffy and Law to advance. Although Sugar is revived briefly, Usopp and Kanjuro frighten her back into catatonia as Luffy and Law confront Doflamingo. Law's flashback shows his childhood in Flevance, famed for its beautiful all-white products made using toxic lead; over generations, the accumulation of lead shortened their lives until even children were doomed to die. With three years left to live, Law joined the Doflamingo family thirteen years ago, and endures severe hazing from Doflamingo's brother Corazon (Rocinante). When Doflamingo and Corazon were children, their father resigned from the Celestial Dragons, and their family was persecuted mercilessly.
| 77 | Smile; Sumairu (スマイル) | April 3, 2015; 978-4-08-880326-5 | February 2, 2016; 978-1-4215-8514-7 |
764. "White Monster" (ホワイトモンスター, "Howaito Monsutā"); 765. "Minion, the Isle of Fate" (運命の島ミニオン, "Unmei no Shima Minion"); 766. "Smile" (スマイル, "Sumairu"); 767. "Cora" (コラさん, "Kora-san"); 768. "The Trigger That Day" (あの日の引鉄, "Ano Hi no Hikigane"); 769. "Bellamy the Pirate" (海賊ベラミー, "Kaizoku Beramī"); 770. "The Spear of Elbaph" (エルバフの槍, "Erubafu no Yari"); 771. "Sai, Don of the Happosui Army" (八宝水軍首領・サイ, "Happō Suigun Don: Sai"); 772. "Cabbage and Lomeo" (キャベツとロメオ, "Kyabetsu to Romeo"); 773. "Half 'n Half" (ハーフ&ハーフ, "Hāfu ando Hāfu"); 774. "Leo, Captain of the Tontatta Warriors" (トンタッタ族戦士長レオ, "Tontatta-zoku Senshichō Reo"); 775. "To Russian With Love" (ルシアンに愛を込めて, "Rushian ni Ai o Komete")
Corazon hazed the children so they would leave Doflamingo, whose evil he recognized after watching him kill their father. After Law revealed his full name included "D", Corazon says the "D" are enemies of the Celestial Dragons and World Gorvement and Doflamingo would kill him for that. Corazon and Law leave the family for six months to find a cure for Law, but no one is willing to treat him. Eventually, Doflamingo calls Corazon, asking him to steal the op-op fruit and perform an immortality operation before another group of pirates can sell it to the Navy. Corazon realizes it can be used to cure Law and double-crosses his brother to steal it; after he is caught, he confesses that Law already has eaten it, saving Law's life. Doflamingo kills Corazon. Returning to the present, Luffy is knocked deep into the castle, where he fights Bellamy. Doflamingo overpowers Law. However, the tide begins to turn and one by one, the Doflamingo officers begin to fall. The healing power of Princess Mansherry of the Tontattas is revealed as Giolla attempts to revive the officers, but Mansherry is saved before anyone is healed.
| 78 | Champion of Evil; Aku no Karisuma (悪のカリスマ) | July 3, 2015; 978-4-08-880422-4 | May 3, 2016; 978-1-4215-8584-0 |
776. "Hero of the Coliseum" (コロシアムの英雄, "Koroshiamu no Eiyū"); 777. "Zoro vs. Pica" (ゾロVSピーカ, "Zoro Bāsasu Pīka"); 778. "Tactics No. 5"; 779. "His Final Battle" (最期のケンカ, "Saigo no Kenka"); 780. "The Heart Curse" (ハートの呪縛, "Hāto no Jubaku"); 781. "Desire" (本懐, "Honkai"); 782. "Champion of Evil" (悪のカリスマ, "Aku no Karisuma"); 783. "In My Way" (邪魔だ, "Jama da"); 784. "Gear Four" (ギア4, "Gia Fōsu"); 785. "On Broken Legs" (足が折れても, "Ashi ga Oretemo")
The last few officers, Diamante, Pica, and Bellamy, fall to Kyros, Zoro, and Luffy; Doflamingo begins shrinking the birdcage, hoping to kill all the witnesses to his tyranny. Luffy returns to fight Doflamingo, but is stopped by Trebol's sticky net; with the last of his strength, Law defeats Trebol so that Luffy can continue the fight, and Luffy takes Law back to the others for treatment before reengaging Doflamingo. Pushed to the limit, Luffy shows off a new Gear Four: Bounceman and starts to beat Doflamingo down before he destroys Dressrosa completely with the birdcage.
| 79 | Lucy!! | October 3, 2015; 978-4-08-880496-5 | August 2, 2016; 978-1-4215-8815-5 |
786. "Gyats" (ギャッツ, "Gyattsu"); 787. "Four Minutes Before" (4分前, "Yonpun Mae"); 788. "My Battle" (私の戦い, "Watashi no Tatakai"); 789. "Lucy!!"; 790. "Heaven and Earth" (天と地, "Ten to Chi"); 791. "Rubble" (ガレキ, "Gareki"); 792. "On Hands and Knees" (土下座, "Dogeza"); 793. "Tiger and Dog" (虎と犬, "Tora to Inu"); 794. "Sabo's Adventure" (サボの冒険, "Sabo no Bōken"); 795. "Suicide" (自殺, "Jisatsu")
Although weak, Doflamingo remains conscious, continuing to constrict the birdcage. Luffy has exhausted his Haki and needs ten minutes to rest, promising a one-hit knockout; the other pirates and people of Dressrosa, inspired by ex-King Riku, resist the birdcage as much as possible. Jesus Burgess attempts to attack Luffy during that interval, but is stopped by Sabo. With Doflamingo's defeat, the birdcage vanishes and multiple wars collapse as weapons shipments cease. In the aftermath, Admiral Fujitora apologizes to Riku for the World Government's involvement. Sabo explains he lost his memory after being shot by the Celestial Dragons and was raised by Luffy's father Monkey D. Dragon; during the coverage of Ace's death, the connection between Luffy and Dragon caused Sabo to remember his sworm brothers. Nami, Sanji, Chopper, and Brook are shown in a pitched fight on an unnamed island (Zou) with foes who are seeking a samurai, and finally, Kaido, one of the Four Emperors, survives a fall from a sky island onto the hideout of the Kid Pirates, who have allied with Scratchman Apoo and Basil Hawkins.
| 80 | Opening Speech; Kaimaku Sengen (開幕宣言) | December 28, 2015; 978-4-08-880578-8 | November 1, 2016; 978-1-4215-9024-0 |
796. "Soldier's Conviction" (兵隊さんの決意, "Heitai-san no Ketsui"); 797. "Rebecca" (レベッカ, "Rebekka"); 798. "Heart" (ハート, "Hāto"); 799. "Father and Sons" (親と子, "Oya to Ko"); 800. "Sons' Cups" (子分盃, "Kobun Sakazuki"); 801. "Opening Speech" (開幕宣言, "Kaimaku Sengen"); 802. "Zou" (ゾウ, "Zō"); 803. "Elephant Climbing" (登象, "Tozō"); 804. "Adventure in the Land Atop the Elephant's Back" (象の背の国の冒険, "Zō no Se no Kuni no Bōken"); 805. "The Minks" (ミンク族, "Minku-zoku"); 806. "At Rightflank Fortress" (右腹の砦にて, "Ubara no Toride nite")
Admiral Fujitora finally moves to arrest Law and the Straw Hats; as they flee, Luffy kidnaps reluctant royal Rebecca, who wants to live with her father Kyros. The Tontattas sow confusion to help the escaping pirates. However, as Fujitora threatens to crush the ships with rubble, Luffy starts fighting him and the people of Dressrosa rush to the port, preventing the Admiral from dropping the rubble. Seven of the ex-gladiators, who are captains and commanders of 5,600 ships, promise to swear allegiance to the Straw Hats but Luffy turns them down, as he believes being King of the Pirates means he should be the freest man, not the most powerful one. Bartolomeo ferries the Straw Hats to Zou aboard his ship, the Mister Luffy Go and updates their bounties. When they arrive at Zou, an island carried on the back of Zunesha, a massive elephant, they are met by humanoid animals who call themselves minks, reeling from an attack from one of Kaido's subordinates. The pirates are hailed by the minks as saviors and reunited with the remainder of their crew, save Sanji.

== Lists of main series chapters ==
- List of One Piece chapters 1 to 186
- List of One Piece chapters 187 to 388
- List of One Piece chapters 389 to 594
- List of One Piece chapters 807 to 1015
- List of One Piece chapters 1016 to now

== See also ==
- List of One Piece media
