= List of One Piece cover stories =

Brief stories in the One Piece universe

The One Piece cover stories develop major and minor characters through focused storylines in addition to the main plot following the adventures of the Straw Hat Pirates in the One Piece manga chapters. Each chapter of the manga is preceded by a cover page, which series author and artist Eiichiro Oda uses either to draw reader requests, present a scene with the Straw Hats, or serialize cover stories. The first cover story explained how Buggy the Clown reunited with his pirate crew and formed an alliance with Alvida after his defeat by Monkey D. Luffy in Orange Town. The cover stories provide official details which explain later appearances, such as the friendship between the pirate Django and Navy officer Fullbody ("Django's Dance Paradise") shown during the Marineford Arc. With few exceptions, they have not been animated. As of 2026, there are 19 cover stories.

== Buggy's Crew: After the Battle! ==
Buggy's Crew: After the Battle!
Timing	After: Buggy's defeat (Orange Town)
Timing	Before: Straw Hat Pirates land in Roguetown
Parts	25 (ch. 35–75)
Key characters	Buggy, Alvida
Animated as	"Buggy's Adventure" (S1:46–47)

Other translated titles used in the manga for this cover series are "Adventures of Buggy's Crew" and "Adventures of Ritchie's Pirate Crew!"

The diminished Buggy poles furiously away from Orange Town, pursued by hungry fish. When Buggy reaches land, he hungrily pursues a baby bird, but drops the plan when he runs into the enormous mother and tries, unsuccessfully, to trap her. She eats him but he tastes foul so she spits him out; he flies through the air until he reaches the Island of Rare Animals, where he duels and later befriends Gaimon. Gaimon sends him off on a new ship, which is wrecked by an enormous crab, and Buggy is rescued by a beautiful woman; as they are both pursuing Luffy, they join forces.

Meanwhile, Richie, Mohji, and Cabaji are chased out of town by Chouchou. The crew mourn their fallen captain, setting up a memorial with the leftover body parts. Mohji and Cabaji fight to determine the next captain, but both are defeated by a sleepwalking Ritchie. The Ritchie Pirates soon are defeated by the indigenous Kumate tribe, who start stewing the lion captain in red wine and release Buggy's body parts. Alvida and Buggy sight his former ship and land near his memorial; restored, Buggy single-handedly defeats the Kumates. The reformed Buggy Pirates sail away.

== Koby and Helmeppo's Chronicle of Toil ==
Koby and Helmeppo's Chronicle of Toil
Timing	After: Morgan's defeat (Shells Town)
Timing	Before: Water 7
Parts	30 (ch. 83–119)
Key characters	Koby, Helmeppo, Garp
Animated as	"Diary of Koby-Meppo" (S2:68–69)

Diligent Koby and resentful Helmeppo begin their Navy careers as chore boys, scrubbing floors and laundry; they are assigned to the ship escorting Helmeppo's father to prison. Helmeppo frets that Captain "Axe-Hand" Morgan may be sentenced to death as Garp's ship arrives to take the prisoner. Morgan takes advantage of Garp's narcolepsy and seizes Helmeppo as a hostage, running away on a small launch. As the sailors prepare to fire on the launch with Morgan and Helmeppo, Koby stands in front of the cannon to save his friend; eventually, Garp disables the cannon. Helmeppo denounces Morgan and escapes by swimming back to Garp's ship and the pair beg the Vice Admiral's forgiveness. Morgan is left adrift while Garp takes Koby and Helmeppo back to Navy Headquarters, where he puts them through intense training.

== Django's Dance Paradise ==
Django's Dance Paradise
Timing	After: Kuro's defeat (Syrup Village)
Timing	Before: Impel Down
Parts	37 (ch. 126–172)
Key characters	Django, Fullbody

Django awakens to see the Black Cat Pirates sailing away; some time later, Onion recognizes him eating at a restaurant and the Usopp Pirates chase him out of town. Kaya has become a doctor's apprentice. While sailing to Mirror Ball Island, Django passes Morgan, each unaware of the other's boat. Ashore, he realizes the Navy is looking for him, so he disguises himself and enters a dance contest, which he wins; Fullbody is the runner-up. As they celebrate together, the Navy find Django's original clothes, raising Fullbody's suspicions.

However, the Tulip Pirates, led by Captain Eureka, attack Mirror Ball Island and Django takes advantage of the chaos to escape; Fullbody fights the Tulips, but they take a hostage, forcing his surrender. As Eureka stands triumphant over Fullbody, Django returns, teaming up with Fullbody to defeat the Tulip Pirates. Django is taken into custody and sentenced to death, but Fullbody protests through dance and wins his friend's freedom. As Django intends to flee, he hypnotizes Fullbody to forget their friendship, but they are distracted by the beauty of Captain Hina and both decide to join her crew.

== Hachi's Walk on the Sea Floor ==
Hachi's Walk on the Sea Floor
Timing	After: Arlong's defeat (Arlong Park)
Timing	Before: Sabaody Archipelago
Parts	40 (ch. 182–228)
Key characters	Hachi, Camie

Hachi escapes custody and leaps into the sea, where he helps a panda shark, who gives him a gift of meat, which he uses to feed a hungry man stranded on an island. The man gives him a ring, which he returns to the goldfish princess, and she gives him a golden trident; he saves a sea boar by stabbing a larger sea monster in the tongue, and the boar spits out Camie, the mermaid, and her friend Pappagu. The Macro Fishman Pirates arrive and greet their old friend Hachi; he sells Camie to them for a map to a delicious takoyaki recipe, but it is a trap which leads to the Great Octomash. Enraged, Hachi defeats Octomash and hunts down the Macro Pirates, then destroys the cage holding Camie. The Macro Pirates protest, saying the map does lead to the treasure, and Hachi returns to Octomash with Camie and Pappagu, where he finds the secret sauce hidden in the giant octopus.

Hachi returns to pursuing his girlfriend, Octopako; along the way, he feeds a village of starving catfish she had passed and mocked. He makes a final trade, exchanging his treasures for cooking equipment, and opens a takoyaki shop with Camie and Pappagu. Octopako asks for the last box of takoyaki but rejects Hachi's proposal of marriage, so he gives it to the catfish elder instead, earning a punch from Octopako as she leaves. Abandoned with Camie and Pappagu, he remembers his childhood dream of owning a takoyaki cart and the catfish village repay him by building a new floating restaurant for him, the Takoyaki 8.

== Wapol's Omnivorous Rampage ==
Wapol's Omnivorous Rampage
Timing	After: Wapol's defeat (Drum Island)
Timing	Before: Reverie
Parts	23 (ch. 236–262)
Key characters	Wapol

On Drum Island, new king Dalton of the Cherry Blossom Kingdom helps the citizens by shoveling snow. After landing far away, fallen king Wapol eats trees, lamps, and benches before consuming an entire town. Wapol is penniless, reduced to selling matches and living under a bridge, where he eats discarded trash, recycling it into surprisingly appealing toys which earn him a small fortune. A scientist discovers the toys contain a new alloy dubbed Wapometal and his Munch-Munch toy factory quickly expands into a corporate empire; he marries Miss Universe and declares himself king, showing his unrestrained ambition.

== Ace's Great Search for Blackbeard ==
Ace's Great Search for Blackbeard
Timing	After: Ace meets Luffy (Nanohana)
Timing	Before: Showdown at Banaro Island
Parts	29 (ch. 272–305)
Key characters	Ace, Moda

Ace does a dine and dash before attacking an innocent Dr. Black Beard in a case of mistaken identity; the incensed villagers throw him into the river and he is rescued by Moda, a milkmaid. To repay her kindness, he agrees to deliver a letter. Ace infiltrates Naval Base G-2 in a sloppy disguise and heads to the buffet as his first order of business. He blows his cover after overhearing someone insult Whitebeard but upgrades his rank by knocking out and stripping a commander. A returning reconnaissance ship is set afire by pirates, threatening its secrets; Ace leaps onto the buring ship to save lives and the information, once again revealing his identity when he returns, aflame. Before he leaves, he delivers Moda's letter to the commander of G-2, Vice Admiral Komille. Ace stole information that leads him to Blackbeard; Moda reunites with her parents, who are cooks on a Navy galley vessel; and the milk she sells to the Navy makes the base's bitter coffee palatable.

== Gedatsu's Unexpected Life on the Blue Sea ==
Gedatsu's Unexpected Life on the Blue Sea
Timing	After: Gedatsu's self-defeat (Skypeia)
Timing	Before: Reverie
Parts	32 (ch. 314–348)
Key characters	Gedatsu, Goro, Toh-Toh, Vivi

Gedatsu survives a fall from Skypeia, landing on an island full of holes dug by Goro, who dreams of building Ukkari, a hot spring island. Inspired, Gedatsu, the Sky Boss, vows to become the Boss of the Blue Sea, but first helps Goro with his holes despite his glaring lack of common sense. Eventually, Gedatsu uncovers, awakens, and vanquishes the Boss of the Earth, a giant mole miner. Gedatsu and Goro use the mole to burrow into the earth, finding a deep hot spring; the commotion awakens the Boss of the Forest, a giant baboon carpenter, which Gedatsu also defeats. Leaving the Forest Boss in charge of the island, they continue to dig with the Earth Boss, eventually surfacing in the oasis at Yuba in Alabasta. It turns out that Goro is Toh-Toh's brother; he and Koza return with Gedatsu and Goro to inspect the Forest Boss's surprisingly fine hot springs inn. Pincers sets up a shuttle bus service between Alabasta and Ukkari using the Earth Boss's tunnel. Vivi visits Ukkari with her entourage to enjoy the baths, and Gedatsu ends up as the attendant at Accidental Baths on Ukkari.

== Miss Goldenweek's Big Plan, A Baroque Reunion ==
Miss Goldenweek's Big Plan, A Baroque Reunion
Timing	After: Crocodile's defeat (Alabasta)
Timing	Before: Impel Down
Parts	42+1 (ch. 359–413)
Key characters	ex-officers of Baroque Works

Abandoned on Little Garden with Mr. 5 and Miss Valentine, Miss Goldenweek learns that Baroque Works has collapsed and starts packing to visit the prison over her colleagues' objections. They hitch a ride with a pterodactyl made amenable through her painted symbol as Brogy and Dorry resume their stalemate, reduced to using fists.

In a storm, the paint washes off and the ex-Baroque trio crash onto Vacation Island, where Captain Hina is seeking Mr. 3. They try to disguise themselves to free Mr. 2, but Hina identifies them almost immediately. Mr. 5 and Miss Goldenweek manage to escape, but Miss Valentine is captured, and the Navy threaten to hang her if the others do not surrender. As Mr. 3 flees Kyuka Island, Bon Clay pulls him back to help him rescue Miss Valentine, who is calling for help from the beach. Trussed up, Mr. 3 is flung onto a cart and rolled toward a surprised Hina; it is Bon Clay in disguise, who bursts from the bonds and knocks out Django and Fullbody before facing off with Hina. As they fight, Miss Goldenweek and Mr. 5 free Miss Valentine and hijack Hina's ship, sailing it to the Naval prison.

The reunited trio pretend to be captured to infiltrate the prison, where Crocodile, Mr. 1, and Mr. 4 are terrorizing the other prisoners. Miss Valentine and Goldenweek meet Miss Merry Christmas and Miss Doublefinger and the reformed nucleus of Baroque Works break out of the prison, although Crocodile stays behind, as he is in no mood to escape, accompanied by Mr. 1. Miss Goldenweek paints their ideal dreams into reality and the others repair an abandoned saloon, reopening it as the New Spiders Cafe. Mr. 2 and 3 are reunited with Crocodile and Mr. 1 in Impel Down

== Where Are They Now? (Skypiea) ==
Where Are They Now? cover updates
Timing	After: Eneru's defeat (Skypiea)
Timing	Before: N/A
Ch.	Characters shown
424	Conis, Aisa, Raki, Nola
425	Wyper
427	Ganfor, Shandian Chief

It is shown what the inhabitants of Skypiea do after the Straw Hat Crew left the island. Conis, Aisa, Raki, and Nola have become fast friends. Wyper works with Shandian warriors to rebuild the village. Ganfor and the Shandian Chief jointly celebrate the pumpkin harvest.

== Eneru's Great Space Mission ==
Eneru's Great Space Mission
Timing	After: Eneru flees Skypeia
Timing	Before: N/A
Parts	38 (ch. 428–474)
Key characters	Eneru, Spacey

Eneru arrives at the moon ("Endless Varse") and shocks an unconscious soldier he finds in a crater. The revived soldier, Lieutenant Spacey, snaps to attention and mourns his fallen warrior comrades before he is stabbed in the back by a space pirate. When the pirate stabs Eneru, it has no effect and Eneru easily defeats him; an explosion in the distance reveals the rest of the space pirates, who are trying to excavate ruins. Angered, Eneru fries the pirates. A flashback shows Spacey is a robot assembled on Machine Island by Dr. Tsukimi. One night, Tsukimi was surprised by an explosion on the moon and choked to death on a dumpling. Spacey and his comrades ascended to the moon using balloons to confront the perpetrator, but they were overwhelmed by the space pirates.

When Spacey returns to thank Eneru for avenging Dr. Tsukimi, the kami shocks Spacey and the rest of the robot squad, then enters a cavern uncovered by the pirates to find the subterranean city Bilka. Eneru discharges lighting into the city, reviving the winged Mooninite citizens, who show him an ancient mural which explains how they left the moon for the Blue Planet seeking resources. With an endless varse and loyal servants, Eneru is satisfied.

== Where Are They Now? (Water 7) ==
Where Are They Now? cover updates
Timing	After: The Straw Hats left Water 7
Timing	Before: N/A
Ch.	Characters shown
486	Kokoro, Yokozuna, Chimney, Gonbe
487	Iceburg, Alice
488	Paulie
490	Oimo, Kashii

It is shown what the inhabitants of Water 7 do after the Straw Hat Crew left the island. Yokozuna has found peace and hangs out at the station now. Iceburg evaluates a replacement for Kalifa. Paulie, the new president of Galley-la, runs from fans. Oimo and Kashii prepare to return to Elbaph.

== CP9's Independent Report ==
CP9's Independent Report
Timing	After: CP9's defeat (Enies Lobby)
Timing	Before: Egghead Island
Parts	33 (ch. 491–528)
Key characters	CP9, Spandam

With Enies Lobby in ruins after the Buster Call, Blueno carries Rob Lucci to safety. The rest of CP9 soberly take stock of their situation: they are refugees after their defeat, since Spandam put a bounty out for their capture. They arrive in St. Poplar, where they perform to earn money for Lucci's medical treatment: Kumadori relies on kabuki; Jabra and Blueno put on a wild animal show; Kaku becomes a children's slide, assisted by Fukurou; and Kalifa washes roofs. Lucci is successfully treated and CP9 decompress by shopping and bowling. When the Candy Pirates attack St. Poplar's port, CP9 excessively defend the town, and then return home on the hijacked pirate ship. The World Government pursues them to their home island, but are defeated by CP9. Spandam receives a call from Lucci, who vows to return one day, and CP9 sails away on the Navy ship.

== The Friends' Whereabouts ==
The Friends' Whereabouts
Timing	During: ~~3D~~2Y timeskip
Parts	16 (ch. 543–560)
Key characters	Straw Hats
Animated as	"Straw Hats' Separation Serial" (S12:418–421; S13:453–456)

Each story is told over a pair of covers with a separate title for each character:

- "Kamabakka Hell Insanity": Sanji flees pursuing kamabakka but eventually adopts their ways.
- "They Do Such Terrible Things": Prisoner Robin is freed by the Revolutionary Army.
- "I'm No Good This Week": Franky is chased by cyborg animals and finds Vegapunk's birthplace.
- "I'll Die If I'm Alone Disease": Usopp overeats on Bowin Island.
- "I'm Not Food, You Jerks": Chopper's unlikely bird allies save him from being eaten.
- "Weather Report": Nami gets an education on Weatheria sky island.
- "Repayment for a Night's Stay and Underwear": Brook writes music for underwear-flashing summoners.
- "Where Are They? What a Pain": Zoro lands in a crumbling castle.

== Decks of the World ==
Decks of the World
Timing	After: Straw Hats reunion (Sabaody Archipelago)
Timing	Before: Reverie
Parts	48 (ch. 613–668)
Key characters	numerous

News Coos bring newspapers proclaiming the return of the Straw Hat Pirates after the two-year timeskip; minor characters are shown reading the articles.

In Windmill Village, the mayor fumes while Makino and the villagers celebrate. Dadan pastes the article in a scrapbook. Rika continues to make onigiri for the Marines in Shells Town; Zoro's old sensei shares the news with Kuina at Frost Moon Village. Mayor Boodle eagerly reads the news at a rebuilt pet food shop with Chouchou. Gaimon shares the Island of Rare Animals with Barrel Woman Sarfunkel. The Usopp Pirates are now young teenagers in Syrup Village, where Kaya studies diligently while Merry fends off eager suitors. Yosaku and Johnny have become fishermen in Coco Village. Chef Zeff oversees Baratie remodeling; the restaurant now includes branch ships for dessert (Sister Monkfish, under Patty) and teppanyaki (Nasugashira, under Carne). The sword seller in Roguetown puts up a poster of Zoro.

Laboon and Crocus share a drink with a visitor. Miss Monday and Mr. 9 play with their baby at Whiskey Peak. Dorry and Brogy continue their stalemate. Wapol founds the evil Black Drum Kingdom. Dalton has recruited Lapins to serve in the kingdom's army and Kureha leads a hundred doctors. On Alabasta, Koza is appointed to be the environmental minister and the royal retainers are fitted with new clothes for the upcoming Reverie; Vivi turns 18 but Cobra is ailing. The Mountain Monkey Alliance has a new goal: Nakrowa, the Island of Dreams, and their old friend the Southbird has a mate (Northbird) and directional offspring. On Skypeia, Amazon and Nola take advantage of rubber bands while Aisa sells sphere clouds to children. Raki and Conis have opened a cafe together; Wyper and the fierce Shandian warriors now serve as the Kami's guardians, although the semi-retired Ganfor is more interested in harvesting pumpkins.

Tonjit has caught up to his family on Long Ring Long Land, meeting his grandchildren for the first time. Chimney is the Sea Train's newest stationmaster while Kokoro goes for a swim. Mozu and Kiwi, the Square Sisters, run a bar. Iceburg is surprised by the youth of his new secretary, Alice. Galley-la completes the second Sea Train; Zambai has entered the ship dismantling business. On Thriller Bark, Perona finds Kumacy again. The human auction on Sabaody has shut down, leaving Disco destitute. Hannyabal has realized his ambition as warden of Impel Down; his staff includes Domino, the Minochihuahua, Magellan, and Sadie, who is in love with Saldeath. In Newkama Land, Bon Clay succeeds Ivankov. Whitebeard and Ace are buried side-by-side.

== Caribou's New World Kee Hee Hee ==
Caribou's New World Kee Hee Hee
Timing	After: Caribou's rampage (Mermaid Inlet)
Timing	Before: Udon jailbreak (Wano)
Parts	46 (ch. 674–731)
Key characters	Caribou, Coribou, Gaburu, X Drake
Animated as	Partially in (S20:921)

Caribou engulfs and kidnaps the mermaids on Fish-Man Island, but is stopped and escorted away by Jimbei to Naval Base G-5, where he is taken into custody by Commodore Yarisugi. Coribou saves his brother, but Caribou steals the ship and leaves Coribou to face justice. Caribou's ship is wrecked by a storm; he washes ashore on an island, where an elderly lady nurses him back to health. He tries to sneak away, but the kindly woman gives him a meat pie for the road and points him towards the port. On the way there, he is mistaken for a "Captain Gobble" by soldiers who attempt to detain him, but once again, the woman comes to his rescue.

His curiosity piqued, Caribou returns to town and sneaks into a weapons factory and later, a rally where the soldiers proclaim that Captain Gaburu the revolutionary, his doppleganger, has returned. The demonstration is suppressed brutally and he returns to the house, where he finds the woman next to a photograph of Gaburu, her grandson. She begs him to flee and save himself from the deadly Pirate Scotch. He runs to the port, where he reunites with Coribou, who had stolen a Navy battleship. Scotch prepares to execute the grandmother, and Caribou leads his pirates against Scotch; Caribou prevails and destroys the factory. As they celebrate, X Drake arrests Caribou and takes him away; Gaburu's grandmother knew he was not her dead grandson and says, at his grave, that Caribou was just as sweet.

== The Solitary Journey of Jimbei, First Son of the Sea ==
The Solitary Journey of Jimbei, First Son of the Sea
Timing	After: leaving Caribou (G-5)
Timing	Before: Whole Cake Island
Parts	28 (ch. 751–785)
Key characters	Jimbei, Wadatsumi

As he returns to the Straw Hats, Jimbei finds a lost sea-kitten, who is upset their entire town disappeared. While pondering the mystery, he saves a capsized ship and learns, from the newspaper reporting Law and Luffy's alliance, about sea beasts rampaging in Port Town. Arriving at Port Town, the kitten points out their town is on top of the human buildings; the humans of Port Town report their offerings have disappeared. Jimbei swims underwater to find it is all the work of Wadatsumi, who was pleased with the offerings and as a reward, gave the humans the underwater town. The sea beasts, upset their city had disappeared, went on a rampage. Jimbei lectures the contrite Wadatsumi, who works to restore the two towns; the humans give Jimbei a poneglyph they had found. The underwater town is relocated next to Port Town and the sea beasts serve as docile fishing vessels to replace the ones they had sunk. Wadatsumi accompanies Jimbei when he leaves.

== Decks of the World, 500-Million-Man Arc ==
Decks of the World, 500-Million-Man Arc
Timing	After: Doflamingo's defeat (Dressrosa)
Timing	Before: Whole Cake Island
Parts	25 (ch. 805–838)
Key characters	numerous

News Coos once again deliver newspapers to all corners of the world after the fall of Doflamingo on Dressrosa.

Dadan celebrates at Makino's bar in Foosha Village. The dojo in Frost-Moon Village experiences a surge in enrollment. Kaya comforts the Usopp Pirates, overcome with admiration, in Syrup Village. Zeff is confused and proud. Nojiko is pleased but Genzo is scandalized by Nami's salacious wanted poster pose.

Laboon is pleased as Crocus reads the news; on Drum Island, the army has adopted Chopper's antlers as a helmet device. Karoo clips an article for Vivi's scrapbook. The leadership of Water 7 is both horrified and amused by Franky's odd appearance, but the inhabitants of Baldimore are proud of the cyborg. At the Birdie Kingdom, the allied humans and birds take similar pride in their adopted Chopper; some children have Chopperman costumes. Brook's longarm managers are wrathful; Heracles keeps voyaging on an enormous stag beetle. The wizards of Weatheria have purchased stylish clothes to impress Nami. Mihawk and Perona now are farming the former Muggy Kingdom with the help of the deadly baboons. Ivankov has returned to the Kamabakka Queendom, and straw hats prove popular among the Fish-Man Island youth. Rayleigh continues to gamble. Even the massive beasts on Ruskaina are happy to see Luffy's growth; Boa Hancock is bashful merely in the presence of Luffy's poster. Aokiji and Yasopp, on separate islands, read over and laugh at the news. Shanks celebrates at a wedding.

== The Saga of the Self-Proclaimed Straw Hat Fleet ==
The Saga of the Self-Proclaimed Straw Hat Fleet
Timing	After: Doflamingo's defeat (Dressrosa)
Timing	Before: Reverie
Parts	46 (ch. 864–919)
Key characters	Cavendish, Bartolomeo, Don Sai, Ideo, Blue Gilly, Leo, Hajrudin, Orlumbus, Bellamy
Animated as	Partially in (S19:885) & (S20:1081)

Each story takes place over a few covers.

- Cavendish arc: Cavendish reminisces about obsessive fans while growing up as the prince of the Bourgeois Kingdom and refuses to fire on pursuing ships proposing marriage.
- Bartolomeo arc: The Barto Club docks at a town protected by Shanks, where Bartolomeo defeats the local hooligans, forces them to purchase Straw Hat merchandise, and burns Shanks' flag.
- Sai arc: Don Sai returns to and jilts his fiancee, Ooklicia, who beats him and storms off in a huff; this leaves him free to marry Baby 5.
- Ideo arc: Ideo and his crewmates stumble on an island which hosts a long-running war between longarms and longlegs; they decline to take sides and sail away, telling the citizens to resolve their differences.
- Leo arc: Leo and the Tontattas prove invaluable in reconstructing Dressrosa and are rewarded with the pirate ship Usoland; later, they serve as security for King Riku during the Reverie.
- Hajrudin arc: Hajrudin resigns from Buggy's Delivery and the New Giant Pirates are immediately put on Buggy's hit list.
- Orlumbus arc: Orlumbus submits his resignation as the official adventurer of the Standing Kingdom and steals a 56-ship fleet, but otherwise proves to be a generous, organized pirate.
- Side story: Reformed, Bellamy arrives in the Village of Dyed Goods and becomes a master artist.

== Gang Bege's Oh My Family ==
Gang Bege's Oh My Family
Timing	After: Giving Big Mom the wedding cake
Timing	Before: Wano
Parts	37 (ch. 948–994)
Key characters	Bege, Chiffon, Lola, Gotti, Pound

Bege and Chiffon escape on Tarte 25 and depart for Thriller Bark, seeking her sister Lola. Making a detour around the Red Line, they learn Lola is headed to Dressrosa; there, they follow a trail of kisses to Kyuin, the factory manager. The Germ Pirates attack, but Bege efficiently defeats them. Meanwhile, Lola is arrested at the salon and Gotti sets off in pursuit, mistaking her from Chiffon; he succeeds and frees her from the Navy, receiving a kiss and later, a proposal. Lola and Chiffon are reunited.

Offshore, the Tontattas on Usoland find Tarte 21 adrift with Pound passed out on board. After running from the Navy, the two sisters meet Pound at the port; he confesses to being their father and they flee from him. He swims after them and shows a locket as proof; the trio share their first hug. Gotti and Lola are wed as they continue to dodge the Navy.

== Germa 66's Ahh ... An Emotionless Excursion ==
Germa 66's Ahh ... An Emotionless Excursion
Timing	After: Defeating Smoothie and Daifuku
Timing	Before: Egghead Island
Parts	37 (ch. 1035–1078)
Key characters	Germa 66, Caesar
Animated as	Partially in (S21:1093 & 1114)

Germa 66 manage to escape, but Niji and Yonji have been captured; in Chocolat Town, Pudding strikes the brothers for bullying Sanji. They are taken to Whole Cake Island and prepared for dissection, but the book is burned, freeing them instead. Ichiji and Reiju pursue their brothers; the siblings' escape is delayed by Oven and Katakuri, but they are saved and joined by Caesar, who unleashes a hallucination gas. Later, Pudding is abducted by Kuzan and Van Augur.

When the Vinsmoke siblings return to Germa 66 with Caesar, he renews his feud with Judge; in a flashback to their time together with Vegapunk, Queen, and Stussy in MADS, Vegapunk is the obvious genius of the group while the other men would routinely fight over who was second. Back in the present, they call a truce after realizing they can make common cause against Vegapunk, forming Neo MADS.

== Ogre Child Yamato's Golden Harvest Surrogate Pilgrimage ==
Ogre Child Yamato's Golden Harvest Surrogate Pilgrimage
Timing	After: Kaido's defeat (Onigashima)
Timing	Before: ?
Parts	43 (ch. 1109–1162)
Key characters	Yamato, samurai of Wano

After Onigashima sinks, Yamato asks Momonosuke for permission to journey around Wano, as Oden did. Kinemon passes on a task to place Yasuie's sword at Enma Shrine in Hakumai. Hiyori, Otoko, and Otsuru give supplies to Yamato, who seeks the blessing of Cat Viper and Hyogoro. In Kibi, the children pelt Yamato with rocks because they hate Kaido; Denjiro, the Daimyo of Kibi, catches them and forces them to eat oden together with Yamato as a "punishment".

Enroute to Kuri, Yamato prevents an abduction and learns that Minatomo, the foreman supervising the rebuilding of Oden's castle, has gone missing, along with the waitresses of a soba shop. Daimyo Dogstorm is troubled. In Amigasa Village, Yamato watches Otama train diligently under Shinobu; during a nap, Yamato's sword is stolen, and Speed, Otama, and Komachiyo pursue the suspect to Udon. Holdem seizes Otama, but she beats him and they arrive at a mysterious hidden base where they find Who's-Who, who has masterminded the kidnappings and just captured Page One and Ulti. Yamato frees all the kidnapped captives and Ulti vows to be Yamato's lifelong retainer. Raizo, the Daimyo of Udon, thanks Yamato with a feast before departing for Hakumai.

At Hakumai, Yamato completes the pilgrimage to Enma Shrine, delives an Amigasa hat from Otama to Kawamatsu, and participates in a sumo tournament, throwing Urashima's older brother Sukune out of the ring. Moving on to Ringo, Yamato reunites with Daimyo Kikunojo and Boss Ocho; there Yamato pays tribute to Kozuki Moria, a hero who was born in the West Blue but raised in Ringo, where he had resisted Kaido to protect his village. Yamato, Page One, and Ulti return in triumph to the Flower Capital.
