= One Piece =

Japanese manga series by Eiichiro Oda

- 61st tankōbon volume cover, featuring Monkey D. Luffy (center) and the Straw Hats
- Genre: Adventure; Comedy drama; Science fantasy
- Manga
- Written by: Eiichiro Oda
- Published by: Shueisha
- English publisher: AUS: Madman Entertainment; NA/UK: Viz Media
- Imprint: Jump Comics
- Magazine: Weekly Shōnen Jump
- English magazine: NA: Shonen Jump; Weekly Shonen Jump
- Original run: July 22, 1997 – present
- Volumes: 115
- Anime television series
- One Piece (1999–present); The One Piece (2027)
- Media franchise
- List of One Piece media; List of One Piece films; One Piece live action series; List of One Piece video games; Music of One Piece
- icon

One Piece (stylized in all caps) is a Japanese manga series written and illustrated by Eiichiro Oda. It follows the adventures of Monkey D. Luffy and his crew, the Straw Hats, as he searches for the legendary treasure known as the "One Piece" to become the next King of the Pirates. The manga has been serialized in Shueisha's shōnen manga magazine Weekly Shōnen Jump since July 1997, with its chapters compiled in 115 tankōbon volumes as of July 2026. It was licensed for an English-language release in North America and the United Kingdom by Viz Media and in Australia by Madman Entertainment.

Becoming a media franchise, it has been adapted into a festival film by Production I.G, and an anime series by Toei Animation, which premiered in October 1999. Additionally, Toei has developed 14 animated feature films and one original video animation (OVA). Several companies have developed various types of merchandising and media, such as a trading card game and video games. Netflix released a live-action TV series in 2023. Another anime series produced by Wit Studio is scheduled to premiere in 2027.

One Piece has received praise for its storytelling, expansive worldbuilding, art, characterization, and humor. It is regarded by critics and readers as one of the greatest manga series of all time. By March 2026, it had over 600 million copies in circulation worldwide, making it the best-selling comic series in volume format and the best-selling manga series ever. It holds various publishing records, including the highest initial print run for any book in Japan. In 2015 and 2022, it set the Guinness World Record for "most copies published for the same comic book series by a single author". It was the best-selling manga for 11 consecutive years (2008–2018) and remains the only series with over 3 million initial prints for over ten years, as well as the only one with every of its over 100 published tankōbon volumes selling over 1 million copies. Since 2008, it has consistently ranked first in Oricon's weekly comic chart.

== Synopsis ==
=== Setting ===
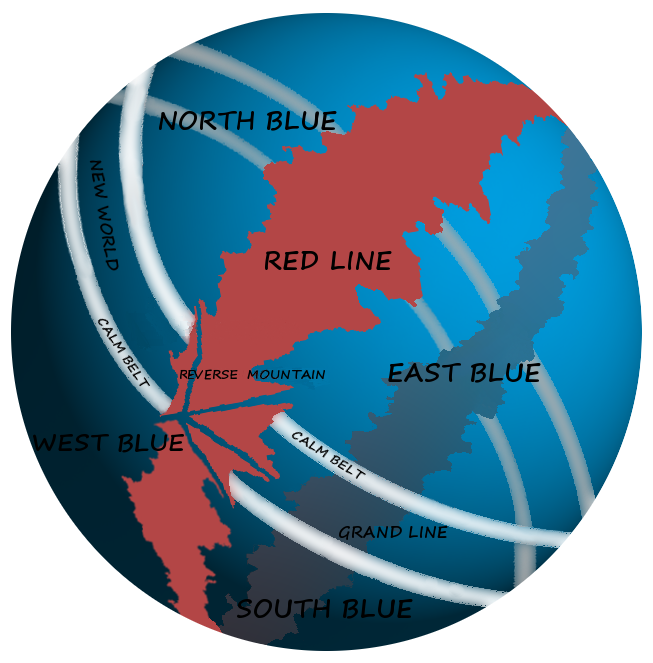
One Piece's Blue Planet

Flag of the World Government

One Piece is set on the Blue Planet, populated by humans and other races such as dwarves (more akin to fairies in size), giants (which also includes the ancient giants and the occasional artificial giants), merfolk, fish-men, long-limbed tribes, long-necked people known as the Snakeneck Tribe, and animal people known as "Minks", as well as the assorted hybrids of different races and artificial races. The Blue Planet is governed by an authoritarian intercontinental organization known as the World Government, consisting of dozens of member countries. The Navy is the military branch of the World Government that protects the known seas from pirates and other criminals. Cipher Pol acts as the World Government's secret police. While pirates are major opponents of the Government, the ones who directly challenge their rule are the Revolutionary Army who seek to overthrow them. The central tension of the series pits the World Government and their forces, such as the Marines, against pirates.

The series regularly emphasizes moral ambiguity over the label "pirate", which includes morally bankrupt individuals motivated by selfish gains, but also any individuals who do not submit to the World Government's authoritarian—and often morally ambiguous—rule. The One Piece world also has supernatural objects such as Devil Fruits, (Note: Devil Fruits (悪魔の実, Akuma no Mi)) which are mysterious fruits that grant consumers transformative powers at the cost of becoming weakened in bodies of water, causing users to lose the ability to swim. Another supernatural power is Haki, (Note: Haki (覇気)) which is an innate ability that grants its users enhanced observation and fighting abilities based on their willpower. It is one of the only effective methods of inflicting bodily harm on certain Devil Fruit users.

The surface of the Blue Planet mainly consists of the Blue Sea, two vast oceans divided by a massive continental mountain range called the Red Line, which runs along what would be the Prime Meridian on Earth. (Note: Red Line (赤い土の大陸(レッドライン), Reddo Rain)) Within the oceans is a second global phenomenon known as the Grand Line, (Note: Grand Line (偉大なる航路(グランドライン), Gurando Rain)) which is a sea that runs perpendicular to the Red Line, along what would be the equator on Earth and is bounded by the Calm Belt, (Note: Calm Belt (凪の帯(カームベルト), Kāmu Beruto)) strips of calm ocean infested with huge ship-eating monsters shaped like serpents known as Sea Kings. (Note: Sea Kings (海王類, Kaiō-rui)) These geographical barriers divide the world into four seas: North Blue, (Note: North Blue (北の海(ノースブルー), Nōsu Burū)) East Blue, (Note: East Blue (東の海(イーストブルー), Īsuto Burū)) West Blue, (Note: West Blue (西の海(ウエストブルー), Uesuto Burū)) and South Blue. (Note: South Blue (南の海(サウスブルー), Sausu Burū)) Passage between the four seas, and the Grand Line, is therefore difficult. Unique and mystical features enable transport between the seas, such as the use of Sea Prism Stone (Note: Sea Prism Stone (海楼石, Kairōseki; Seastone)) employed by government ships to mask their presence as they traverse the Calm Belt, or the Reverse Mountain (Note: Reverse Mountain (リヴァース・マウンテン, Rivāsu Maunten)) where water from the four seas flows uphill before merging into a rapidly flowing and dangerous canal that enters the Grand Line. The Grand Line itself is split into two separate halves, with the Red Line being between Paradise (Note: Paradise (楽園(パラダイス), Paradaisu)) and the New World. (Note: New World (新世界, Shinsekai))

=== Premise ===
One Piece story arcs
| Arc | Manga | | Toei Anime | | Live | |
| Arc | Chp. | Vol. | S | Ep. | S | Ep. |
East Blue
| Romance Dawn | 1–7 | 1 | S1 | 1–4 | S1 | 1 |
| Orange Town | 8–21 | 1–4 | S1 | 5–8 | S1 | 2 |
| Defeat Him! The Pirate Ganzack | —N/a | | OVA | | | |
| Syrup Village | 22–41 | 3–5 | S1 | 9–18 | S1 | 3–4 |
| Baratie | 42–68 | 5–8 | S1 | 19–30 | S1 | 5–8 |
| Arlong Park | 69–95 | 8–11 | S1 | 31–44 | S1 | 5–8 |
| Buggy's Crew: After the Battle! | 35–75 (covers) | 4–9 | S1 | 46–47 | | |
| Loguetown | 96–100 | 11–12 | S1 | 45; 48–53 | S2 | 9 |
| Warship Island | —N/a | | S1 | 54–61 | | |
Alabasta / Baroque Works
| Reverse Mountain / Into the Grand Line | 101–105 | 12 | S2 | 62–63 | S2 | 10 |
| Whiskey Peak | 106–114 | 12–13 | S2 | 64–67 | S2 | 11 |
| Koby and Helmeppo's Chronicle of Toil | 83–119 (covers) | 10–14 | S2 | 68–69 | | |
| Little Garden | 115–129 | 13–15 | S2 | 70–77 | S2 | 12–13 |
| Drum Island | 130–154 | 15–17 | S3 | 78–91 | S2 | 14–16 |
| Django's Dance Paradise | 126–172 (covers) | 14–19 | —N/a | | | |
| Alabasta | 155–217 | 17–24 | S3/ S4 | 92–130 | | |
| Dreams! | —N/a | | S5 | 131–135 | | |
Sky Island
| Goat Island / The Zenny Pirate Crew Sortie! | —N/a | | S5 | 136–138 | | |
| Ruluka Island / Beyond the Rainbow | —N/a | | S5 | 139–143 | | |
| Hachi's Walk on the Sea Floor | 182–228 (covers) | 20–25 | —N/a | | | |
| Jaya | 218–236 | 24–25 | S6 | 144–152 | | |
| Skypiea | 237–302 | 26–32 | S6 | 153–195 | | |
| Wapol's Omnivorous Rampage | 236–262 (covers) | 25–28 | —N/a | | | |
| G-8 / The Naval Fortress | —N/a | | S7 | 196–206 | | |
Water 7
| Ace's Great Search for Blackbeard | 272–305 (covers) | 29–32 | —N/a | | | |
| Long Ring Long Land / The Foxy Pirate Crew | 303–321 | 32–34 | S7 | 207–219 | | |
| Gedatsu's Unexpected Life on the Blue Sea | 314–348 (covers) | 33–37 | —N/a | | | |
| Ocean's Dream | —N/a | | S7 | 220–224 | | |
| Foxy's Return | —N/a | | S7 | 225–228 | | |
| Water 7 | 322–374 | 34–39 | S8 | 229–263 | | |
| Enies Lobby | 375–441 | 39–46 | S9 | 264–290; 293–302; 304–325 | | |
| Miss Goldenweek's Big Plan, A Baroque Reunion | 359–413 (covers) | 38–43 | —N/a | | | |
| Boss Luffy Historical Special | —N/a | | S9 | 291–292; 303 | | |
| Boss Luffy Historical Special | —N/a | | S11 | 406–407 | | |
Thriller Bark
| Ice Hunter | —N/a | | S9 | 326–335 | | |
| Chopper Man | —N/a | | S9 | 336 | | |
| Eneru's Great Space Mission | 428–474 (covers) | 44–49 | —N/a | | | |
| Thriller Bark | 442–489 | 46–50 | S10 | 337–381 | | |
| CP9's Independent Report | 491–528 (covers) | 50–54 | —N/a | | | |
| Spa Island | —N/a | | S11 | 382–384 | | |
| Romance Dawn (one-shot, version 1) | Akamaru Jump | | OVA | | | |
Summit War
| Sabaody Archipelago | 490–513 | 50–53 | S11 | 385–405 | | |
| Amazon Lily / Island of Women | 514–524 | 53–54 | S12 | 408–417 | | |
| The Friends' Whereabouts | 543–560 (covers) | 56–57 | S12 | 418–421 | | |
| The Friends' Whereabouts | 543–560 (covers) | 56–57 | S13 | 453–456 | | |
| Impel Down | 525–549 | 54–56 | S13/ S14 | 422–425; 430–452; 457-458 | | |
| Little East Blue (Strong World) | —N/a | | S13 | 426–429 | | |
| Marineford / Paramount War | 550–597 | 56–61 | S14 | 459–491; 493–516 | | |
| Toriko × One Piece | —N/a | | S14 | 492 | | |
Fish-Man Island / New World
| Return to Sabaody | 598–602 | 61 | S15 | 517–522 | | |
| Fish-Man Island | 603–653 | 61–66 | S15 | 523–541; 543–574 | | |
| Decks of the World | 613–668 (covers) | 62–68 | —N/a | | | |
| Toriko × One Piece | —N/a | | S15 | 542 | | |
Dressrosa
| Z's Ambition (Z) | —N/a | | S15 | 575–578 | | |
| Punk Hazard | 654–699 | 66–70 | S16 | 579–589; 591–625 | | |
| Caribou's New World Kee Hee Hee | 674–731 (covers) | 68–73 | S20 | 921 | | |
| Toriko × One Piece × Dragon Ball Z | —N/a | | S16 | 590 | | |
| Caesar Retrieval | —N/a | | S16 | 626–628 | | |
| Dressrosa | 700–801 | 70–80 | S17 | 629–746 | | |
| The Solitary Journey of Jimbei, First Son of the Sea | 751–785 (covers) | 75–78 | —N/a | | | |
Whole Cake Island
| Silver Mine (Gold) | —N/a | | S18 | 747–750 | | |
| Zou | 802–822 | 80–82 | S18 | 751–779 | | |
| Decks of the World, 500-Million-Man Arc | 805–838 (covers) | 80–83 | —N/a | | | |
| Marine Rookie | —N/a | | S18 | 780–782 | | |
| Whole Cake Island | 823–908 | 82–90 | S19 | 783–891 | | |
| The Saga of the Self-Proclaimed Straw Hat Fleet | 864–919 (covers) | 86–91 | —N/a | | | |
Land of Wano
| Germa 66's Ahh ... An Emotionless Excursion | 1035–1078 (covers) | 102–107 | —N/a | | | |
| Land of Wano, Act One | 909–924 | 90–92 | S20 | 892–894; 897–906; 908–916 | | |
| Cidre Guild (Stampede) | —N/a | | S20 | 895–896 | | |
| Romance Dawn (one-shot, version 2) | Wanted! | | S20 | 907 | | |
| Land of Wano, Act Two | 925–955 | 92–94 | S20 | 917–956 | | |
| Gang Bege's Oh My Family | 948–994 (covers) | 94–98 | —N/a | | | |
| Land of Wano, Act Three | 956–1057 | 95–105 | S20 | 957–1028; 1031–1088 | | |
| Uta's Past (Red) | —N/a | | S20 | 1029–1030 | | |
Egghead / Elbaph
| Egghead | 1058–1125 | 105–111 | S21 | 1089–1155 | | |
| Ogre Child Yamato's Golden Harvest Surrogate Pilgrimage | 1109–1162 (covers) | 109–114 | —N/a | | | |
| Elbaph | 1126–present | 111–TBA | S22 | 1156–present | | |

The series focuses on Monkey D. Luffy, a young man whose body has the properties of rubber after unintentionally eating the Gum-Gum Fruit—who sets off on a journey from the East Blue Sea to find the deceased King of the Pirates Gold Roger's ultimate treasure known as the "One Piece", and take over his prior title. Luffy sets sail as captain of the Straw Hat Pirates, (Note: Straw Hat Pirates (麦わら海賊団, Mugiwara Kaizoku-dan)) and is joined by Roronoa Zoro, a swordsman and former bounty hunter; Nami, a money-obsessed thief and navigator; Usopp, a sniper and compulsive liar; and Sanji, an amorous but chivalrous cook. They acquire a ship, the Going Merry (Note: Going Merry (ゴーイング・メリー号, Gōingu Merī-gō))—later replaced by the Thousand Sunny (Note: Thousand Sunny (サウザンドサニー号, Sauzando Sanī-gō))—and engage in confrontations with notorious pirates. As Luffy and his crew set out on their adventures, others join the crew later in the series, including Tony Tony Chopper, an anthropomorphic reindeer doctor; Nico Robin, an archaeologist possessing the unique ability to decipher Poneglyphs; Franky, a cyborg shipwright; Brook, a skeleton musician and swordsman; and Jimbei, a whale shark-type fish-man and former member of the Seven Warlords of the Sea who becomes their helmsman. Together, they encounter other pirates, bounty hunters, criminal organizations, revolutionaries, secret agents, scientists, soldiers of both the World Government and the Four Emperors, and various other friends and foes, as they sail the seas in pursuit of their dreams.

== Production ==
=== Concept and creation ===
Eiichiro Oda's interest in pirates began in his childhood, watching the animated series Vicky the Viking, which made him want to draw a manga series revolving around pirates. The reading of pirate biographies influenced Oda to incorporate the characteristics of real-life pirates into many of the characters of One Piece; for example, the character Marshall D. Teach is based on and named after the historical pirate Edward "Blackbeard" Teach. Apart from the history of piracy, Oda's biggest influence is Akira Toriyama and his series Dragon Ball, which is one of his favorite manga.

While working as an assistant to Nobuhiro Watsuki, Oda began writing One Piece in 1996. It started as two one-shot stories entitled Romance Dawn—which would later be used as the title for One Piece's first chapter and volume. They both featured the character of Luffy and included elements that would appear later in the main series. The first of these short stories was published in August 1996 in Shueisha's Akamaru Jump, and reprinted in 2002 in the One Piece Red guidebook. The second was published in the 41st issue of Weekly Shōnen Jump in September 1996, and reprinted in 1998 in Oda's short story collection, Wanted! In an interview with TBS, Takanori Asada, the original editor of One Piece, revealed that the manga was rejected by Weekly Shōnen Jump three times before they agreed to publish the series. Kazuhiko Torishima, then the magazine's editor-in-chief, explained that they debated for two hours on whether or not to serialize One Piece. Although acknowledging that it had potential, he was one of those against the work because it was "incomplete". Torishima ultimately approved serialization due to Asada being so "annoyingly earnest" that another editor suggested both Oda and Asada would be crushed if it was rejected at that time.

=== Development ===
Oda's primary inspiration for the concept of Devil Fruits was Doraemon; the Fruits' abilities and uses reflect Oda's daily life and his personal fantasies, similar to that of Doraemon's gadgets, such as the Gum-Gum Fruit being inspired by Oda's laziness. When designing the outward appearance of Devil Fruits, Oda would think of something that would fulfill a human desire; he added that he does not see why he would draw a Devil Fruit unless the fruit's appearance would entice one to eat it. The names of many special attacks, as well as other concepts in the manga, consist of a form of punning in which phrases written in kanji are paired with an idiosyncratic reading. The names of some characters' techniques are often mixed with other languages, and the names of several of Zoro's sword techniques are designed as jokes; they look fearsome when read by sight but sound like kinds of food when read aloud. For example, Zoro's signature move is Onigiri, which is written as demon cut but is pronounced the same as rice ball in Japanese. Eisaku Inoue, an animation director at Toei Animation, noted that these kanji readings were not used in the anime series since they "might have cut down the laughs by about half". Nevertheless, Konosuke Uda, fellow director, said that he believes that the creators "made the anime pretty close to the manga".

Oda was "sensitive" about how his work would be translated. In many instances, the English version of the One Piece manga uses one onomatopoeia for multiple onomatopoeiae used in the Japanese version. For instance, "saaa" (the sound of light rain, close to a mist) and "zaaa" (the sound of pouring rain) are both translated as "fshhhhhhh". Unlike other manga artists, Oda draws everything that moves himself to create a consistent look while leaving his staff to draw the backgrounds based on sketches he had drawn. This workload forces him to keep tight production rates, typically starting from five in the morning until two in the morning the next day, with short breaks only for meals. Oda's work program includes the first three days of the week dedicated to the writing of the storyboard and the remaining time for the definitive inking of the boards and the possible colouring.

When a reader asked who Nami was in love with, Oda replied that there would hardly be any romantic relationships within Luffy's crew, explaining that he deliberately avoids including them in One Piece since the series is a shōnen manga, targeted towards adolescent boys, who are unlikely to be interested in romantic pairings.

=== Conclusion ===
In 2006, Oda stated that he originally planned One Piece to last five years and that he had already planned the ending. However, he found it would take longer than he had expected as Oda realized that he liked the story too much to end it in that period of time. In 2016, nineteen years after the manga's debut, the author stated that the story was approximately 65% complete. In July 2018, on the occasion of the twenty-first anniversary of One Piece, Oda said that the manga had reached 80% of the plot. In a television special aired in Japan in January 2019, Oda said that One Piece was on its way to its conclusion, but that it would exceed the 100th volume, also commenting that he would be willing to change the ending if the fans were to be able to predict it. Oda noted that the titular One Piece is a physical object; when asked if the titular treasure is "family bonds", Oda noted that the ending of The Wizard of Oz, where the reward of adventure is the journey itself, is a cliché he wants to avoid. In August 2019, Oda said that, according to his predictions, the manga would end in five years. However, Oda stated that the ending remained consistent from its initial conception. In August 2020, Shueisha announced in the year's 35th issue of Weekly Shōnen Jump that One Piece was "headed toward the upcoming final saga". On January 4, 2021, One Piece reached its thousandth chapter. In June 2022, Oda announced that the manga would enter a one-month break to prepare for its 25th anniversary and its final saga, set to begin with the release of chapter 1054.

In March 2026, the series' official YouTube account shared a video of Oda making final statements about the truth behind the treasure and what awaits Luffy. Oda then locked the paper inside a treasure box and sent it to the bottom of the ocean, where it will remain until the story is finished. However, multiple fans have since started planning an attempt to retrieve the treasure box early.

== Media ==
=== Manga ===
Written and illustrated by Eiichiro Oda, One Piece has been serialized by Shueisha in the shōnen manga anthology Weekly Shōnen Jump since July 22, 1997. Shueisha has collected its chapters into individual tankōbon volumes, with the first released on December 24, 1997. By July 3, 2026, a total of 115 volumes have been released.

Viz Media started publishing the manga in English through its Shonen Jump manga anthology in November 2002 and started releasing the collected volumes on June 30, 2003. In 2009, Viz announced the release of five volumes per month during the first half of 2010 to catch up with the serialization in Japan. Following the discontinuation of the print Shonen Jump, Viz began releasing One Piece chapterwise in its digital successor Weekly Shonen Jump on January 30, 2012. After the cancellation of the digital Weekly Shonen Jump in December 2018, Viz Media started simultaneously publishing One Piece through its Shonen Jump service, and by Shueisha through Manga Plus, in January 2019.

In the United Kingdom, the volumes were published by Gollancz Manga, starting in March 2006, until Viz Media took it over after the fourteenth volume. In Australia and New Zealand, the English volumes have been distributed by Madman Entertainment since November 2008.

==== Spin-offs and crossovers ====
Oda teamed up with Akira Toriyama to create a single crossover of One Piece and Toriyama's Dragon Ball series. Entitled Cross Epoch, the one-shot was published in the December 25, 2006, issue of Weekly Shōnen Jump and the April 2011 issue of the English Shonen Jump. Oda collaborated with Mitsutoshi Shimabukuro, author of Toriko, for a crossover one-shot of their series titled Taste of the Devil Fruit (実食! 悪魔の実!!, Jitsushoku! Akuma no Mi!!; lit. 'The True Food! Devil Fruit!!'), published in Weekly Shōnen Jump on April 4, 2011. The spin-off series One Piece Party (ワンピースパーティー, Wan Pīsu Pātī), written by Ei Andō in a chibi art style, began serialization in Saikyō Jump on December 5, 2011. Its final chapter was published on Shōnen Jump+ on February 2, 2021.

=== Anime ===
==== Festival films and original video animation ====
One Piece: Defeat Him! The Pirate Ganzack! was produced by Production I.G for the 1998 Jump Super Anime Tour and was directed by Gorō Taniguchi. The plot follows Luffy, Nami, and Zoro after they are attacked by a sea monster that destroys their boat and separates them. Luffy is found on an island beach, where he saves a little girl, Medaka, from two pirates. All the villagers, including Medaka's father, have been abducted by the pirate Ganzack and his crew and forced into labour. After hearing that Ganzack also stole all the food, Luffy and Zoro rush out to retrieve it. As they fight the pirates, one of them kidnaps Medaka. A fight ensues between Luffy and Ganzack, ending with Luffy's capture. Meanwhile, Zoro is forced to give up after a threat is made to kill all the villagers. They rise against Ganzack, and while the islanders and pirates fight, Nami frees the three captives. Ganzack defeats the rebellion and reveals his armoured battleship. The Straw Hat Pirates are forced to fight Ganzack once more to prevent him from destroying the island.

A second film, One Piece: Romance Dawn Story, was produced by Toei Animation in July 2008 for the Jump Super Anime Tour. It is 34 minutes in length and based on the first version of Romance Dawn. It includes the Straw Hat Pirates up to Brook and their second ship, the Thousand Sunny. In search for food for his crew, Luffy arrives at a port after defeating a pirate named Crescent Moon Gally on the way. There he meets a girl named Silk, who was abandoned by attacking pirates as a baby and raised by the mayor. Her upbringing causes her to value the town as her "treasure". The villagers mistake Luffy for Gally and capture him just as the real Gally returns. Gally throws Luffy in the water and plans to destroy the town, but Silk saves him and Luffy pursues Gally. His crew arrives to help him, and with their help, he recovers the treasure for the town, acquires food, and destroys Gally's ship. The film was later released as a triple feature DVD with Dragon Ball: Yo! Son Goku and His Friends Return!! and Tegami Bachi: Light and Blue Night, that was available only through a mail-in offer exclusively to Japanese residents.

The One Piece Film Strong World: Episode 0 original video animation (OVA) adapts the manga's special "Chapter 0", which showcases events before and after the death of Roger. It received a limited release of three thousand DVDs as a collaboration with the House Foods brand.

==== 1999 series ====
An anime television series adaptation produced by Toei Animation premiered on Fuji Television on October 20, 1999; the series reached its 1,000th episode in November 2021.

===== Theatrical films =====
Fourteen animated theatrical One Piece films produced by Toei Animation have been released. The films are typically released in March to coincide with the spring vacation of Japanese schools. They feature self-contained, completely original plots, or alternate retellings of story arcs with animation of a higher quality than that of the regular anime series. The first three films were typically double features paired up with other anime films and were thus usually an hour or less in length. The films themselves offer contradictions in both chronology and design that make them incompatible with a single continuity. Funimation has licensed the eighth, tenth, and twelfth films for release in North America, and these films have received in-house dubs by the company.

==== 2027 series ====
In December 2023 at the Jump Festa '24 event, it was announced that Wit Studio would be producing an original net animation (ONA) series remake for Netflix, starting from the East Blue story arc, to commemorate the 25th anniversary of the original anime series. The new series will be titled The One Piece. It will be directed by Masashi Koizuka, with Hideaki Abe serving as assistant director, and Kyoji Asano and Takatoshi Honda as character designers and chief animation directors. Yasuhiro Kajino will be in charge of the image board and creature design, and Eri Taguchi will be in charge of prop design. Taku Kishimoto will be in charge of the series scripts, and Ken Imaizumi and Shuhei Fukuda will serve as action animators. Tomonori Kuroda will be the art director, and Ryōma Kawamura will be the animation producer. The series is scheduled to premiere its first seven-episode season in February 2027.

=== Live-action series ===
On July 21, 2017, Weekly Shōnen Jump editor-in-chief Hiroyuki Nakano announced that Tomorrow Studios (a partnership between Marty Adelstein and ITV Studios) and Shueisha would commence production of an American live-action television adaptation of the One Piece manga series as part of the series' 20th anniversary celebrations. Oda served as executive producer for the series alongside Tomorrow Studios CEO Adelstein and Becky Clements. The series would reportedly begin with the East Blue arc.

In January 2020, Oda revealed that Netflix ordered a first season consisting of ten episodes. On May 19, 2020, producer Marty Adelstein revealed during an interview with SyFy Wire, that the series was originally set to begin filming in Cape Town sometime around August, but has since been delayed to around September due to the COVID-19 pandemic. He also revealed that, during the same interview, all ten scripts had been written for the series and they were set to begin casting sometime in June. However, executive producer Matt Owens stated in September 2020 that casting had not yet commenced.

In March 2021, production started up again with showrunner Steven Maeda revealing that the series codename was Project Roger. In November 2021, it was announced that the main cast of the series consisted of Iñaki Godoy as Monkey D. Luffy, Mackenyu as Roronoa Zoro, Emily Rudd as Nami, Jacob Romero Gibson as Usopp and Taz Skylar as Sanji. In March 2022, Netflix added Morgan Davies as Koby, Ilia Isorelýs Paulino as Alvida, Aidan Scott as Helmeppo, Jeff Ward as Buggy, McKinley Belcher III as Arlong, Vincent Regan as Garp and Peter Gadiot as Shanks to the cast in recurring roles.

The series premiered on August 31, 2023, and was positively received by both fans and critics. In September 2023, it was announced that the series was renewed for a second season. Titled One Piece: Into the Grand Line, the full season was released on Netflix on March 10, 2026, and the first two episodes were screened in over 200 theaters in Canada, the United States, and Japan on the same day. A third season was announced in August 2025.

=== Video games ===
The One Piece franchise has been adapted into multiple video games published by subsidiaries of Bandai and later as part of Bandai Namco Entertainment. The games have been released on a variety of video game, handheld consoles, and mobile devices. The video games feature role-playing games, and fighting games, such as the titles of the Grand Battle! meta-series. The series debuted on July 19, 2000, with From TV Animation – One Piece: Become the Pirate King!. Over forty games have been produced based on the franchise. Additionally, One Piece characters and settings have appeared in various Shonen Jump crossover games, such as Battle Stadium D.O.N, Jump Super Stars, Jump Ultimate Stars, J-Stars Victory VS and Jump Force. Characters from the series have also appeared in video games such as Roblox and Fortnite.

=== Music ===
Music soundtracks have been released that are based on songs that premiered in the series. Kohei Tanaka and Shiro Hamaguchi composed the score for One Piece. Various theme songs and character songs were released on a total of 51 singles. Eight compilation albums and seventeen soundtrack CDs have been released featuring songs and themes that were introduced in the series. On August 11, 2019, it was announced that the musical group Sakuramen is collaborating with Kohei Tanaka to compose music for the anime's "Wano Country" story arc.

=== Light novels ===
A series of light novels was published based on the first festival film, certain episodes of the anime television series, and all but the first feature film. They feature artwork by Oda and are written by Tatsuya Hamasaki. The first of these novels, One Piece: Defeat The Pirate Ganzak! was released on June 3, 1999. One Piece: Logue Town Chapter followed on July 17, 2000, as an adaptation of the anime television series' Logue Town story arc. The first feature film to be adapted was Clockwork Island Adventure on March 19, 2001. The second, and so far last, light novel adaptation of an anime television series arc, One Piece: Thousand-year Dragon Legend, was published on December 25, 2001. The adaptation of Chopper's Kingdom on the Island of Strange Animals was released on March 22, 2002, and that of Dead End Adventure on March 10, 2003. Curse of the Sacred Sword followed on March 22, 2004, and Baron Omatsuri and the Secret Island on March 14, 2005. The light novel of The Giant Mechanical Soldier of Karakuri Castle was released on March 6, 2006, and that of The Desert Princess and the Pirates: Adventures in Alabasta on March 7, 2007. A novel adaptation of Episodes of Chopper Plus: Bloom in the Winter, Miracle Cherry Blossom was released on February 25, 2008.

=== Art and guidebooks ===
Five art books and five guidebooks for the One Piece series have been released. The first art book, One Piece: Color Walk 1, released June 2001, was also released in English by Viz Media on November 8, 2005. A second art book, One Piece: Color Walk 2, was released on November 4, 2003; and One Piece: Color Walk 3 – Lion the third art book, was released January 5, 2006. The fourth art book, subtitled Eagle, was released on March 4, 2010, and One Piece: Shark, the fifth art book, was released on December 3, 2010.

The first guidebook One Piece: Red – Grand Characters was released on March 2, 2002. The second, One Piece: Blue – Grand Data File, followed on August 2, 2002. The third guidebook, One Piece: Yellow – Grand Elements, was released on April 4, 2007, and the fourth, One Piece: Green – Secret Pieces, followed on November 4, 2010. An anime guidebook, One Piece: Rainbow!, was released on May 1, 2007, and covers the first eight years of the TV anime.

=== Other media ===
Other One Piece media include a trading card game by Bandai called One Piece CCG and a drama CD centering on the character of Nefertari Vivi released by Avex Trax on December 26, 2002. In July 2022, Bandai released a new trading card game in Japan, One Piece Card Game, with a global release later that year. A Hello Kitty-inspired Chopper was used for several pieces of merchandise as a collaboration between One Piece and Hello Kitty. A kabuki play inspired by One Piece, Super Kabuki II: One Piece, ran at Tokyo's Shinbashi Enbujō throughout October and November 2015.

An event called "One Piece Premier Show" debuted at Universal Studios Japan in 2007. The event has been held at the same location every year since 2010. (except in 2020, when the event was canceled due to the COVID-19 pandemic). By 2018, the event has attracted over 1 million visitors. The Baratie restaurant, modeled after the restaurant of the same name in the manga, opened in June 2013 at the Fuji Television headquarters. An indoor theme park located inside the Tokyo Tower called the Tokyo One Piece Tower, which includes some attractions, shops and restaurants, opened on March 13, 2015. From April 25 to May 18, 2025, Universal Studios Hollywood opened the One Piece: Grand Pirate Gathering attraction based on the series, as part of the Fan Fest Nights event.

One Piece is the first-ever manga series to hold a "Dome Tour", in which events were held from March 25–27, 2011, at the Kyocera Dome in Osaka, and from April 27 – May 1 of the same year at the Tokyo Dome. In 2014, the first One Piece exhibition in South Korea was held at the War Memorial of Korea, and the second exhibition in Hongik Daehango Art Center. In 2015, a One Piece trompe-l'œil exhibition was held at the Hong Kong 3D Museum.

One Piece on Ice: Episode of Alabaster premiered on August 11, 2023, in Yokohama, starring two-time reigning world champion Shoma Uno in the lead role of Monkey D. Luffy and junior world champion Marin Honda as Princess Vivi. Other cast members included Four Continents champion Nobunari Oda, Kazuki Tomono, Keijii Tanaka, Koshiro Shimada, and Rika Hongo.

On August 13, 2026, a collaboration was announced with the American animated series SpongeBob SquarePants for a McDonald's Happy Meal in multiple territories around the world. The promotion will be available during August 2026, though at different times depending on the region.

== Reception ==
=== Sales ===
One Piece is the best-selling manga series in history; in 2012, Oricon, a Japanese company that began its own annual manga sales ranking chart in 2008, reported that the series was the first to sell 100 million copies (the company does not report on sales figures before April 2008). The series had over 300 million copies in circulation by November 2013; over 440 million copies in circulation worldwide by May 2018; 460 million copies by December 2019; 470 million copies by April 2020; and 480 million copies in circulation in forty-three countries worldwide by February 2021. It reached 490 million copies in print worldwide by July 2021. By August 2022, the manga had reached 516.566 million copies in circulation worldwide. By March 2026, it had over 600 million copies in circulation worldwide. By 2004, the brand's merchandise had made more than $1 billion in retail sales in Japan.

One Piece was the best-selling manga series for eleven consecutive years from 2008 until 2018. In 2019, the manga did not top the chart for the first time in twelve years, ranking second in the annual manga sales ranking with over 10.1 million copies sold, although it remained as the best-selling manga by volume in its twelfth consecutive year. It was the third best-selling manga series in 2020, with over 7.7 million copies sold, while volumes 95–97 were the 23rd–25th best-selling manga volumes of 2020, behind the first twenty-two volumes of Demon Slayer: Kimetsu no Yaiba. In 2021, it was the sixth best-selling manga with over 7 million copies sold, while volumes 98, 99, and 100 were the sixth, eighth, and ninth best-selling manga volumes, respectively. It was the fourth best-selling manga series in 2022, with over 10.3 million copies sold; volumes 101–104 were among the 10 best-selling manga volumes of the year. It was the fifth best-selling manga series in the first half of 2023 (period between November 2022 and May 2023), with over 3.5 million copies sold, while volume 105 was the best-selling manga volume from the same period; volume 104 placed nineteenth. Volumes 105–107 were among the best-selling manga volumes of 2023. Volume 108 was Shueisha's highest first print run manga volume of 2023–2024 (period between April 2023 and March 2024), with 3.2 million copies printed. Volume 108 was the best-selling manga volume of 2024, with 1,552,215 copies sold, while volumes 109 and 110 placed third and sixth, respectively. Volume 111 was the best-selling manga volume of 2025, with 1,370,154 copies sold, while volumes 112 and 113 placed fourth and seventh, respectively. Volume 114 was the best-selling manga volume of the first half of 2026, with 1,006,359 copies sold.

Individual volumes of One Piece have broken publishing and sales records in Japan. In 2009, the 56th volume had a print run of 2.85 million, the highest initial print run of any manga by then. The 57th volume had a print run of 3 million in 2010, a record that was broken several times by subsequent volumes. The 60th volume had a first print run of 3.4 million and was the first book to sell over two million copies in its opening week on Oricon book rankings, and later became the first book to sell over three million copies in Oricon's history. In 2012, the 67th volume had an initial print run of 4.05 million, holding the record of the volume with the highest number of copies in the first print. One Piece is the only manga that had an initial print of volumes of above 3 million continuously for more than ten years. In May 2023, it was reported that each of the 105 volumes, published by then, had sold over 1 million copies. Additionally, One Piece is the only work whose volumes have ranked first every year in Oricon's weekly comic chart existence since 2008.

In the rankings introduced by Billboard Japan for 2026—which account for physical and digital sales, as well as library loans and social media popularity—the series appeared in several positions. In the Hot Manga chart, which ranks the top manga of the year, the 113th volume took the number one spot—ranking first in physical retail and seventh in e-book sales—while volumes 115 and 114 placed second and third, respectively. In the Reiwa Books chart—which lists the best books published during the Reiwa era—volume 113 secured fourth place, while volumes 115 and 114 ranked seventh and eighth, respectively. In the Book Hot 100, which ranks the top 100 books of the year, the 113th volume reached fourth place, with volumes 115 and 114 ranking eighth and ninth, respectively. Finally, in the Hot Shot Books chart—which tracks books experiencing the most significant commercial growth and rising popularity—volumes 115 and 114 placed fourth and sixth, respectively.

One Piece has also sold well in North America, charting on Publishers Weekly's list of best-selling comics for April/May 2007 and numerous times on The New York Times Manga Best Seller list. On ICv2's list of Top 25 Manga Properties Fall 2008 for North America, which is compiled by interviews with retailers and distributors, Nielsen BookScan's Top 20 Lists of graphic novels and ICv2's own analysis of information provided by Diamond Comic Distributors, One Piece came in fifteenth place. It rose to second place on their Top 25 Manga Properties Q3 2010 list. By August 2022, the manga has sold 2.9 million copies in print in North America (including single volumes and omnibus editions).

In France, One Piece is very popular and has been the best-selling manga since 2011, with over 31.80 million copies sold by August 2022. Its sales alone represented 8.5% of the French manga market by 2021. The first volume had sold more than 1 million copies in France by July 2021. The 100th volume had one of the biggest initial prints ever for a manga in the French market, selling 131,270 copies in just three days, the best-selling manga volume in a week in the country. The manga sold 6,011,536 copies in 2021. This amount represents almost 20% of the total sales in the country; almost one in five volumes of the series was sold in the year.

In Italy, One Piece had 18 million copies in circulation by April 2021, which represents around 22.5% of the series market outside Japan. In September 2021, the limited edition of the ninety-eighth volume ranked first in the best-selling books weekly ranking, marking the first time that a manga reached that achievement.

In Germany, One Piece is the second best-selling manga behind Dragon Ball. The manga has sold over 6.7 million copies in the country.

=== Critical response ===
Allen Divers of Anime News Network commented in 2003 that the art style One Piece employs "initially seems very cartoonish with much of the character designs showing more North American influence than that from its Japanese origins", adding that the "artwork and settings come across as timeless in their presentation". He also notes that the influence of Akira Toriyama (Dragon Ball) shines through in Oda's style of writing with its "huge epic battles punctuated by a lot of humor" and that, in One Piece, he "manages to share a rich tale without getting bogged down by overly complicated plots". Rebecca Silverman of the same site stated that one of the series' strengths is to "blend action, humor, and heavy fare together" and praised the art, but stated that the panels could get too crowded for easy reading. The website activeAnime describes the artwork in One Piece as "wonderfully quirky and full of expression". Mario Vuk from Splash Comics commented that Oda's "pleasantly bright and dynamic" art style suits the story's "funny and exciting" atmosphere. Isaiah Colbert of Kotaku called One Piece a "masterpiece", highlighting Oda's character writing, worldbuilding and the balance between "fun and serious subject matter". Dale Bashir of IGN wrote that One Piece is more about the worldbuilding, adventuring, and the meaning of freedom instead of the "usual shonen battling" from series like Dragon Ball and Naruto. Bashir concluded: "While not everyone would want to go so far for a franchise that isn't even finished yet, trust me when I say that it is definitely worth it."

EX Media lauds Oda's art for its "crispy" monochrome pictures, "great use of subtle shade changes" on color pages, "sometimes exquisite" use of angles, and for its consistency. Shaenon K. Garrity, who at some point edited the series for English Shonen Jump, said that, while doing so, her amazement over Oda's craft grew steadily. She states that "he has a natural, playful mastery of the often restrictive weekly-manga format", notes that "interesting things [are] going on deep in the narrative structure," and recommends "sticking through to the later volumes to see just how crazy and Peter Max-y the art gets". Mania Entertainment writer Jarred Pine commented: "One Piece is a fun adventure story, with an ensemble cast that is continuing to develop, with great action and character drama." He praised Oda's artwork as "imaginative and creative" and commented that "Oda's imagination just oozes all of the panels [sic]". He also noted that "Oda's panel work [...] features a lot of interesting perspectives and direction, especially during the explosive action sequences which are always a blast".

In March 2021, Mobile Suit Gundam's creator, Yoshiyuki Tomino, said in his interview that One Piece is the "only manga to trust". He praised the manga, commenting: "Still, we are working in the same studio and I saw storyboards near the photocopier. Unlike mine, those storyboards are good. But, you know, among the popular manga there is manga with very beautiful art and manga with bad art, but interesting nonetheless. And I don't trust manga with very beautiful art unless it is One Piece.

After the release of the hundredth volume, Weekly Shonen Jump's editor-in-chief, Hiroyuki Nakano, explained how One Piece changed the history of manga and the way of making it. Nakano said that Weekly Shonen Jump is "a game of weekly popularity", and before One Piece, he aimed for something "interesting this week without thinking about the next"; however, the series reached overwhelming popularity due to its style that involved a story concept and detailed hints, adding that the series had a huge impact on other series. Nakano lauded Oda for his "overwhelming passion, talent and power" and his "unwavering will" to deliver a story to boys and girls, adding that he goes far beyond the reader's expectations, with the belief in "don't fool the reader" and "there is something interesting ahead of it".

=== Awards and accolades ===
One Piece was nominated for the 23rd Kodansha Manga Award in the shōnen category in 1999. It was a finalist for the Tezuka Osamu Cultural Prize three times consecutively from 2000 to 2002, with the highest number of fan nominations in the first two years. The manga was nominated for Favorite Manga Series in Nickelodeon Magazine's 2009 Comics Awards. In 2012, the series won the 41st Japan Cartoonists Association Award Grand Prize, alongside Kimuchi Yokoyama's Neko Darake. In 2014, the series received the 18th Yomiuri Advertising Award's Golden Medal. It also won the 34th Newspaper Advertising Award in the Advertising category and the 67th Advertising Dentsu Award in the Newspaper Advertising Planning category.

The forty-sixth volume of One Piece was the best manga of 2007, according to the Oricon's Japanese Book of the Year Action Committee. The series was chosen as one of the best continuing manga for all ages/teens in 2011 by critics from About.com, Anime News Network, and ComicsAlliance. The series has been ranked on the "Book of the Year" list multiple times from Media Factory's Da Vinci magazine, where professional book reviewers, bookstore employees, and Da Vinci readers participate; it ranked fifth in 2011; second in 2012; third in 2013; second in 2014, 2015 and 2016; third in 2017 and 2018; second in 2019; third in 2020 and 2021; second in 2022; third in 2023; fourteenth in 2024; and sixth in 2025. It ranked eighth in the 2023 edition of Takarajimasha's Kono Manga ga Sugoi! list of best manga for male readers. The series also won the award for "Best Shōnen" at the 2009 Manga Barcelona Awards—then known as the Salón del Manga Awards—and was nominated again in the same category for the 2026 edition.

The German translation of the manga won the Sondermann Award in the international manga category in 2005. The series received the award for the forty-fourth volume in 2008 and the forty-eighth volume in 2009. One Piece won the AnimeLand's Anime & Manga 19th Grand Prix for the "Best Classic Shōnen" category in 2012.

In a poll conducted by Oricon in 2008 about "the most moving (touching) manga ever", One Piece ranked first in both male and female categories. In another 2008 poll by Oricon, Japanese teenagers voted it the most interesting manga. On Tencent's anime and manga web portal, One Piece ranked first in a poll of "must-read manga for the younger generation in China". In a poll conducted by eBookJapan in 2014 about "manga that children want to read" for "Children's Reading Day" by the Ministry of Education, Culture, Sports, Science and Technology, the series also ranked first.

On June 15, 2015, it was announced that Eiichiro Oda and One Piece had set the Guinness World Record for "The most copies published for the same comic book series by a single author" with 320,866,000 copies printed worldwide by December 2014; it updated the record on August 4, 2022, when it reached over 500 million copies in circulation worldwide in both print and digital copies (416,566,000 in Japan and 100 million copies in 60 countries and territories outside of Japan). The series ranked fourth on the first annual Tsutaya Comic Awards' All-Time Best Section in 2017. In 2021, TV Asahi announced the results of its "Manga General Election" poll in which 150,000 people voted for their "Most Favorite Manga", with One Piece ranking first on the list.

In 2014, the "One Piece Premiere Summer" event received the "Best Overall Production" award from the International Association of Amusement Parks and Attractions.

=== Cultural impact ===
As part of an effort to help Kumamoto Prefecture recover from the 2016 earthquakes, Oda helped set up 10 statues of the Straw Hat Pirates around the prefecture. Luffy was the first statue to be unveiled in front of the Kumamoto Prefectural Government Office on November 30, 2018. Jinbe was the last statue, unveiled at Sumiyoshi Kaigan Park on July 23, 2022.

At the 2020 Tokyo Olympics, Greek athlete Miltiadis Tentoglou performed a "Gear Second" pose before winning a gold medal in the men's long jump competition. A gene in the fruit fly, Drosophila melanogaster, was named "Baramicin", partly taking inspiration from the One Piece character Buggy. The gene encodes a protein that is split up into multiple parts. The Boston Red Sox hosted a One Piece-themed night in August 2024 and hosted another in May 2025. During their 2024–25 season, the Los Angeles Lakers also had an event night collaboration with One Piece. Subsequently, Los Angeles Dodgers held a night themed around the series in July 2025 and will host another one in July 2026. A testate amoeba genus was named Alabasta, partly in reference to the One Piece Kingdom of Alabasta, also known as the Kingdom of Sand, a desert kingdom located on Sandy Island in the Paradise region. In 2025, the spider species Damarchus inazuma was named after the One Piece character Inazuma, paralleling the spider's gynandromorphism and color pattern with the character's analogous features. In 2026, the beetle genus Luffy and two species (Luffy schillhammeri and Luffy nika) were named after the One Piece protagonist Monkey D. Luffy, due to their longer body features that reflect the character's rubber-like ability to stretch and expand. L. nika derives its name from the white hairs across most of its body, similar to the all-white appearance of Monkey D. Luffy's "Nika" form.

In 2025, the black pirate flag of the Straw Hat Pirates became a prominent protest symbol in Indonesia ahead of the nation's 80th Independence Day, reflecting widespread discontent with the country's democratic backsliding. Indonesian authorities condemned its display as a threat to national unity, with reported instances of police and military confiscating flags during raids. The same flag was also used as a protest symbol in the 2025 Nepalese Gen Z protests, as well as in the Philippines, in France, and in Madagascar, among others.

== Notes ==
Japanese names
