= Wanted! Eiichiro Oda Before One Piece =

Japanese manga anthology

- Cover characters (L–R): top row: Gill Bastar, Ann, guardian deity; middle: Bounty hunter, Luffy, Ryuma; bottom: Branco, God, Guko
- Author: Eiichiro Oda
- Original title: Wanted! Eiichiro Oda Short Stories (WANTED! 尾田栄一郎短編集, WANTED! Oda Eiichirō Tanhenshū)
- Translator: Stephen Paul
- Illustrator: Eiichiro Oda
- Publisher: Shueisha
- Publication date: November 9, 1998
- English publication date: November 12, 2024
- ISBN: 978-1-9747-4992-8

Wanted! Eiichiro Oda Short Stories (Japanese: WANTED! 尾田栄一郎短編集, Hepburn: WANTED! Oda Eiichirō Tanhenshū) is a single volume manga anthology collection of five short stories written and illustrated by Eiichiro Oda, published by Shueisha in November 1998. The stories include Wanted!, Oda's first professional work, which won a second prize Tezuka Award in 1992 when he was 17 years old, and two stories that tie into Oda's best-known work, One Piece: Monsters, retroactively included as a precursor, and Romance Dawn, which developed characters and concepts. The collection was licensed by Viz Media and published in November 2024 as Wanted! Eiichiro Oda Before One Piece with an English translation by Stephen Paul.

== Collected stories ==
=== Wanted! (1992) ===
Gill Bastar, a young gunman in the American western frontier, attracts the notice of a bounty hunter but after Bastar shoots him dead in self-defense, the bounty hunter's ghost haunts and possesses Bastar. Eventually, the ghost forces Bastar to reveal himself to notorious hitman Sino Phoenix and during the ensuing duel, Bastar prevails.

Gill Bastar would later be used by Eiichiro Oda as a secondary character in the One Piece manga.

=== Future Present from God (1993) ===
Watching Branco the pickpocket plying his trade infuriates God, so He decides to strike him down with a meteorite, sealing his fate by writing it in His notebook. However, He mistakenly writes down that "Branch", a major department store, will be struck instead, so He forces Branco to act as his agent and evacuate Branch, using Branco's unique skills.

=== Ikki Yako (1993) ===
"Brave and talented" wandering monk Guko is chased by a spirit and seeks shelter at sundown in a village whose residents beg him to vanquish a man-eating monster. When he visits the nearby shrine, he is frightened by a 300-year-old guardian spirit and after calming down, explains that he is seeking his master, who disappeared five years ago while fighting ghosts. He sneaks away out of cowardice and when he encounters the actual man-eater, learns that it ate his master, Koshin. Seizing the deity's sword, he cuts the monster in two.

=== Monsters (1994) ===
After getting a free meal from Flair the waitress, Ryuma, a wandering samurai, declares his gratitude; she is disgusted when he takes offense at an insignificant slight and duels Shirano, renowned as one of the greatest swordsmen in the world, second only to a man named King. Seven years ago, she was rescued by Shirano as the sole survivor of a dragon attack on her village. Outside the cafe, Ryuma runs into third-rate swordsman D.R., who accuses Ryuma of stabbing him and blows a horn to summon a dragon. D.R. and Shirano actually are thieves who robbed Flair's village and used the horn to conceal the evidence. Ryuma strikes them down and slays the dragon, revealing himself as King.

Monsters was published digitally in English in January 2024, preceding the paperback collection. This coincided with the release of an animated adaptation, Monsters: 103 Mercies Dragon Damnation.

=== Romance Dawn (1996) ===
Monkey D. Luffy saves the wounded roc Balloon and before long is taken aboard a massive pirate ship where he meets Ann, Balloon's owner, held captive by the ship's captain, Spiel the Hexagon. Spiel imprisons Luffy, but Luffy's abilities, powered by the gum-gum devil fruit, allow him to escape easily. He had been drifting on the ocean seeking fellow "peace-main" pirates like his grandfather, who seek adventure and prey on "morganeers" like Spiel, pirates who attack and pillage the innocent. After nearly drowning, he frees Ann, defeats Spiel, and saves Balloon.

Oda wrote two versions of Romance Dawn prior to the debut of One Piece; the version published in Wanted! is the second, which Oda explains is more concise than the first in an afternote. This version was adapted into an animated episode which debuted as episode 907 in October 2019, celebrating the 20th anniversary of the One Piece anime.

== Reception ==
A panel review for Anime News Network resulted in mixed opinions; the three reviewers agreed the collection of Oda's early works is interesting as an exhibit of his first works, but the stories themselves were not generally engaging. In the United States, it was the seventh best-selling manga volume in November 2024.
