= One Piece season 5 =

One Piece
- Season 5 TV Original
- All five DVD cover arts for the season, which released in 2004
- No. of episodes: 13

Release
- Original network: Fuji Television
- Original release: November 3, 2002 – February 2, 2003

Season chronology
- ← Previous; Season 4 Next → Season 6

The fifth season of the One Piece anime television series aired from November 3, 2002, to February 2, 2003, on Fuji Television. Directed by Kōnosuke Uda and produced by Toei Animation. Like the rest of the series, it follows the adventures of Monkey D. Luffy and his Straw Hat Pirates, but instead of adapting part of Eiichiro Oda's One Piece manga, it features three completely original, self-contained filler story arcs, denoted in whole as "TV Original". The first five episodes, each following their own plots, form the "Dreams!" (ドリームス!) arc. The next three episodes make up the "Shutsugeki! Zenii Kaizoku Dan" (出撃! ゼニィ海賊団, lit. "Sortie! Zenny Pirates") storyline and focus on the Straw Hats meeting an old moneylender. The last five episodes form the "Niji no Kanata e" (虹の彼方へ, lit. "To the Other Side of the Rainbow") arc and deal with the protagonists getting trapped inside a mysterious, rainbow-colored mist.

The season was released on DVD in five compilations, each containing one disc with two or three episodes, by Avex Mode between March 3 and July 7, 2004. The season was then licensed for a heavily edited dubbed broadcast in English by 4Kids Entertainment. Their adaptation ran from August 4, 2007, through September 22, 2007, on Cartoon Network and omitted seven of the season's thirteen episodes. It was the last season to be dubbed by 4Kids Entertainment. Starting with the sixth season, Funimation took over dubbing new episodes for broadcast on Cartoon Network. Eventually, they began redubbing the series from the start for uncut release on DVD and released the fifth season, relabeled as "One Piece: Season Two – Seventh Voyage", on May 11, 2010.

Toei Animation's version makes use of three pieces of theme music: one opening theme and two ending themes. The opening theme is "Hikari e" (ヒカリヘ, lit. "Toward the Light") by The Babystars in Japanese and Vic Mignogna in English. The ending themes are "Shining Ray" by Janne Da Arc in Japanese and Justin Houston in English for the first two episodes and "Free Will" by Ruppina in Japanese and Kristine Sa in English for the rest of the season. The 4Kids Entertainment dub uses original theme music in their adaptation.

== Episodes ==
Orig.	4Kids	No. in season	4Kids title / Funimation title Original Japanese title	Directed by	Written by	Animation directed by	Original release date	English air date
Dreams!
131	—	1	"The First Patient! The Untold Story of the Rumble Ball!"; Transliteration: "Hajimete no Kanja! Ranburu Bōru Hiwa" (Japanese: はじめての患者! ランブルボール秘話)	Yūji Endō	Michiru Shimada	Kenji Yokoyama	November 3, 2002	—
The Straw Hats land on an uninhabited island; Sanji immediately notices that it is covered with fruit-bearing trees. The crew decides to divide the work by drawing straws. Luffy, Zoro, and Usopp are sent to gather the fruit while Nami and Sanji survey the island. Chopper is left to guard the ship. He enjoys himself but suddenly realizes that Robin is nearby and flees into the cabin. He works on producing Rumble Balls and talks to himself about his mentor, Dr. Kureha, but notices that Robin is listening to him and breaks a barrel of water in surprise. Robin accompanies Chopper as he goes to replace the spilled liquid and he tells Robin about Dr. Kureha and how she became his first patient.
132	—	2	"Uprising of the Navigator! For the Unyielding Dream!"; Transliteration: "Kōkaishi no Hanran! Yuzure Nai Yume no Tame ni!" (Japanese: 航海士の反乱! ゆずれない夢の為に!)	Harume Kosaka	Ryōta Yamaguchi	Takeo Ide	November 10, 2002	—
While fishing with Chopper and Usopp, Luffy fishes an ammonite-shaped vehicle out of the sea. The pirates debate if it is edible, but to their surprise, its side opens and a traveling salesman emerges. He offers them obscure items and tries to sell a pile of paper to Nami. However, before he can settle the deal, the salesman realizes that he is on a pirate ship and flees in panic, abandoning his merchandise. With the paper, Nami can finally begin drawing the map of the world that she has dreamed about making since her childhood. However, because the rest of the crew is causing mischief, she has trouble completing her work and has to restart twice before finishing her map of Reverse Mountain.
133	—	3	"A Recipe Handed Down! Sanji, the Iron Man of Curry!"; Transliteration: "Uketsugareru Yume! Karē no Tetsujin Sanji" (Japanese: 受け継がれる夢! カレーの鉄人サンジ)	Hidehiko Kadota	Junki Takegami	Masayuki Takagi	November 17, 2002	—
In a thick bank of fog, the Straw Hats run into a fleet of navy ships. Surprised by the sight of the skull and crossbones on the pirate ship's sails, the young trainee cook Tajiyo falls off of his navy vessel. Robin catches him before he hits the water and the boy regains consciousness in the Straw Hats' cabin. Scared at first, he loosens up when presented by Sanji with a soup of surprising quality. The small cook reveals his problem: he spilled the day's production of curry and has been charged with replacing it. To compound the issue, the fleet's captains plan to dine aboard his ship. Luffy and Sanji take Tajiyo back to his ship, where Sanji provides him with subtle cooking advice. Tajiyo's new curry turns out perfectly and the Straw Hats escape before the fog lifts in the mid-day sun.
134	—	4	"I Will Make it Bloom! Usopp, the Man, and the Eight-Foot Shell!"; Transliteration: "Sakasete Misemasu! Otoko Usoppu Hachi Shaku Tama" (Japanese: 咲かせてみせます! 男ウソップ八尺玉)	Munehisa Sakai	Junki Takegami	Hideaki Maniwa	November 24, 2002	—
Because it is raining, Luffy reads out of boredom. Fortunately for him, the Straw Hats' ship reaches the next island. Walking through its port town, they learn that the island known for its yearly fireworks show, which was to occur that day. The fireworks factory, run by an old man named Odama and his granddaughter Kodama, is on a hill outside the town. Usopp goes there, hoping for an opportunity to buy gunpowder. At the factory, he helps Odama and Kodama prepare for the show. Usopp learns that Kodama plans to secretly fire the second of two eight-shaku-tall firework balls to fulfill her parents' dream. Her parents died the previous year after the first misfired, and Usopp convinces Kodama that it is too dangerous for her to fire it. Usopp uses a tall, ancient building to safely launch the large firework ball.
135	99	5	"Legend of the Pirate Hunter!" "The Fabled Pirate Hunter! Zoro, the Wandering Swordsman!"; Transliteration: "Uwasa no Kaizoku Gari! Sasurai no Kenshi Zoro" (Japanese: 噂の海賊狩り! さすらいの剣士ゾロ)	Junji Shimizu	Junki Takegami	Naoki Tate	December 1, 2002	August 4, 2007
Before he meets Luffy, Zoro traveled the world in search of "Hawk-Eye" Mihawk. In a flashback, Zoro captures the target of the bounty hunters Johnny and Yosaku in a bar. According to bounty hunter rules, they demand that he relinquish the victim's body to them. Zoro, who does not consider himself a bounty hunter, complies, explaining that he only brings in a bounty from time to time so that he can survive until he can become the greatest swordsman in the world. Later that day, a group of bandits, led by a man with a much higher bounty, plunders the village. Johnny and Yosaku, inspired by Zoro's conviction, decide to take on the villain, but are quickly defeated. As the bandits prepare to kill the pair, Zoro returns and saves Johnny and Yosaku. After he defeats the bandits and their leader, Johnny and Yosaku become his followers.
The Zenny Pirate Crew Sortie!
136	—	6	"Zenny of the Island of Goats and the Pirate Ship in the Mountains!"; Transliteration: "Yagi no Shima no Zenii to Yama no Naka no Kaizoku Sen!" (Japanese: ヤギの島のゼニィと山の中の海賊船!)	Directed by : Jun'ichi Fujise; Storyboarded by : Kenji Yokoyama	Yoshiyuki Suga	Kazuya Hisada	December 8, 2002	—
A few navy ships chase the Straw Hats. To escape them, the Straw Hats sail through an area of wild currents, which surround an island that is only inhabited by an old man named Zenny and his goats. Zenny realizes that the Straw Hats are pirates and sends his goats to attack them. During the fight Zenny's heart stops from fear. The Straw Hats take him to his home, nurse him back to health, and complete his chores, such as cleaning his house, preparing meals, and chopping wood. Zoro searches for food and discovers a small nearly completed pirate ship atop the island's mountain. At the day's end, as the crew is about to leave, Chopper reveals that the old man will die within three days. Driven by guilt, the Straw Hats decide to stay with him until then.
137	—	7	"How's Tricks? The Designs of Zenny the Moneylender!"; Transliteration: "Mōkarimakka? Kanekashi Zenii no Yabō!" (Japanese: 儲かりまっか? 金貸しゼニィの野望!)	Yūji Endō	Yoshiyuki Suga	Kenji Yokoyama	December 15, 2002	—
The Straw Hats continue to do Zenny's daily work and finish building his pirate ship, which he intends to use as a coffin. Zoro eventually realizes that the three days until Zenny's death, which Chopper had diagnosed, have long passed, but by the time he convinces the others to leave, Nami has already lost the Straw Hats' ship in a game of chess. Robin wins it back and they all have a party. As Zenny becomes drunk, he recollects his past as a moneylender who lent money to pirates. He describes how he was shipwrecked twenty years earlier, and that he, in hopes of one day becoming a pirate, started building a ship. As the years passed, he became too old for a pirate's life. Luffy disagrees, saying that pirates can be of any age. The next day, a group of marines lures the Straw Hats into a trap. To save them, Zenny and his goats ride his ship down the mountainside.
138	—	8	"Whereabouts of the Island Treasure! Attack of the Zenny Pirates!"; Transliteration: "Shima no Otakara no Yukue! Zenii Kaizoku Dan Shutsugeki!" (Japanese: 島のお宝の行方! ゼニィ海賊団出撃!)	Yōko Ikeda	Yoshiyuki Suga	Takeo Ide	December 22, 2002	—
The commotion caused by Zenny's arrival allows Nami, Sanji, Usopp, and Chopper to board their ship safely. Zenny and his goats get on the navy ship and Zenny uses of his martial arts skills, with a counting frame to fight. Luffy attempts to slingshot himself over to help him, but lands in the water instead. Zoro immediately jumps in after him to rescue the non-swimmer, only to be run over by the Straw Hats' own ship. The marines are eventually defeated, but a fleet of nine more ships is still waiting in the fog surrounding the island. Zenny tells the Straw Hats that, on his arrival on the island, the goats ate all of his money and that they became his treasure instead. The Straw Hats give Zenny enough medicine to survive and leave the island, escaping from the navy.
Beyond the Rainbow
139	100	9	"The Rainbow Mist" "Legend of the Rainbow Mist! Old Man Henzo of Luluka Island!"; Transliteration: "Nijiiro no Kiri Densetsu! Rurukajima no Rōjin Henzo" (Japanese: 虹色の霧伝説! ルルカ島の老人ヘンゾ)	Hidehiko Kadota	Ryōta Yamaguchi	Masayuki Takagi	January 5, 2003	August 11, 2007
After escaping from another fleet of navy ships, the Straw Hats drop anchor outside a town with a huge tower. After they set foot on land, an official demands that they pay a harbor tax. The Straw Hats meet a scientist named Henzo, who asks them if they have seen what he calls the "Rainbow Mist." The other citizens of the town dislike Henzo because they have to pay high taxes to fund for his research. While shopping with Nami and Chopper, Sanji has a violent encounter with a tax collector, who is wearing an electric battle suit. A large, unmanned galley appears in the harbor, in the same condition that Henzo saw it fifty years ago. Henzo, Luffy, Robin, and Usopp board it. Further out at sea, a rainbow-colored mist appears and the group uses the Straw Hats' ship to enter it.
140	101	10	"Wreckers Reef" "Residents of the Land of Eternity! The Pumpkin Pirates!"; Transliteration: "Eien no Kuni no Jūnin! Panpukin Kaizoku Dan!" (Japanese: 永遠の国の住人! パンプキン海賊団!)	Munehisa Sakai	Ryōta Yamaguchi	Hideaki Maniwa	January 12, 2003	August 25, 2007
Inside the mist, Luffy and his group discover a large ship graveyard. Luffy salvages a chest filled with gold and jewels from one of the shipwrecks, but a distant voice tells him to return the treasure and leave the mist. Usopp believes the voices to be ghosts, but they actually originate from a group of children who call themselves the Pumpkin Pirates. In his youth, Henzo was a member of this group, and they are the reason for his research. He spent his life in search of a means to rescue them from the Rainbow Mist. Only a short time earlier from their point of view, but fifty years earlier from Henzo's perspective, a group of pirates, led by a Captain Whetton, attacked the children's town. When Whetton came after the children, they tried to escape by stealing the pirates' ship. During the fight, Whetton smashed the ship's helm, and Henzo jumped overboard, taking Whetton with him, while the other children sailed into the mist.
141	102	11	"No Way Out" "Thoughts of Home! The Pirate Graveyard of No Escape!"; Transliteration: "Kokyū e no Omoi! Dasshutsu Funō no Kaizoku Hakaba!" (Japanese: 故郷への想い! 脱出不能の海賊墓場!)	Ken Koyama	Ryōta Yamaguchi	Naoki Tate	January 19, 2003	September 1, 2007
After entering the Rainbow Mist, the children followed the orders of Ian, the only pirate left on the ship. He mistreated them and they eventually locked him up in the brig of the wreck of a navy ship. Luffy and his group try to escape the mist, but they soon realize that they need help. The Straw Hats persuade one of the children to lead them to the Pumpkin Pirates' hiding place so they can ask them for a way out. Usopp prepares a steaming meal, which causes most of the children to like the Straw Hats; however, their leader, Lapanui, remains suspicious and unwilling to help. Henzo's transponder snail rings and the son of Whetton wants Henzo to investigate the mist, not knowing that the professor is already inside the mist. When Lapanui hears Whetton's name, he loses what little trust he has for Henzo.
142	103	12	"Into The Mist" "An Inevitable Melee! Wetton's Schemes and the Rainbow Tower!"; Transliteration: "Ransen Hissu! Uetton no Yabō to Niji no Tō" (Japanese: 乱戦必死! ウエットンの野望と虹の塔)	Yūji Endō	Ryōta Yamaguchi	Kazuya Hisada	January 26, 2003	September 15, 2007
Lapanui accuses Henzo of being Whetton's lapdog and says that in the past, Henzo would have never allowed that to happen. Usopp tells Lapanui that Henzo had endured the same insults from the townspeople yet still tried to rescue the children. Then, for no apparent reason, Luffy slingshots himself and Lapanui to another part of the mist. At the harbor, Nami ties a long lifeline, prepared by Henzo, to a boat and enters the Rainbow Mist. Once inside, Ian, who convinced one of the children to release him, steals the boat and escapes. He reaches Whetton and describes to him the mist's treasures. Whetton orders his men to invade the mist. The town's large tower falls into the water, creating a bridge from the island into the mist, and Whetton and his men cross it to attack.
143	104	13	"The Great Escape!" "And so, the Legend Begins! To the Other Side of the Rainbow!"; Transliteration: "Soshite Densetsu ga Hajimaru! Iza Niji no Kanata e" (Japanese: そして伝説が始まる! いざ虹の彼方へ)	Directed by : Jun'ichi Fujise; Storyboarded by : Junji Shimizu	Ryōta Yamaguchi	Kenji Yokoyama	February 2, 2003	September 22, 2007
Luffy and Lapanui are outside the mist and use the newly created bridge to reenter it. There, Luffy fights Whetton and, as it becomes clear that he cannot defeat Luffy face-to-face, Whetton detonates the tower, trapping everyone else inside and Whetton's abandoned men join forces with Luffy's group. An exit appears in the distance and they row toward it, but it closes too fast for them to reach it. Hoping to generate enough wind to blow the Straw Hats' ship clear of the mist, Lapanui stays behind to destroy the navy ship's armory. The other children follow him, promising to meet Henzo again. The explosion they cause successfully blows the Straw Hats' ship outside the mist. There, a group of navy ships, led by an aged Lapanui, arrives and confiscates the Rainbow Mist's treasures from Whetton and takes him and his men into custody.

== Home media release ==
=== Japanese ===
Avex Mode (Japan, Region 2 DVD)
Volume		Episodes	Release date	Ref.
5thシーズン ドリームス!前篇	piece.01	131–132	March 3, 2004	
5thシーズン ドリームス!前篇	piece.02	133–135	April 7, 2004	
5thシーズン ドリームス!前篇	piece.03	136–138	May 12, 2004	
5thシーズン ドリームス!前篇	piece.04	139–140	June 2, 2004	
5thシーズン ドリームス!前篇	piece.05	141–143	July 7, 2004	

=== English ===
In North America, this season was recategorized as the end of "Season Two" for its DVD release by Funimation Entertainment. The Australian Season Two set was renamed Collection 11.

Funimation Entertainment (USA, Region 1), Manga Entertainment (UK, Region 2), Madman Entertainment (Australia, Region 4)
Volume		Episodes	Release date			ISBN	Ref.
Volume		Episodes	USA	UK	Australia	ISBN	Ref.
Season Two	Seventh Voyage	131–143	May 11, 2010	N/A	July 20, 2011	ISBN 1-4210-2075-0	
Collections	Collection 6	131–156	June 12, 2012	May 19, 2014	N/A	ISBN 1-4210-2492-6	
Treasure Chest Collection	Two	104–205	N/A		October 31, 2013	ISBN N/A	
Voyage Collection	Three	104-156	N/A		October 4, 2017	ISBN N/A	
