= One Piece season 18 =

Season of television series

One Piece
- Season 18; Zou
- Cover art for the first home media volume of the season as released by Avex Pictures
- No. of episodes: 36

Release
- Original network: Fuji Television
- Original release: June 26, 2016 – April 2, 2017

Season chronology
- ← Previous; Season 17 Next → Season 19

The eighteenth season of the One Piece anime television series was produced by Toei Animation, and directed by Toshinori Fukuzawa, Satoshi Ito, and Tatsuya Nagamine. The season began broadcasting in Japan on Fuji Television from June 26, 2016, to April 2, 2017. Like the rest of the series, it follows the adventures of Monkey D. Luffy and his Straw Hat Pirates. The season contains three story arcs.

The "Silver Mine" story arc, being an original story of the anime, deals with Luffy and Bartolomeo getting kidnapped by the Silver Pirate Alliance; the story also serves as an introduction to the events of the film One Piece Film: Gold. The "Zou" story arc adapts material beginning from the middle of the 80th volume to the middle of the 82nd volume of the manga by Eiichiro Oda. The Straw Hats arrived at Zou to reunite with Sanji and the others, only to discover Sanji has been swept up in a personal conflict and that Zou has been under siege by the Beasts Pirates. The "Marine Rookie" story arc, also an original story of the anime, deals with Luffy robbing a marine base for food after running out of it on the ship.

Only a single piece of theme music is used for this season. The opening theme, titled "We Can" (ウィーキャン!), is performed by Kishidan and Hiroshi Kitadani. However, from episodes 753–756 in the Japanese broadcast only due to licensing reasons and as to promote One Piece Film: Gold, there is a special opening movie featuring scenes from the afterformentioned film.

== Episodes ==
No. overall (Note: Episode number by Toei Animation's count)	No. in season	Title (Note: Title of the episode: literally translated, romanized using Hepburn romanization, and in kanji form)	Directed by	Written by	Original release date (Note: Date the episode originally aired on Fuji Television)	English air date
Silver Mine
747	1	"The Silver Fortress! Luffy and Barto's Great Adventure!"; Transliteration: "Gin no Yōsai - Rufi to Baruto Dai Bōken" (Japanese: 銀の要塞 ルフィとバルト大冒険)	Yoshihiro Ueda	Jin Tanaka	June 26, 2016	October 5, 2025
The Straw Hat Pirates and their allies are shocked by the Barto Club's navigational incompetence while sailing through a hail storm in the New World. That night, Luffy and Bartolomeo are captured Desire and the Sweet Pirates, who take them to the island of Silver Mine while Peseta traps the others with his Adhesive Shells. On Silver Mine, the Silver Pirate Alliance led by Bill prepares to kill Luffy, who is trapped in a silver ball, with his Smelt-Smelt Fruit ability allowing him to forge weapons from his body by consuming ore. However, Bartolomeo helps Luffy escape, (despite being unable to make barriers due to he's hand being glued to a pickax) and reveals to Luffy that Desire is a childhood friend of his the two are chased by the Sweet Pirates, but fall into a chasm along with Desire. Bill hears about this and leaves it to Avelon, while he gives a man named Tanaka a donation of silver for a certain man referred to as "The Monster of the New World".
748	2	"An Underground Maze! Luffy vs. the Tram Human!"; Transliteration: "Chika Meikyū - Rufi tai Torokko Ningen" (Japanese: 地下迷宮 ルフィVS(たい)トロッコ人間)	Satoshi Itō	Jin Tanaka	July 3, 2016	October 12, 2025
Inside the underground mines, Luffy and Bartolomeo are targeted by the Rail Car Man Avelon, who attacks them from the mine-tracks using his Roll-Roll Fruit. Desire is attacked as well, which shocks her, as Bill had rescued her crew after most of her crew was annihilated. The three are then sent plummeting further underground, where Desire explains he anger towards Bartolomeo is because when they were younger they had promised to aim for the top together, but she set off alone with her friends after Bartolomeo decided to help Luffy become Pirate King instead. The three then discover members of the Silver Pirate Alliance who are enslaved as miners due to not pleasing Bill. Bartolomeo manages to free his hands, and Avelon returns, unwittingly freeing Luffy from his silver ball with an attack. Luffy and Bartolomeo then work together to defeat Avelon, and upon hearing about this, Bill orders the underground mine to be buried.
749	3	"The Sword Technique Heats Up! Law and Zoro Finally Appear!"; Transliteration: "Kengi Hakunetsu - Law to Zoro Tsui ni Kenzan!" (Japanese: 剣技白熱 ロー・(と)ゾロ遂に見参！)	Kentarō Fujita	Shōji Yonemura	July 10, 2016	October 19, 2025
Luffy, Bartolomeo, Desire, and the miners attempt to escape the underground mine, but are attacked by Peseta and his men, who destroy the rails. In response, Bartolomeo creates a staircase to the surface. Before they can make it out, they're confronted by more of Peseta's men who fire molten ore at them. However, Kin'emon arrives, having been switched with a miner thanks to Law, and helps them escape. Peseta shows up holding Desire's crew hostage, but they're saved by Zoro, who effortlessly defeats Peseta. As the pirates prepare to return to the besieged Going Luffy-senpai, Luffy, Bartolomeo, and Desire are confronted by Bill, who reveals that he was the one who annihilated Desire's crew.
750	4	"A Desperate Situation! Luffy Fights a Battle in Extreme Heat!"; Transliteration: "Zettai Zetsumei - Rufi Kyokugen no Shakunetsu Kessen" (Japanese: 絶対絶命 ルフィ極限の灼熱決戦)	Yoshihiro Ueda	Jin Tanaka	July 17, 2016	November 2, 2025
As Bill mocks Desire for believing him, he admits to using all the bounties and treasures his subordinates brought him to live lusciously. An angered Luffy attacks and easily overwhelms Bill in battle before more of Bill's subordinates appear. Desire tries to tell them of Bill's true nature, but he lies to them saying Desire is a traitor and has them attack Luffy. Luffy knocks them out with Conqueror Haki before attacking Bill again and sends him down the underground mine were Tanaka tells Bill that his superior will discard him if he fails. In response, Bill eats massive amounts of ore and returns while having grown massive, releasing large amounts of molten ore that severely damages Silver Mine. Bartolomeo uses him barrier to push the molten ore back towards Bill. However, Bill emerges unharmed with his body now complete coated in silver and creates a massive sphere of molten ore. Luffy uses his Gum-Gum Grizzly Magnum to break the ball of ore and defeat Bill. Luffy, Bartolomeo, Desire and the members of the Silver Pirate Alliance escape as Silver Mine sinks into the ocean along with Bill. As the Straw Hats and Barto Club set off for Zou, Bartolomeo offers Desire to join his crew, but she turns him down, wanting to follow her own dreams instead of Luffy's, and departs with her crew. Meanwhile, the Revolutionary Army approaches Gran Tesoro, as a powerful man known as Gild Tesoro receives the report of Bill's death.
Zou
751	5	"Curtain-up on a New Adventure! Arriving at the Phantom Island, Zou!"; Transliteration: "Bōken Kaimaku - Maboroshi no Shima "Zō" Tōchaku!" (Japanese: 冒険開幕 幻の島｢ゾウ｣到着！)	Katsumi Tokoro	Tomohiro Nakayama	July 31, 2016	November 9, 2025
Bartolomeo tells his crew how the Straw Hats first came to be. Meanwhile, at Marine Headquarters Admiral Kizaru gets a report about the new Warlord Edward Weevil defeating sixteen of Whitebeard's allies while destroying cities. Many people doubt his claim of being Whitebeard's biological son, but Kizaru states his strength is similar to the former Emperor in his prime. After being caught in thick fog, everyone on the Barto Club's ship spot a huge shadow moving to which their surprise is a massive elephant. Law reveals that Zou is on the elephant's back where it's populated by the Mink Tribe for 1000 years.
752	6	"The New Warlord! The Legendary Whitebeard's Son Appears!"; Transliteration: "Shin Shichibukai - Densetsu: Shirohige no Musuko Tōjō" (Japanese: 新七武海 伝説・白ひげの息子登場)	Tetsuya Endō	Atsuhiro Tomioka	August 7, 2016	November 16, 2025
The Straw Hats and The Barto Club go their separate ways after reaching Zou and the Thousand Sunny. Meanwhile, at Baltigo, Dragon prepares to summon all the top members of the Revolutionary Army after receiving reports of victories on various islands after the Dressrosa incident. Unaware to them, Burgess is near their base, due to stowing away on a ship by chance, and contacts Laffitte and Shiliew to bring the Blackbeard Pirates to pillage it to obtain many weapons. After defeating the A.O. Pirates, Edward Weevil and his mother, Bakkin, decide to go after Luffy in order to find the rest of the Whitebeard pirates. On another island, Buggy's organization makes a killing in the business left behind after Doflamingo's defeat but lose their strongest fighters to Luffy.
753	7	"A Deadly Elephant Climb! A Great Adventure on the Back of the Giant Elephant!"; Transliteration: "Kesshi no Tozō - Kyozō no Se no Dai-bōken!" (Japanese: 決死の登象 巨象の背の大冒険！)	Takashi Ōtsuka	Atsuhiro Tomioka	August 21, 2016	November 23, 2025
The Straw Hats, samurais, and Law climb Zou while discussing about the others and Raizo until a monkey knocks Kin'emon and Kanjuro off Ryunosuke. As the Straw Hats and Law make it to the top of Zou, they find the Mokomo Dukedom in ruins. They search through the abandoned country and are attacked by the Minks, a race of humanoids with furry mammalian features that inhabit Zou, with one of them wearing Nami's clothes.
754	8	"A Battle Begins! Luffy vs. the Mink Tribe!"; Transliteration: "Sentō Kaishi - Rufi tai Minku-zoku!" (Japanese: 戦闘開始 ルフィVS(たい)ミンク族！)	Yasunori Koyama	Atsuhiro Tomioka	August 28, 2016	November 30, 2025
The Minks, rabbit mink Carrot and dog mink Wanda, leave the Straw Hats and Law in order to stop Luffy from invading the Whale Forest and getting attacked by the Guardians, but not before giving them directions that'll lead them to their friend's corpse, horrifying the Straw Hats. Not sure if they should trust Wanda, Law advises the others to follow him to find Bepo, who the Straw Hats realize is a polar bear mink. Luffy comes into conflict with two Guardians, bull mink Roddy and gorilla mink Blackback, but Wanda and Carrot intervene. Meanwhile, the Straw Hats and Law walk through Kurau City, seeing signs of recent heavy damage, which Wanda reveals is due to an attack by a pirate named Jack as she prepares to take Luffy to see his crewmates that had come to Zou earlier.
755	9	"Garchu! The Straw Hats Reunite!"; Transliteration: "Garuchū! Mugiwara no Ichimi Sai Shūketsu" (Japanese: ガルチュー！麦わらの一味再集結)	Masahiro Hosoda	Tomohiro Nakayama	September 4, 2016	December 7, 2025
Zunisha, the elephant that carries Zou on its back, spouts water onto Zou, throwing the Straw Hats into chaos. Meanwhile, Kin'emon, Kanjuro, and the monkey mink attempt to climb back up to Zou, but the water causes them to fall off again. Luffy, Wanda, and Carrot reunite with Law and the rest of the Straw Hats and head to the Right Belly Fortress, where they receive an unexpectedly friendly welcome from the minks. They then reunite with Nami and Chopper, but Nami hugs Luffy and starts crying as she begins to reveal something the truth about Sanji.
756	10	"Start to Counterattack! Great Moves by the Twirly Hat Crew!"; Transliteration: "Hangeki Kaishi - Guruwara no Ichimi Dai-katsuyaku!" (Japanese: 反撃開始 ぐるわらの一味大活躍！)	Satoshi Itō	Shōji Yonemura	September 11, 2016	December 14, 2025
Kin'emon and Kanjuro find themselves back at the bottom of the elephant's leg after the eruption rain pushes them down. The Straw Hats have a feast with the Mink Tribe until Brook arrives and asks to talk to them privately. Before Brook can tell them anything, several dog minks arrive and chew on his bones, relieving the Straw Hats upon realizing the corpse Wanda mentioned earlier was Brook, who the minks refer to as "Baron Corpse". Nami explains that they were attacked by one of Big Mom's ships, launched a counterattack, then arrived at Zou. Wanda was about to explain how the city was destroyed, but then Duke Dogstorm, one of the rulers of Mokomo Dukedom, woke up and asked to see the saviours.
757	11	"A Threat Descends! The Beast Pirates, Jack!"; Transliteration: "Kyoui Shurai - Hyakujuu Kaizokudan Jakku!" (Japanese: 脅威襲来 百獣海賊団ジャック！)	Yoshihiro Ueda	Atsuhiro Tomioka	September 25, 2016	December 21, 2025
As Law reunites with his crew, the Straw Hats go to see Duke Dogstorm and learn what happened 17 days ago to Zou. Jack and the Beast Pirates attacked the country looking for Raizo, who the minks never heard of. However, Jack doesn't buy this and continues his assault but the minks, all of which are natural born fighters and with the ability to conduct electricity known as Electro, fight back. Back in the present, Brook tells the crew not to mention the samurai of Wano because of this but Luffy still ends up mentioning them, shocking everyone.
758	12	"The King of the Day! Duke Dogstorm Appears!"; Transliteration: "Hiru no Ō - Inuarashi Koushaku Toujou!" (Japanese: 昼の王 イヌアラシ公爵登場！)	Kentarō Fujita	Tomohiro Nakayama	October 2, 2016	January 4, 2026
The Straw Hats and Wanda reach Duke Dogstorm's sanatorium, where they meet the Duke as well as his subordinate Sicilian. As night falls, Duke Dogstorm and his subjects fall asleep while Wanda tells the Straw Hats about how Duke Dogstorm and the Musketeers arrived and fought against Jack.
759	13	"The King of the Night! Master Cat Viper Emerges!"; Transliteration: "Yoru no Ō - Nekomamushi no Danna Kenzan!" (Japanese: 夜の王 ネコマムシの旦那見参！)	Katsumi Tokoro	Shōji Yonemura	October 9, 2016	January 11, 2026
Duke Dogstorm tries to explain to Jack that there are no samurais in the country and they should stop their destruction. Jack ignores him and they begin fighting. A rainruption gives the Minks a slight upper hand, but then at 6pm Dogstorm retreats with his musketeers to allow the King of the Night to take over. Master Cat Viper emerges displaying his strength to Jack by flipping him over. Jack is angered and turns into his human form, revealing he ate an Ancient-Zoan Devil Fruit, the Elephant-Elephant Fruit: Model Mammoth and is revealed to a bounty of a billion.
760	14	"The Exterminated Capital! The Twirly Hat Crew Arrive!"; Transliteration: "Shuto Kaimetsu - Guru wara no Ichimi Jōriku!" (Japanese: 首都壊滅 ぐるわらの一味上陸！)	Tetsuya Endō	Jin Tanaka	October 16, 2016	January 18, 2026
Master Cat Viper fights against Jack in his human form. Eventually the sun rises and the day shift takes over as Duke Dogstorm reappears to once again do battle with Jack. Wanda explains to Luffy and the others that the battle dragged on for five days, during which the two rulers repelled the enemy forces but were unable to bring down Jack. On the fifth day, Jack out of anger unleashed a poison gas weapon on the whole city which quickly brought the Minks resistance to an end. Jack then proceeded to torture the two rulers and their subordinates to the point where he cut off Duke Dogstorm's leg and Master Cat Viper's arm. She then explains how Jack left the island after hearing Doflamingo's defeat to rescue him and was supposedly killed in the attempt. The very next day, Sanji's group lands at Zou and stumbles upon the destroyed capital finding the wounded and injured citizens slowly dying from the poisonous gas.
761	15	"The Time Limit Closes In! The Bond Between the Mink Tribe and the Crew!"; Transliteration: "Kokugen Semaru - Minku Zoku to Ichimi no Kizuna!" (Japanese: 刻限迫る ミンク族と一味の絆！)	Yoshihiro Ueda	Atsuhiro Tomioka	October 23, 2016	January 25, 2026
Sanji, Chopper, and Caesar temporarily leave the ruined city to formulate a plan when they hear Nami cry out in distress. Sanji immediately comes to her rescue and saves her from a group of Jack's subordinates who then quickly flee the island. Regrouping, they force Caesar to use his powers to clear away the gas and to help create an antidote since he was the one who created it. As soon as the gas is removed they move in to help the wounded when Nami is attacked by an angry Wanda who thinks they are with Jack. However, she immediately relents when Pedro confirms they are not. With Caesar's help, Chopper creates an antidote which the rest of the crew quickly administers to the survivors. After everyone's been treated, Sanji passes out food to the hungry Minks while Brook plays music to the Minks delight. Wanda explain that they owe a debt to the straws hats that they hope they can one day repay. Chopper then announces that its time for him to check on Master Cat Viper and the crew asks to tag along which Wanda allows.
762	16	"The Delinquent Comes Home! Emperor Big Mom's Assassins!"; Transliteration: "Akudō Kikyō Yon - Sumeragi Biggu Mamu no Shikaku" (Japanese: 悪童帰郷 四皇ビッグ・マムの刺客)	Directed by : Kentarō Fujita; Storyboarded by : Toshinori Fukuzawa	Tomohiro Nakayama	October 30, 2016	February 1, 2026
As they walk through the forest, Brook explains the story behind Sanji's disappearance. Apparently, Big Mom's assassins had managed to track the Straw Hats to Zou, thanks to the fact that Pekoms is actually a Mink and who was known to be a delinquent among the tribe. Pekoms and Capone "Gang" Bege land on the island and quickly learn of Jack's attack and the Straw Hats miraculous rescue. Wanting to settle the matter without conflict Sanji and Brook meet with the two in the forest alone to listen to their demands. Bege mentions that they have another mission besides capturing Caesar. However, Pekoms says he can't harm the Straw Hats after knowing that they saved his homeland from destruction. Angered, Bege calls him a coward and subsequently shoots him in the back.
763	17	"The Truth Behind the Disappearance! Sanji Gets a Startling Invitation!"; Transliteration: "Shissō no Shinjitsu - Sanji Kyōgaku no Shōtai Jō" (Japanese: 失踪の真実 サンジ驚愕の招待状)	Satoshi Itō	Shōji Yonemura	November 6, 2016	February 8, 2026
Bege tells Sanji and Brook that Pekoms is no longer needed and then proceeds to use his Castle-Castle Fruit ability to call out the soldiers from inside his body to fight Sanji and Brook, then cornering them. It was later found out that Nami and Chopper followed Sanji but they were captured by Vito. Ceaser, who was also hiding in the trees, gets exposed by Bege. Bege then takes the crew into his own body and hands out an invitation for Big Mom's tea party, which was followed by Bege telling them that it was for Sanji's wedding with Charlotte Pudding. It was also found out that Sanji was the son in the Vinsmoke family. When Sanji refuses the invitation, Bege tells the Straw Hat crew that they have already been captured by Bege as they are in his body and the latter used his Castle-Castle ability to corner Sanji. After that, Vito advices Sanji against turning down Big Mom's invitation before whispering something to him, which after hearing the latter, becomes angry.
764	18	"To My Buds! Sanji's Farewell Note!"; Transliteration: "Yarō-domo e - Sanji Wakare no Okitegami" (Japanese: 野郎共へ サンジ別れの置手紙)	Yasunori Koyama	Jin Tanaka	November 13, 2016	February 15, 2026
Sanji calmly asks Bege for a pen and paper which he assumes is for leaving a note for his captain. After writing a short message, Sanji gives it to Nami to deliver to Luffy before giving the three of them a short goodbye. He embraces them in what appears to be a hug only to then spin around throwing them outside the castle gate and outside of Bege's body where they instantly return to normal size. Bege moves to recapture them only to be stopped by Master Cat Viper whom Sanji had sensed was nearby. Meanwhile, back inside the castle, Sanji takes Caesar hostage and threats to kill him to force Bege to leave the island peacefully upon realize that neither of them can be harmed. He reluctantly complies and Nami, Chopper, and Brook are forced to watch him leave with their friend. As Nami finishes the story, Luffy angrily disapproves of the whole thing and resolves to get Sanji back. Brook points out that they have someone who knows where Sanji is being taken.
765	19	"Let's Go and Meet Master Cat Viper!"; Transliteration: "Nekomamushi no Dan'na ni Ai ni Yukō" (Japanese: ネコマムシの旦那に会いに行こう)	Tatsuya Nagamine	Atsuhiro Tomioka	November 20, 2016	February 22, 2026
As they continue to travel through the whale forest the group is suddenly attacked by a swarm of Sutchies, large insects that feed on blood and are a menace to the Mink Tribe. Working together the straw hats along with Wanda and Carrot quickly exterminate them. While they are walking, Brook lightens the mood with a song about going to meet Master Cat Viper. He finishes the song just as they reach the forest guardian's home where they are met by Pedro, captain of the guardians. Entering the compound, Chopper quickly begins administering treatment to Master Cat Viper while Luffy and the others meet with Pekoms who they learn is now awake. He tells them that the head of the Vinsmoke family; Sanji's father is the one who ordered the wedding. Pekoms also says that he is the leader of an organization of assassin's known as Germa 66 whom Nami says is a mythical army that doesn't exist.
766	20	"Luffy's Decision! Sanji on the Brink of Quitting!"; Transliteration: "Rufi Ketsudan - Sanji Dattai no Kiki!" (Japanese: ルフィ決断 サンジ脱退の危機！)	Masahiro Hosoda	Tomohiro Nakayama	November 27, 2016	March 1, 2026
Pekoms tells Luffy that the wedding between Sanji and Big Mom's daughter is to form an alliance between the Vinsmoke family and the Charlotte family, and that the Staw Hats won't become her subordinates. However, once the wedding is complete, Sanji will no longer be part of the Straw Hat crew. Luffy retorts saying Sanji will refuse but Pekoms warns that if he does, then Big Mom will kill someone close to him. Luffy then makes the decision to follow Pekoms to the tea party to sabotage the wedding and bring Sanji back. Law reappears and after introducing his crew talks with Luffy about his plan, warning him that Kaido will be coming for them soon and that the country is also in danger. Master Cat Viper then shows up and orders a feast to be thrown in the Straw Hats honor. While the rest of the crew parties Brook, Robin, and Franky stand guard at the city gate to prevent Kin'emon and Kanjuro from entering the kingdom and invoking the wrath of the Minks. Unfortunately, the three of them end up falling asleep and the two samurai pass through the gate to look for Luffy.
767	21	"A Volatile Situation! The Dog and the Cat and the Samurai!"; Transliteration: "Isshokusokuhatsu - Inu to Neko to Samurai!" (Japanese: 一触即発 イヌとネコと侍！)	Toshinori Fukuzawa	Shōji Yonemura	December 4, 2016	March 8, 2026
The monkey from the gate sees the two samurai and immediately rings the warning bell to warn the rest of the country. Duke Dogstorm and Master Cat Viper both mobilize their troops and rush to the ruin city to intercept them. As they search, the two kings run into each other and due to their intense rivalry prepare to fight. Meanwhile, Luffy and the rest of the Straw Hats race to find Kin'emon and Kanjuro (who have already reunited with Momonosuke) and manage to stop them as they enter the city. Kin'emon, upon seeing the two kings fight, reveals himself and his comrades to the Minks, announcing that they are from the Kozuki clan in the Land of Wano much to Luffy and the others horror. However, instead of attacking Dogstorm and Master Cat Viper and the rest of the tribe all bow to the two samurai, quickly explaining to the Straw Hats that they have been friends with Kin'emon's clan and that they are like family to them. Luffy and the others are then shocked to learn that Raizo had indeed been on Zou all along and that the entire country lied to Jack and the Beast Pirates to keep him safe. Usopp then asks why they would all risk their lives for one person and Master Cat Viper replies that no matter what, they'd never sell out their friends to which Luffy smiles.
768	22	"The Third One! Raizo of the Mist, the Ninja, Appears!"; Transliteration: "Sannin Me! Ninja: Kiri no Raizō Tōjō!" (Japanese: 三人目！忍者・霧の雷ぞう登場！)	Directed by : Yoshihiro Ueda; Storyboarded by : Tetsuya Endō	Jin Tanaka	December 11, 2016	March 15, 2026
Kin'emon expresses his gratitude to the two rulers for keeping Raizo safe. However, Dogstorm and Cat Viper quickly become angry at each other and prepare to fight only to be chastised by Momonosuke who they quickly bow to. Kin'emon reveals that he is not Momonosuke's father and that his real father is Kozuki Oden, the great daimyo of Kuri in the Land of Wano. He also explains that he and Kanjuro along with Duke Dogstorm and Master Cat Viper serve as his retainers. As Luffy and the others take this in, Dogstorm and Cat Viper decide to call a truce and be more friendly to one other to which the rest of the Minks rejoice. They then all journey to the large tree in the whale forest entering a secret door in the tail which leads to a hidden underground chamber. When they reach it, they find a distraught Raizo who had been chained up to prevent him from giving himself up to Jack.
769	23	"A Red Stone! A Guide to the One Piece!"; Transliteration: "Akai Ishi! "Wan Pīsu" e no Michishirube" (Japanese: 赤い石！“ひとつなぎの大秘宝(ワンピース)”への道標)	Katsumi Tokoro	Tomohiro Nakayama	December 18, 2016	March 22, 2026
Kin'emon and Kanjuro soon arrive and unchain Raizo who is overjoyed to be reunited with them. Luffy, Usopp, Chopper and Franky are at first disappointed upon seeing the ninja but instantly change their minds after he shows off his impressive ninja skills. Meanwhile Robin investigates an unusual red Ponegliff lying within the chamber. After she finishes deciphering it she discovers coordinates to an unknown location. Dogstorm elaborates that it is called a Road Ponegliff and that there are four of them in the world, each with coordinates of a location. He explains that when those coordinates are placed on a map and aligned they reveal the location of Raftel, the last island at the end of the Grand Line and the place where Gol D. Roger hid the One Piece. Upon hearing this Luffy and the rest of the crew rejoice.
770	24	"The Secret of the Land of Wano! The Kozuki Family and the Ponegliffs!"; Transliteration: "Wano Kuni no Himitsu - Kōzuki-ke to Pōnegurifu" (Japanese: ワノ国の秘密 光月家と歴史の本文(ポーネグリフ))	Kentarō Fujita	Tomohiro Nakayama	December 25, 2016	March 29, 2026
Master Cat Viper tells Luffy that they currently are missing the location of only one of the road Ponegliffs. Of the four, one of the Road Ponegliffs is with Big Mom, while the other is with Kaido. The location of the fourth Ponegliff is unknown. Usopp suggests they sneak into Big Mom and Kaido's headquarters and steal a copy of the Road Ponegliffs (by painting and taking a stamp off the original). Robin is warned that the Emperors and the other pirates are only looking for the Ponegliffs at the moment, but none of them can decipher the Ponegliffs. Since Robin is the only one who can decipher them, she will be targeted for kidnapping. Robin says she's confident she'll be protected by her friends. Master Cat tells the crew that Kozuki clan were very skilled stone masons who were responsible for sculpting the Ponegliffs. Kozuki Oden was the last in the line of Kozuki who knew how to read the language inscribed on the Ponegliffss. Oden was executed by the current shogun of the Land of Wano and Kaido, Captain of the Beast Pirates since he had traveled to Raftel with Gol D. Roger. Meanwhile, Jack wakes up and is informed that Sheepshead is back onboard.
771	25	"A Vow Between Two Men! Luffy and Kozuki Momonosuke!"; Transliteration: "Otoko no Chikai - Rufi to Kōzuki Momonosuke" (Japanese: 男の誓い ルフィと光月モモの助)	Satoshi Itō	Atsuhiro Tomioka	January 8, 2017	April 5, 2026
After learning that Oden was a member of the Roger Pirates, the Straw Hats learned Kaido and the shogun are after Momonosuke and the others because they believe that Oden passed down the knowledge of Raftel to them. Kin'emon reveals that their intention is to take back Wano and open its borders by killing Kaido and the shogun. When Kin'emon asked Luffy for his help, he refused and demanded that Momonosuke speak for himself. After remembering his parents being killed by Kaido, Momonosuke tearfully states his desire to take him down and Luffy for help. Accepting his request, Luffy and Law form an alliance with the minks and the samurai to take down Kaido and the shogun.
772	26	"The Legendary Journey! The Dog and the Cat and the Pirate King!"; Transliteration: "Densetsu no Kōkai - Inu to Neko to Kaizoku-Ō!" (Japanese: 伝説の航海 イヌとネコと海賊王！)	Directed by : Yasunori Koyama; Storyboarded by : Tetsuya Endō	Shōji Yonemura	January 15, 2017	April 12, 2026
Though excited to fight Kaido with the Ninja-Pirate-Mink-Samurai Alliance, Luffy requests to rescue Sanji from Big Mom before the battle. Meanwhile, Jack has punished Sheepshead for returning to him without Raizo, and his fleet returns to Zou to attack it again. However, rather than take on the minks in battle again, Jack decides to attack the elephant Zunisha itself, shocking his crew. Back on Zou, the Ninja-Pirate-Mink-Samurai alliance heads back outside, and Duke Dogstorm and Cat Viper regale the Straw Hats with tales about their and Oden's travels with Whitebeard and later Roger. However, they did not reach Raftel with Roger, and Kin'emon states that Oden leaving Wano Country to go sailing was a crime. Nami then asks about Crocus' words on the Log Pose, as he stated that it would guide them to the final destination Raftel. However, Duke Dogstorm and Cat Viper reply that rather than leading them directly to Raftel, it will lead them to a place that will be integral to helping them reach Raftel beyond the end. As the alliance resumes talking about their plans to fight Kaido, Cat Viper states his intention to find Marco and the remaining Whitebeard Pirates as allies for the war.
773	27	"The Nightmare Returns! The Invincible Jack's Fierce Attack!"; Transliteration: "Akumu Futatabi - Fujimi no Jakku Kyōshū" (Japanese: 悪夢再び 不死身のジャック強襲)	Yoshihiro Ueda	Jin Tanaka	January 22, 2017	April 19, 2026
Luffy learned that the remaining Whitebeard Pirates went missing after suffering an overwhelming defeat by Blackbeard a year ago. Kin'emon plans to go back Wano and help their allies with Law's help to sneak back into the country. Luffy, Nami, Chopper, and Brook decide to set sail to rescue Sanji and take Big Mom's Road Ponegliff. As everyone finished with their plans, Zou starts to shake due to the Beast Pirates attack. Luffy and Momonosuke then hear an overwhelming voice inside their heads.
774	28	"A Battle to Defend Zou! Luffy and Zunesha!"; Transliteration: "Zō Bōeisen - Rufi to Zunīsha!" (Japanese: ゾウ防衛戦 ルフィとズニーシャ！)	Takashi Ōtsuka	Atsuhiro Tomioka	January 29, 2017	April 26, 2026
As Zou continues shaking, Luffy and Momonosuke hear an overwhelming voice inside their heads. Momonosuke realizes that Zunisha itself is talking to him, and sees that Zunisha is under attack by Jack and the Beasts Pirates. As the Musketeers and Guardians race off to deal with the enemy pirates, Zunisha receives a crippling blow and tells Momonosuke that it was once punished to walk the seas for eternity. Thus, it could not act against Jack unless given the order, and asks Momonosuke to do so. Momonosuke orders Zunisha to attack Jack, allowing the giant elephant to annihilate Jack's entire fleet with a single swing of its trunk. As the people on Zou recover from the attack, Scratchmen Apoo contacts Kaido to report the loss of Jack's fleet.
775	29	"Save Zunesha! The Straw Hat's Rescue Operation!"; Transliteration: "Zunīsha o Sukue - Mugiwara Resukyū Dai Sakusen!" (Japanese: 巨象(ズニーシャ)を救え 麦わら救急(レスキュー)大作戦！)	Masahiro Hosoda	Hirohiko Kamisaka	February 5, 2017	May 3, 2026
Zunisha, having been injured by Jack's assault, almost fell, which prompted everyone to work together to patch up his wound. Robin, Chopper, Brook, Zoro, and Kin'emon prepare the supplies while Nami looks at a map to find out how to reach Big Mom. Franky repairs some broken ships to be able to reach Zunisha's legs. A massive thundercloud appears suddenly without warning destroys the equipment supporting everyone trying to treat Zunisha. Before they fall into the sea, Luffy and Robin save them. When Luffy then takes a lot of food, Carrot tries to ask to come along with them but Luffy doesn't pay attention when he realizes he has to go and find Pekoms. Later, Carrot makes a decision.
776	30	"Saying Goodbye and Descending from the Elephant! Setting Out to Take Back Sanji!"; Transliteration: "Wakare no Gezō - Sanji Dakkan no Funade!" (Japanese: 別れの下象 サンジ奪還の船出！)	Yasunori Koyama	Tomohiro Nakayama	February 12, 2017	May 10, 2026
The group decides to break into four smaller groups, each with their own personal mission, before later converging at Wano Country. Cat Viper's group will search for Marco while Dogstorm's group stay in Zou to protect it in case of another attack with Momonosuke staying with them so he can try to communicate with Zunesha again. In the meantime, Luffy, Nami, Chopper, Brook and Pekoms will go to retrieve Sanji, while Kin'emon, Law, Kanjiro, Raizo and the rest of the Straw Hats and the Heart Pirates go to Wano. Luffy is shocked to find Pekom's dwelling has collapsed but thankfully the latter is unharmed thanks to his Turtle-Turtle fruit ability. Usopp gives Nami a new updated Clima-Tact and jaguar mink Pedro insists he would be the only one of the Mink Tribe to accompany Luffy's group as only he can keep Pekoms under control. Afterwards, Luffy's group descends to the Thousand Sunny, with their mission to get Sanji back as they set out for Totto Land. But to the Sanji Retrieval Team's horror and everyone else's, save the rest of the Straw Hats, shock (and Law's annoyance), Luffy grabs his team and jumps off Zou. Meanwhile at Alabasta, Princess Vivi prepares to head out to sea.
777	31	"To the Reverie! Princess Vivi and Princess Shirahoshi!"; Transliteration: "Reverī e - Ōjo Bibi to Shirahoshi Hime" (Japanese: 世界会議(レヴェリー)へ 王女ビビとしらほし姫)	Katsumi Tokoro	Shōji Yonemura	February 19, 2017	May 17, 2026
Various royal families begin their journey to the Reverie, such as the Alabasta royal family and aides where Vivi is excited about traveling out of sea after so long, Sabo's step-brother Stelly who is now the king of Goa Kingdom, and the Neptune royal family, where Shirahoshi is convinced to go by her father and brothers to accompany them. Meanwhile, as Luffy's group is exhausted from their wild exit from Zou and begin to set out for Totto Land, they find they have an unexpected stowaway who has decided to join their group, the Rabbit Mink Carrot.
778	32	"To the Reverie! Rebecca and the Sakura Kingdom!"; Transliteration: "Reverī e - Rebekka to Sakura Ōkoku" (Japanese: 世界会議(レヴェリー)へ レベッカとサクラ王国)	Yoshihiro Ueda	Shōji Yonemura	February 26, 2017	May 24, 2026
Despite Pedro's instance that they return to Zou to drop Carrot off, Carrot insists she will not get in the way. However, when Nami decides to cook in return for a large fee, Luffy decides to handle the cooking to avoid paying her, much to the horror of Brook and Chopper. Meanwhile other royal families set out for the Reverie, Dalton (with Kureha as his doctor) from the newly named Cherry Blossom Kingdom. Wapol, now king of the newly named Black Drum Kingdom, who reminisces on how after his defeat to Luffy ended up living on the streets where is Munch-Munch ability inadvertently allowed him to become a wealthy toy mogul and eventually regained his royal status, prepares for the Reverie (where he plans to get revenge against Dalton). The Dressrosa royal family also prepares with Rebecca accompanying them as a lady-in-waiting. Back on the Thousand Sunny, Brook gives Carrot a tour, while Pedro receives a new paper stating that the Revolutionary Army's headquarters has been devastated.
779	33	"Kaido Returns! An Imminent Threat to the Worst Generation!"; Transliteration: "Kaidō Futatabi - Kyōi Semaru Saiaku no Sedai!" (Japanese: カイドウ再び 脅威迫る最悪の世代！)	Directed by : Kentarō Fujita; Storyboarded by : Tetsuya Endō	Jin Tanaka	March 5, 2017	May 31, 2026
Pedro discovers the news regarding the attack on the Revolutionary Army's headquarters caused by the Blackbeard Pirates and when looking at the newspaper, Luffy sees his father Dragon's face for the first time. Despite Luffy's concern for Sabo, Pedro states it is more likely they are still alive and safe somewhere. However, this distraction and the fact Luffy left the stove on causes a gas explosion in the kitchen causing the meal Luffy planned to turn out awful, and that he also wasted a week's worth of food, leaving the team with no food. At Zou, Dogstorm worries over the fact the enemy might have a Vivre Card for Zou, while at the bottom of the sea, Jack (while immobile) is revealed to still be alive. Meanwhile, Kaido is enraged at Doflamingo's capture and swears revenge against the Worst Generation. It is also revealed he has captured one of them, Eustass Kid.
Marine Rookie
780	34	"A Hungry Front! Luffy and the Navy Rookies!"; Transliteration: "Harapeko Sensen - Rufi to Kaigun Rūkī!" (Japanese: 空腹(ハラペコ)戦線 ルフィと海軍超新星(ルーキー)！)	Satoshi Itō	Hirohiko Kamisaka	March 19, 2017	June 14, 2026
On the way to Whole Cake Island, the Sanji Retrieval Team becomes famished after running out of food. They come across Fron Island, where they stop to look for food, but they quickly find it is home to a Marine base. At the Marine base, a hotshot Marine Captain named All-Hunt Grount arrives for his new assignment, quickly exasperating his comrades and his commander, Vice Admiral Prodi. Grount then runs into Bonham, a member of the Longarm Tribe, and Zappa, who used to serve with him under Admiral Aokiji. Brook scares some Marines unconscious, so Luffy, Nami, Chopper, and Carrot don their outfits before heading back to the Shark Submerge III. Nami and Chopper plan to raid the food warehouse for supplies only to realize Luffy and Carrot had gone and snuck into the cafeteria to eat, with the former two following them. A lovestruck Zappa recognizes Nami and proposes to her, creeping her out and making her run away. Luffy continues eating; however, he's quickly recognized after an altercation by Prodi, who sends out an alert, and Grount excitedly prepares to fight Luffy.
781	35	"The Implacable Three! A Big Chase After the Straw Hats!"; Transliteration: "Shūnen no San-nin - Mugiwara Ichimi Dai Cheisu!" (Japanese: 執念の3人 麦わら一味大追撃戦(チェイス)！)	Yoshihiro Ueda	Tomohiro Nakayama	March 26, 2017	June 21, 2026
Luffy and Carrot continue eating as the former effortlessly fends off attacks from Marines Grount, Bonham, and Zappa. Brook's soul guides Luffy and Carrot to the food warehouse where they regroup with Nami and Chopper, only to be confronted by Grount, Bonham, and Zappa. Bonham battles Chopper, using his Breath Qigong technique to change his physique, but is beaten by the reindeer. Zappa attacks Luffy, intending to marry both Nami and Carrot, but is electrocuted by the two grossed-out women. Zappa then tries a flaming sword attack, but Luffy deflects it, causing a giant water pot to fall on the Marine and washing everyone else outside. Grount confronts Luffy again but is effortlessly overpowered and beaten. The Sanji Retrieval Team then races to the shore, only to be confronted by Vice Admiral Prodi, who's determined to take them down in order to avoid getting demoted.
782	36	"The Devil's Fist! A Show Down! Luffy vs. Grount!"; Transliteration: "Akuma no Kobushi - Kessen! Rufi tai Guranto" (Japanese: 悪魔の拳 決戦！ルフィVS(たい)グラント)	Directed by : Satoshi Itō; Storyboarded by : Tetsuya Endō	Jin Tanaka	April 2, 2017	June 28, 2026
Prodi fires at Brook and the Shark Submerge III before firing hake-infused shots from his bazooka at the group, while his men use rubber-coated shields to counter Nami's and Carrot's electrical attacks. However, the Sanji Retrieval Team beats them using physical attacks. Bonham and Zappa prepare to join the fight, but Grount, having lost his fighting spirit, refuses to come. After Bonham berates him, Zappa tells Grount to remember what Aokiji taught them. As Luffy manages to defeat Prodi, Bonham and Zappa confront him. Grount remembers how in his youth, after eating a Zoan Devil Fruit, his left arm transformed into a large, hairy red arm resembling a gorilla's, but ended up destroying an island due to not being able to control it, before being subdued by Aokiji, who trained him as a Marine. Years later, Aokiji tells Grount (who had his left arm contained in a metal attachment) that no matter how strong he is, he may still lose to powerful opponents, but it's what he does afterwards that matters. Back in the present, Luffy defeats Bonham and Zappa and prepares to leave Fron Island. However, he is confronted again by Grount, having regained his resolve, who shatters the attachment on his left arm to reveal its true form. Having trained all his life to control it, Grount wields its tremendous power against Luffy, but after a titanic struggle, Luffy eventually manages to overpower and defeat him. As the Sanji Retrieval Team finally leaves Fron Island, Grount laughs and remarks that Luffy was a worthy opponent. On the Thousand Sunny, the Sanji Retrieval Team eats all the rations taken from the base in ten minutes.

== Home media release ==
=== Japanese ===
Avex Pictures (Japan – Region 2/A)
Volume		Episodes	Release date	Ref.
18th Season Zou-hen	piece.01	751–754	January 11, 2017	
18th Season Zou-hen	piece.02	755–758	February 1, 2017	
18th Season Zou-hen	piece.03	759–762	March 1, 2017	
18th Season Zou-hen	piece.04	763–766	April 5, 2017	
18th Season Zou-hen	piece.05	767–770	May 3, 2017	
18th Season Zou-hen	piece.06	771–774	June 7, 2017	
18th Season Zou-hen	piece.07	775–778	July 5, 2017	
18th Season Zou-hen	piece.08	779–782	August 2, 2017	
One Piece Film Gold Eiga Rendō Tokubetsu-hen "Silver Mine"		747–750	December 28, 2016	
One Piece Log Collection	"Zou"	751–760	July 26, 2019	
One Piece Log Collection	"Mink"	761–771	August 30, 2019	
One Piece Log Collection	"Jack"	772–782	September 27, 2019	

=== English ===
Crunchyroll LLC (North America – Region 1/A); Madman Entertainment (Australia and New Zealand – Region 4/B)
Volume		Episodes	Release date			ISBN	Ref.
Volume		Episodes	NA	UK & IE	AUS & NZ	ISBN	Ref.
Season Twelve	Voyage One	747–758	October 4, 2022	N/A	December 6, 2023	ISBN N/A	
Season Twelve	Voyage Two	759–770	January 17, 2023	N/A	February 7, 2024	ISBN N/A	
Season Twelve	Voyage Three	771–782	March 21, 2023	N/A	N/A	ISBN N/A	
Collection	31	747–770	April 11, 2023	July 3, 2023	N/A	ISBN N/A	
Collection	32	771–794	August 8, 2023	September 4, 2023	N/A	ISBN N/A	
