= Lists of One Piece chapters =

The Straw Hats on the covers of chapters 999 and 1000.

Below is a list of List of One Piece chapters. There are several lists to list all the chapters.

== Lists of main series chapters ==
- List of One Piece chapters 1 to 186
- List of One Piece chapters 187 to 388
- List of One Piece chapters 389 to 594
- List of One Piece chapters 595 to 806
- List of One Piece chapters 807 to 1015
- List of One Piece chapters 1016 to current

== Special chapters ==
Number	Original title	English title	Jump issue	Release date	Pages
0	"ストロングワールド"	"Chapter 0: Strong World "	#53 (2009)	November 30, 2009	23
Mangaka: Eiichiro Oda
Plot: Three years before the beginning of the One Piece series, the Shiki and the Roger Pirates have made contact in the New World. Vice-Admiral Monkey D. Garp, receiving the news, heads off with Fleet-Admiral Sengoku to meet them. While in the New World the Roger Pirates prepare to clash with Shiki and his Golden Lion Pirates. Shiki asks Roger to join him and give Shiki his knowledge of an ancient weapon, but Roger refuses and eventually the two crews clash. Years later, after Roger becomes the King of Pirates, Shiki discovers that Roger is about to be executed. Hearing this, he heads to Marineford where he believes Rogers would be held, but is defeated by Garp and Sengoku, and sent to the underwater prison Impel Down. Shiki later manages to escape and begins plotting his revenge on the island of Merveille in the Grand Line. At the same time, many of the events that take place in the current One Piece story are beginning, such as the beginning of the Red Hair Pirates and the dawn of the Great Age of Pirates. Cover story: N/A; Collected: One Piece Box Set 2 Anime: The chapter was animated into an episode of the One Piece anime by Toei in April 2010, named One Piece Film Strong World: Episode 0. Note: Was released with One Piece chapter 565 and was created to be a tie-in to the film Strong World.

== Canon content from other manga ==
Number	Original title	English title	Jump issue	Release date	Pages
One-Shot	"MONSTERS"	"Monsters"	Autumn Special 1994	1994	45
Mangaka: Eiichiro Oda
Plot: A wandering samurai named Ryuma travels to a small town, where he meets a young woman named Flare; he befriends her after she saves his life by giving him food. While there he also encounters another swordsman by the name of Cyrano whom he challenges for a battle, but is stopped by Flare, who explains to him that the Cyrano is the local town's hero because he saved her from a dragon that destroyed her mountain village years ago; she also tells Ryuma that he is the second greatest swordsmaster in the world, behind only the one known as "The King". Ryuma refrains from fighting Cyrano and instead goes for a walk. While on the walk he accidentally bumps into D.R., who screams and accuses Ryuma of stabbing him. D.R. blows a horn which he claims will summon the dragon and then seemingly dies. The dragon attacks the city and Flare and Ryuma discover that Cyrano and D.R. are busy looting the town for riches instead of fighting the dragon. It is revealed that Cyrano and D.R. were behind the dragon attack years ago as well and Ryuma decides to fight them and kill the dragon. He defeats both quickly and then leaves the town. In the end it is revealed that Ryuma is the one known as "The King". Cover story: N/A; Collected: Wanted! Anime: Adapted as Monsters: 103 Mercies Dragon Damnation by E&H Production, released on Medialink and Netflix in January 2024; Note: The character of Ryuma reappears in One Piece. Eiichiro Oda has confirmed the story as canon to One Piece. (Note: Fan: Question for you!! Is the swordsman "Ryuma" who was once said to have defeated a dragon the very same Ryuma that starred in the short story "Monsters" from your collection volume entitled "Wanted!"? He is, isn't he? I'm so desperate to know, I can't brush my teeth. If I get a cavity, I'll tell the dentist it was your fault. Oda: Well, here are two questions about my old short story collection, "Wanted!" I'll tackle Ryuma's first. The zombie Ryuma appears in Chapter 450 from this volume, and he is indeed the Ryuma who starred in "Monsters".)

== List of non-canon chapters ==
=== Early One Piece ===
Number	Original title	English title	Jump issue	Release date	Pages
1a	"ロマンス ドーン"	"Romance Dawn", version 1	Summer Special 1996	4 August 1996	50
Mangaka: Eiichiro Oda
Plot: Monkey D. Luffy, a young pirate arrive in a village where he encounters a young swordswoman named Silk, together they have to defeat a pirate named Crescent-Moon Galley. Luffy's backstory is also shown within a flashback. Cover story: N/A; Collected: One Piece Box Set 1 Anime: Chapter was adapted into an OVA to commemorate the 40th anniversary of Shonen Jump on November 24, 2008. Note This work was the first ever appearance of the characters of Monkey D. Luffy and Red Haired Shanks.
1b	"ロマンス ドーン"	"Romance Dawn", version 2	#41 (1996)	23 September 1996	45
Mangaka: Eiichiro Oda
Plot: Monkey D. Luffy, a young pirate travels on the sea in a small skiff. He encounters a girl named Ann who has a giant bird whom a sorcerer pirate named Spiel the Hexagon is trying to steal from her. Together they have to defeat him to save Ann's bird. Luffy's backstory is shown in a flashback, it is shown that Luffy was given his strawhat by his pirate grandfather. Cover story: N/A; Collected: One Piece Box Set 1, Wanted! Anime: Chapter was adapted into an episode to commemorate the 20th anniversary of the anime on October 20, 2019. Note This publication is the first appearance of Luffy's grandfather, the character was changed substantially from the early version to the main series, in the main series he is a Marine as opposed to a pirate.

=== Alternate reality stories ===
Story	Original title	English title	Published	Release date	Pages
What if?	Special Episode "Luff" part 1	Special Episode "Luff" part 1	One Piece Magazine #1	2017	13-16
Mangaka: Eiichiro Oda
Plot: The story examines what would have happened if Luffy's brother Sabo has appeared at the end of the summit war and saved the life of their brother Ace. Cover story: N/A; Collected: N/A; Anime: N/A
What if?	Special Episode "Luff" part 2	Special Episode "Luff" part 2	One Piece Magazine #2	2017	13-16
Mangaka: Eiichiro Oda
Plot: The story examines what would have happened if Luffy's brother Sabo has appeared at the end of the summit war and saved the life of their brother Ace. Cover story: N/A; Collected: N/A; Anime: N/A
What if?	Special Episode "Luff" part 3	Special Episode "Luff" part 3	One Piece Magazine #3	2017	13-16
Mangaka: Eiichiro Oda
Plot: The story examines what would have happened if Luffy's brother Sabo has appeared at the end of the summit war and saved the life of their brother Ace. Cover story: N/A; Collected: N/A; Anime: N/A

=== One Piece crossovers ===
With	Original title	English title	Jump #	Release date	Pages
Dragon Ball	"CROSS EPOCH"	"Cross Epoch"	#?	December 25, 2006	20
Mangakas: Eiichiro Oda and Akira Toriyama
Plot: The character of Shenlong, who has just granted Mr. Satan's wish with the Dragon Balls to become a king, has invited his friends for a party. Various characters from Dragon Ball and One Piece all respectively try to make their way to the party. Cover story: N/A; Collected: One Piece Box Set 3 Anime: N/A
Toriko	"実食! 悪魔の実!!"	"Taste of the Devil Fruit"	#?	April 4, 2011	19
Mangakas: Eiichiro Oda and Mitsutoshi Shimabukuro
Plot: Luffy, on an island named Gourmet Island provides, meets Toriko who has discovered what seems to be a Devil Fruit. Toriko explains that he wants to know what a Devil Fruit tastes like, Luffy tells him that a Devil Fruit tastes very bad. Despite this and their associated curse, Toriko nonetheless wishes to eat it. He eventually does after his friend cooks it. Toriko and Luffy have a party where he eats it, but he finds out that it was not actually a Devil Fruit. Cover story: N/A; Collected: One Piece Box Set 3 Anime: N/A; Note: This crossover was published together with One Piece chapter 619.

== See also ==
- List of One Piece manga volumes
