= One Piece season 17 =

Season of television series

One Piece
- Season 17; Dressrosa
- Cover art for the first home media volume of the season as released by Avex Pictures
- No. of episodes: 118

Release
- Original network: Fuji Television
- Original release: January 19, 2014 – June 19, 2016

Season chronology
- ← Previous; Season 16 Next → Season 18

The seventeenth season of the One Piece anime television series was produced by Toei Animation, and directed by Hiroaki Miyamoto and Toshinori Fukuzawa. The season began broadcasting in Japan on Fuji Television from January 19, 2014, to June 19, 2016. It compiles 118 episodes, making it the second longest season of the series. Like the rest of the series, it follows the adventures of Monkey D. Luffy and his Straw Hat Pirates. The first DVD compilation of this season was released on July 2, 2014, with individual volumes being released monthly. Funimation began releasing their English dub of the season through VOD on December 1, 2020.

The season covers the "Dressrosa" story arc, which adapts material beginning from the end of the 70th volume to the middle of the 80th volume of the original manga series of the same name by Eiichiro Oda. The Straw Hats land in Dressrosa, an island controlled by the warlord Donquixote Doflamingo. Upon learning of Doflamingo's conquering of the kingdom, the Straw Hats team up with the Revolutionaries and the kingdom's deposed princess Viola to overthrow Doflamingo and save Dressrosa.

This season makes use of two pieces of theme music. The opening theme songs are "Wake Up!", performed by AAA (Note: Pronounced as "Triple A") for the first 58 episodes, and "Hard Knock Days", performed by Generations from Exile Tribe for the remainder of the season.

== Episodes ==
No. overall (Note: Episode number by Toei Animation's count)	No. in season	Title (Note: Title of the episode: literally translated, romanized using Hepburn romanization, and in kanji form)	Directed by	Written by	Original release date (Note: Date the episode originally aired on Fuji Television)	English air date
629	1	"Startling! The Big News Shakes Up the New World!"; Transliteration: "Gekishin! Shin Sekai Ugokasu Dai-nyūsu" (Japanese: 激震！新世界動かす大ニュース)	Yoshihiro Ueda	Hirohiko Kamisaka	January 19, 2014	September 17, 2023
The world learns Doflamingo's resignation from the warlords in the daily news. Luffy threatens Doflamingo through the Transponder Snail to which the latter retaliates by stating he possesses something Luffy wants badly. Law explains his plan for the factory's destruction. During a meeting at Marine HQ, Buggy is shown to have become a Warlord during the time-skip. In order to deal with Doflamingo, Luffy, and Law, Akainu dispatches Fujitora. At Dressrosa, during a meeting with the top members of the Donquixote Pirates, Doflamingo is shown to have Ace's former Devil Fruit; the Flame-Flame Fruit.
630	2	"Explore! A Kingdom of Love and Passion - Dressrosa!"; Transliteration: "Bōken! Ai to Jōnetsu no Kuni Doresurōza" (Japanese: 冒険！愛と情熱の国ドレスローザ)	Hiroaki Miyamoto	Hirohiko Kamisaka	January 26, 2014	September 17, 2023
The Straw Hat Pirates, Law, Kin'emon and Momonosuke arrive at Dressrosa. There they divide into three groups: Luffy, Sanji, Zoro, Kin'emon, and Franky head into town; Momonosuke, Chopper, Nami, and Brook protect the Sunny; and Law, Usopp and Robin deliver Caesar Clown. Group 1 goes to a restaurant where they see a blind man gambling with a great amount of wealth. Then, some of Doflamingo's men start to take advantage of his blindness and cheat him out of his money. The episode ends with him betting all his winnings.
631	3	"Full of Enthusiasm! The Corrida Colosseum!"; Transliteration: "Nekkyō Uzumaku - Korīda Koroshiamu" (Japanese: 熱狂渦巻く コリーダコロシアム)	Masahiro Hosoda	Shōji Yonemura	February 2, 2014	September 24, 2023
Doflamingo's underlings take advantage of the old man's blindness to steal his earnings. Luffy intervenes by telling him that he was deceived. Enraged, the thugs attack Luffy only to be defeated by the old man who uses a gravity-based power. Before he leaves, Luffy interrogates him about his identity to which, he replies that for their sake he should not reply. Meanwhile, Zoro's sword Shusui alongside other belongings are stolen by 'fairies'. Noticing the edge of the sword Zoro, Sanji, and Kin'emon go after the thief. During the pursuit, Kin'emon is separated from the group. While interrogating the leader of the thugs defeated earlier about the SMILE factory, Luffy and Franky are told about the Corrida Colosseum event. Luffy mistakes the grand prize for meat. At the opening ceremony, the Flame-Flame Fruit is introduced to the public. The old man is shown among the spectators. The news shocks Luffy.
632	4	"A Dangerous Love! The Dancer Girl - Violet!"; Transliteration: "Kiken na Koi - Odoriko Vaioretto" (Japanese: 危険な恋 踊り娘ヴァイオレット)	Katsumi Tokoro	Yoshiyuki Suga	February 9, 2014	September 24, 2023
As Zoro searches for his missing katana, Sanji finds himself face-to-face with a beautiful dancer named Violet who requires his services for a dire matter. Meanwhile, Luffy and Franky, in pursuit of the Flame-Flame Fruit, arrive at the Corrida Colosseum. As Luffy is about to sign up for the tournament, they encounter a strange, one-legged toy soldier.
633	5	"A Formidable, Unknown Warrior! Here Comes Lucy!"; Transliteration: "Saikyō no Mumei Senshi! Rūshī Tōjō" (Japanese: 最強の無名戦士！ルーシー登場)	Tetsuya Endō	Shōji Yonemura	February 16, 2014	October 1, 2023
Luffy signs up for the tournament, and Franky requests that Luffy not let anyone discover who he is, so after a near mishap, he becomes 'Lucy', registered with the '0556' number on the back of his shirt. Luffy and Franky get separated with Thunder Soldier looking at a board. Franky then asks Thunder Soldier about the Don Quixote family and a 'factory', much to Thunder Soldier's surprise. Meanwhile, Sanji is with Violet, wandering around Dressrosa. Luffy defeats Spartan after he tries to punch him several times, nearly getting disqualified, until a fighter named Sai explains that Spartan was the one who started the fight. Also, the Funk Brothers argue with Dagama, claiming he's 'forming alliances' in his block. The episode ends with Luffy searching for a new armor with Cavendish appearing, telling Lucy there is a weight limit.
634	6	"A Pirate Noble! Cavendish!"; Transliteration: "Kaizoku Kikōshi Kyabendisshu" (Japanese: 海賊貴公子 キャベンディッシュ)	Aya Komaki	Tomohiro Nakayama	February 23, 2014	October 1, 2023
The famous beautiful pirate Cavendish makes an entrance and proceeds to explain to Luffy the rules of entertainment in the Colosseum, the nature and appeal of bloodsport, his past as a world-shaking pirate and lastly his intent to kill The Worst Generation for stealing his spotlight two years ago. While Luffy stares in awe at a great stone statue of a warrior, a gladiator, Rebecca, arrives and explains to him the legend of Kyros the Undefeated who disappeared from battle for 20 years. The announcer then calls out that the Block A battle royale is over and a champion has been decided, a large man with a paper bag over his head. To the surprise of the entire Colosseum, the man removes the bag and reveals himself to be Jesus Burgess, the captain of the first ship of the Blackbeard Pirates. Meanwhile, the Thunder Soldier takes Franky to a private place so they can discuss Franky's "job". While the Navy notices that there are several competitors in the competition, the blind man is revealed to be Admiral Fujitora. Just then, Luffy is confronted by Bellamy.
635	7	"The Fateful Reunion! Bellamy the Hyena!"; Transliteration: "Unmei no Saikai - Haiena no Beramī" (Japanese: 運命の再会 ハイエナのベラミー)	Directed by : Takahiro Imamura; Storyboarded by : Kenji Yokoyama	Shōji Yonemura	March 2, 2014	October 8, 2023
The Caesar handover team learn about Green Bit, Law is perplexed on why the citizens are so calm despite Doflamingo stepping down as king. They are then shocked to discover that agents from Cipher Pol Aegis 0, who are even more dangerous than CP9, are in Dressrosa. On the Sunny, the four who are watching the ship hear noises from inside.
636	8	"A Super Rookie! Bartolomeo the Cannibal!"; Transliteration: "Chōshinsei! Hitokui no Barutoromeo" (Japanese: 超新星！人食いのバルトロメオ)	Yoshihiro Ueda	Jin Tanaka	March 16, 2014	October 8, 2023
The Block B battle begins. Bartolomeo is heckled by the crowd as he enters the colosseum. He responds by throwing a fake bomb into the stands. Cavendish tells Luffy about the competitors and reveals that he's hoping some of the Worst Generation enter the tournament so he can kill them. Meanwhile, Bellamy defeats a number of competitors in quick succession, only to be targeted by an alliance formed by Dagama in order to protect King Elizabello II. Luffy and Cavendish are approached by Chin Jao who asks how Garp is doing, inadvertently revealing Luffy's true identity to Cavendish.
637	9	"Big Names Duke It Out! The Heated Block B Battle!"; Transliteration: "Gun'yū-kakkyo! Hakunetsu no Bī-Burokku!" (Japanese: 群雄割拠！白熱のB(ビー)ブロック！)	Katsumi Tokoro	Hirohiko Kamisaka	March 23, 2014	October 15, 2023
With his true identity exposed, Luffy tries to defend himself from Chin Jao's devastating headbutts and Cavendish's irrational hatred while trying in vain to convince them he's "Lucy". Luckily, Chin Jao's grandsons manage to intervene and halt Chin Jao's rampage before he gets disqualified. They convinced him that they should focus on the "real prize" and that since Luffy is in Block C, they can kill him in the ring without repercussions. Cavendish, however, intends to kill Luffy before the match and proceeds to hunt down Luffy, who escaped the fight and is hiding outside, hanging underneath the stands window. At the Battle Royale, only 30 combatants remain in the ring with the numbers being further reduced with the defeat of the captain of Dressrosa's Royal Guard, Tank Lepanto, by former bounty hunters, Abdullah and Jeet who are in turn defeated by Bellamy. However, much to everyone's disgust, Bartolomeo proceeds to urinate in the water in front of the audience. Fish-man Hack sees this as a vulgar display and attacks him from behind, but somehow his attack was nullified and his arm broken and bleeding while Bartolomeo remains unscathed, leaving everyone who witnessed this shocked and confused at what happened.
638	10	"A Deadly Blow! The Astonishing King Punch!"; Transliteration: "Ichigeki-hissatsu! Kyōi no Kingu Panchi" (Japanese: 一撃必殺！驚異のキング・パンチ)	Ayako Hiraike	Yoshiyuki Suga	March 30, 2014	October 15, 2023
With Hack defeated and the remaining fighters reduced to 24, the battle royale is nearly over. Bellamy faces off Bartolomeo while at the same time Blue Gilly defeats Ricky. The bribed fighters protecting Elizabello II guard themselves from Blue Gilly's assault but were backstabbed by Dagama who revealed that Blue Gilly was his partner, but Dagama secretly plans to betray Blue Gilly. However, the long-legged martial artist never trusted the tactical schemer and quickly knocks him out of the ring. Bellamy is currently struggling against Bartolomeo while at the same time, Elizabello II is cornered but is fully prepared to unleash his devastating punch. The audience heard of the fighting king's reputation and proceeds to get out of the way of his punch. When Blue Gilly moves in for the kill, the king delivers the punch at point blank, creating a destructive shockwave throughout the ring. When the smoke cleared, Elizabello II and Bartolomeo were the only ones standing with the latter revealing his Bari-Bari Fruit which allows him to create barriers by crossing his fingers and the former being defeated by that power. Bartolomeo is now the champion of the Block B battle royale. Meanwhile, Franky is informed by Thunder Soldier that he too is part of an operation to destroy the SMILE factory but needs the cyborg's help in rescuing the workers held prisoner there. The toy soldier then prepares to tell Franky the history of Dressrosa.
639	11	"The Fighting Fish Strike! Across the Deadly Iron Bridge!"; Transliteration: "Tōgyo Shūrai! Shi no Tekkyō o Toppa Seyo" (Japanese: 闘魚襲来！死の鉄橋を突破せよ)	Directed by : Takashi Ōtsuka; Storyboarded by : Hiroaki Miyamoto	Shōji Yonemura	April 6, 2014	November 12, 2023
The episode starts with a previous flashback of the Block B match, depictions including the King Punch and Bartolomeo's victory, much to the resentment of the crowd. Luffy is seen still hanging, and slingshots his way into the building after watching Bartolomeo win. He walks to the main entrance where the injured fighters are being carried off. He converses with an injured Bellamy, who acknowledges Luffy's strength and use of Haki. When he calls Luffy "Straw Hat", Bartolomeo hears this and is shocked. Later, it is announced that the Block C match is about to start. The scene changes to Trafalgar Law and his group, who are about to cross the bridge. They are attacked by a school of Fighting fish but manages to get to Green Bit safely. Law is revealed to have Caesar's heart, the latter who is freed of his bonds for help. They also witness strange voices at a point on the bridge. Green Bit is shown to be a dense jungle. The plot shifts to Sanji's location, where he and Violet arrives at the next town. Sanji attacks some thugs in a warehouse and disposes of them easily. When the two recent lovebirds share a moment, Violet cuffs Sanji and is revealed to know Sanji's true identity as Black Leg, much to Sanji's astonishment.
640	12	"Explore! Fairies' Island - Green Bit!"; Transliteration: "Bōken! Yōsei no Shima Gurīn Bitto" (Japanese: 冒険！妖精の島グリーンビット)	Directed by : Yoshihiro Ueda; Storyboarded by : Yutaka Uemura	Tomohiro Nakayama	April 13, 2014	November 19, 2023
Upon arriving at Green Bit, the group spots a crashed Marine ship and assumes the navy is on the island. With 14 minutes left before the exchange, Robin and Usopp scout while Law escorts Caesar to the meeting point. In the forest, Robin and Usopp witness the navy being attacked by unseen assailants, losing all of their belongings. Robin captures the swift thieves using her Devil Fruit powers and suspects they are dwarves. Meanwhile in Acacia, Zoro catches his sword thief: Wicca, a dwarf, who explains that dwarves "take" items as gifts for protecting nurturing Dressrosa's greenery. Despite spraining her ankle, she insists Zoro take her to the flower field to report that the Donquixote family plans to attack the Straw Hats' ship. Zoro, notoriously bad with directions, agrees. Elsewhere, Sanji is revealed to have been beaten by Violet, who turns out to be an assassin sent to interrogate him about Law's plan. Using her Glare-Glare Fruit powers, she reads Sanji's mind but is overwhelmed by his perverted thoughts. Despite the injuries the foot soldiers sustain on him, Sanji tells her that he believed in her tears, moving Violet to genuine tears in return.
641	13	"The Unknown World! The Tontatta Kingdom!"; Transliteration: "Shirarezaru Sekai - Tontatta Ōkoku" (Japanese: 知られざる世界 トンタッタ王国)	Directed by : Toshinori Fukuzawa; Storyboarded by : Aya Komaki	Hirohiko Kamisaka	April 20, 2014	November 19, 2023
Robin finds herself captured by dwarves after they knocked her and Usopp unconscious. When Robin awakens, she cannot move due to the dwarf Leo using his Stitch-Stitch powers to sew her to the ground. When she tells them that she will not harm them, the dwarves released her leaving her baffled at them being so trusting. With Sanji, who's barely conscious, tells Violet that he never doubted her tears, leaving her genuinely shocked. Before her subordinates could kill Sanji, she quickly defeated them and proceeded to warn Sanji of the grand deception Doflamingo and the World Government pulled. At the colosseum, the C block battle royale has started, and Luffy is excited to win this for the prize. At the exchange site, Law received a call from Sanji, who attempts to warn Law about something he just heard from Violet.
642	14	"The Stratagem of the Century! Doflamingo Makes His Move!"; Transliteration: "Seiki no Bōryaku - Dofuramingo Ugoku" (Japanese: 世紀の謀略 ドフラミンゴ動く！)	Masahiro Hosoda	Jin Tanaka	April 27, 2014	November 26, 2023
While evading members of the Donquixote family with Violet, Sanji contacts Law via the Transponder Snail to tell him that Doflamingo did not resign from the Warlords and tells Law to leave Green Bit. However, it is too late as the Navy, Fujitora, and Doflamingo get to the exchange point as well. Back at the Colosseum, the next rounds begins but Luffy struggles to hide his powers.
643	15	"Shaking Heaven and Earth! Admiral Fujitora's Power!"; Transliteration: "Tenchi Yurugasu! Taishō Fujitora no Jitsuryoku" (Japanese: 天地ゆるがす！大将藤虎の実力)	Yoshihiro Ueda	Yoshiyuki Suga	May 4, 2014	November 26, 2023
Admiral Fujitora and Donquixote Doflamingo prepare to fight Trafalgar Law, who is trying to stall them long enough for the Straw Hats to accomplish their missions. Fujitora demonstrates his Devil Fruit powers over gravity by summoning a meteor. Violet splits up from Sanji, who reunites with Kin'emon. Franky gets a call from Sanji complaining about letting Luffy enter the Corrida Colosseum tournament. In the Colosseum, Luffy tames the Fighting Bull. Usopp and Robin learn from the dwarves that Montblanc Noland came to their island in the past and is considered a hero by them. Usopp lies to the dwarves that he is a descendant of Noland, only for them to ask for his help in defeating the Donquixote Pirates.
644	16	"A Blow of Anger! A Giant vs. Lucy!"; Transliteration: "Ikari no Ichigeki! Kyojin tai Rūshī" (Japanese: 怒りの一撃！巨人VS(たい)ルーシー)	Tetsuya Endō	Shōji Yonemura	May 11, 2014	December 3, 2023
The Straw Hats onboard the Thousand Sunny find themselves in a predicament as they were under attack by the Doflamingo Family led by Giolla who transformed the crew as well as the ship into abstract art with her Art-Art Fruit powers. Giolla reveals that their goal is to capture Momonosuke and since the ship is deformed the Straw Hats have no way of leaving Dressrosa. In the Colosseum, Bellamy receives a second chance to earn Doflamingo's favor by assassinating Luffy. Ricky refuses to be treated with the injured but gives in when he meets Rebecca who he seems to remember as a child. Luffy is becoming a crowd favorite when he tamed Fighting Bull and is riding the beast all around the ring. Unfortunately, they bumped into Hajrudin, a giant from Elbaf who proceeds to crush Lucy as well as the Bull. Though Luffy was unharmed, his new friend was not, and Luffy furiously delivered a Haki infused punch on the giant's face, knocking him out of the tournament.
645	17	"Destruction Cannon Blasts! Lucy in Trouble!"; Transliteration: "Hakai-hō Sakuretsu! Rūshī Kiki-ippatsu" (Japanese: 破壊砲炸裂！ルーシー危機一髪)	Katsumi Tokoro	Jin Tanaka	May 18, 2014	December 3, 2023
The battle royale heats up as more fighters continue to drop one after another and the strongest and most infamous fighters begin to face each other. The standouts among the remaining infamous fighters include "Destruction Cannon" Ideo, Jean "The Bandit" Ango, the Funk Brothers Kelly and Bobby, the Flower Country's Hasshoken masters and naval warriors Chinjao, Sai and Boo, and finally Lucy, who is becoming a popular underdog. The audience and commentator Gatz are a mixture of shock and awe by the power and brutality of each fighter's signature skills and techniques, and the question on everybody's mind is which one of these powerhouses will come out on top and earn the right to challenge the other three champions for the Flame-Flame Fruit.
646	18	"The Legendary Pirate! Don Chin Jao!"; Transliteration: "Densetsu no Kaizoku - Don Chinjao!" (Japanese: 伝説の海賊 首領・チンジャオ！)	Aya Komaki	Tomohiro Nakayama	May 25, 2014	December 10, 2023
The competition at Block C of the Corrida Colosseum is winding down as Lucy squares off against Jean the Bandit to get back his helmet, while others like Kelly Funk, Chinjao, and Ideo start to easily take out other competitors. After Jean tries to throw stolen weapons at Lucy, only to hit Chinjao instead, resulting in the latter to knock Jean out. Kelly Funk uses his Jacket-Jacket fruit power to let his brother Booby Funk to wear him, letting Kelly to control Bobby's strength to beat Boo, but is easily defeated by Sai who prepares to face off against Ideo. Outside of Dressrosa, the Straw Hat Pirates are still dealing with Giolla and the Donquixote Pirates and back in the Colosseum, the final two of Block C is revealed to be Lucy and Chinjao, who both clash with Conqueror's Haki.
647	19	"Light and Shadow! Darkness Behind Dressrosa!"; Transliteration: "Hikari to Kage - Doresurōza ni Hisomu Yami!" (Japanese: 光と影 ドレスローザに潜む闇！)	Directed by : Ayako Hiraike; Storyboarded by : Yutaka Uemura	Yoshiyuki Suga	June 1, 2014	December 10, 2023
In the Colosseum, Chinjao tells Luffy that the King of the Pirates must conquer all conquerors of the New World, then tearfully demands answers about Garp's past actions — though Luffy is clueless. Outside, Sanji and Kin'emon watch Luffy's match in disguise while observing the numerous marines surrounding the colosseum waiting to arrest any criminal that exits the stadium. However, not a single loser of the battle royales comes out, confusing even the present Vice Admiral Bastille over what's happening inside. Meanwhile, Thunder Soldier tells Franky that ten years ago, Doflamingo enforced a strict divide between humans and toys. He reveals that all toys were once humans, forgotten by their loved ones after being transformed by a Devil Fruit user brought to the island by Doflamingo. At Green Bit, Law struggles to defend against Issho and Doflamingo's combined assault, causing tremors felt in the Tontatta Kingdom. Mistaking the shockwaves as being Usopp's Haki, the dwarves explain to him their war with Doflamingo: 500 of their people, including their princess, are enslaved in his "dark factory". Their mission is to rescue the captives and destroy the factory, which is located directly beneath the Colosseum where Luffy is currently fighting.
648	20	"Making a Sortie! The Legendary Hero Usoland!"; Transliteration: "Shutsugeki - Densetsu no Hīrō Usorando" (Japanese: 出撃 伝説のヒーローウソランド)	Directed by : Tetsuya Endō; Storyboarded by : Kenji Yokoyama	Tomohiro Nakayama	June 8, 2014	December 17, 2023
Usopp, Robin and their dwarf allies are preparing for battle with the Donquixote Pirates to rescue their 500 captured comrades. As they leave, Gancho reveals to the two that the dwarves' past with Dressrosa began over 900 years ago. Meanwhile in Dressrosa, there exists a field of sunflowers and below the field, Thunder Soldier and Franky are rallying several toys. It is revealed that they are in an alliance with the dwarves. Franky also discovers that Zoro is there as well and that he is watching the C block battle royale fight between Luffy and Chinjao. Back at the Sunny, Nami is fending off Giolla but finds her Clima-Tact turned into a yet another piece of art as Giolla reveals that she ate the Art-Art Fruit and became an art human. At Green Bit, the fight between Doflamingo and Law is still going on with Law being barely able to keep up with Doflamingo's might. Back at the Corrida Colosseum, Jesus Burgess approaches Bartolomeo and Cavendish, wondering who "the little runt" is.
649	21	"The Fierce Battle Coming to the End! Lucy vs. Chin Jao!"; Transliteration: "Gekisen Ketchaku - Rūshī tai Chinjao" (Japanese: 激戦決着 ルーシーVS(たい)チンジャオ)	Yoshihiro Ueda	Jin Tanaka	June 15, 2014	January 14, 2024
Luffy's battle with Chinjao rages forward as they both use Busoshoku Haki in the ongoing fight. During the match, Chinjao explains and then occurs a flashback when his head was functioning like a powerful drill. After some time, he lost a duel against Garp and had his drill suppressed in his head, which eventually was the main factor towards losing his fame, money and power. After the flashback, Luffy and Chinjao prepared for their final showdown when the latter mocks Ace's death. At the ending, Luffy delivers a punch imbued with Busoshoku Haki towards Chinjao's head, which brings back his drill-shaped head back. Chinjao falls unconscious and breaks the platform into two as a result of his drill coming back. Lucy is declared as winner of Block C.
650	22	"Luffy and the Gladiator of Fate - Rebecca!"; Transliteration: "Rufi to Shukumei no Ken Tōshi Rebekka" (Japanese: ルフィと宿命の剣闘士レベッカ)	Masahiro Hosoda	Shōji Yonemura	June 22, 2014	January 21, 2024
As Luffy leaves the ring after winning Block C of the tournament, he is attacked by Cavendish. Bartolomeo reveals he's a big admirer of Luffy ever since the events in Logue Town and have been following the Straw Hats exploits ever since. Meanwhile Chinjao attempts to thank Luffy for restoring his head. Luffy escapes and is found by Rebecca, who buys him food. As they hide, Luffy overhears Jesus Burgess talking to his captain, Blackbeard, and tells the Emperor that he will not let him have Ace's devil fruit. As Rebecca and Luffy talk, she reveals some of her past.
651	23	"Protect You to the End! Rebecca and the Toy Soldier!"; Transliteration: "Mamorinuku! Rebekka to Omocha no Heitai" (Japanese: 守り抜く！レベッカとおもちゃの兵隊)	Toshinori Fukuzawa	Yoshiyuki Suga	June 29, 2014	January 28, 2024
This episode shows the flashback of Rebecca's past of when she was little while she is walking towards the stage of the colosseum for the battle between Block D. Her mother dies when Rebecca says that she is hungry, for not eating for two days because of escaping from the people hunting down for former nobilities. She leaves Rebecca in an area, saying that she will be back with food. Unfortunately, her mother was discovered by the hunters and was killed. The soldier carries her mom back, saying that even though he could not protect her mother, he will protect Rebecca forever until he meets his death. The rest of the episode shows how Rebecca is protected for the next few years after her mother's death. At the end, it goes back to the present when Rebecca walks onto the stage and is booed by the audience. Lucy gets angry and says that she is a nice person, and one of the prisoners reply saying that everyone despises her because of her grandfather, the former King who destroyed the country many years ago.
652	24	"The Last - and Bloodiest - Block! Block D Battle Begins!"; Transliteration: "Saigo no Chō Gekisen Ku - Dī-Burokku Kaisen" (Japanese: 最後の超激戦区 D(ディー)ブロック開戦)	Katsumi Tokoro	Shōji Yonemura	July 6, 2014	February 4, 2024
At the Corrida Colosseum, the crowd continues to taunt Rebecca until Cavendish shouts at them to stop their shameful jeers. Rebecca thanks him but he reminds her that in the ring, they are enemies. When the gong rings, the Battle Royale officially starts. Meanwhile, Law continues to struggle with Doflamingo and Fujitora and is swiftly defeated while Doflamingo decides to tell Law more about himself. At the Flower Field secret base, Leo and Thunder Soldier deliver their speech to the assembled army to prepare for the upcoming battle. Meanwhile in Dressrosa, Zoro is trying to find his way to Nami but runs into Kin'emon and Sanji, who were on their way to inform Luffy of the situation. Violet then shows up in disguise and informs them of their ship being already taken towards Green Bit. At the Colosseum, Rebecca is ganged up by five warriors but defeats all of them while tossing them out of the ring declaring she'll win the Flame-Flame Fruit and kill Doflamingo.
653	25	"A Decisive Battle! Giolla vs. the Straw Hats!"; Transliteration: "Kessen! Jōra tai Mugiwara no Ichimi" (Japanese: 決戦！ジョーラVS(たい)麦わらの一味)	Tetsuya Endō	Tomohiro Nakayama	July 13, 2014	February 11, 2024
At Green Bit, Doflamingo reveals that 19 of the 20 kings who formed the World Government moved to Mariejois, leaving their homelands to elect new rulers. He then tells a defeated Law that the Donquixote Family once ruled Dressrosa before the Riku family. Meanwhile, Zoro and Kin'emon regroup with Sanji outside the Colosseum. After discussing their plan, Sanji gives Kin'emon the map to the toy house and leaves with Violet to rescue their ship. Zoro and Kin'emon search for a way into the Colosseum while avoiding attention, but Bartolomeo spots them and fangirls over Zoro, whom he idolizes as the Straw Hats' first mate. On the Thousand Sunny, now distorted by Giolla's powers, Brook pretends to cooperate with her art antics while secretly plotting. He tricks her into restoring his sword and quickly defeats her. With her now down, her art spell breaks, returning the ship and crew of Nami, Chopper, and Momonosuke back to normal. Giolla makes one last stand by transforming herself into art she calls "Heaven's Door Art", but Nami uses the Gaon Cannon to finish her off, with Momonosuke delivering the final blow to her with a bat.
654	26	"Beautiful Sword! Cavendish of the White Horse!"; Transliteration: "Biken! Hakuba no Kyabendisshu" (Japanese: 美剣！白馬のキャベンディッシュ！)	Yoshihiro Ueda	Jin Tanaka	July 20, 2014	February 18, 2024
In the Corrida Colosseum, Block D is continuing as Cavendish fights against Gardoa and defeats him. Meanwhile, Mummy, Orlumbus, Cavendish, Meadows, Fighting Lion, Damask, Rolling Logan, Acilia, and Suleiman are introduced as they fight while Rebecca is being ganged up by various other fighters. At Green Bit, Doflamingo confirms his status as a former World Noble, having ceased being one a long time ago. Law manages to escape Fujitora's gravity and makes a run for it with Caesar, with a plan of sending him to the Straw Hat Pirates' ship and stalling Doflamingo on the bridge to Dressrosa. Doflamingo, however, sees through his plan and moves to attack the ship, but Sanji intercepts him at the last minute.
655	27	"A Big Clash! Sanji vs. Doflamingo!"; Transliteration: "Dai Gekitotsu! Sanji tai Dofuramingo" (Japanese: 大激突！サンジVS(たい)ドフラミンゴ)	Ayako Hiraike	Yoshiyuki Suga	August 3, 2014	February 25, 2024
Sanji puts up a valiant fight but is ultimately defeated by Doflamingo. Before Doflamingo can finish him off, Sanji is saved by Law who teleports themselves back to the Thousand Sunny. With Caesar back in their control, Law orders the Straw Hats to head to Zou immediately. Though the Straw Hats are reluctant in leaving their remaining friends behind, they are forced to agree when they are assaulted by a flying Marine battleship, courtesy of Fujitora, and another one of Doflamingo's string whips, but not before Sanji questions Law on why he's fixated on Doflamingo when their true objective is defeating Kaido. Law reveals that Doflamingo cannot pursue them in cloudless areas with his String-String Fruit and advises them to find one fast. Once the Straw Hats escape with Caesar and the Navy head back to Dressrosa, the two Warlords have a showdown on the iron bridge. Law told his former leader that he is ending the alliance with the Straw Hats because once they stop the production of SMILE, Kaido will kill Doflamingo. Law also reveals that his goal was to make Doflamingo pay for what he did 13 years ago, even if it cost him his own life.
656	28	"Rebecca's Special Attack! Back-to-the-Water Dance!"; Transliteration: "Rebekka Hissatsu Ken! Haisui no Kenbu" (Japanese: レベッカ必殺剣！背水の剣舞)	Toshinori Fukuzawa	Shōji Yonemura	August 10, 2014	March 3, 2024
Trafalgar Law and Donquixote Doflamingo begin their duel with a bang on the iron bridge while the fleeing Straw Hats are already on their way to Zou. On the ship, Momonosuke talks about how he was traumatized by Doflamingo's cruelty and was afraid of what he might do to Kanjuro. Meanwhile on Dressrosa, Violet is seen heading towards the palace on her toy steed. Zoro and Kin'emon are with Bartolomeo who agrees to find Luffy for them only if Zoro gives him an autograph. At the battle royale, Rebecca is knocking out fighters by tripping them out of the ring without injuring a single one until Rolling Logan confronts her.
657	29	"The Most Violent Fighter! Logan vs. Rebecca!"; Transliteration: "Saikyō no Senshi! Rōgan tai Rebekka" (Japanese: 最凶の戦士！ローガンVS(たい)レベッカ)	Kōhei Kureta	Hirohiko Kamisaka	August 17, 2014	March 10, 2024
Bartolomeo searches for Luffy while he stumbles upon the infirmary with the losers of Block C. Inside the Colosseum, Sai is being treated along with all of the other injured fighters who never knew Sai was secretly dropped into an underground chamber where all the tournament dropouts and "diseased" toys were thrown. Everyone there has no clue what Doflamingo plans on doing with them. In the Corrida Colosseum, the crowd accuses Rebecca of running around and avoiding the fight, while Rolling Logan is chasing her, knocking out other contestants in the process. Rebecca is fighting Rolling Logan while the latter tries to break her bones. He eventually grabs her and starts to squeeze her till Acilia shows up to save her and Rebecca manages to overpower Logan and has him fall out of the ring. Acilia then teams up with Rebecca to ensure her chance to reach the finals. Meanwhile, Luffy tries to get a better view of the screen while discussing the dark nature of Dressrosa with the prisoner-gladiators, when all of a sudden he encounters Bartolomeo.
658	30	"A Big Surprise! A True Identity of the Toy Soldier!"; Transliteration: "Shōgeki! Omocha no Heitai no Shōtai!" (Japanese: 衝撃！おもちゃの兵隊の正体！)	Katsumi Tokoro	Tomohiro Nakayama	August 24, 2014	March 24, 2024
After some conversation, Ricky reveals himself to be Riku Dold III, the former king of Dressrosa and Rebecca's grandfather. Many of the fighters in the holding cell show their respect to the former king, and Doflamingo's role as an agitator and arms dealer in inter-kingdom conflict is discussed. Suddenly, a thread of goo from the ceiling snares Sai and drags him up a tunnel, where Trébol, by unseen means, turns him into a toy and releases him out into the public. In the Flower Fields, Gancho reveals to Usopp, Robin, and Franky the cruelty of the Donquixote Family from 900 years ago, and how the Dwarves were slaved up until the rise of the Riku Family. The dwarfs all agree that Doflamingo's presence is a terrible thing for the country, and that an incident framed King Doldo III as a villain so he is undeservedly hated by Dressrosa today. Finally, the Thunder Soldier reveals that he is Rebecca's father.
659	31	"A Horrible Past! The Secret of Dressrosa!"; Transliteration: "Senritsu no Kako! Doresurōza no Himitsu" (Japanese: 戦慄の過去！ドレスローザの秘密)	Yoshihiro Ueda	Shōji Yonemura	August 31, 2014	March 31, 2024
While the fight for block D continues, Thunder Soldier explains to the Straw Hat Pirates how King Riku lost the throne and respect of Dressrosa. Ten years ago Doflamingo appeared in the king's chambers, asking for a 10 billion Beli ransom, in order to leave the country alone. Riku sent his soldiers to ask of the citizens' money, but while they were willingly trying to help their king, Doflamingo controlled Riku and his soldiers with his ability, and made them attack their own people against their will. In the shadows, Doflamingo and his crew are waiting for the right moment to interfere and act as a saving hero in the eyes of Dressrosa's confused citizens.
660	32	"A Nightmare! The Tragic Night of Dressrosa!"; Transliteration: "Akumu! Doresurōza Higeki no Ichiya" (Japanese: 悪夢！ドレスローザ悲劇の一夜)	Tetsuya Endō	Yoshiyuki Suga	September 7, 2014	April 7, 2024
While Doflamingo continues to control Riku Dold III, his subordinates manage to take control of the castle with the help of Monet, who was at the time undercover as a servant and also took princess Viola hostage. With the people's trust in him in tatters, and his spirit broken, King Riku begs for death. Then, Doflamingo appears with his strongest subordinates and defeats the king and his army, setting the grounds for his takeover of the island. After telling the Straw Hat Pirates of the tragedies of the past, Thunder Soldier explains that the king is still alive since Viola pledged her service to Doflamingo in exchange for the King's life. He, also, explained that although the toys of Dressrosa were once people who despised Doflamingo, they still remember who they were, but not each other and that the drive for revolution is still in them. Thunder Soldier also explains that the reason for their rebellion was the news of Doflamingo's resignation was false, shocking Usopp, Robin and Franky, who realize they unintentionally caused the rebellion. In the underground chamber, almost all of the fighters were transformed except for Riku and Chinjao, with the latter having mysteriously forgotten that he had grandchildren. In the colosseum, Luffy meets up with Zoro and Kin'emon with the help of Bartolomeo, although he was nowhere to be seen.
661	33	"A Showdown Between the Warlords! Law vs. Doflamingo!"; Transliteration: "Shichibukai Taiketsu - Rō tai Dofuramingo" (Japanese: 七武海対決 ローVS(たい)ドフラミンゴ)	Directed by : Satoshi Itō; Storyboarded by : Takashi Ōtsuka	Jin Tanaka	September 14, 2014	April 14, 2024
As Luffy talks with Zoro and Kinemon, Bellamy begins approaching Luffy, saying he finally found him. Bellamy is about to attack Luffy but begins having second thoughts. Just then, Dellinger interrupts him, claiming he has orders from Doflamingo to dispose of him, since Bellamy is considered a nuisance. At the iron bridge, Law and Doflamingo continue their fight, with the latter having the upper hand. Diamante calls to inform his captain about Violet's betrayal, which Doflamingo had already figured out. He orders Diamante to send Lao G at the entrance of the factory to prevent the Straw Hat Pirates from destroying it, and handle the crowd's entertainment by himself. The navy sees through Zoro's disguise and suspect that Lucy is in fact Straw-Hat Luffy. However, they seem to have no memory of the fighters that have been turned into toys. The Straw Hat Pirates have a meeting via the Transponder Snail and share their knowledge so far. Sanji and his team decide to head back to Dressrosa and Franky asks permission to assist the Riku army's revolution, to which Luffy urges him to go all out. While Admiral Fujitora arrives at the shores of Dressrosa, there is a big ruckus in the city, with explosions and buildings being cut in half. Doflamingo has Law beaten on the ground in front of the Colosseum. He then takes out a pistol and shoots Law three times.
662	34	"Two Great Rivals Meet Each Other! Straw Hat and Heavenly Demon!"; Transliteration: "Ryōyū Aimamieru! Mugiwara to Ten Yasha" (Japanese: 両雄相まみえる！麦わらと天夜叉)	Masahiro Hosoda	Hirohiko Kamisaka	September 21, 2014	April 21, 2024
After shooting Law, Doflamingo lies to shocked citizens, claiming Law faked the news about Doflamingo stepping down. When Luffy questions him, Doflamingo reveals Law was once his subordinate and say that it's his responsibility to "educate" him. Zoro and Kin'emon try to rescue Law, but Admiral Fujitora intervenes, using his gravity powers to trap Zoro underground. Luffy, unable to help due to Sea Prism Stone bars, watches helplessly. The crew is stunned to learn Doflamingo has an admiral on his side. Fujitora and Doflamingo take Law to the palace to continue with their discussion. Zoro urges Luffy to find a way out as marines close in. Meanwhile, Sanji's group is ambushed by Big Mom's ship, carrying Tamago and Pekoms, who are after Caesar who panics, believing that they want to kill him for stealing research funds. Realizing they must keep Big Mom's crew away from Dressrosa, Luffy orders the Sunny crew to head to Zou. Sanji asks to return fire, and Luffy agrees, having already picked a fight with Big Mom. Franky leads the factory destruction team, while Luffy declares they'll storm the palace to save Law and defeat Doflamingo. Meanwhile, a mysterious figure enters the Colosseum.
663	35	"Luffy Astonished! The Man Who Inherits Ace's Will!"; Transliteration: "Rufi Kyōgaku - Ēsu no Ishi o Tsugu Otoko" (Japanese: ルフィ驚愕 エースの意志を継ぐ男)	Directed by : Tetsuya Endō; Storyboarded by : Kenji Yokoyama	Tomohiro Nakayama	September 28, 2014	April 21, 2024
Dellinger continues attacking Bellamy until Bartolomeo saves him, before Dellinger is called by Diamante to guard the Toy House. Thunder Soldier explains "Operation: SOP", and how there's an underground trading port where Sugar (the one who makes people into toys with her Hobby-Hobby Fruit powers) is hiding. As Luffy is looking for the colosseum's exit, he runs into Bartolomeo and Bellamy, and are shortly approached by a mysterious figure. The figure claims he will be the one to eat the Flame-Flame Fruit. Luffy is then seen shock and then tearfully hugs the figure and agrees to let him have Ace's fruit. The figure dons Luffys disguise so the latter may fight in the colosseum. Bellamy leads Luffy to an exit as Luffy, Kin'emon, and Zoro head to the Flower Field in disguises.
664	36	"Operation SOP Starts! Usoland Charges Forth!"; Transliteration: "Esu-Ō-Pī Sakusen Kaishi - Usorando Totsugeki" (Japanese: SOP(エス・オー・ピー)作戦開始 ウソランド突撃)	Yoshihiro Ueda	Shōji Yonemura	October 5, 2014	April 28, 2024
At the Flower Field, the dwarf army and the Straw Hats begin to move out, with Franky taking the front entrance via the toy house while the rest of the army take the secret tunnel that leads to the harbor. Franky, remembering Luffy's orders to go all out went and created a huge ruckus in front of the toy house grabbing the attention of every officer in the Donquixote Pirates. In the ensuing chaos, Senor Pink who was guarding the entrance prepares to face Franky. In the tunnel, the dwarves explain to Usopp the size of the Donquixote Family and the identities and strengths of the officers who are running the operations. As they reach the end of the tunnel, the army find themselves directly underneath the palace plateau where the huge harbor is located. Unnoticed by anyone, the army prepares to find their target, Sugar who is guarded by Trébol himself.
665	37	"A Burning Passion! Rebecca vs. Suleiman!"; Transliteration: "Atsuki Omoi - Rebekka tai Sureiman" (Japanese: 熱き思い レベッカVS(たい)スレイマン)	Katsumi Tokoro	Yoshiyuki Suga	October 12, 2014	April 28, 2024
The colosseum's D block battle is almost over with nearly 30 fighters remaining with Rebecca among them. At the Hidden Harbor, Usopp learned from the dwarves that Thunder Soldier left the group in order to assassinate Doflamingo at his palace, leaving Usopp in command of the army much to his disbelief. Though they were nearly caught by some soldiers the dwarves easily subdued them and their clothes were given to Usopp and Robin for disguise. Near the Harbor elevator, many soldiers were rushing towards the elevator to see the battle between Franky and Senor Pink, unaware that Thunder Soldier and a few dwarves were hiding inside a crate in the lift. Seeing no other way, Thunder Soldier assaults the soldiers in order to hijack the lift. During battle, he recalls his training of Rebecca to teach her battle instinct. He then declares his goal to restore Dressrosa to King Riku's rule. At the colosseum, an unexplained event caused every fighter in the arena to fall unconscious one after another. Before anyone could speculate what happened, an unidentified fighter is seen getting up in the arena.
666	38	"The End of the Match?! A Surprising Result of Block D!"; Transliteration: "Shōsha Kettei!? Dī-Burokku Shōgeki no Ketsumatsu" (Japanese: 勝者決定!? D(ディー)ブロック衝撃の結末)	Directed by : Toshinori Fukuzawa; Storyboarded by : Tetsuaki Matsuda	Jin Tanaka	October 19, 2014	May 5, 2024
As the dust clears, the last fighter standing turns out to be Rebecca making her the winner much to the dissatisfaction of the announcer and the crowd. Speculations of Rebecca cheating were thrown throughout the crowd, but Rebecca was the only one who saw what really happened. During the fight, Rebecca saw Cavendish fall asleep in the middle of the battle. Before the other fighters would capitalize on their sleeping target, Cavendish promptly woke up with a sinister face that promised torment for his enemies. In that instant, Cavendish moved like the wind, cutting down every fighter in his way. Rebecca however saw this and barely manages to avoid a fatal strike from Cavendish, who then fell asleep again. Outside, Vice Admiral Bastille finished explaining to an officer about what happened in the colosseum as this was the work of not Cavendish, but his alter ego Hakuba, a dangerous man who eluded the Navy years ago for his dangerous technique. At the Palace, Doflamingo is standing before King Riku who is chained up. Doflamingo gloated that Viola's hope of the Straw Hats defeating him and freeing Law is worthless, as he had full confidence that his men will prevent them from breaching his operations and believes that Luffy is still trapped in the colosseum. At that moment, Robin and Usopp have successfully infiltrated the basement harbor, and Luffy's group ran into Viola who wants to help them in entering the palace.
667	39	"The Admiral's Decision! Fujitora vs. Doflamingo!"; Transliteration: "Taishō no Ketsudan - Fujitora tai Dofuramingo" (Japanese: 大将の決断 藤虎VS(たい)ドフラミンゴ)	Nobuharu Kamanaka	Shōji Yonemura	October 26, 2014	May 5, 2024
In the Colosseum, Rebecca finds Lucy to tell him she is in the finals too, but notices that Lucy is different than she remembers. Diamante is also announced to be fighting in the next match. Meanwhile, at the palace, Viola shows Luffy's group a secret emergency lift that was kept hidden even from Doflamingo. Though stairs were also available, the group prefer to take the lift up with Luffy acting as counterweight. The battle at the Toy House rages on as Franky launches rockets at Senor Pink who, instead of using his Swim-Swim Fruit power which allows him to swim through the floor and walls, he takes a missile on the face to protect an immobilized Machvise. He then gets up and tries to flatten Franky with a body slam but misses. Before the fight could continue, the Navy shows up surrounding the Toy House with the intent to arrest Franky. In the Palace, Fujitora reveals that his intention is to abolish the Warlord system. Doflamingo takes this as a threat and attacks him, but Fujitora says that his orders in defending the country from the Straw Hats still stand and once he deals with them, he will turn his attention towards Doflamingo. Back to the Colosseum, the final battle for the Flame-Flame Fruit is about to begin with a new battle platform and the first to step out is Lucy.
668	40	"The Final Round Starts! Diamante the Hero Shows Up!"; Transliteration: "Kesshō Kaishi - Eiyū Diamante Tōjō" (Japanese: 決勝開始 英雄ディアマンテ登場)	Tetsuya Endō	Tomohiro Nakayama	November 2, 2014	May 26, 2024
The contenders of the final round, Burgess, Bartolomeo, Lucy, Rebecca, and Diamante make their way in the colosseum. When some of the losers from Block D attempts to attack Rebecca, Diamante stops them while demonstrating his Ripple-Ripple Fruit powers, which allows him to make his body and objects flutter like a flag, allowing him to reshape them. The final round begins as Lucy tries to find the Fighting Fish with the Flame-Flame Fruit. Meanwhile, Luffy, Zoro, Kin'emon, and Viola try to sneak into the Rampart Tower, in which Luffy merely breaks the front gates open and charges through many guards. After hearing the report that Straw Hat and his allies were in the tower, Doflamingo questions why Luffy is there when he should be in the colosseum.
669	41	"A Moving Castle! The Top Executive Pica Rises Up!"; Transliteration: "Ugoku Shiro! Saikō Kanbu Pīka Shutsugen!" (Japanese: 動く城！最高幹部ピーカ出現！)	Yoshihiro Ueda	Yoshiyuki Suga	November 9, 2014	June 2, 2024
Luffy, Zoro, and Viola make their way up the castle, while Kin'emon and Wicca go down to the Toy House. The three encounter Pica, who fights them using his Stone-Stone powers to assimilate into the palace. At the Toy House, the Navy keeps trying to attack Franky, who still prevails in the fight. Cavendish is dropped into the trading port where he's immobilized by slime made Trebol's Sticky-Sticky Fruit power and changed into a toy by Sugar. Usopp, Robin, and the dwarves make it to Sugar's chamber as Leo reveals his Tatababasco fruit, which they'll use to poison and knock out Sugar. Leo makes his speech about how all the toys will turn back to normal after she's defeated, the dwarves cheering in excitement as Usopp tries to silence them.
670	42	"Dragon Claw Strikes! Lucy's Intimidating Attack!"; Transliteration: "Ryū no Tsume Sakuretsu! Rūshī Kyōi no Ichigeki!" (Japanese: 竜の爪炸裂！ルーシー脅威の一撃！)	Directed by : Aya Komaki; Storyboarded by : Kōhei Hatano & Kenji Yokoyama	Hirohiko Kamisaka	November 16, 2014	June 9, 2024
Leo prepares to plant the Tatababasco grape in Sugar's bowl but is stopped by Robin after she sees how dangerous Trébol is. In the Colosseum, Jesus Burgess earned the ire of the audience when he indiscriminately attacked the crowd while fighting the boss fighting fish. The fighting fish with the prize tried to attack Rebecca but missed and Lucy managed to get on top of the beast. Diamante moved to attack Lucy but broke his sword against the latter's pipe in the process. Jesus tried his turn to attack but Lucy intercepted and destroyed his elbow guard, with Diamante noticing the change in Lucy's fighting style. Inside the harbor lift, Lao G has stumbled upon Thunder Soldier's squad and proceeds to prevent them from reaching Doflamingo. Inside the palace Kin'emon decides to disguise himself to elude the Donquixote Family members while Zoro has Luffy and Viola move on while he fights Pica.
671	43	"Defeat Sugar! The Army of the Little People Charges!"; Transliteration: "Datō Shugā - Kobito no Heitai Totsugeki!" (Japanese: 打倒シュガー 小人の兵隊突撃！)	Masahiro Hosoda	Shōji Yonemura	November 23, 2014	June 16, 2024
Zoro's battle with Pica continues as Luffy and Viola move forward. Meanwhile, the tower elevator makes it to the palace first floor as Lao G continues to attack Thunder Soldier. After Robin lures Trebol out of the Officer Tower, Leo runs in and throws the Tatababasco in Sugar's bowl, only for her to see through its trick and toss it away. The dwarves charge in attempt to attack her, but she transforms them into toys. Sugar then calls Trebol and warns him of the attack, so Trebol catches a ship with his powers and tosses it to break open the tower.
672	44	"The Last Light of Hope! The Secret of Our Commander!"; Transliteration: "Saigo no Hikari - Warera ga Taichō no Himitsu!" (Japanese: 最後の光 我らが隊長の秘密！)	Katsumi Tokoro	Tomohiro Nakayama	November 30, 2014	June 23, 2024
The destruction caused by Trébol is enough to bring the attempted assault on Sugar to an end as the dwarves are rounded up and interrogated. The dwarves are betrayed by their own naivety and accidentally reveal Usoland to them, and in turn Trébol ignites the slime they're caught in. Leo survives and lands near Usopp and Robin who evaded capture. Leo tells Usopp that their plan must succeed for the sake of their commander. At the Palace, Thunder Soldier is kicked out of the lift by Lao G and has a flashback of his fight with Rebecca over the false news of Doflamingo's resignation. At the Colosseum, Rebecca lies beaten by Diamante who taunts her over the death of her mother. Seeing this, Lucy tells Bartolomeo to protect Rebecca. Thunder Soldier is saved by his dwarf squad from Lao G, and the survivors tell him that he must press on. Usopp is skeptical on why they would put their faith in a toy soldier, but Leo reveals that Thunder Soldier was the first to be turned into a toy and not given a contract, which why he leads the resistance, and that his human identity is the legendary gladiator, Kyros.
673	45	"The Rupture Man! Gladius Blows Up Big Time!"; Transliteration: "Panku Ningen - Guradiusu Dai Bakuhatsu!" (Japanese: 破裂(パンク)人間 グラディウス大爆発！)	Directed by : Tetsuya Endō; Storyboarded by : Tetsuaki Matsuda	Jin Tanaka	December 7, 2014	June 30, 2024
While Thunder Soldier, Cub, and Rampo progress through the castle, they encounter and battle Gladius. When Soldier attempts to get away, Gladius catches and prepares to blow him up with his Pop-Pop fruit powers, but Soldier is rescued by Luffy. Luffy, Viola, and Soldier run away and make it to the Suit Chamber, watching Doflamingo demand information from Law. In the trading port, Leo and his dwarves try once again to poison Sugar, but Trebol stops them, and Sugar has her toys attack them further. Robin subdues the two so Leo can poison Sugar, but Sugar turns Robin into a toy by touching the latter's arm.
674	46	"A Liar! Usoland on the Run!"; Transliteration: "Usotsuki - Usorando Tōsō-chū!" (Japanese: ウソつき ウソランド逃走中！)	Directed by : Satoshi Itō; Storyboarded by : Toshinori Fukuzawa	Hirohiko Kamisaka	December 14, 2014	July 7, 2024
Usopp attempts to escape from the trading port after the dwarves' defeat. Leo and his comrades keep trying to tell Trebol that Usoland will save them, their speech transmitted across the port via Transponder Snail. Trebol merely mocks the dwarves and begins stomping them, but eventually, Usopp returns and yells at the dwarves. He tells them he's no hero and he really was lying, for he's the sniper of the Straw Hats, Usopp. He finally decides to fight for them as he launches a Shuriken Star that cuts Trebol to pieces.
675	47	"A Fateful Encounter! Kyros and King Riku!"; Transliteration: "Unmei no Deai - Kyurosu to Riku Ō" (Japanese: 運命の出会い キュロスとリク王)	Yoshihiro Ueda	Yoshiyuki Suga	December 21, 2014	July 14, 2024
While Usopp faces Trebol, the Thunder Soldier recalls his time as Kyros. He was arrested after killing some thugs who murdered his best friend. After much time as a gladiator, Kyros chooses to stay even after winning his freedom, due to the citizens' hatred of him and the traumatic guilt of his act of murder, until his 3000th fight against a disguised King Riku who convinces him to be free. Kyros manages to become King Riku's captain of his guard despite objections from the latter eldest daughter Scarlett, who at first is not fond of Kryos but falls in love with him after he saves her from pirates. Kyros and Scarlett later marry after her family helps her fake her death (as to avoid a scandal of a princess marrying a former criminal) and together conceive Rebecca. As they have a happy life together as a family, Doflamingo ruins it as he attempts to take over Dressrosa that night 10 years ago.
676	48	"The Operation Failed! Usoland the Hero Dies?!"; Transliteration: "Sakusen Shippai! Eiyū Usorando Shisu!?" (Japanese: 作戦失敗！英雄ウソランド死す!?)	Tetsuya Endō	Yoshiyuki Suga	December 28, 2014	July 14, 2024
Ten years ago, when Dressrosa is attacked by the Donquixote Pirates, Kyros rushes to the palace to see what's happening. He is ambushed by the pirates and chained to the ground by his left leg as Doflamingo presents himself, showing King Riku's beaten body. Furious, Kyros cuts his own leg off to attack Doflamingo, until Sugar transforms him to a toy. Kyros escapes, rescuing Riku in the process, but the king does not remember him. Days later, Kyros witnesses Diamante murdering his wife, Scarlett, leaving him to bring the food to and care for his daughter, Rebecca. In the underground trade port, Usopp attempts to fight Trebol, but is easily defeated and glued to the ground. Sugar proceeds to feed him the Tatababasco berry, but Usopp unleashes a great flame as his eyes pop out, scaring Sugar unconscious.
677	49	"The Legend Is Back! Kyros' All-Out Blow!"; Transliteration: "Densetsu Fukkatsu! Kyurosu Konshin no Ichigeki" (Japanese: 伝説復活！キュロス渾身の一撃)	Aya Komaki	Shōji Yonemura	January 11, 2015	July 21, 2024
As an unconscious Sugar falls to the ground, the toys in Dressrosa begin reverting to their human forms, to the shock of the humans around them. The Tontatta proclaimed Operation SOP was a success as the freed men and women, enraged at Doflamingo for turning them into toys, begin attacking his soldiers and burning down his flags around Dressrosa. Meanwhile, Kyros, now remembered by his friends and family, finishes what he started 10 years ago by decapitating Doflamingo.
678	50	"The Fire Fist Strikes! The Flame-Flame Fruit Power Returns!"; Transliteration: "Hiken Sakuretsu! Fukkatsu Mera-Mera no Mi no Chikara" (Japanese: 火拳炸裂！復活メラメラの実の力)	Directed by : Yoshihiro Ueda; Storyboarded by : Kōhei Kureta	Jin Tanaka	January 18, 2015	July 21, 2024
The final Colosseum round continues as Rebecca finally remembers her father. Lucy destroys the Colosseum with his Dragon Claw Fists: Dragon's Breath before leaping at the Fighting Fish baring the Flame-Flame Fruit and claims it. Gaining Ace's former powers, he takes off his disguise and Diamante recognizes him as a revolutionary, who then uses Ace's Fire Fist technique to burn a hole directly through the bottom of the Colosseum. Down in the trade port, Hajrudin picks up the barely conscious Usopp and presents him to all the former toys, proclaiming he is their savior. The hole created by Lucy is seen breaking on the port's ceiling as the remaining fighters fall in. As the light shines upon Usopp, the warriors believe he is a god. Asking what to do next, Usopp tells them to destroy the factory behind him.
679	51	"Dashing onto the Scene! The Chief of Staff of the Revolutionary Army, Sabo!"; Transliteration: "Sassō Tōjō - Kakumei-gun Sanbō Sōchō Sabo!" (Japanese: 颯爽登場 革命軍参謀総長サボ！)	Masahiro Hosoda	Hirohiko Kamisaka	January 25, 2015	August 11, 2024
Koala, Lucy, Rebecca, and Bartolomeo go down to the trade port, where Lucy finally reveals himself to be Luffy's and Ace's long thought dead brother, Sabo, who is now the Chief of Staff of the Revolutionary Army, and is working alongside both Hack and Koala, now an assistant Fish-Man Karate Instructor for the revolutionaries. They explain that the Revolutionary Army is there to stop the distributing of weapons to warring countries, but the many Revolutionaries who were sent to Dresrosa were turned into toys. In the royal palace, Kyros takes down Buffalo and Baby 5, and when Luffy is about to unlock Law's Sea Prism Cuffs, Doflamingo reveals to be alive. With no other option, he is going to use the Birdcage, much to Law's horror.
680	52	"The Devil's Trap! A Dressrosa Extermination Plan!"; Transliteration: "Akuma no Wana - Doresurōza Senmetsu Sakusen" (Japanese: 悪魔の罠 ドレスローザ殲滅作戦)	Directed by : Satoshi Itō; Storyboarded by : Masayoshi Nishida	Tomohiro Nakayama	February 1, 2015	August 18, 2024
Doflamingo reveals that what Kyros decapitated was only a clone made of string and orders Pica to push Luffy and the others off of the palace. Doflamingo then unleashes his Birdcage, sealing the entire island in strings. The strings then latch onto people and take control of them, forcing them to attack each other. Pica then rearranges the whole island, levitating areas such as the palace and the Flower Field. Doflamingo announces a game to kill him to break the cage, unless they kill all of the people he is about to name.
681	53	"The 500 Million Berry Man! Target: Usoland!"; Transliteration: "Go Oku no Otoko - Nerawareta Usorando!" (Japanese: 五億の男 狙われたウソランド！)	Katsumi Tokoro	Yoshiyuki Suga	February 8, 2015	August 25, 2024
As citizens and marines are forced to attack each other in the streets of Dressrosa, leading the citizens to understand that King Riku's rampage ten years ago was due to Doflamingo's manipulation, Doflamingo reveals to the island a hit list, which includes the Straw Hat Pirates and King Riku's Family, with Usopp having the highest reward. Robin, Usopp, Sabo, Koala, and Hack head for the SMILE Factory while Bartolomeo holds off the freed toys, and Kin'emon leaves to look for Kanjuro. Franky leaves the Toy House and goes to destroy the factory while Trebol and Diamante regroup at the palace. At the palace plateau, Kyros abandons the group to go after Doflamingo. Rebecca contacts Luffy, asking about her father, and Luffy states that he promised to end this game and beat up Doflamingo.
682	54	"Breaking Through Enemy Lines! Luffy and Zoro Launch the Counter-Attack!"; Transliteration: "Tekijin Toppa - Rufi to Zoro Hangeki Kaishi" (Japanese: 敵陣突破 ルフィ・(と)ゾロ反撃開始)	Yoshihiro Ueda	Hirohiko Kamisaka	February 15, 2015	September 1, 2024
Sabo and Koala separate from Robin's group and head in separate directions as Robin decides to move toward the palace plateau. As Law and Luffy argue over what to do next, Koala investigates the underground trading port, and the navy attempts to restrain the people being controlled by Parasite. Doflamingo meets with his top executives, where he reveals that the navy will not hinder them in their activities for now. Luffy, Zoro, and Law land near several marines and Donquixote underlings and are confronted by Fujitora.
683	55	"With a Rumbling of the Ground! The God of Destruction - Giant Pica Descends!"; Transliteration: "Daichi Meidō - Hakai-shin Kyodai Pīka Kōrin" (Japanese: 大地鳴動 破壊神巨大ピーカ降臨)	Toshinori Fukuzawa	Shōji Yonemura	March 1, 2015	September 8, 2024
Luffy and Zoro face off against Fujitora to get to Doflamingo. At the palace, Pica expresses his desire to take the Donquixote enemies out alone, and it is revealed that he is easily offended by reaction to his high-pitched voice. Robin's group continues to run away from the former toy slaves and try to make their way to the royal plateau. The fight with Fujitora ends as Pica emerges from the ground as a huge golem. When Pica speaks, Luffy bursts into hysterical laughter which offends Pica who throws a punch at Luffy. The punch causes a large shockwave, sending Zoro flying and leaving Luffy's fate unknown.
684	56	"Gathering into a Powerful Front! Luffy and a Group of Brutal Warriors!"; Transliteration: "Dai Shūketsu! Rufi to Kyōaku Senshi Gundan" (Japanese: 大集結！ルフィと凶悪戦士軍団)	Ayako Hiraike	Jin Tanaka	March 15, 2015	September 8, 2024
Zoro emerges from the rubble, finding Luffy and Law unharmed by the punch. Cavendish comes in and shows gratitude to the Straw Hats for saving him but talks about how he will kill Doflamingo. Luffy's group walks away and gets chased by the bounty hunters, and Chinjao catches up to Luffy to thank him. Most of the other strong Colosseum competitors find Luffy's group and argue over who will kill Doflamingo. Their fight against Pica begins as Luffy tries to run away from the rest of the Colosseum competitors. Pica sees Luffy and throws a punch with his huge stone arm, but Chinjao and Elizabello II respond by using "Drill Dragon Nail" and "King Punch" respectively to destroy Pica's arm.
685	57	"Steady Progress! Luffy's Army vs. Pica!"; Transliteration: "Kai Shingeki! Rufi Gundan tai Pīka!" (Japanese: 快進撃！ルフィ軍団VS(たい)ピーカ！)	Aya Komaki	Tomohiro Nakayama	March 22, 2015	September 15, 2024
After Pica's arm was destroyed by Chinjao and Elizabello II, the Colosseum fighters proceed to decimate the Doflamingo soldiers. However, Pica attacked again with his remaining arm, throwing the fighters in disarray. The Colosseum fighters then noticed that Luffy is missing and one of them sees Luffy riding Ucy the Bull while climbing the colossal arm toward the giant's head. Pica noticed this and grew his arm back, before going to strike his attacker, but Luffy was ready and breaks the giant's head off with a Grizzly Magnum. Meanwhile, Robin's group reaches the top of the plaza and manages to elude their pursuers. Pica is then revealed to be controlling the colossus from within. He prepares to cut Luffy down with a huge sword, but Zoro intercepts it and stays behind to duel Pica while Luffy races toward Doflamingo's palace.
686	58	"A Shocking Confession! Law's Soulful Vow!"; Transliteration: "Shōgeki Kokuhaku! Rō Atsuki Tamashī no Chikai!" (Japanese: 衝撃告白！ロー熱き魂の誓い！)	Tetsuya Endō	Jin Tanaka	March 29, 2015	September 15, 2024
While the fighters march forward after climbing over Pica's body, Law, who was still with Luffy, makes a decision to fight Doflamingo directly, revealing that thirteen years ago, Corazon, Law's benefactor, a top executive of the Donquixote Family as well as Doflamingo's biological brother, was killed by Doflamingo. Robin's group reaches Viola and Dold's location and plan to follow Luffy's group to hand over the key to Law's handcuffs. Rebecca and Bartolomeo offer to give Law's handcuffs key to Luffy, but Doldo is still hesitant to trust the pirates. However, with Viola's and Leo's confidence that the Straw Hat pirates can save them, as opposed the Government's indifference and indulgence to Doflamingo, Doldo realizes that the people have unintentionally looked to the Straw Hats for hope. Meanwhile, as Franky tries to destroy the factory, he is interrupted by Señor Pink and they engage in another battle.
687	59	"A Big Collision! Chief of Staff - Sabo vs. Admiral Fujitora!"; Transliteration: "Dai Gekitotsu! Sanbō Sōchō Sabo tai Taishō Fujitora" (Japanese: 大激突！参謀総長サボVS(たい)大将藤虎)	Masahiro Hosoda	Tomohiro Nakayama	April 5, 2015	September 22, 2024
Luffy's group reaches the first level of the castle while the navy and Fujitora are held off by Sabo. Bastille warns his men to back off as he faces Sabo, whose superior fighting skills defeat the navy and the Vice-Admiral quickly. Issho forgets about the birdcage and calls down a meteorite, resulting in damage that was wider than expected. Sabo remains unharmed and walks out of the fire, having defeated Bastille. As Sabo and Fujitora prepare to fight, Sabo reveals to the navy that he, Ace, and Luffy are sworn brothers, and that no matter where he is in the world, Sabo will be there if ever Luffy calls for his help.
688	60	"A Desperate Situation! Luffy Gets Caught in a Trap!"; Transliteration: "Zettai Zetsumei - Wana ni Kakatta Rufi!" (Japanese: 絶体絶命 罠にかかったルフィ！)	Yoshihiro Ueda	Atsuhiro Tomioka	April 12, 2015	September 22, 2024
At the palace hills, Luffy is still riding Ucy towards the palace but was dejected to see that the rest of the colosseum fighters are ahead of him in the race to fight Doflamingo. After a little help from the Funk brothers pointing out a short cut, Luffy and Ucy enter a tunnel. While inside, Law warns Luffy that facing Doflamingo while he is still handcuffed will be suicide. A call from Robin solves that issue as she is sending Leo, Rebecca and Bartolomeo to deliver the cuff keys to them. At the plateau, Bartolomeo, Robin and Rebecca are taking an unorthodox method of traveling to the palace hills flower field by "jumping" through the use of the beetles provided by Leo. Back in the tunnel, the two captains find themselves in a dead end and are surprised to see Doflamingo waiting for them there.
689	61	"A Great Escape! Luffy's Tide-Turning Elephant Gun!"; Transliteration: "Dai Dasshutsu! Rufi Kishikaisei no Zōjū" (Japanese: 大脱出！ルフィ起死回生の象銃)	Directed by : Satoshi Itō; Storyboarded by : Hiroaki Miyamoto	Hirohiko Kamisaka	April 19, 2015	September 29, 2024
Doflamingo's ambush for Luffy and Law is cut short when he is skewered by Abdullah and Jeet only to be exposed as another string clone. The two captains then learn how Kelly Funk betrayed them only to be betrayed by Doflamingo in return. Luffy then decides to make his own shortcut by punching a hole in the roof and carrying Law while leaving Ucy with the two bounty hunters. At the SMILE Factory, the dwarves can help Franky in opening the doors but first he has to deal with Senor Pink. Sabo is locked in a struggle with Issho. Bellamy, who's in the Flower Field, heads towards the palace. Doflamingo, still at the top of the palace, talks with Diamante and Trebol reminiscing when they first met Law when he was a child, who wanted to join his crew to destroy everything in sight because he does not have much time to live.
690	62	"A United Front! Luffy's Breakthrough to the Victory!"; Transliteration: "Kyōdō Sensen - Rufi Shōri e no Toppakō" (Japanese: 共同戦線 ルフィ勝利への突破口)	Directed by : Aya Komaki; Storyboarded by : Masatoshi Chioka	Shōji Yonemura	April 26, 2015	October 6, 2024
While Bellamy confronts Doflamingo regarding the assassination attempt, in the palace's plateau, the Donquixote Pirates' officers have now joined the fight against the colosseum fighters, who struggle against the officer's might, with Suleiman being defeated by Dellinger. A group citizens discover Usopp's and King Riku's location and head out to apprehend them hopping to end Doflamingo's game. In the meantime, the Pink Bee Squad informs the dwarves slaves in the SMILE Factory that they have been tricked, and the enslaved dwarves are now fighting against their overseers. Meanwhile, the colosseum fighters are struggling against the officers while Cavendish offers Luffy and Law a ride to the palace. Kyros joins Luffy's party, and they arrive at the battle taking place in the palace's plateau. Realizing they have no chance against Doflamingo themselves if they cannot even easily beat the officers, they put aside their pride and allow Luffy and co. to move forward, while improving their progress in the fight by working together.
691	63	"The Second Samurai! Evening Shower Kanjuro Appears!"; Transliteration: "Futarime no Samurai - Yūdachi Kanjūrō Tōjō" (Japanese: 二人目の侍 夕立ちカン十郎登場)	Directed by : Makoto Sonoda; Storyboarded by : Katsumi Tokoro	Tomohiro Nakayama	May 3, 2015	October 13, 2024
At the new palace tower, the colosseum fighters are still clashing with the Donquixote Pirates allowing Luffy, Law, Kyros and Cavendish to escape towards the third level in order to reach level four, though Dagama is beaten by Dellinger. Kin'emon has finally found Kanjuro who was hiding in the walls of the scrap heap. After a brief reunion, Kanjuro uses his ability to create a poorly drawn sparrow to fly them out to the surface, but the trapped Dressrosa citizens and soldiers begged to be taken along as well to which Kanjuro makes rather crude ladders for them to climb out. Back at the palace tower Blue Gilly and Boo are defeated by Dellinger and Machvise respectively. Once Luffy and co reached the third level, the group ran into several giant puppet soldiers blocking their path to the fourth level.
692	64	"A Hard-Fought Battle Against Pica! Zoro's Deadly Attack!"; Transliteration: "Gekitō Pīka Sen - Zoro Hissatsu no Ichigeki!" (Japanese: 激闘ピーカ戦 ゾロ必殺の一撃！)	Directed by : Ayako Hiraike; Storyboarded by : Ayako Hiraike & Yoshihiro Ueda	Jin Tanaka	May 10, 2015	November 3, 2024
On the Pica statue, the duel between Pica and Zoro was interrupted by the arrival of Robin's group who asked him to defeat Pica so that they can meet Luffy at the fourth level. Pica then disappears only to reappear at the neck of the statue and controlling the arm into smashing Robin, Rebecca, Bartolomeo and Leo, but Zoro quickly sends a powerful attack at Pica, wounding him, also declaring that he will become the greatest swordsman in the world. At the SMILE factory, the dwarves continue their revolt and are trying to unlock the door before the factory manager Kyuin stops them. But Franky manages to open the door after lying to Senor Pink of an old lady in distress, distracting him.
693	65	"The Little People's Princess! Captive Mansherry!"; Transliteration: "Kobito no Hime - Toraware no Mansherī" (Japanese: 小人の姫 囚われのマンシェリー)	Aya Komaki	Atsuhiro Tomioka	May 17, 2015	November 10, 2024
Franky manages to open the door after lying to Senor Pink of an old lady in distress, distracting him. Franky then grabs Kyuin and uses her to headbutt Senor Pink, stunning him. Angry at being used like a hammer, Kyuin rants about torturing Franky, who walks up to her and kisses her, shocking the dwarves and herself. Senor Pink recovers and tells Kyuin to shut up as her rants are interrupting their man's fight, which promptly resumes. Zoro is still fighting Pica after helping Robin's group move past them. Leo, who is with Rebecca, gets a call from Maujii, the dwarf princess' aide who informs Leo that princess Mansherry is not in the factory and could be in the palace. Leo then relays the info to Viola and Usopp who was getting agitated at the citizens coming after them, but Viola tells him that the citizens will not harm them. While Viola is looking for the princess' whereabouts, Kin'emon and Kanjuro arrive at the plateau, though Usopp is shocked and enraged when he learns Kanjuro (not knowing the situation they're in) made a net for the citizens to reach the plateau. King Riku then comments that Doflamingo will not kill Mansherry since he needs her ability just as much as they do. At the Royal Palace, a guard is seen feeding food to Mansherry who is kept in a room crying her eyes out for Leo to save her.
694	66	"Invincible! A Gruesome Army of Headcracker Dolls!"; Transliteration: "Fujimi! Kyōfu no Atamawari Ningyō Gundan" (Japanese: 不死身！恐怖の頭割り人形軍団)	Yoshihiro Ueda	Shōji Yonemura	May 24, 2015	November 17, 2024
Viola discovered Mansherry's cell and sends the info to Leo, who remembers that room from when Scarlett was alive. Meanwhile, Luffy's group is now fighting against the giant nutcrackers as Faurl is injured in the process as they cannot defeat the nutcrackers. Usopp then hears from Viola that Sugar has revived and his friends are in trouble. Sugar, who is now scared of anyone long nosed, swears revenge against Usopp and his friends. Usopp was horrified by the fact that he forgot about Robin when she was turned into a toy and asks for Viola and Kanjuro's help in sniping at her. Once reaching the third level, Robin's group is attacked by Gladius. He causes Robin and Bartolomeo to plummet downward while Rebecca presses forward. She lands at Luffy's groups location. Law wants the key to his handcuffs so he can join the fight, but Robin says it is with Rebecca. She tells Luffy and company to keep going towards the next level while she and Bartolomeo prepare to fight Gladius and the giant toys.
695	67	"Risking Their Lives! Luffy is the Trump Card for Victory!"; Transliteration: "Inochi Kakete! Rufi wa Shōri no Kirifuda" (Japanese: 命かけて！ルフィは勝利の切り札)	Tetsuya Endō	Tomohiro Nakayama	May 31, 2015	November 24, 2024
Now that Rebecca has reached the flower field, Leo leaves with Kabu to rescue Mansherry. Rebecca stays to waits for Luffy, but her brief respite turns to horror when she sees her mother's killer, Diamante, standing before her. Gladius first attacks with multiple rupture balls sent at Luffy, but Bartolomeo blocks them with a large barrier, which he then converts into a long staircase towards the 4th level. Sabo's fight with Fujitora continues as the Admiral creates a horizontal gravity force that pushes Sabo back. Sabo on the other hand wonders if the Admiral is hiding something. As Luffy climbs the stairs, Gladius attacks him again, but Bartolomeo takes it head on, leaving him injured. Robin thanks him for helping Luffy since the Straw Hats always knew Luffy as their winning trump card. Cavendish remains behind to stall the nutcrackers while Kyros moves ahead to the fourth level.
696	68	"A Tearful Reunion! Rebecca and Kyros!"; Transliteration: "Namida no Saikai - Rebekka to Kyurosu!" (Japanese: 涙の再会 レベッカとキュロス！)	Satoshi Itō	Jin Tanaka	June 7, 2015	December 1, 2024
Diamante easily overwhelms Rebecca. Before he can kill her, however, Kyros intercepts him, and the two battle. Luffy and Law reach the Flower Field while being chased by a nutcracker, and Rebecca gives Luffy the key to Law's handcuffs, allowing Law to destroy the nutcracker. After meeting with Rebecca, Luffy and Law head for the palace, and Diamante fails to stop them. However, Sugar is heading for them, eager to turn the two into toys and gain revenge.
697	69	"One Shot One Kill! The Man Who Will Save Dressrosa!"; Transliteration: "Ichigeki-hikkoro - Doresurōza o Sukuu Otoko" (Japanese: 一撃必殺 ドレスローザを救う男)	Masahiro Hosoda	Atsuhiro Tomioka	June 14, 2015	December 8, 2024
Kanjuro finishes his artwork and Usopp uses it as ammo to snipe at Sugar. He has Viola use her ability while Doldo, Hack, Tank, Kin'emon, and Kanjuro hold the citizens off as long as they can. Scared that he will lose his captain and friend, Usopp will attempt an impossible shot at Sugar from the plateau before the citizens stops him. With Viola's insight, he prepares to fire the special shot prepared with Kanjuro's help but at the last moment, Usopp awakens his Observation Haki, and sees Luffy's aura and fires before the Dressrosa citizens caught him and everyone else with him. Viola watches as the shot successfully reaches Sugar where it takes the shape of Usopp's face which first defeated Sugar, scaring her again into unconsciousness. With the last obstacle gone, Luffy and Law finally reached Doflamingo himself.
698	70	"Anger Erupts! Luffy and Law's Ultimate Stratagem!"; Transliteration: "Ikari Bakuhatsu - Rufi to Rō Saikyō no Hisaku" (Japanese: 怒り爆発 ルフィ・(と)ロー最強の秘策)	Tatsuya Nagamine	Shōji Yonemura	June 21, 2015	December 15, 2024
The battle between Robin's group and the nutcracker army comes to a stop as the toys revert into their human selves due to Sugar being knocked unconscious again. At the palace, Doflamingo questions Luffy's decision to help a former enemy like Bellamy, but Luffy tells him that past is behind him. Doflamingo then berates Bellamy calling him a lowlife. Angered, Luffy tries to kick Doflamingo but hits Bellamy instead when the Warlord uses him like a shield. Law admonishes Luffy to not get angry since Doflamingo likes to provoke his enemies. Doflamingo then tells the duo that he is sick of them ruining his plans and that they remind him of the anger he experienced 13 years ago. Law says if it were not for that time, he would not be standing here, but Doflamingo retorts that if he did not do it, Law would have been the "third Corazon" and then attacks Law with a string clone. All the while, Luffy fights a controlled Bellamy. Mad at the Warlord for sitting through the fight, Luffy tells Law that he's gonna take down Doflamingo and readies an attack on Law. Law then creates a ROOM and switches with Doflamingo, causing him to be struck by Luffy's Red Hawk. Trebol is shocked by this surprise, before being incapacitated by Law's Radio Knife. Law tells Luffy that he's the worst but Luffy remarks that he is also part of the same generation.
699	71	"A Noble Family! The True Identity of Doflamingo!"; Transliteration: "Kedakaki Ichizoku - Dofuramingo no Shōtai!" (Japanese: 気高き一族 ドフラミンゴの正体！)	Aya Komaki	Tomohiro Nakayama	June 28, 2015	January 12, 2025
Doflamingo recovers from Luffy's Red Hawk and continues his fight with him and Law. On the streets of Dressrosa, Sabo is being scolded by Koala for fighting a Marine Admiral since it will attract unwanted attention to the Revolutionaries. Usopp and the others at the Plateau are released by the citizens since the people are confused at all of the chaos. They beg to their former king for help, but Riku tells them to trust Luffy to overthrow Doflamingo. Admiral Fujitora also declares his trust in Luffy. Trebol is having difficulty in reforming himself after being cut to pieces by Law. Before Law can attack him again, Doflamingo stops and brutally skewers Law with strings. Luffy tries to fight, but Doflamingo overcomes him and binds him, leaving him at the mercy of the controlled Bellamy. Doflamingo tells them that he hates people looking down at him and reveals he was once a Celestial Dragon as well as his family's past, of how his father made the family leave the life of luxury and how his mother died of illness because of their fallen status. Doflamingo held his father with disdain and killed him, hoping to return to the life of a World Noble but was rejected by them, leaving him to swear to destroy the entire world ruled by them.
700	72	"The Ultimate Power! The Secret of the Op-Op Fruit!"; Transliteration: "Kyūkyoku no Chikara - Ope-Ope no Mi no Himitsu!" (Japanese: 究極の力 オペオペの実の秘密！)	Kentarō Fujita	Jin Tanaka	July 5, 2015	January 19, 2025
The Navy are having difficulty maintaining order in the streets of Dressrosa as they deal with rampaging animals and pillaging pirates as well as the absence of Admiral Fujitora. Luffy is struggling against a Doflamingo clone and a string-controlled Bellamy while Law questions Doflamingo's feat in manipulating CP-0 and the World Government. Doflamingo explains that he learned of a national treasure that the World Nobles would not want revealed and used this knowledge to blackmail them into granting him their power. He also reveals the full potential of Law's Op-Op Fruit with its power to give eternal life at the cost of the user's own life, but Law is not interested in using it and states that it's thanks to Corazon that he has the power to defeat Doflamingo. Law then remembers his time in the Donquixote Pirates 16 years ago when he discovered that he had little over three years to live, which fueled his desire to destroy everything. He was part of the new recruits that recently joined the crew and met Corazon, a clumsy but talented officer of Doflamingo's crew. Law also learned the hard way that Corazon hates children when he was thrown out the window.
701	73	"Sad Memories! Law, the Boy from the White Town!"; Transliteration: "Kanashiki Kioku - Shiroi Machi no Shōnen Rō!" (Japanese: 悲しき記憶 白い町の少年ロー！)	Katsumi Tokoro	Shōji Yonemura	July 12, 2015	January 26, 2025
At dinner, Doflamingo discusses their next target, and Law enters as the group notices a white patch on his chest. Recognizing it as Amber Lead Syndrome, Giolla is silenced by Doflamingo, who explains it's caused by poisoning. Law reveals he escaped Flevance by hiding under corpses and declares his desire for revenge. The next day, the Donquixote Pirates raid a pirate hideout. Baby 5 asks about Flevance and learns it was once a prosperous city built on Amber Lead, a toxic substance secretly exploited by the World Government. The poison accumulated over generations, killing children before adulthood. When mass deaths began, surrounding nations quarantined Flevance, abandoning its people. In the past, Law's family desperately sought help, but no doctors from the outside would come. His sister, Lami, grew weaker, and as soldiers massacred civilians, Law reassured her with lies. When soldiers stormed the hospital, Law hid Lami, only to later find his parents dead. He escaped, later discovering the murdered children and nun who had promised him hope. In the present, Senor Pink reflects on Flevance's destruction, and Law, now consumed by rage, stabs Corazon.
702	74	"A Celestial Dragon! Doffy's Stormy Past!"; Transliteration: "Tenryūbito! Dofi no Sōzetsu-naru Kako" (Japanese: 天竜人！ドフィの壮絶なる過去)	Yoshihiro Ueda	Atsuhiro Tomioka	July 19, 2015	February 2, 2025
As Doflamingo sleeps, he dreams of his past, where an angry mob tortures his family, seeking revenge on the former World Nobles. Seventeen years ago, Doflamingo's father, Homing, renounced their noble status, believing they were always human. However, the commoners turned against them, burning their home. The family fled but was rejected by the World Nobles. Struggling to survive, Doflamingo and Rosinante resorted to stealing food, but their mother fell ill and died. Blaming Homing, Doflamingo cursed his father as an angry mob found them. Doflamingo awakes in a cold sweat as he is informed of Law's actions. Law is caught trying to escape but is instead welcomed into the Donquixote Pirates. Doflamingo sees potential in him and promises to train him as his right-hand man. Corazon hides Law's attack on him, raising the young child's suspicion. The crew moves their base while expanding operations, engaging in battles and heists. Law trains under various executives and grows stronger. Two years later, Law reveals his full name, Trafalgar D. Water Law, alarming Corazon. Realizing Law carries the secret initial "D," Corazon, finally breaking his silence, warns him to stay away from Doflamingo.
703	75	"A Rocky Road! Law and Corazon's Journey of Life!"; Transliteration: "Kunan no Michi - Rō to Korason Inochi no Tabi" (Japanese: 苦難の道 ローとコラソン命の旅)	Tetsuya Endō	Hirohiko Kamisaka	August 2, 2015	February 9, 2025
Corazon explains to Law the significance of the name "D", revealing that those who bear it are considered to be the sworn enemies of gods. He confides in Law about his own secret motives, not revealing his connection to the navy, and also shares that he ate the Calm-Calm Fruit, which nullifies sounds. When Law threatens to expose Corazon's motives to Doflamingo, he later reconsiders due to Corazon not telling him about the stabbing incident from two years back. Corazon initially takes Law against his will to multiple hospitals in vain attempts to treat his White Lead disease. Six months later, with Law's condition worsening, they camp by the ocean. Corazon, thinking Law is asleep, expresses his regret that Law has to relive the pain he felt years earlier in Flevance. He tears up, admitting that Law's pain is far greater than his. Law, though awake, listens in silence, moved to tears. Back in the present, Law presses on with his attack on Doflamingo, vowing to never forget Corazon's tears. Meanwhile, Luffy dodges Bellamy's attacks in the palace but soon realizes that a Doflamingo string clone is behind him.
704	76	"The Time Is Ticking Down! Seize the Op-Op Fruit!"; Transliteration: "Toki Semaru! Ope-Ope no Mi o Ubae!" (Japanese: 時迫る！オペオペの実を奪え！)	Masahiro Hosoda	Hirohiko Kamisaka	August 9, 2015	February 16, 2025
Under attack from Doflamingo's string clone and a controlled Bellamy, Luffy blocks the string clone's Goshikito with a Haki-covered leg before being sent flying into a wall by a slash from Bellamy, only to get up and note the attack did not cut the strings binding his hands. Hearing a rumble from above, Luffy realizes Law is in trouble and uses Gear Third to pump up both his forearms before coating them in Armament Haki and tearing the strings apart, to the string clone's surprise. Meanwhile, on the roof above, Law gets up while bleeding and glares at Doflamingo, who laughs, and Law recalls events from 13 years ago. In the past, Corazon learns of his brother's intentions of stealing the Op-Op Fruit and having him eat it. He resolves to steal it from the pirate planning to sell to the navy, Diaz Barrels, himself in order to have Law cure himself. Meanwhile, Doflamingo asks Trebol, Pica, and Diamante if they have noticed how the navy has stop chasing them since Corazon left. Diamante asks Doflamingo if he believes Corazon had been tipping off the navy before this and notes that it could just be a coincidence, prompting Doflamingo to claim that he hopes it is because Corazon is his biological brother. Three days before the fruit is scheduled to be traded to the navy, Rosinante infiltrates the hideout of the Barrels Pirates and successfully steals the fruit, but is caught and attacked.
705	77	"The Moment of Resolution! Corazon's Farewell Smile!"; Transliteration: "Kakugo no Toki - Korason Wakare no Egao!" (Japanese: 覚悟の時 コラソン別れの笑顔！)	Satoshi Itō	Tomohiro Nakayama	August 16, 2015	February 23, 2025
Corazon force-feeds Law the Op-Op Fruit and has him deliver an important message to the navy about Doflamingo's plan to take over Dressrosa, but Law unknowingly gives the message to a Donquixote pirate, Vergo, who brutally beats him and Corazon before informing Doflamingo of Rosinante's treachery. The Donquixote Pirates arrive on Minion Island, and Doflamingo traps the remaining pirates in his Birdcage as Corazon resolves to have Law survive and remember his smile.
706	78	"Advance, Law! The Kindhearted Man's Final Fight!"; Transliteration: "Ike Rō - Yasashiki Otoko Saigo no Tatakai!" (Japanese: 行けロー 優しき男最期の戦い！)	Tatsuya Nagamine	Jin Tanaka	August 23, 2015	March 2, 2025
After killing Barrels and recalling how he killed his father and met his executives as a child, Doflamingo confronts his brother, Corazon, over the latter's betrayal of his crew. Corazon having place Law in a chest and uses his Calm-Calm powers to keep him silent. After learning that Law has eaten the Op-Op Fruit and being tricked into believing that he has already left the island when they hear that the navy took a young boy into custody, unaware that it's actually Barrels' son, the young X Drake, Doflamingo shoots his brother and unknowingly has his crew transport Law to safety. Corazon wills himself to stay alive to maintain his powers effects on Law long enough for approaching Marine battleships to attack, allowing the cannon fire to drown out the grieving Law's cries.
707	79	"To Be Free! Law's Injection Shot Blasts!"; Transliteration: "Jiyū e! Rō Injekushon Shotto Sakuretsu" (Japanese: 自由へ！ロー注射(インジェクション)ショット炸裂)	Yoshihiro Ueda	Shōji Yonemura	August 30, 2015	March 9, 2025
Law clashes with Doflamingo, and asks him about Luffy and the name D. Doflamingo dismisses the legends surrounding the name as mere superstition. Law then reveals to Doflamingo that he is a D. as well, leading Doflamingo to cause major damage to the palace roof. Elsewhere, Viola keeps an eye on all the battles that are going on, most of which are causing a lot of injuries. In Kyros' battle against Diamante, Diamante causes the ground to shake, and Leo is hot on the trail of Princess Mansherry. The Corrida Colosseum combatants have trouble fighting off the officers of the Donquixote Pirates. Enraged at Law for being a D., Doflamingo gets up close to attack him. Too late, Law uses Injection Shot to pierce him through the midsection. Law states that he has come to kill Doflamingo in place of Corazon.
708	80	"An Intense Battle! Law vs. Doflamingo!"; Transliteration: "Atsuki Tatakai - Rō tai Dofuramingo" (Japanese: 熱き闘い ローVS(たい)ドフラミンゴ)	Kentarō Fujita	Atsuhiro Tomioka	September 6, 2015	March 9, 2025
Law and Doflamingo fight, with Law swearing to avenge Corazon. However, Doflamingo gets the upper hand. Meanwhile, Zoro and Pica continue fighting, with Pica continuing to get larger. Some of Pica's soldiers attempt to stop Zoro, but they are defeated by Orlumbus. Pica then inhabits the entire King's Plateau and laughs at Zoro, which causes the latter to make fun of him again. This causes Pica to get enraged and raise large spikes from the ground. Doflamingo mocks Law for letting his emotions cloud his judgment and on how his mistake with Corazon's message allowed Dressrosa's takeover, though Law states it would not have even mattered. Doflamingo agrees, stating that even if the message was delivered, he would have taken the throne one way or another and cuts off Law's right arm. Doflamingo says he'll "forgive" Law in the same way he forgave his father and brother, by killing them. Luffy continues to struggle against Doflamingo's clone and Bellamy. Eventually, he gets by Bellamy and defeats the string clone, sending him back to Doflamingo and saving Law from getting killed.
709	81	"A Decisive Battle Against the Executives! Proud Hajrudin!"; Transliteration: "Kanbu Kessen - Hokori Takaki Hairudin" (Japanese: 幹部決戦 誇り高きハイルディン)	Katsumi Tokoro	Jin Tanaka	September 13, 2015	March 16, 2025
Luffy, who is still fighting Bellamy, tells Doflamingo to release Bellamy and he obliges. Bellamy starts to reminisce about his past, including asking to join Doflamingo, fighting Luffy in Mock Town, and meeting him again in the Colosseum. Luffy promises to beat up Doflamingo and Trebol for him, but Bellamy stops him. Bellamy uses Spring Hopper and darts around the room preparing to fight Luffy. Pica's habitation of the King's Plateau causes him to interrupt the fight between the Colosseum combatants and the Donquixote executives. Ideo lands a hit on Dellinger while Sai is confused with Baby 5's actions, who mistakes his intentions as romantic advances. Hajrudin is beaten down Machvise who repeatedly uses his Devil Fruit powers to increase his weight by tens of tons to crush him. When Machvise tries to attack Zoro, Hajrudin, determined to repay his debt to the Straw Hats, wills himself up. Machvise increases his weight to ten-thousand tons to finish him but Hajrudin counters with a powerful punch and manages to send Machvise flying into the Birdcage, shredding him. Victorious, Hajrudin collapses from his injuries with Zoro promising that the Birdcage will be gone when he wakes up.
710	82	"The Battle of Love! The New Leader Sai vs. Baby 5!"; Transliteration: "Ai no Kessen - Shin Tōryō Sai tai Bebī Faibu" (Japanese: 愛の決戦 新棟梁サイVS(たい)ベビー5(ファイブ))	Aya Komaki	Tomohiro Nakayama	September 20, 2015	March 16, 2025
Luffy and Bellamy continue their confrontation. Meanwhile, Baby 5 mistakes Sai's words as a proposal, while Chinjao struggles against Lao G's Geo-Fist techniques. Hearing Sai's and Baby 5's conversation Chinjao, also misunderstanding, reminds Sai he's arranged to be married to the daughter of the Niho Navy's leader to form an alliance. When Baby 5 asks Sai how to be of use to him he jokingly tells her to die, which she responds by happily preparing to commit suicide. In a flashback, it's revealed that as a young child, Baby 5 was abandoned by her mother who called her useless and unwanted, which is why she is willing to do whatever's asked of her as a way to feel needed. Not wanting to win this way, Sai tries to stop her, but Chinjao attacks him for trying to help an enemy. Sai counters resulting in Chinjao's head drill getting bent, before slapping Baby 5 and telling her to value her life more. Chinjao awakens and instead of being angry, is proud of Sai for surpassing him and officially dubs him the head of the Happo Navy, promises to break off Sai's engagement and bestows his technique on Sai's leg, before being struck down by Lao G, who had used a technique to restore his body to its prime. In retaliation, Sai challenges Lao G. Sai declares to take Baby 5 as his wife before defeating Lao G with his grandfather's "Drill Dragon Nail" technique.
711	83	"The Man's Pride! Bellamy's Last Charge!"; Transliteration: "Otoko no Iji - Beramī Saigo no Totsugeki!" (Japanese: 男の意地 ベラミー最期の突撃！)	Toshinori Fukuzawa	Shōji Yonemura	September 27, 2015	March 23, 2025
As Lao G is defeated, Zoro notes Sai's strength and decides to keep in mind how powerful he is. Sai rushes to his injured grandfather, Chinjao, while Baby 5 prepares for both a wedding and a funeral, angering them both. Above them, Zoro dodges Pica's attacks and destroys his stone face, but Pica escapes. Elizabello II offers to help, but Zoro insists on handling Pica alone. Meanwhile, on Flower Hill, Kyros struggles to stay balanced as Diamante taunts him about Scarlet's death. Kyros attacks, but Diamante deflects with his steel cape and targets Rebecca. As Kyros protects her, he vows to avenge Scarlet and never let Rebecca fight again. Elsewhere, Sabo rescues a mother and daughter from a burning building before hearing about trapped fighters at the colosseum. He rushes off after the soldier leading him. At the palace, Luffy battles Bellamy, begging him to stop, but Bellamy continues attacking recklessly. Right above them, Doflamingo and Trebol defeat Law. Meanwhile below the palace, Gladius prepares an explosion to kill Cavendish, who demands Bartolomeo let him into his barrier before it detonates.
712	84	"A Strong Wind and a Surge! Hakuba vs. Dellinger!"; Transliteration: "Shippūdotō - Hakuba tai Derinjā" (Japanese: 疾風怒濤 ハクバVS(たい)デリンジャー)	Tetsuya Endō	Jin Tanaka	October 4, 2015	March 23, 2025
With Bartolomeo's help, Cavendish survives Gladius' attack though the two start to argue. Gladius' attempt to attack Robin but is blocked by Bartolomeo's barriers. Gladius' subordinates are knocked out by Bartolomeo's Barrier Bulls, with Cavendish and Gladius running from it as well due to Bartolomeo's overexcitement at getting winked at by Robin. Despite being critically injured, Ideo continues to fight Dellinger hoping to buy time for Luffy to beat Doflamingo, revealing he's a member of the Longarm Tribe, having concealed his extra joints in his shoulders. In response, Dellinger reveals he's half-fighting fish fish-man before sprouting fangs and savagely biting into Ideo, defeating him. Dellinger reaches the third level to aid Gladius, but is swiftly and brutally defeated by Hakuba. Bartolomeo tries to make sense of the situation and realizes the incident in Block D of the tournament was Hakuba's doing. Hakuba then attacks Bartolomeo, who remains unharmed thanks to his barrier. Hakuba then proceeds to attack Robin, but she restricts him with several arms sprouting from his body.
713	85	"Barrier-Barrier! Homage Holy Fist Strikes!"; Transliteration: "Bari-Bari - Omāju Shinken Hatsudō!" (Japanese: バリバリ オマージュ神拳発動！)	Masahiro Hosoda	Tomohiro Nakayama	October 11, 2015	March 30, 2025
While being restrained by Robin, Cavendish struggles to regain control of his body from Hakuba. Gladius attempts to blow up both Robin and Cavendish by rupturing the cliffside they are on. When Bartolomeo tries to stop him, Gladius shoots him with his paralytic-coated needle-like hair, before inflating himself, threatening to injure Robin if he ruptures. Seeing no other option Bartolomeo traps both himself and Gladius in a barrier before stabbing him causing Gladius to explode. Though injured by the explosion, Bartolomeo contains the blast. Galdius, having only been stabbed in the shoulder, survives and ruptures the cliffside, but Cavendish manages to carry Robin to safety using Hakuba's speed while also keeping Hakuba from hurting her. Enraged at being unable to protect Robin, Bartolomeo forms a barrier around his fist and vows to grow stronger as to be someone who can properly help Luffy before defeating Gladius with an homage to Luffy. While Bartolomeo proclaims to never work with someone as troublesome as Cavendish again, Robin arrives at the Flower Hill just in time to protect Rebecca from Diamante's attack.
714	86	"The Healing Princess! Save Mansherry!"; Transliteration: "Iyashi no Hime - Mansherī o Sukue!" (Japanese: 癒しの姫 マンシェリーを救え！)	Yoshihiro Ueda	Hirohiko Kamisaka	October 18, 2015	March 30, 2025
On Flower Hill, Robin protects Rebecca allowing Kyros to continue battling Diamante. Meanwhile, the fallen Donquixote Pirates executives are brought to Giolla, and she attempts to revive them with Mansherry's Heal-Heal Fruit powers as she did with Sugar before, but Mansherry refuses to help them. Upon realizing that Mansherry's tears have healing properties Giolla begins to callously beat her to make her cry just as Leo and Kabu arrive. Kabu knocks the executives out of the way before the tears can revive them. Leo proceeds to stitch the executives and subordinates to Giolla before smashing them into her, defeating her. Meanwhile, Luffy continues fighting Bellamy.
715	87	"The Manly Duel! Señor's Elegy of Love!"; Transliteration: "Otoko no Kettō - Senyōru Ai no Banka" (Japanese: 男の決闘 セニョール愛の挽歌)	Satoshi Itō	Hirohiko Kamisaka	October 25, 2015	April 6, 2025
Luffy continues fighting Bellamy, urging him to stop, but Bellamy refuses. Meanwhile, Leo, Mansherry, and Kabu escape the palace. Kabu mentally derides Leo for his obliviousness towards Mansherry's crush on him. Giolla attempts to alert Doflamingo that Mansherry has been taken, which would ruin their backup plan to use her powers to rebuild the SMILE Factory if it's destroyed, but she loses consciousness before she can do so. At the factory's entrance, Franky and Señor Pink engage in a fierce, honorable brawl, refusing to dodge each other's blows. Señor Pink grabs Franky using his Devil Fruit powers and performs a high-speed suplex off the top of a building, declaring that whoever is left standing afterward wins. Franky rises from the crater that's created from the suplex's impact and pummels Pink in return. During the beating, Pink recalls his tragic past: he once lied to his wife, Russian, about being a banker since she hated pirates. They married and had a son, Gimlet, who later died of a fever while he was away. When Russian discovered he was not actually a banker, she fled in a fierce storm and ended up in a landslide. Though she survived, she was permanently left in a vegetative state. Pink, consumed by guilt, continued visiting her and eventually dressed like their late son in an attempt to get a reaction from her, which she did by smiling, touching him deeply.
716	88	"Stardust of Death! Diamante's Storm of Vicious Attacks!"; Transliteration: "Shi no Hoshikuzu - Diamante Mōkō no Arashi" (Japanese: 死の星屑 ディアマンテ猛攻の嵐)	Aya Komaki	Shōji Yonemura	November 1, 2015	April 6, 2025
Señor Pink continues to remember of when he started to dress like a baby, despite being mocked and ridiculed by everyone, as it was the only thing that made Russian smile, before he is defeated by Franky, who wipes the tears from the defeated Señor Pink's eyes and tells him if they ever meet again that they should have a drink together and he can tell him about the woman Russian. Franky leads the dwarves to attack the SMILE Factory before collapsing. Meanwhile, Kyros continues to battle Diamante who use his ultimate technique, Death Enjambre, to fire confetti into the air before changing them back into spiked iron balls that rain down from the sky while protecting himself under an iron umbrella. Robin creates an umbrella made of flowers to protect her and Rebecca, while Kyros skillfully repels the assault until Diamante shoots him in the leg. Despite being injured, Kyros continues to endure while convincing Rebecca to not shed blood with her innocent hands.
717	89	"Trueno Bastardo! Kyros' Furious Strike!"; Transliteration: "Turueno Basutādo! Kyurosu Ikari no Ichigeki!" (Japanese: 雷の破壊剣(トゥルエノバスタード)！キュロス怒りの一撃！)	Tatsuya Nagamine	Jin Tanaka	November 8, 2015	April 13, 2025
Even in the iron rain, Kyros continues his grueling battle with Diamante. As the spiked iron balls stop falling, Kyros stumbles due to his shot leg with Diamante preparing to finish him while constantly taunting him about Scarlett's death. Kyros regains his footing before landing a powerful rage-filled strike to Diamante finally defeating him. With the battle over, Kyros and Rebecca share a quiet moment in front of Scarlett's grave as Viola delivers the news of Kyros' victory. As the citizens celebrate, Riku decides to go down to help those in town, with Tank and the citizens following soon after. Meanwhile, Pica abandons his fight with Zoro to confront Kyros.
718	90	"Moving Across the Ground! The Giant Statue Pica's Surprise Maneuver!"; Transliteration: "Daichi Ōdan - Kyozō Pīka Kishū Sakusen!" (Japanese: 大地横断 巨像ピーカ奇襲作戦！)	Kentarō Fujita	Tomohiro Nakayama	November 15, 2015	April 13, 2025
Luffy continues facing down Bellamy, but still refuses to fight back. On the fourth level, Pica questions Kyros and Rebecca about King Riku. Kyros declares Riku both family and his own personal savior, and says that the people of Dressrosa still hope for his return to the throne. Upon hearing this, Pica disappears and descends to the lower levels, attacking the wounded fighters. He emerges back with his massive stone body and begins marching toward the King's Plateau to kill King Riku, causing widespread destruction in the process. Enraged by Pica's cowardliness, Zoro tries to come up with a plan to stop him from reaching the plateau. He concludes that a long-range slash would be too weak, jumping onto Pica is physically impossible, and that warning Usopp and the others is futile due to the distance and him losing his own personal Transponder Snail. Concluding there's virtually no time for everyone on the plateau to evacuate regardless, Zoro meets up with Sai, Chinjao, Baby 5, Orlumbus, and Elizabello. He asks Elizabello for two minutes to prepare and schemes up with a bold new plan: launch himself into the sky and slice Pica up directly.
719	91	"A Decisive Battle in Midair! Zoro's New Special Secret Technique Blasts!"; Transliteration: "Kūchū Kessen - Zoro Shin Hissatsu Ōgi Sakuretsu!" (Japanese: 空中決戦 ゾロ新必殺奥義炸裂！)	Katsumi Tokoro	Shōji Yonemura	November 22, 2015	April 20, 2025
Pica reaches the King's Plateau and mocks King Riku for lacking the military strength to protect Dressrosa. Riku concedes the point, admitting he will never reclaim the throne, though he insists he always tried to be a good man. As Pica prepares to strike, Zoro has Orlumbus hurl him through the air at high speed. Mid-flight, Zoro coats his blades in Armament Haki and delivers a massive horizontal slash, cleaving Pica's giant stone body in half. The crowd watches in shock, but Zoro quickly realizes Pica escaped into the upper portion of the stone colossus. He leaps after it and unleashes another vertical slash, splitting the upper half cleanly in two. As the sections collapse, Zoro observes Pica retreating into the left arm. Noticing the fingers twitch, Zoro declares Pica cannot hide in midair. He slices the massive stone hand apart, severing the fingers, then divides the arm into five chunks. Forced out of hiding, Pica emerges, coating his own body in full-body Armament Haki for a final desperate charge. Zoro responds with his powerful technique, Three Thousand World, striking Pica down once and for all. However, the remains of Pica's shattered stone giant plummet toward the King's Plateau, threatening to crush everyone below. At the last moment, King Elizabello unleashes his devastating King Punch, obliterating the rubble. Though annoyed that such effort was wasted on debris, Elizabello earns Zoro's praise, who commends him for a job well done.
720	92	"So Long! Bellamy's Farewell Blow!"; Transliteration: "Abayo! Beramī Wakare no Ichigeki!" (Japanese: あばよ！ベラミー別れの一撃！)	Tetsuya Endō	Hirohiko Kamisaka	November 29, 2015	April 20, 2025
Citizens and fighters around the country react to Pica's defeat as Mansherry meets Kyros, who tells her to use her healing powers on those who need it more than he does. The SMILE Factory is destroyed by the dwarves, and Sabo prepares to meet Luffy at the palace. Bellamy continues his assault against Luffy, still trying to convince Luffy to fight back reminiscing about how he came to respect him after their first meeting, before deciding to end their fight, while silently thanking Luffy for calling him a friend. Luffy defeats Bellamy with one hit again and then he screams out Doflamingo's name in anguish. Doflamingo, however, has a shock in store for him.
721	93	"Law Dies! Luffy's Raging Onslaught!"; Transliteration: "Rō Shisu - Rufi Fundo no Mōkōgeki!" (Japanese: ロー死す ルフィ憤怒の猛攻撃！)	Yoshihiro Ueda	Jin Tanaka	December 6, 2015	April 27, 2025
As Doflamingo summons Luffy to the rooftop, events from minutes earlier are revealed: Trebol hurls Law to the roof's edge with Sticky Launcher, leaving him gravely injured. Standing over him, Trebol mocks Law's persistence, while Doflamingo expresses pity, claiming Law's escape from Flevance, his bond with Corazon, years of plotting, and alliance with Luffy have all been in vain. Pointing a gun at him, Doflamingo offers Law a final chance: perform the Perennial Youth Operation on him in exchange for any wish. Feigning interest, Law demands the impossible: resurrecting Corazon and forcing Doflamingo to submit to Dressrosa's citizens. Calling Doflamingo's life pathetic, Law declares that the Straw Hats can make miracles happen. Enraged, Doflamingo shoots Law eight times and mocks the "Corazon" stitched on his coat, vowing the Heart legacy will die with him. Elsewhere, Tank Lepanto rallies citizens to aid King Riku, while Viola informs Zoro and Usopp that only Doflamingo and Trebol remains, though their side was battered as well. Back on the roof, Luffy bursts through the palace ceiling, launching a Third Gear strike, which Doflamingo blocks with Spider's Web. Luffy counters with Hawk Gatling, but Doflamingo traps him in strings with Break White. Luffy tears free only to stumble into a pool of blood and find Law unresponsive. Doflamingo coldly pronounces Law to be dead as the shrinking Birdcage presses closer. Mocking Law's last words, he declares the battle over as Luffy faintly hears Law's voice urging him to listen carefully.
722	94	"A Blade of Tenacity! The Gamma Knife Counterattack!"; Transliteration: "Shūnen no Ha - Gyakushū no Ganma Naifu!" (Japanese: 執念の刃 逆襲のガンマナイフ！)	Masahiro Hosoda	Tomohiro Nakayama	December 13, 2015	April 27, 2025
Doflamingo shrinks the Birdcage, causing the citizens of Dressrosa to run away in panic. Luffy fights Doflamingo, but Law switches places with him in order to land his land his strongest attack, Gamma Knife, on Doflamingo, destroying his body from the inside and forcing the Warlord to his knees. Doflamingo attempts to retaliate but is knocked back by Luffy. Law explains that after he got shot the first, he reduced his lifespan to create a ROOM so large its boundaries could not be seen and swap places with one of Doflamingo underlings and swap back after Doflamingo stop shooting. Law stops Luffy from attacking, insisting he needs to be the one to end it before preparing to finish Doflamingo off and avenge Corazon.
723	95	"A Collision of Haki! Luffy vs. Doflamingo!"; Transliteration: "Haki Gekitotsu - Rufi tai Dofuramingo" (Japanese: 覇気激突 ルフィVS(たい)ドフラミンゴ)	Satoshi Itō	Shōji Yonemura	December 20, 2015	May 4, 2025
Law stands over the wounded Doflamingo. He performs Counter Shock to finish Doflamingo off before collapsing from his injuries. However, Doflamingo uses his powers to revive himself, sticking up his injured organs and prepares to kill the weakened Law. Luffy stops Doflamingo, and the two clash using Haoshoku Haki, knocking Law and Trebol away. During the battle, Trebol remembers how he found a young Doflamingo and gave him the power to kill anyone he wanted. Though Luffy manages to get a few hits in, Doflamingo knocks him back with a powerful kick.
724	96	"Unassailable! The Stunning Secret of Trebol!"; Transliteration: "Kōgeki Funō - Torēboru Shōgeki no Himitsu" (Japanese: 攻撃不能 トレーボル衝撃の秘密)	Directed by : Yasunori Koyama; Storyboarded by : Aya Komaki	Hirohiko Kamisaka	December 27, 2015	May 4, 2025
As Luffy is knocked back, he is caught and immobilized by Trebol. Luffy attempt to fight back using Armament Haki, but his punches go right though him, much to Luffy's confusion, as Trebol question Luffy's assumption of his Devil Fruit being a Logia. Law tells Luffy that fighting Trebol is futile, while revealing Trebol's slime is in fact mucus, before he begins to insult Trebol and the other executives. The infuriated Trebol proceeds to immobilize Law as well and explains how he and the other three Donquixote executives found Doflamingo and raised him into the man he is today. However, Law continues mocks Trebol, saying that he's only Doflamingo's puppet, causing the executive to attack him in anger. As Law forms a ROOM as Trebol ignored Doflamingo warnings, believing Law is helpless, before attempting to kill Law. However, Law, stating he would not face his crew if he left Trebol and Doflamingo to Luffy alone, levitates his severed arm holding his sword to vertically slash Trebol across the chest, defeating him. Trebol's mucus covering has slipped off, revealing him to be incredibly skinny, leading Luffy to realize the way his attacks did not work. Further enraged, Trebol causes a large explosion as a last resort. Luffy, Law, and Doflamingo manage to escape and fly toward the Flower Field, and Luffy gives Law to Robin, but Doflamingo attacks her.
725	97	"Anger Erupts! I Will Take Everything Upon Myself!"; Transliteration: "Ikari Bakuhatsu - Ore ga Zenbu Hikiukeru" (Japanese: 怒り爆発 おれが全部引き受ける)	Directed by : Kentarō Fujita; Storyboarded by : Tatsuya Nagamine	Atsuhiro Tomioka	January 10, 2016	May 18, 2025
Cavendish intercepts Doflamingo's attack on Robin, giving Luffy space to focus on his fight. Luffy urges Cavendish to evacuate the plateau, and Bartolomeo constructs a barrier staircase for escape. As Robin, Rebecca, and Kyros descend, Law regains consciousness and refuses to leave. He insists on witnessing the battle he helped create, vowing to share in Luffy's victory or his downfall. Robin counters that Luffy only fights for his own reasons, but Law remains firm. Respecting his resolve, Cavendish and the dwarves choose to stay behind with him. Meanwhile, Doflamingo taunts Luffy, recalling his shock upon learning of the "D" in his name and revealing he has tracked the Straw Hats since Crocodile's defeat. The Birdcage steadily tightens around Dressrosa, and Luffy realizes time is running short. Despite their clash of blows, Doflamingo seizes the advantage, knocking Luffy down and questioning whether he can truly win before the Birdcage closes. Doflamingo outlines the timeline of despair: in thirty minutes, slower citizens will be trapped; in forty, screams will echo; and in fifty, the island will drown in blood. He sneers that Dressrosa would still be "peaceful" had Luffy and his crew never arrived. But Luffy, recalling the suffering of the enslaved toys and gladiators, rejects the notion of peace under tyranny. Refusing to yield, he raises his arm, ready to unleash his ultimate trump card: Fourth Gear.
726	98	"Fourth Gear! The Phenomenal Bounce-man!"; Transliteration: "Gia Fōsu! Kyōi no Baundo-man!" (Japanese: ギア4(フォース)！驚異のバウンドマン！)	Toshinori Fukuzawa	Jin Tanaka	January 17, 2016	May 18, 2025
As the Birdcage closes in on Dressrosa, marines and pirates alike assist the handicapped. Sai then orders the Corrida Colosseum gladiators who are still standing to rescue the fallen and take them out of the plateau. Meanwhile, Viola, Usopp, and Hack climb down the King's Plateau, and Viola notices that the center of the Birdcage is shifting toward Doflamingo's location, meaning even the King's Plateau will be sliced apart. At the Flower Field, Leo and Mansherry use their abilities to reattach Law's severed arm, while Cavendish tells Law that defeating Doflamingo would cause ripples all over the world, and Law replies that that is what they were after. Back at the palace, Luffy activates Gear Fourth: Bounceman, which causes his torso to balloon and forces him to constantly bounce, while also covering his arms legs and upper torso in Armament Haki. Doflamingo laughs at this new form, but Luffy retracts his fist into his arm and punches him, blowing him into the city far below. Luffy follows using elastic force from his legs to fly and lands more large blows on Doflamingo as the Warlord struggles to keep on even footing. However, Luffy absorbs Doflamingo's attacks due to his body being rubbery despite being armored and continuously stretching his arms while also changing the direction of his punches.
727	99	"A Massive Counterattack! Doflamingo's Awakening!"; Transliteration: "Dai Gyakushū! Dofuramingo no Kakusei!" (Japanese: 大逆襲！ドフラミンゴの覚醒！)	Yoshihiro Ueda	Shōji Yonemura	January 24, 2016	May 25, 2025
As Law and Cavendish watch Luffy's and Doflamingo's battle from the Flower Field, Law notes that Luffy is overusing his Haki. On the palace rooftop, Jesus Burgess searches for Luffy and sees him bouncing through the town. Koala, who hides behind a pile of rubble, wonders what he wants with Luffy. As Franky and the dwarves evacuate the SMILE Factory, they realize that the Birdcage is not cutting it up, which Franky realizes is because of it being made of Seastone. Zoro, Kin'emon, and Kanjuro end up running into the group and explain to them their intention to stop the Birdcage before departing while Franky gets an idea. Luffy continues battling Doflamingo, however the Warlord reveals that his Devil Fruit has achieved a state known as Awakening, and he overwhelms Luffy by turning the surrounding area into string. Meanwhile, the people on Dressrosa continue running from the Birdcage, but start losing hope. However, Riku galvanizes them by revealing that only Doflamingo remained standing and that Luffy would free them.
728	100	"Luffy! An All-Out Leo Bazooka!"; Transliteration: "Rufi! Konshin no Shishi Bazūka" (Japanese: ルフィ！渾身の獅子バズーカ)	Katsumi Tokoro	Tomohiro Nakayama	January 31, 2016	May 25, 2025
Luffy and Doflamingo continue their battle, and Luffy manages to hit Doflamingo with a powerful attack, sending him crashing into the palace plateau. Believing Doflamingo has been defeated, the citizens begin to celebrate Gatz upon seeing Luffy realizes he's Lucy, while the citizens are confused about Luffy's real identity due to his Fourth Gear: Bounceman looking different than his picture in the newspaper as well as his constant bouncing. However, Luffy and Law notice the Birdcage is still up, meaning Doflamingo is still conscious, and Fourth Gear runs out before Luffy can deal the final blow. Seeing this, Jesus Burgess leaps down towards the town intending to steal the Gum-Gum Fruit form Luffy. As Luffy is lying on the ground and barely able to move, the citizens debate on if they can trust him due to him being a pirate. Suddenly, the ground around Doflamingo begins to crack as the citizens realize that the Warlord is still conscious, and they run in fear. Luffy attempts to stand and face Doflamingo, but falls to the ground again as Doflamingo sees his fallen opponent and smiles in delight.
729	101	"Flame Dragon King! Protect Luffy's Life!"; Transliteration: "Kaen Ryūō - Rufi no Inochi o Mamorinuke" (Japanese: 火炎竜王 ルフィの命を守りぬけ)	Tetsuya Endō	Hirohiko Kamisaka	February 14, 2016 (Note: Originally aired on February 7, but its broadcast was interrupted due to breaking news regarding a rocket launch by North Korea.)	June 1, 2025
Luffy is left lying helpless on the ground after Gear Fourth wears off, and Doflamingo makes his way toward his fallen opponent. However, Gatz and the Corrida Colosseum gladiators who had originally gone after Doflamingo's bounties arrive to help Luffy, who needs ten minutes to regain his Haki. Gatz's group is ambushed by Jesus Burgess, who is after Luffy's Devil Fruit, but Sabo arrives and battles the pirate, while also revealing his relationship with Luffy and Ace to Burgess. Sabo then combine his new powers with his fighting style to blast him with Burning Dragon Claw Fist: Flame Dragon King. Some of the gladiators go to stall Doflamingo, but the Warlord easily overwhelms them.
730	102	"Tears of Miracles! Mansherry's Fight!"; Transliteration: "Kiseki no Namida - Mansherī no Tatakai!" (Japanese: 奇跡の涙 マンシェリーの戦い！)	Masahiro Hosoda	Atsuhiro Tomioka	February 21, 2016	June 1, 2025
At the edge of the Birdcage, Zoro imbues his swords with Armament Haki trying to push the Birdcage back with Kin'emon and Kanjuro joining him as well. By the SMILE Factory, Franky tells the dwarves to push against the factory, as it would not be destroyed due to being made of Seastone, and the dwarves compile, but Doflamingo speeds it up in order to lure Luffy out. Mansherry flies over Dressrosa and uses her powers to temporarily heal the gladiators and citizens. At the south side of the palace plateau, in order to try to stop the Birdcage as well, Bartolomeo creates a barrier with Robin, Kyros, Leo and the revived colosseum fighters push against, though Leo tells them that Mansherry's healing ability will only last a few minutes. Law teleports in front of Gatz to help protect Luffy. However, Luffy has four minutes before he regains his Haki, and the Birdcage will fully close in three.
731	103	"As Long as We Breathe! Stop the Deadly Birdcage!"; Transliteration: "Inochi no Kagiri - Shi no Tori Kago o Tomero!" (Japanese: 命の限り 死の鳥カゴを止めろ！)	Directed by : Yasunori Koyama; Storyboarded by : Aya Komaki	Hirohiko Kamisaka	February 28, 2016	June 8, 2025
While Usopp instruct several citizens to aid his allies in trying to halt the Birdcage, Doflamingo finishes off the last of the colosseum fighters. Rebecca advises others to head to the New King's Plateau, but fearing the efforts of trying to stop the Birdcage might be in vain, she takes a sword and plans to face Doflamingo himself, only to find he's already being confronted by Viola. Viola tells Rebecca not to interfere before attacking Doflamingo with a knife, but he effortlessly dodges her and kicks her to the ground. Meanwhile, Fujitora appears behind Zoro and the samurai and imbues his blade in Haki and begins to push the Birdcage along with them with several marines going so as well, while those who cannot use Haki go to aid Franky at the SMILE Factory. As the navy comes to help Franky, several citizens come to aid not only them, but also Robin, Kyros, Leo and the colosseum fighters. Eventually, their titanic effort causes the cage to briefly come to a standstill. However, it quickly starts moving again, and they resume pushing. Riku Doldo III and Tank Lepanto join the effort at the SMILE Factory, with the former king praising the citizens' efforts. Viola gets back up and attacks Doflamingo again, but he easily overpowers and immobilizes her. Doflamingo then takes control of Rebecca and forces her to attack her aunt, as sixty seconds remain before the Birdcage completely closes, as well as how long until Luffy regains his Haki.
732	104	"Dead or Alive! A Fateful Countdown!"; Transliteration: "Seika Shika - Unmei no Kauntodaun" (Japanese: 生か死か 運命のカウントダウン)	Satoshi Itō	Jin Tanaka	March 6, 2016	June 8, 2025
Gatz broadcasts himself to everyone on Dressrosa in order to tell them that the gladiator Lucy is in fact Luffy, and that will return and defeat Doflamingo with one blow. Gatz acknowledges that the country may not be so quick to trust a pirate after what happened with Doflamingo, but assures them that Luffy is not like Doflamingo. He says that Luffy was called their hope by Riku Doldo III and earlier fought Doflamingo to within an inch of defeat, which causes some of the citizens to place their hope and trust in Luffy. Gatz them turns to Doflamingo and start condemning him for his actions and proclaiming that this is where he will meet his punishment, hoping to avert Doflamingo's attention away from Viola and Rebecca. Meanwhile, Mansherry's powers begin to wear off and those revived begin collapsing. An angered Doflamingo impales Gatz and then forces Rebecca to attack Viola. However, Luffy having regained his Haki, with Law's help, switches places with Viola and blocks Rebecca's attack as he confronts Doflamingo again.
733	105	"Attack on a Celestial! Luffy's King Kong Gun of Anger!"; Transliteration: "Ten o Utsu - Rufi Ikari no Kingu Kongu Gan" (Japanese: 天を討つ ルフィ怒りの大猿王銃(キングコングガン))	Toshinori Fukuzawa	Shōji Yonemura	March 20, 2016	June 15, 2025
As the citizens of Dressrosa cheer, Doflamingo observes that Luffy is at his limit, though he admits he is too. He slams Luffy down with pillars of string, then turns his sights on Rebecca, only for Law to teleport her away. Their duel resumes, with Doflamingo taking control of Luffy using his strings. Struggling, Luffy recalls training with Rayleigh, who once told him that Kong Gun wouldn't always work against massive foes. Realizing his current strength is insufficient, Luffy braces for something greater. Doflamingo mocks him, declaring that humanity should remain bound in his "cage" under divine manipulation. He claims the massacre would have been unnecessary if the people had never cut their puppet strings. But Luffy rejects his twisted philosophy, breaking free by unleashing Fourth Gear once more. Soaring into the air, he condemns Doflamingo's suffocating rule. The Warlord coldly retorts that Dressrosa's people were born as trash destined to be controlled. Luffy silences him, inflating his arm for a new attack while remembering the improved Kong Gun he once described to Rayleigh. As Doflamingo conjures sixteen Armament-Haki string spears for his God Thread, Luffy counters with his ultimate technique: Gum-Gum King Kong Gun. Their clash shakes the island, sending shockwaves across the city as the people cry out for Luffy's victory. Overwhelming Doflamingo's defenses, Luffy's colossal punch smashes through, driving him into the ground with devastating force. His shattered glasses fall as Law recalls Corazon's words: those bearing the "D" are enemies of gods. Hovering above, Luffy stands victorious.
734	106	"To Be Free! Dressrosa's Delight!"; Transliteration: "Jiyū e! Yorokobi no Doresurōza!" (Japanese: 自由へ！喜びのドレスローザ！)	Yoshihiro Ueda	Atsuhiro Tomioka	March 27, 2016	June 22, 2025
Everyone on Dressrosa rejoices at Doflamingo's defeat as the Birdcage disappears. As Luffy loses consciousness, the people remember their suffering at the hands of Doflamingo, and Kyros sheds human tears for the first time in ten years.
735	107	"The Unheard-of! Admiral Fujitora's Surprising Decision!"; Transliteration: "Zendai-mimon - Taishō Fujitora Shōgeki no Ketsudan!" (Japanese: 前代未聞 大将藤虎衝撃の決断！)	Kentarō Fujita	Tomohiro Nakayama	April 3, 2016	June 29, 2025
Sabo walks away from a defeated Burgess, but Burgess riles him up by talking about Ace, causing Sabo to severely burn him with Ace's Fire Fist technique. Meanwhile, the navy arrests the Donquixote Pirates except for Viola, Baby 5, and Bellamy. Maynard broadcasts the destruction on Dressrosa to three neighboring islands, and as this occurs, the people of Dressrosa beg Riku to return to the throne. Riku keeps refusing until Elizabello II backs up the citizens' plea, and Fujitora then arrives with a platoon of marines. As multitudes of people watch, Fujitora and the navy fall prostrate before Riku in apology for the World Government allowing Doflamingo to rule over Dressrosa. The record of this is kept, and soon news of Doflamingo's defeat at the hand of Luffy and Law's alliance is spread all over the world.
736	108	"Sending a Shock Wave! The Worst Generation Goes Into Action!"; Transliteration: "Gekishin Hashiru - Ugokidasu Saiaku no Sedai!" (Japanese: 激震走る 動き出す最悪の世代！)	Tetsuya Endō	Shōji Yonemura	April 10, 2016	July 20, 2025
As Fujitora bows in apology, King Riku asks him to raise his head, but the Admiral insists the world must witness his actions. He explains his refusal to stop Doflamingo earlier: he did not want the navy glorified as heroes, since they had enabled Doflamingo's reign. Instead, he entrusted the Straw Hats to end it, hoping they would succeed. To protect them from political backlash, Riku orders Tank to take the Straw Hats, their allies, and displaced civilians to the palace. Meanwhile, Kyros disbands the Tontatta army, and the Straw Hats reunite. In Mariejois, Sakazuki angrily confronts the Gorosei over Doflamingo's earlier deception, only to be shocked by news of his defeat. Across the world, underworld clients reliant on Doflamingo panic at losing their supply lines, while others curse Luffy and Law. The Supernovas react: Bonney reads the news, Kid's alliance is relieved their target remains Shanks, and Capone Bege orders his crew to secure Caesar for Big Mom. On a sky island, Urouge recovers when a mysterious man approaches. Elsewhere, X Drake reflects on his father's death at Doflamingo's hands, while his crew rush to warn Kaido that their vital Smile supply is gone. Back on Dressrosa, Fujitora openly broadcasts Doflamingo's defeat, sparking a heated argument with Sakazuki. Smoker, en route to Vegapunk with Tashigi and the Punk Hazard children, praises Fujitora's honesty, unlike the Crocodile incident. Sakazuki warns Fujitora can never set foot in a Marine base again unless he captures Luffy and Law, a condition Fujitora accepts.
737	109	"The Birth of the Legend! The Adventures of the Revolutionary Warrior Sabo!"; Transliteration: "Densetsu Tanjō - Kakumei Senshi Sabo no Bōken!" (Japanese: 伝説誕生 革命戦士サボの冒険！)	Katsumi Tokoro	Jin Tanaka	April 17, 2016	July 27, 2025
The Straw Hats, along with Law, Bellamy, Kin'emon, and Kanjuro, retreat to Kyros's house to rest. Soon after, Sabo arrives, shocking everyone except Robin with the revelation that he is Luffy and Ace's adoptive brother. He warns that CP-0 is hunting the Revolutionaries and urges the crew to leave Dressrosa quickly. At their request, Sabo recounts his past with Luffy and Ace and what became of him after being presumed dead. As a child in Goa Kingdom, Sabo felt suffocated by its corrupt nobility and disgusted when the Grey Terminal was burned. Attempting to escape by sea, his small ship crossed paths with the World Noble Jalmack, who blasted it with a bazooka. Gravely injured, Sabo was rescued by Dragon and treated aboard his ship. When he awoke, he had lost his memories, recalling only his name from his belongings. Though the Revolutionaries considered returning him to his family, Sabo instinctively refused, feeling unease towards where he came from despite his amnesia. He instead joins the Revolutionary Army, and although his memories were gone, his body retained combat skills that helped him rise quickly through the ranks. Meanwhile, repairs begin on the Dressrosa palace and the Colosseum fighters rest there. Bartolomeo warns the others of Cavendish's dangerous alter ego, locking him in chains to prevent trouble. After finishing his story, Franky asks how Sabo recovered his memories, to which Sabo solemnly explains that Ace's death triggered his memory.
738	110	"The Brothers' Bond! The Untold Story Behind Luffy and Sabo's Reunion!"; Transliteration: "Kyōdai no Kizuna - Rufi to Sabo Saikai Hiwa" (Japanese: 兄弟の絆 ルフィ・(と)サボ再会秘話)	Masahiro Hosoda	Jin Tanaka	April 24, 2016	August 3, 2025
Sabo tells Zoro, Robin, Franky, Kin'emon, and Kanjuro about how he regained his memories. Two years ago, Sabo and Koala returned to the Revolutionary Army's headquarters in Baltigo from a mission right after the Summit War of Marineford ended. While Dragon confirmed to his subordinates that Luffy was indeed his son, Sabo began sweating as he read the news report about Ace's death and begins crying and bending over in shock. He begins to remember his time with Ace and Luffy and their sworn brotherhood and begins convulsing. Sabo finally let out a large scream as he regained his memories and realized who Ace truly was, and collapsed in the process. Awaking three days later, Sabo revealed that he indeed regained his memories, and Koala asked if he would quit the Revolutionary Army. Sabo denied this, bu asked to speak with Dragon. Two years later, he visited Ace's grave and got permission to participate in the match for the Flame-Flame Fruit, where he reunited with Luffy. Sabo then gives a Vivre Card of Luffy to the Straw Hats, though keeps a piece for himself. He then leaves on a flock of birds, excited to get back to Baltigo and talk to Dragon about Luffy and happy that he got to meet Luffy. Meanwhile, Fujitora decides on a dice roll that he will not arrest the Straw Hats tonight, and at the palace, Riku tells Rebecca that when he becomes king she will be a princess.
739	111	"The Strongest Creature! One of the Four Emperors - Kaido, King of the Beasts!"; Transliteration: "Saikyō no Seibutsu - Yonkō: Hyakujū no Kaidō" (Japanese: 最強の生物 四皇・百獣のカイドウ)	Satoshi Itō	Atsuhiro Tomioka	May 1, 2016	August 10, 2025
Kyros awakens and shares a drink with Zoro, expressing gratitude to the Straw Hats for liberating Dressrosa. Meanwhile, aboard the Thousand Sunny, the Zou crew reaches a mysterious island. Sanji and Chopper force Caesar Clown to assist them while Nami, Brook, and Momonosuke face off against the pirates Sheepshead and Ginrummy. Suddenly, water bursts from a massive mountainous object, flooding the island. Nami rushes to rescue Brook and Momonosuke from drowning. The enemy duo soon reappears, riding a crocodile-like mount. Sheepshead attempts a sneak attack on Nami but is intercepted by Brook, who blocks his strike. In retaliation, Sheepshead reveals his Devil Fruit power, which transforms his arms into sheep horns. Despite the strength of this ability, Brook counters, freezing one of Sheepshead's horns. Sanji suddenly steps in, swiftly overwhelming Sheepshead with Diable Jambe. Defeated, Sheepshead's crew abandons their mission to capture the samurai and retreat. Elsewhere, a mysterious figure crashes onto the base of the Kid Pirates after leaping from the Sky Island where Urouge had been seen. A narration recounts his unbelievable history: defeated seven times, captured 18 times, and sentenced to execution 40 times, yet every execution attempt failed. He even sank nine prison ships, surviving countless ordeals as though death itself rejected him. From the crater he created from falling, the man rises and is revealed to be Kaido of the Beasts. Facing the stunned alliance of Kid, Hawkins, and Apoo, Kaido announces his intent to unleash a massive war upon the world.
740	112	"Fujitora Takes Action! The Complete Siege of the Straw Hats!"; Transliteration: "Fujitora Ugoku - Mugiwara no Ichimi Kanzen Hōimō" (Japanese: 藤虎動く 麦わらの一味完全包囲網)	Yoshihiro Ueda	Tomohiro Nakayama	May 8, 2016	August 17, 2025
Tsuru and Sengoku, who is now an Inspector General and has become more cheerful while also taken many of Garp's mannerisms, arrive on Dressrosa three days after the battle and meet up with Fujitora. Mansherry arrives at the Marine encampment, wanting to help heal the injured citizens. The navy is easily swayed by her and donate energy to create healing flowers. Meanwhile, the people of Dressrosa prepare to celebrate Riku Dold III's return to the throne and Rebecca becoming the crown princess. However, Kyros starts a rumor that she is the daughter of a faraway prince who died in a war, in order to prevent her from being associated with him and his checkered past. Tsuru rolls a six on Fujitora's die, allowing the navy to pursue the Straw Hats and their allies. Luffy wakes up after being asleep for three days and is unhappy about Kyros' decision. Suddenly Bartolomeo enters Kyros' house to reveal that the navy is coming for them. The pirates prepare to escape the island.
741	113	"A State of Emergency! Rebecca Is Kidnapped!"; Transliteration: "Hijō Jitai - Sarawa-reta Rebekka!" (Japanese: 非常事態 さらわれたレベッカ！)	Kentarō Fujita	Tomohiro Nakayama	May 15, 2016	August 24, 2025
The navy swarms Kyros' house, and the Straw Hats, Law, Bartolomeo, and Bellamy escape from it. However, Luffy departs from the group, saying he needed to do something. Marines occupy the entirety of Dressrosa, but the Corrida Colosseum gladiators take them out in order to clear the way for the Straw Hats. After fighting through hordes of marines, Luffy reaches the Royal Palace and speaks to Rebecca through the window, asking her if she is fine with Kyros' decision to exit her life. Rebecca confesses that she is not, and Luffy breaks her out of the palace, outraging both the navy and the Dressrosa citizens.
742	114	"The Bond Between Father and Daughter! Kyros and Rebecca!"; Transliteration: "Oyako no Kizuna - Kyurosu to Rebekka!" (Japanese: 父娘の絆 キュロスとレベッカ！)	Katsumi Tokoro	Shōji Yonemura	May 22, 2016	August 31, 2025
After evading the citizens as well as the navy armed with Sea Prism Stone nets. Luffy brings Rebecca to Kyros' house, where she confronts her father about abandoning her. Rebecca tells Kyros that she wants to be with him regardless of his past, and the two reconcile. At the Royal Palace, Viola approaches Riku Doldo III, revealing that Rebecca had asked her to become crown princess in her stead, much like Scarlett had done years ago. Meanwhile, Fujitora approaches the Straw Hats and the Colosseum gladiators as they wait for Luffy to return. At the Marine camp, Bastille receives reports that Marine troops all across the island have lost their weapons and their battleships have been stitched together. Unbeknownst to them, their weapons were stolen by the dwarves, and Leo had sewn their ships together, while those who donated energy to Mansherry become paralyzed. Law goes to talk to Sengoku about Donquixote Rosinante, with Sengoku talking about how he raised Rosinante as a son and Law revealing that he was the boy Rosinante died for.
743	115	"Men's Pride! Luffy vs. Fujitora, Head-to-Head!"; Transliteration: "Otoko no Iji - Rufi tai Fujitora Makkō Shōbu" (Japanese: 男の意地 ルフィVS(たい)藤虎真向勝負)	Directed by : Yasunori Koyama; Storyboarded by : Takashi Ōtsuka	Jin Tanaka	May 29, 2016	September 7, 2025
Law finishes talking with Sengoku, who refuses to discuss the D. in the former's name and says that Rosinante also had no idea and telling Law to not go looking for reasons for Rosinante's love for him before telling him the best way to honor Rosinante's memory is to keep living. At the eastern port, Fujitora lifts all the rubble on Dressrosa high into the air, intending to drop it on the pirates and gladiators. Suddenly, Luffy arrives and attacks Fujitora, not intending to run away from admirals anymore. As they battle, however, Luffy calls out what his next attack will be before performing it. Fujitora wonders why Luffy is announcing his attacks, questioning angrily if it were to give him a handicap because he's blind. Luffy replies that it is because he likes Fujitora, which causes the admiral to laugh, and his laughing angers Luffy as they exchange blows again. Eventually, Fujitora overpowers Luffy and sends him crashing into Dressrosa's coastline.
744	116	"No Way Out! Admiral Fujitora's Ruthless Pursuit!"; Transliteration: "Nigeba Nashi - Taishō Fujitora Hijō no Tsuigeki!" (Japanese: 逃場無し 大将藤虎非情の追撃！)	Tetsuya Endō	Atsuhiro Tomioka	June 5, 2016	September 14, 2025
Hajrudin carries Luffy as the Straw Hats, samurai, and Corrida Colosseum gladiators flee from Admiral Fujitora toward their ships. Fujitora prepares to crush them with levitating rubble, reflecting that even if they escape, they will still be hunted by the Four Emperors. He recalls Luffy's sympathy for his blindness but reveals he blinded himself, unwilling to see more of humanity's cruelty. Suddenly, Dressrosa's citizens charge after the supposed criminals, claiming they must stop Luffy for kidnapping Rebecca. Yet as they pass Fujitora, one asks why, since they all knew Rebecca was Kyros and Scarlett's daughter. Another admits they were aware of Kyros' true past and the fairies' identities. Their shouts are only for show as the crowd stops at the floating piers, smiling and cheering the Straw Hats to safety. Moved, Fujitora wonders what Luffy looks like, regretting his blindness. The crew is stunned upon reaching Orlumbus' enormous flagship, the Yonta Maria. Hajrudin announces that he and four other giants will reform the Giant Warrior Pirates, while Orlumbus offers his fleet of 56 ships. Leo pledges the Tonta Corps' support, while Ideo reveals his new alliance with Blue Gilly, Abdullah, and Jeet, and finally Suleiman declares loyalty to Cavendish. Overwhelmed, Luffy struggles to follow the flood of declarations, learning these groups had formed bonds while staying at the palace. Bartolomeo steps forward, requesting that all seven crews present be allowed to swear allegiance as a fleet under Luffy's leadership.
745	117	"Sons' Cups! The Straw Hat Fleet Is Formed!"; Transliteration: "Kobun no Sakazuki - Kessei! Mugiwara Dai Sendan!" (Japanese: 子分の盃 結成！麦わら大船団！)	Yoshihiro Ueda	Tomohiro Nakayama	June 12, 2016	September 21, 2025
Somewhere at sea, a group of pirates form an alliance to take revenge on Luffy for taking down Doflamingo's market, which they had relied on. They also plan to ransack Dressrosa if Riku has become king again. Luffy initially refuses his allies' request to serve under him, tell them that he does not want control over them because it would not let him sail freely and become Pirate King like he wanted to. Luffy tells the captains that they already had a bond after they worked together to defeat Doflamingo, and he would come help any of them if they came calling. Suddenly, they come under attack by the pirate alliance, but Fujitora destroys the alliance by dropping his rubble on their ships, saying its a parting gift for Luffy. In response to Luffy's reasoning Cavendish, Bartolomeo, Sai, Ideo, Leo, Hajrudin, and Orlumbus pledge their allegiance to him anyway, forming a one-sided alliance where they will help him whenever he needs. Fujitora thanks Luffy for cleaning up the World Government's messes, but is shocked when Sengoku overhears it from behind. On the Flower Field, Rebecca and Kyros watch the Straw Hats depart as they hold each other's bare hands for the first time in ten years. The newly formed Straw Hat Grand Fleet celebrates their formation as it is hinted that they will play a role in a pivotal event in the future.
746	118	"The Numerous Rivals Struggle Amongst Themselves! The Raging Monsters of the New World"; Transliteration: "Gun'yū-kakkyo - Arekurū Shin Sekai no Kaibutsu-tachi" (Japanese: 群雄割拠 荒狂う新世界の怪物達)	Masahiro Hosoda	Shōji Yonemura	June 19, 2016	September 28, 2025
Aboard the Yonta Maria, the Straw Hat Grand Fleet's party continues. Law stands apart, gazing at the sea. When Robin approaches to ask about his plans, he brushes her off. Meanwhile back in Dressrosa, CP-0 agents Rob Lucci and Spandam search for hidden weapons but find none as the kingdom celebrates a new era: dwarves are finally recognized and live openly with humans, and Leo oversees the construction of statues honoring Luffy, Kyros and Usopp. Meanwhile over on stormy seas, an imprisoned Doflamingo muses over who will ultimately reign supreme. Nearby, the pirate Jack readies his forces to ambush the Marine convoy transporting Doflamingo. Elsewhere on calmer waters, the Straw Hats are stunned when Bartolomeo reveals his ship, the Going Luffy. The vessel is covered in tributes: a giant Luffy statue as its masthead, a wall decorated with a replica of the Going Merry's head, a huge Chopper figure at the stern, and Nami-inspired tangerine groves. Franky praises the design, thrilling Bartolomeo and his crew. Bartolomeo's most prized possession is now a newly acquired vivre card that Sabo entrusted to Luffy. During the party on the Yonta Maria, Luffy had torn pieces of the card to share with Bellamy and each of the Grand Fleet captains as they departed. Now as they set course for Zou, Bartolomeo shows the Straw Hats their updated bounties, though Sanji is strangely only wanted alive. Elsewhere, a mysterious man consumes coal and his skin glows red with a strange power.

== Home media release ==
=== Japanese ===
Avex Pictures (Japan – Region 2/A)
Volume		Episodes	Release date	Ref.
17th Season Dressrosa-hen	piece.1	629–632	July 2, 2014	
17th Season Dressrosa-hen	piece.2	633–636	August 6, 2014	
17th Season Dressrosa-hen	piece.3	637–640	September 3, 2014	
17th Season Dressrosa-hen	piece.4	641–644	October 1, 2014	
17th Season Dressrosa-hen	piece.5	645–648	November 5, 2014	
17th Season Dressrosa-hen	piece.6	649–652	December 3, 2014	
17th Season Dressrosa-hen	piece.7	653–656	January 7, 2015	
17th Season Dressrosa-hen	piece.8	657–660	February 4, 2015	
17th Season Dressrosa-hen	piece.9	661–664	March 4, 2015	
17th Season Dressrosa-hen	piece.10	665–668	April 1, 2015	
17th Season Dressrosa-hen	piece.11	669–671	May 8, 2015	
17th Season Dressrosa-hen	piece.12	673–676	June 3, 2015	
17th Season Dressrosa-hen	piece.13	677–680	July 1, 2015	
17th Season Dressrosa-hen	piece.14	681–684	August 5, 2015	
17th Season Dressrosa-hen	piece.15	685–688	September 2, 2015	
17th Season Dressrosa-hen	piece.16	689–692	October 27, 2015	
17th Season Dressrosa-hen	piece.17	693–696	November 4, 2015	
17th Season Dressrosa-hen	piece.18	697–700	December 4, 2015	
17th Season Dressrosa-hen	piece.19	701–704	January 6, 2016	
17th Season Dressrosa-hen	piece.20	705–708	February 3, 2016	
17th Season Dressrosa-hen	piece.21	709–712	March 2, 2016	
17th Season Dressrosa-hen	piece.22	713–716	April 6, 2016	
17th Season Dressrosa-hen	piece.23	717–720	May 11, 2016	
17th Season Dressrosa-hen	piece.24	721–724	June 1, 2016	
17th Season Dressrosa-hen	piece.25	725–728	July 6, 2016	
17th Season Dressrosa-hen	piece.26	729–732	August 3, 2016	
17th Season Dressrosa-hen	piece.27	733–736	September 7, 2016	
17th Season Dressrosa-hen	piece.28	737–740	October 5, 2016	
17th Season Dressrosa-hen	piece.29	741–743	November 2, 2016	
17th Season Dressrosa-hen	piece.30	744–746	December 7, 2016	
One Piece Log Collection	"Dressrosa"	629–644	July 28, 2017	
One Piece Log Collection	"Colosseum"	645–661	August 25, 2017	
One Piece Log Collection	"SOP"	662–678	December 22, 2017	
One Piece Log Collection	"Sabo"	679–695	January 26, 2018	
One Piece Log Collection	"Corazon"	696–708	July 27, 2018	
One Piece Log Collection	"Birdcage"	709–720	July 27, 2018	
One Piece Log Collection	"Doflamingo"	721–733	August 24, 2018	
One Piece Log Collection	"Fujitora"	734–746	September 28, 2018	

=== English ===
In North America, the season was recategorized as part of "Season Eleven" for its home video release by Funimation Entertainment. Starting with this season, Funimation's releases bundle DVD and Blu-ray copies of the series.

Funimation Entertainment (North America – Region 1/A); Madman Entertainment (Australia and New Zealand – Region 4/B)
Volume		Episodes	Release date			ISBN	Ref.
Volume		Episodes	NA	UK & IE	AUS & NZ	ISBN	Ref.
Season Eleven	Voyage One	629–641	March 23, 2021	N/A	December 7, 2022	ISBN N/A	
Season Eleven	Voyage Two	642–654	May 11, 2021	N/A	December 7, 2022	ISBN N/A	
Season Eleven	Voyage Three	655–667	July 6, 2021	N/A	June 7, 2023	ISBN N/A	
Season Eleven	Voyage Four	668–680	September 7, 2021	N/A	July 5, 2023	ISBN N/A	
Season Eleven	Voyage Five	681–693	November 9, 2021	N/A	August 9, 2023	ISBN N/A	
Season Eleven	Voyage Six	694–706	January 4, 2022	N/A	September 6, 2023	ISBN N/A	
Season Eleven	Voyage Seven	707–719	March 29, 2022	N/A	September 6, 2023	ISBN N/A	
Season Eleven	Voyage Eight	720–732	June 7, 2022	N/A	October 4, 2023	ISBN N/A	
Season Eleven	Voyage Nine	733–746	July 5, 2022	N/A	November 8, 2023	ISBN N/A	
Collection	26	615–641 (Note: Collection 26 contains 27 episodes on DVD, but only the last 13 episodes are included on the bundled Blu-rays. This matches the formats previously used for the "Season Ten" and "Season Eleven" releases of the same episodes.)	June 15, 2021	May 16, 2022	N/A	ISBN N/A	
Collection	27	642–667	August 10, 2021	June 27, 2022	N/A	ISBN N/A	
Collection	28	668–693	December 14, 2021	August 15, 2022	N/A	ISBN N/A	
Collection	29	694–719	April 12, 2022	September 26, 2022	N/A	ISBN N/A	
Collection	30	720–746	August 2, 2022	January 30, 2023	N/A	ISBN N/A	
