= List of One Piece episodes (seasons 15–19) =

Episodes 517 to 891 of One Piece

One Piece is an anime television series based on Eiichiro Oda's manga series of the same name. Produced by Toei Animation, and directed by Konosuke Uda, Munehisa Sakai, and Hiroaki Miyamoto, it began broadcasting on Fuji Television on October 20, 1999. One Piece follows the adventures of Monkey D. Luffy, a 17-year-old young man, whose body has gained the properties of rubber from accidentally eating a supernatural fruit, and his crew of diverse pirates, named the Straw Hat Pirates. Luffy's greatest ambition is to obtain the ultimate treasure in the world, One Piece, and thereby become the next King of the Pirates. The series uses 50 pieces of theme music: 28 opening themes and 22 closing themes. Several CDs that contain the theme music and other tracks have been released by Toei Animation. The first DVD compilation was released on February 21, 2001, with individual volumes releasing monthly. The Singaporean company Odex released part of the series locally in English and Japanese in the form of dual audio Video CDs.

The first unedited, bilingual DVD box set, containing 13 episodes, was released on May 27, 2008. Similarly sized sets followed with 31 sets released as of July 2015. Episodes began streaming on August 29, 2009.

== Series overview ==
Season	Main arc title(s)	Episodes	Originally released	
Season	Main arc title(s)	Episodes	First released	Last released
1	East Blue	61	October 20, 1999	March 7, 2001
2	Entering into the Grand Line	16	March 21, 2001	August 19, 2001
3	Introducing Chopper at Drum Kingdom	15	August 26, 2001	December 9, 2001
4	Alabasta	38	December 16, 2001	October 27, 2002
5	TV Original	13	November 3, 2002	February 2, 2003
6	Skypiea	52	February 9, 2003	June 13, 2004
7	Escape! The Naval Fortress & The Foxy Pirate Crew	33	June 20, 2004	March 27, 2005
8	Water Seven	35	April 17, 2005	April 30, 2006
9	Enies Lobby	73	May 21, 2006	December 23, 2007
10	Thriller Bark	45	January 6, 2008	December 14, 2008
11	Sabaody Archipelago	26	December 21, 2008	June 28, 2009
12	Amazon Lily	14	July 5, 2009	October 11, 2009
13	Impel Down	35	October 18, 2009	June 20, 2010
14	Marineford	60	June 27, 2010	September 25, 2011
15	Fish-Man Island	62	October 2, 2011	December 23, 2012
16	Punk Hazard	50	January 6, 2013	January 12, 2014
17	Dressrosa	118	January 19, 2014	June 19, 2016
18	Zou	36	June 26, 2016	April 2, 2017
19	Whole Cake Island	109	April 9, 2017	June 30, 2019
20	Wano Country	197	July 7, 2019	December 17, 2023
21	Egghead	67	January 7, 2024	December 28, 2025
22	Elbaph	21	April 5, 2026	TBA

== Episodes ==
=== Season 15: Fishman Island (2011–12) ===
No. overall	No. in season	Title	Directed by	Written by	Original release date	English air date
Return to Sabaody
517	1	"The Beginning of the New Chapter! The Straw Hats Reunited!"; Transliteration: "Shinshō Kaimaku - Saishūketsu! Mugiwara no Ichimi" (Japanese: 新章開幕 再集結！麦わらの一味)	Hiroaki Miyamoto	Hirohiko Kamisaka	October 2, 2011	January 23, 2022
518	2	"An Explosive Situation! Luffy vs. Fake Luffy!"; Transliteration: "Isshoku Sokuhatsu! Rufi tai Nise Rufi" (Japanese: 一触即発！ルフィVS(たい)ニセルフィ)	Naoyuki Itō	Yoshiyuki Suga	October 9, 2011	January 23, 2022
519	3	"The Navy Has Set Out! The Straw Hats in Danger!"; Transliteration: "Kaigun Shutsudō - Nerawareta Mugiwara no Ichimi" (Japanese: 海軍出動 狙われた麦わらの一味)	Yutaka Nakashima	Tomohiro Nakayama	October 16, 2011	January 30, 2022
520	4	"Big Guns Assembled! The Danger of the Fake Straw Hats!"; Transliteration: "Ōmono Shūketsu - Nise Mugiwara Ichimi no Kyōi" (Japanese: 大物集結 ニセ麦わら一味の脅威)	Gō Koga	Jin Tanaka	October 23, 2011	January 30, 2022
521	5	"The Battle Is On! Show Them What You Got from Training!"; Transliteration: "Sentō Kaishi! Misero Shugyō no Seika!" (Japanese: 戦闘開始！見せろ修行の成果！)	Takashi Ōtsuka	Hirohiko Kamisaka	October 30, 2011	February 6, 2022
522	6	"Everyone Together! Luffy, Setting Out for the New World!"; Transliteration: "Zen'in Shūgō - Rufi Shin Sekai e no Funade" (Japanese: 全員集合 ルフィ新世界への船出)	Hiroyuki Satō	Jin Tanaka	November 6, 2011	February 6, 2022
Fish-Man Island
523	7	"A Surprising Fact! The Man Who Guarded the Sunny!"; Transliteration: "Kyōgaku no Shinjitsu - Sanī-gō o Mamotta Otoko" (Japanese: 驚愕の真実 サニー号を守った男)	Yoshihiro Ueda	Yoshiyuki Suga	November 13, 2011	February 13, 2022
524	8	"Deadly Combat Under the Sea! The Demon of the Ocean Strikes!"; Transliteration: "Kaichū no Shitō - Arawareta Ōunabara no Akuma" (Japanese: 海中の死闘 現れた大海原の悪魔)	Aya Komaki	Tomohiro Nakayama	November 20, 2011	February 13, 2022
525	9	"Lost in the Deep Sea! The Straw Hats Get Separated!"; Transliteration: "Shinkai de Sōnan - Hagureta Mugiwara no Ichimi" (Japanese: 深海で遭難 逸れた麦わらの一味)	Katsumi Tokoro	Tomohiro Nakayama	November 27, 2011	February 20, 2022
526	10	"Undersea Volcanic Eruption! Drifting to the Fishman Island!"; Transliteration: "Kaitei Kazan Funka! Nagasarete Gyojin-tō" (Japanese: 海底火山噴火！流されて魚人島)	Takahiro Imamura	Yoshiyuki Suga	December 4, 2011	February 20, 2022
527	11	"Landing at the Fishman Island! Beautiful Mermaids!"; Transliteration: "Gyojin-tō Jōriku - Uruwashiki Ningyo-tachi" (Japanese: 魚人島上陸 うるわしき人魚たち)	Yutaka Nakashima	Hirohiko Kamisaka	December 11, 2011	February 27, 2022
528	12	"Excitement Blow-out! Sanji's Life Under Threat!"; Transliteration: "Kōfun Bakuhatsu! Sanji Seimei no Kiki!" (Japanese: 興奮爆発！サンジ生命の危機！)	Naoyuki Itō	Jin Tanaka	December 18, 2011	February 27, 2022
529	13	"The Fishman Island Will Be Annihilated?! Sharley's Prophecy!"; Transliteration: "Gyojin-tō Metsubō!? Shārī no Yogen" (Japanese: 魚人島滅亡!? シャーリーの予言)	Yoshihiro Ueda	Hirohiko Kamisaka	December 25, 2011	March 6, 2022
530	14	"The King of the Fishman Island! Neptune, the God of the Sea!"; Transliteration: "Gyojin-tō no Ō - Kaishin Nepuchūn!" (Japanese: 魚人島の王 海神ネプチューン！)	Directed by : Ayako Hiraike; Storyboarded by : Hiroaki Miyamoto	Yoshiyuki Suga	January 8, 2012	March 6, 2022
531	15	"The Ryugu Palace! Taken by the Shark That They Saved!"; Transliteration: "Ryūgū-jō! Tasuketa Same ni Tsurerarete" (Japanese: 竜宮城！助けた鮫に連れられて)	Gō Koga	Jin Tanaka	January 15, 2012	March 13, 2022
532	16	"A Coward and a Crybaby! The Princess in the Hard Shell Tower!"; Transliteration: "Yowamushi de Nakimushi! Kōkaku-tō no Ningyo Hime" (Japanese: 弱虫で泣き虫！硬殻塔の人魚姫)	Aya Komaki	Tomohiro Nakayama	January 22, 2012	March 13, 2022
533	17	"It's an Emergency! The Ryugu Palace Is Occupied!"; Transliteration: "Kinkyū Jitai Hassei - Senkyo Sareta Ryūgū-jō" (Japanese: 緊急事態発生 占拠された竜宮城)	Directed by : Hiroyuki Satō; Storyboarded by : Tetsuya Endō	Hirohiko Kamisaka	January 29, 2012	March 20, 2022
534	18	"The Ryugu Palace in Shock! The Kidnapping of Shirahoshi!"; Transliteration: "Ryūgū-jō Gekishin! Shirahoshi Yūkai Jiken" (Japanese: 竜宮城激震！しらほし誘拐事件)	Takahiro Imamura	Yoshiyuki Suga	February 5, 2012	March 20, 2022
535	19	"Hordy's Onslaught! The Retaliatory Plan Set into Motion!"; Transliteration: "Hōdi Shūrai - Fukushū Keikaku no Hajimari" (Japanese: ホーディ襲来 復讐計画の始まり)	Katsumi Tokoro	Tomohiro Nakayama	February 12, 2012	March 27, 2022
536	20	"The Battle in the Ryugu Palace! Zoro vs. Hordy!"; Transliteration: "Ryūgū-jō no Kessen! Zoro tai Hōdi" (Japanese: 竜宮城の決戦！ゾロVS(たい)ホーディ)	Yoshihiro Ueda	Jin Tanaka	February 19, 2012	March 27, 2022
537	21	"Keep Shirahoshi Safe! Decken Close Behind!"; Transliteration: "Shirahoshi o Mamore - Dekken no Tsuigeki" (Japanese: しらほしを守れ デッケンの追撃)	Yutaka Nakashima	Yoshiyuki Suga	February 26, 2012	April 3, 2022
538	22	"The Straw Hats Defeated?! Hordy Gains Control of the Ryugu Palace!"; Transliteration: "Ichimi Haiboku!? Hōdi Ryūgū-jō Seiatsu" (Japanese: 一味敗北!? ホーディ竜宮城制圧)	Naoyuki Itō	Hirohiko Kamisaka	March 4, 2012	April 3, 2022
539	23	"The Haunting Ties! Nami and the Fishman Pirates!"; Transliteration: "Yomigaeru In'nen! Nami to Gyojin Kaizoku-dan!" (Japanese: 蘇る因縁！ナミと魚人海賊団！)	Aya Komaki	Tomohiro Nakayama	March 18, 2012	April 10, 2022
540	24	"A Hero Who Freed the Slaves! An Adventurer Tiger!"; Transliteration: "Dorei Kaihō no Eiyū - Bōkenka Taigā" (Japanese: 奴隷解放の英雄 冒険家タイガー)	Directed by : Hiroyuki Satō; Storyboarded by : Hiroyuki Satō & Yoshihiro Ueda	Jin Tanaka	March 25, 2012	April 17, 2022
541	25	"Kizaru Appears! A Trap to Catch Tiger!"; Transliteration: "Kizaru Tōjō! Taigā o Nerau Wana!" (Japanese: 黄猿登場！タイガーを狙う罠！)	Yoshihiro Ueda	Tomohiro Nakayama	April 1, 2012	April 17, 2022
Toriko x One Piece Collaboration Special
542	26	"A Team Is Formed! Save Chopper"; Transliteration: "Chīmu Kessei! Choppā o Sukue" (Japanese: チーム結成！チョッパーを救え)	Tetsuya Endō & Yutaka Nakashima	Isao Murayama	April 8, 2012 (Note: This episode originally aired as second half of a one hour TV special alongside Toriko. In North America, it was skipped during Funimation's simulcast and subsequently released by Crunchyroll on October 18, 2014.)	N/A
Fish-Man Island
543	27	"The Death of the Hero! A Shocking Truth of Tiger!"; Transliteration: "Eiyū no Saigo - Taigā Shōgeki no Shinjitsu" (Japanese: 英雄の最期 タイガー衝撃の真実)	Directed by : Yoshihiro Ueda; Storyboarded by : Katsumi Tokoro	Yoshiyuki Suga	April 15, 2012	April 24, 2022
544	28	"The Sun Pirates Split! Jimbei vs. Arlong!"; Transliteration: "Kaizokudan Bunretsu - Jinbē tai Āron" (Japanese: 海賊団分裂 ジンベエVS(たい)アーロン)	Takahiro Imamura	Jin Tanaka	April 22, 2012	April 24, 2022
545	29	"Shaking Fishman Island! A Celestial Dragon Drifts In!"; Transliteration: "Yureru Gyojin-tō! Hyōchakushita Tenryūbito" (Japanese: 揺れる魚人島！漂着した天竜人)	Naoyuki Itō	Yoshiyuki Suga	April 29, 2012	May 1, 2022
546	30	"A Sudden Tragedy! A Gunshot Shuts Down the Future!"; Transliteration: "Totsuzen no Higeki! Mirai o Tozasu Kyōdan" (Japanese: 突然の悲劇！未来を閉ざす凶弾)	Aya Komaki	Tomohiro Nakayama	May 6, 2012	May 1, 2022
547	31	"Back to the Present! Hordy Makes a Move!"; Transliteration: "Futatabi Genzai e! Ugokidasu Hōdi" (Japanese: 再び現在へ！動き出すホーディ)	Directed by : Tetsuya Endō; Storyboarded by : Hiroaki Miyamoto	Hirohiko Kamisaka	May 13, 2012	May 8, 2022
548	32	"The Kingdom in Shock! An Order to Execute Neptune Issued!"; Transliteration: "Ōkoku Gekishin - Nepuchūn Shokei Shirei" (Japanese: 王国激震 ネプチューン処刑指令)	Yoshihiro Ueda	Jin Tanaka	May 20, 2012	May 8, 2022
549	33	"A Rift Opens Up! Luffy vs. Jimbei!"; Transliteration: "Shōjita Kiretsu! Rufi tai Jinbē" (Japanese: 生じた亀裂！ルフィVS(たい)ジンベエ)	Yutaka Nakashima	Tomohiro Nakayama	May 27, 2012	May 15, 2022
550	34	"Something Has Happened to Hordy! The True Power of the Evil Drug!"; Transliteration: "Hōdi no Ihen - Kyōyaku no Shin no Chikara!" (Japanese: ホーディの異変 凶薬の真の力！)	Gō Koga	Hirohiko Kamisaka	June 3, 2012	May 15, 2022
551	35	"The Battle Is On! At Conchcorde Plaza!"; Transliteration: "Kessen Hajimaru - Gyonkorudo Hiroba!" (Japanese: 決戦始まる ギョンコルド広場！)	Tetsuya Endō	Jin Tanaka	June 10, 2012	May 22, 2022
552	36	"A Surprising Confession! The Truth Behind the Assassination of Otohime!"; Transliteration: "Shōgeki no Kokuhaku - Otohime Ansatsu no Shinjitsu" (Japanese: 衝撃の告白 オトヒメ暗殺の真実)	Aya Komaki	Yoshiyuki Suga	June 17, 2012	May 22, 2022
553	37	"Shirahoshi's Tears! Luffy Finally Shows Up!"; Transliteration: "Shirahoshi no Namida! Rufi Tsuini Tōjō" (Japanese: しらほしの涙！ルフィ遂に登場)	Hiroaki Miyamoto	Hirohiko Kamisaka	June 24, 2012	May 29, 2022
554	38	"A Big Clash! The Straw Hats vs. a Hundred Thousand Enemies!"; Transliteration: "Dai Gekitotsu! Mugiwara Ichimi tai Jū-man no Teki" (Japanese: 大激突！麦わら一味VS(たい)10(じゅう)万の敵)	Yoshihiro Ueda	Yoshiyuki Suga	July 1, 2012	May 29, 2022
555	39	"Deadly Attacks One After Another! Zoro and Sanji Join the Battle!"; Transliteration: "Ōwaza Sakuretsu! Zoro to Sanji Shutsugeki!" (Japanese: 大技炸裂！ゾロ・(と)サンジ出撃！)	Takahiro Imamura	Tomohiro Nakayama	July 8, 2012	June 5, 2022
556	40	"Unveiled! The Secret Weapons of the Sunny!"; Transliteration: "Hatsu Hirō! Sanī-gō no Himitsu Heiki!" (Japanese: 初披露！サニー号の秘密兵器！)	Naoyuki Itō	Jin Tanaka	July 15, 2012	June 5, 2022
557	41	"Iron Pirate! Here Comes General Franky!"; Transliteration: "Aian Pairētsu! Furankī Shōgun Tōjō" (Japanese: 鉄の海賊(アイアンパイレーツ)！フランキー将軍登場)	Yutaka Nakashima	Hirohiko Kamisaka	July 29, 2012	June 12, 2022
558	42	"The Noah Closing In! The Fishman Island Facing Destruction!"; Transliteration: "Noa Sekkin! Gyojin-tō Kaimetsu no Kiki!" (Japanese: ノア接近！魚人島壊滅の危機！)	Tetsuya Endō	Tomohiro Nakayama	August 5, 2012	June 12, 2022
559	43	"Hurry Up, Luffy! Shirahoshi's Life in Jeopardy!"; Transliteration: "Isoge Rufi! Shirahoshi Zettai Zetsumei" (Japanese: 急げルフィ！しらほし絶体絶命)	Gō Koga	Yoshiyuki Suga	August 12, 2012	June 19, 2022
560	44	"The Fierce Fight Begins! Luffy vs. Hordy!"; Transliteration: "Gekitō Kaishi! Rufi tai Hōdi!" (Japanese: 激闘開始！ルフィVS(たい)ホーディ！)	Yoshihiro Ueda	Jin Tanaka	August 19, 2012	June 19, 2022
561	45	"A Massive Confused Fight! The Straw Hats vs. the New Fishman Pirates!"; Transliteration: "Dai-ransen! Ichimi tai Shin Gyojin Kaizokudan!" (Japanese: 大乱戦！一味VS(たい)新魚人海賊団！)	Aya Komaki	Tomohiro Nakayama	August 26, 2012	June 26, 2022
562	46	"Luffy Loses the Fight?! Hordy's Long-Awaited Revenge!"; Transliteration: "Rufi Haiboku!? Hōdi Fukushū no Toki" (Japanese: ルフィ敗北!? ホーディ復讐の時)	Directed by : Takahiro Imamura; Storyboarded by : Naotoshi Shida	Yoshiyuki Suga	September 2, 2012	June 26, 2022
563	47	"A Shocking Fact! The True Identity of Hordy!"; Transliteration: "Shōgeki no Jijitsu! Hōdi no Shōtai!" (Japanese: 衝撃の事実！ホーディの正体！)	Naoyuki Itō	Jin Tanaka	September 9, 2012	July 10, 2022
564	48	"Back to Zero! Earnest Wishes for Luffy!"; Transliteration: "Zero ni! Rufi e no Atsuki Negai!" (Japanese: ゼロに！ルフィへの熱き願い！)	Tetsuya Endō	Hirohiko Kamisaka	September 16, 2012	July 10, 2022
565	49	"Luffy's All-Out Attack! Red Hawk Blasts!"; Transliteration: "Rufi Konshin no Ichigeki! Reddo Hōku Sakuretsu" (Japanese: ルフィ渾身の一撃！火拳銃(レッドホーク)炸裂)	Yutaka Nakashima	Hirohiko Kamisaka	September 23, 2012	July 17, 2022
566	50	"Coming to an End! The Final Decisive Battle Against Hordy!"; Transliteration: "Tsui ni Ketchaku! Hōdi Saishū Kessen" (Japanese: ついに決着！ホーディ最終決戦)	Hiroaki Miyamoto	Yoshiyuki Suga	September 30, 2012	July 17, 2022
567	51	"Stop, Noah! Desperate Elephant Gatling!"; Transliteration: "Tomare Noa! Kesshi no Erefanto Gatoringu!" (Japanese: 止まれノア！決死の象銃乱打(エレファントガトリング)！)	Takahiro Imamura	Jin Tanaka	October 7, 2012	July 24, 2022
568	52	"To the Future! The Path to the Sun!"; Transliteration: "Mirai e! Taiyō e to Tsuzuku Michi!" (Japanese: 未来へ！タイヨウへと続く道！)	Aya Komaki	Tomohiro Nakayama	October 14, 2012	July 24, 2022
569	53	"The Secret Revealed! The Truth About the Ancient Weapon!"; Transliteration: "Akasareta Himitsu - Kodai Heiki no Shinjitsu" (Japanese: 明かされた秘密 古代兵器の真実)	Yoshihiro Ueda	Tomohiro Nakayama	October 21, 2012	July 31, 2022
570	54	"The Straw Hats Stunned! The New Fleet Admiral of the Navy!"; Transliteration: "Ichimi Kyōgaku! Aratanaru Kaigun Gensui!" (Japanese: 一味驚愕！新たなる海軍元帥！)	Directed by : Tetsuya Endō; Storyboarded by : Gō Koga	Jin Tanaka	October 28, 2012	July 31, 2022
571	55	"She Loves Sweets! Big Mom of the Four Emperors!"; Transliteration: "Okashi-zuki! Yonkō Biggu Mamu" (Japanese: お菓子好き！四皇ビッグ・マム)	Tetsuya Endō	Yoshiyuki Suga	November 4, 2012	August 7, 2022
572	56	"Many Problems Lie Ahead! A Trap Awaiting in the New World!"; Transliteration: "Zento Tanan - Shin Sekai ni Machiukeru Wana" (Japanese: 前途多難 新世界に待ち受ける罠)	Directed by : Ayako Hiraike; Storyboarded by : Naoyuki Itō	Tomohiro Nakayama	November 11, 2012	August 7, 2022
573	57	"Finally Time to Go! Goodbye, Fishman Island!"; Transliteration: "Tsui ni Shukkō! Sayonara Gyojin-tō" (Japanese: ついに出航！さよなら魚人島)	Yutaka Nakashima	Jin Tanaka	November 18, 2012	August 14, 2022
574	58	"To the New World! Heading for the Ultimate Sea!"; Transliteration: "Shin Sekai e! Saikyō no Umi o Mezashite" (Japanese: 新世界へ！最強の海をめざして)	Directed by : Katsumi Tokoro; Storyboarded by : Naotoshi Shida	Yoshiyuki Suga	November 25, 2012	August 14, 2022
Z's Ambition
575	59	"Z's Ambition! Lily the Little Giant!"; Transliteration: "Zetto no Yabō-hen - Chiisana Kyojin Rirī!" (Japanese: Z(ゼット)の野望編 小さな巨人リリー！)	Aya Komaki	Hirohiko Kamisaka	December 2, 2012	August 21, 2022
576	60	"Z's Ambition! A Dark and Powerful Army!"; Transliteration: "Zetto no Yabō-hen - Nazo no Saikyō Gundan Tōjō!" (Japanese: Z(ゼット)の野望編 謎の最強軍団登場！)	Yoshihiro Ueda	Hirohiko Kamisaka	December 9, 2012	August 21, 2022
577	61	"Z's Ambition! A Great and Desperate Escape Plan!"; Transliteration: "Zetto no Yabō-hen - Kesshi no Dai Dasshutsu Sakusen!" (Japanese: Z(ゼット)の野望編 決死の大脱出作戦！)	Takahiro Imamura	Hirohiko Kamisaka	December 16, 2012	August 28, 2022
578	62	"Z's Ambition! Luffy vs. Shuzo!"; Transliteration: "Zetto no Yabō-hen - Rufi tai Shūzo!" (Japanese: Z(ゼット)の野望編 ルフィVS(たい)シューゾ！)	Tetsuya Endō	Hirohiko Kamisaka	December 23, 2012	August 28, 2022

=== Season 16: Punk Hazard (2013–14) ===
No. overall (Note: Episode number by Toei Animation's count)	No. in season	Title (Note: Title of the episode: literally translated, romanized using Hepburn romanization, and in kanji form)	Directed by	Written by	Original release date (Note: Date the episode originally aired on Fuji Television)	English air date
Punk Hazard
579	1	"Arriving! A Burning Island - Punk Hazard!"; Transliteration: "Jōriku! Moeru Shima Panku Hazādo" (Japanese: 上陸！燃える島パンクハザード)	Directed by : Ayako Hiraike; Storyboarded by : Naoyuki Itō	Tomohiro Nakayama	January 6, 2013	September 4, 2022
580	2	"A Battle in the Heat! Luffy vs. the Giant Dragon!"; Transliteration: "Shakunetsu no Tatakai! Rufi tai Kyodai Ryū!" (Japanese: 灼熱の戦い！ルフィVS(たい)巨大竜！)	Yutaka Nakashima	Jin Tanaka	January 13, 2013	September 4, 2022
581	3	"The Straw Hats Stunned! Enter: A Samurai's Horrifying Severed Head!"; Transliteration: "Ichimi Sōzen! Shōgeki no Kubi dake Samurai Tōjō!" (Japanese: 一味騒然！衝撃の首だけ侍登場！)	Hiroaki Miyamoto	Yoshiyuki Suga	January 20, 2013	September 11, 2022
582	4	"Startling! The Secret of the Island Is Finally Revealed!"; Transliteration: "Kyōgaku! Tsui ni Akasareru Shima no Himitsu" (Japanese: 驚愕！遂に明かされる島の秘密)	Yoshihiro Ueda	Tomohiro Nakayama	January 27, 2013	September 11, 2022
583	5	"Save the Children! The Straw Hats Start to Fight!"; Transliteration: "Kodomo-tachi o Sukue! Ichimi Sentō Kaishi" (Japanese: 子供達を救え！一味戦闘開始)	Aya Komaki	Yoshiyuki Suga	February 3, 2013	September 25, 2022
584	6	"A Swordplay Showdown! Brook vs. the Mysterious Torso Samurai!"; Transliteration: "Kenjutsu Shōbu - Burukku tai Nazo no Dōtai Samurai" (Japanese: 剣術勝負 ブルックVS(たい)謎の胴体侍)	Directed by : Tetsuya Endō; Storyboarded by : Kenji Yokoyama	Jin Tanaka	February 10, 2013	September 25, 2022
585	7	"The Warlord! Trafalgar Law!"; Transliteration: "Shichibukai! Torafarugā Rō" (Japanese: 七武海！トラファルガー・ロー)	Directed by : Takahiro Imamura; Storyboarded by : Naotoshi Shida	Tomohiro Nakayama	February 17, 2013	October 2, 2022
586	8	"In a Real Pinch! Luffy Sinks into the Ice-cold Lake!"; Transliteration: "Dai Pinchi - Rufi Gokkan no Mizuumi ni Shizumu" (Japanese: 大ピンチ ルフィ極寒の湖に沈む)	Katsumi Tokoro	Jin Tanaka	March 3, 2013	October 2, 2022
587	9	"A Collision! Law vs. Vice Admiral Smoker!"; Transliteration: "Gekitotsu! Rō tai Sumōkā Chūjō" (Japanese: 激突！ローVS(たい)スモーカー中将)	Naoyuki Itō	Yoshiyuki Suga	March 17, 2013	October 9, 2022
588	10	"Meeting Again After Two Years! Luffy and Law!"; Transliteration: "Ni-nen Buri no Saikai! Rufi to Rō" (Japanese: 2(に)年ぶりの再会！ルフィとロー)	Yoshihiro Ueda	Tomohiro Nakayama	March 24, 2013	October 9, 2022
589	11	"The Worst in the World! A Scientist of Terror - Caesar!"; Transliteration: "Sekai Saiaku - Kyōfu no Kagakusha Shīzā" (Japanese: 世界最悪 恐怖の科学者シーザー)	Tetsuya Endō	Hirohiko Kamisaka	March 31, 2013	October 16, 2022
Toriko x One Piece x Dragon Ball Z Collaboration Special
590	12	"History's Strongest Collaboration vs. Glutton of the Sea!"; Transliteration: "Shijō Saikyō Korabo tai Umi no Taishokukan" (Japanese: 史上最強コラボVS(たい)海の大食漢)	Directed by : Yutaka Nakashima; Storyboarded by : Naotoshi Shida	Isao Murayama	April 7, 2013 (Note: This episode originally aired as second half of a one-hour TV special alongside Toriko.)	March 5, 2023
Punk Hazard
591	13	"Chopper's Fury! The Master's Inhumane Experiment!"; Transliteration: "Choppā Gekido - Masutā Hidōnaru Jikken" (Japanese: チョッパー激怒 M(マスター)非道なる実験)	Aya Komaki	Yoshiyuki Suga	April 14, 2013	October 16, 2022
592	14	"To Annihilate the Straw Hats! Legendary Assassins Descend!"; Transliteration: "Ichimi Massatsu! Densetsu no Koroshiya Raishū!" (Japanese: 一味抹殺！伝説の殺し屋来襲！)	Directed by : Takahiro Imamura; Storyboarded by : Keiji Gotoh	Jin Tanaka	April 21, 2013	October 23, 2022
593	15	"Save Nami! Luffy's Fight on the Snow-Capped Mountains!"; Transliteration: "Nami o Sukue! Rufi Yukiyama no Tatakai" (Japanese: ナミを救え！ルフィ雪山の戦い)	Yoshihiro Ueda	Jin Tanaka	April 28, 2013	October 23, 2022
594	16	"Formed! Luffy and Law's Pirate Alliance!"; Transliteration: "Kessei! Rufi to Rō Kaizoku Dōmei!" (Japanese: 結成！ルフィ・(と)ロー海賊同盟！)	Directed by : Ayako Hiraike; Storyboarded by : Kenji Yokoyama	Tomohiro Nakayama	May 5, 2013	November 6, 2022
595	17	"Capture M! The Pirate Alliance's Operation Launches!"; Transliteration: "Masutā o Toraero - Kaizoku Dōmei Sakusen Kaishi!" (Japanese: M(マスター)を捉えろ 海賊同盟作戦開始！)	Tetsuya Endō	Yoshiyuki Suga	May 12, 2013	November 13, 2022
596	18	"On the Verge of Annihilation! A Deadly Monster Comes Flying In!"; Transliteration: "Zenmetsu no Kiki - Shi no Monsutā Hirai" (Japanese: 全滅の危機 死のモンスター飛来)	Directed by : Takahiro Imamura; Storyboarded by : Kōhei Kureta	Shōji Yonemura	May 19, 2013	November 20, 2022
597	19	"An Intense Battle! Caesar Exercises His True Power!"; Transliteration: "Dai-Gekisen - Shīzā Shin no Nōryoku Hatsudō!" (Japanese: 大激戦 シーザー真の能力発動！)	Aya Komaki	Yoshiyuki Suga	May 26, 2013	December 4, 2022
598	20	"A Samurai Who Can Cut Fire! Foxfire Kin'emon!"; Transliteration: "Honoo Kirisaku Samurai! Kitsunebi no Kin'emon" (Japanese: 炎切り裂く侍！狐火の錦えもん)	Directed by : Tetsuya Endō; Storyboarded by : Nobutaka Nishizawa	Tomohiro Nakayama	June 2, 2013	December 11, 2022
599	21	"Shocking! The True Identity of the Mystery Man Vergo!"; Transliteration: "Shōgeki! Nazo no Otoko Verugo no Shōtai!" (Japanese: 衝撃！謎の男ヴェルゴの正体！)	Yoshihiro Ueda	Jin Tanaka	June 9, 2013	December 18, 2022
600	22	"Save the Children! The Master's Evil Hands Close In!"; Transliteration: "Kodomo-tachi o Mamore! Semaru Masutā no Ma no Te" (Japanese: 子供達を守れ！迫るM(マスター)の魔の手)	Ayako Hiraike	Shōji Yonemura	June 16, 2013	January 8, 2023
601	23	"Shaking Up the New World! Caesar's Horrendous Experiment!"; Transliteration: "Shin Sekai Gekishin - Shīzā Akumu no Jikken" (Japanese: 新世界激震 シーザー悪夢の実験)	Directed by : Takahiro Imamura; Storyboarded by : Keiji Gotoh	Tomohiro Nakayama	June 23, 2013	January 15, 2023
602	24	"The Deadliest Weapon of Mass Destruction in History! Land of the Dead!"; Transliteration: "Shijō Saiaku no Satsuriku Heiki! Shinokuni" (Japanese: 史上最悪の殺戮兵器！シノクニ)	Takashi Ōtsuka	Yoshiyuki Suga	June 30, 2013	January 22, 2023
603	25	"Launching the Counter Attack! Luffy and Law's Great Escape!"; Transliteration: "Hangeki Kaishi! Rufi to Rō Dai-Dasshutsu" (Japanese: 反撃開始！ルフィ・(と)ロー大脱出)	Aya Komaki	Jin Tanaka	July 7, 2013	January 29, 2023
604	26	"Get to Building R! The Pirate Alliance's Great Advance!"; Transliteration: "Mezase Āru-tō! Kaizoku Dōmei Kai-Shingeki!" (Japanese: めざせR(アー)棟！海賊同盟快進撃！)	Tetsuya Endō	Jin Tanaka	July 14, 2013	February 12, 2023
605	27	"Tashigi's Tears! G-5's Desperate Breakthrough Plan!"; Transliteration: "Tashigi no Namida - Jī-Faibu Kesshi no Toppa Sakusen" (Japanese: たしぎの涙 G5(ジー・ファイブ)決死の突破作戦)	Yoshihiro Ueda	Tomohiro Nakayama	July 21, 2013	March 5, 2023
606	28	"The Treacherous Vice Admiral! Demon Bamboo Vergo!"; Transliteration: "Uragiri no Chūjō! Kichiku no Verugo" (Japanese: 裏切りの中将！鬼竹のヴェルゴ)	Directed by : Takahiro Imamura; Storyboarded by : Nobutaka Nishizawa	Shōji Yonemura	July 28, 2013	March 12, 2023
607	29	"A Fierce Battle Gets Heated! Luffy vs. Caesar!"; Transliteration: "Hakunetsu no Gekisen - Rufi tai Shīzā" (Japanese: 白熱の激戦 ルフィVS(たい)シーザー)	Takashi Ōtsuka	Yoshiyuki Suga	August 11, 2013	March 12, 2023
608	30	"A Mastermind Underground! Doflamingo Makes His Move!"; Transliteration: "Yami no Kuromaku! Dofuramingo Ugoku!" (Japanese: 闇の黒幕！ドフラミンゴ動く！)	Masahiro Hosoda	Shōji Yonemura	August 18, 2013	March 19, 2023
609	31	"Luffy Dies from Exposure?! The Spine-chilling Snow Woman Monet!"; Transliteration: "Rufi Tōshi!? Kyōfu no Yuki-On'na Mone!" (Japanese: ルフィ凍死!? 恐怖の雪女モネ！)	Aya Komaki	Tomohiro Nakayama	August 25, 2013	March 26, 2023
610	32	"Fists Collide! A Battle of the Two Vice Admirals!"; Transliteration: "Butsukaru Kobushi! Futari no Chūjō no Tatakai" (Japanese: ぶつかる拳！二人の中将の戦い)	Directed by : Yoshihiro Ueda; Storyboarded by : Kenji Yokoyama	Jin Tanaka	September 1, 2013	April 2, 2023
611	33	"A Small Dragon! Momonosuke Appears!"; Transliteration: "Chiisana Doragon! Momonosuke Arawaru" (Japanese: 小さなドラゴン！モモの助現る)	Directed by : Takahiro Imamura; Storyboarded by : Nobutaka Nishizawa	Yoshiyuki Suga	September 8, 2013	April 9, 2023
612	34	"A Deadly Fight in a Blizzard! The Straw Hats vs. the Snow Woman!"; Transliteration: "Fubuki no Shitō - Mugiwara no Ichimi tai Yuki-On'na" (Japanese: 吹雪の死闘 麦わらの一味VS(たい)雪女)	Ayako Hiraike	Jin Tanaka	September 15, 2013	April 16, 2023
613	35	"Showing Off His Techniques! Zoro's Formidable One-Sword Style!"; Transliteration: "Ōgi Sakuretsu! Zoro Saikyō no Ittō-ryū!" (Japanese: 奥義炸裂！ゾロ最強の一刀流！)	Yoshihiro Ueda	Tomohiro Nakayama	September 22, 2013	April 23, 2023
614	36	"To Save Her Friends! Mocha Runs at the Risk of Her Life!"; Transliteration: "Tomodachi o Mamoru! Mocha Inochi-gake no Tōsō" (Japanese: 友達を守る！モチャ命がけの逃走)	Aya Komaki	Shōji Yonemura	September 29, 2013	April 30, 2023
615	37	"Brownbeard in Grief! Luffy Lands a Furious Blow!"; Transliteration: "Chahige Hitsū! Rufi Ikari no Ichigeki" (Japanese: 茶ひげ悲痛！ルフィ怒りの一撃)	Tetsuya Endō	Hirohiko Kamisaka	October 6, 2013	May 7, 2023
616	38	"A Surprising Outcome! White Hunter vs. Vergo!"; Transliteration: "Shōgeki no Ketchaku! Sumōkā tai Verugo!" (Japanese: 衝撃の決着！白猟(スモーカー)VS(たい)ヴェルゴ！)	Takashi Ōtsuka	Yoshiyuki Suga	October 13, 2013	May 14, 2023
617	39	"Caesar's Defeat! The Powerful Grizzly Magnum!"; Transliteration: "Shīzā Gekiha! Saikyō no Gurizurī Magunamu" (Japanese: シーザー撃破！最強の灰熊銃(グリズリー・マグナム))	Masahiro Hosoda	Shōji Yonemura	October 20, 2013	May 21, 2023
618	40	"Raid! An Assassin from Dressrosa!"; Transliteration: "Shūrai! Doresurōza kara no Shikaku" (Japanese: 襲来！ドレスローザからの刺客)	Directed by : Yoshihiro Ueda; Storyboarded by : Nobutaka Nishizawa	Tomohiro Nakayama	October 27, 2013	June 4, 2023
619	41	"Running Wild! Invincible General Franky!"; Transliteration: "Ō-abare! Muteki no Furankī Shōgun" (Japanese: 大暴れ！無敵のフランキー将軍)	Aya Komaki	Hirohiko Kamisaka	November 3, 2013	June 11, 2023
620	42	"A Critical Situation! Punk Hazard Explodes!"; Transliteration: "Zettai Zetsumei! Panku Hazādo Dai-bakuhatsu" (Japanese: 絶体絶命！パンクハザード大爆発)	Ayako Hiraike	Jin Tanaka	November 10, 2013	June 18, 2023
621	43	"Capture Caesar! General Cannon Blasts!"; Transliteration: "Shīzā o Hokaku-seyo - Jeneraru Kyanon Sakuretsu" (Japanese: シーザーを捕獲せよ 将軍砲(ジェネラルキャノン)炸裂)	Yoshihiro Ueda	Yoshiyuki Suga	November 17, 2013	June 25, 2023
622	44	"A Touching Reunion! Momonosuke and Kin'emon!"; Transliteration: "Kandō no Saikai! Momonosuke to Kin'emon" (Japanese: 感動の再会！モモの助と錦えもん)	Directed by : Tetsuya Endō; Storyboarded by : Tetsuro Kodama	Shōji Yonemura	November 24, 2013	July 9, 2023
623	45	"It's Time to Say Goodbye! Leaving Punk Hazard!"; Transliteration: "Sekibetsu no Toki - Panku Hazādo Shukkō!" (Japanese: 惜別の時 パンクハザード出航！)	Directed by : Takahiro Imamura; Storyboarded by : Kenji Yokoyama	Tomohiro Nakayama	December 1, 2013	July 16, 2023
624	46	"The G-5 Wiped Out! Doflamingo's Sudden Attack!"; Transliteration: "Jī-Faibu Kaimetsu! Dofuramingo Kyūshū!" (Japanese: G5(ジー・ファイブ)壊滅！ドフラミンゴ急襲！)	Masahiro Hosoda	Jin Tanaka	December 8, 2013	July 23, 2023
625	47	"Intense! Aokiji vs. Doflamingo!"; Transliteration: "Kinpaku! Aokiji tai Dofuramingo" (Japanese: 緊迫！青キジVS(たい)ドフラミンゴ)	Tetsuya Endō	Yoshiyuki Suga	December 15, 2013	July 30, 2023
Caesar Retrieval
626	48	"Caesar Goes Missing! The Pirate Alliance Makes a Sortie!"; Transliteration: "Kieta Shīzā! Kaizoku Dōmei Shutsugeki" (Japanese: 消えたシーザー！海賊同盟出撃)	Takashi Ōtsuka	Jin Tanaka	December 22, 2013	August 6, 2023
627	49	"Luffy Dies at Sea?! The Pirate Alliance Comes Apart!"; Transliteration: "Rufi Umi ni Shisu!? Kaizoku Dōmei Hōkai" (Japanese: ルフィ海に死す!? 海賊同盟崩壊)	Aya Komaki	Tomohiro Nakayama	January 5, 2014	August 13, 2023
628	50	"A Major Turnaround! Luffy's Angry Iron Fist Strikes!"; Transliteration: "Dai-gyakuten! Sakuretsu Rufi Ikari no Tekken" (Japanese: 大逆転！炸裂ルフィ怒りの鉄拳)	Ayako Hiraike	Jin Tanaka	January 12, 2014	August 20, 2023

=== Season 17: Dressrosa (2014–16) ===
No. overall	No. in season	Title	Directed by	Written by	Original release date	English air date
629	1	"Startling! The Big News Shakes Up the New World!"; Transliteration: "Gekishin! Shin Sekai Ugokasu Dai-nyūsu" (Japanese: 激震！新世界動かす大ニュース)	Yoshihiro Ueda	Hirohiko Kamisaka	January 19, 2014	September 17, 2023
630	2	"Explore! A Kingdom of Love and Passion - Dressrosa!"; Transliteration: "Bōken! Ai to Jōnetsu no Kuni Doresurōza" (Japanese: 冒険！愛と情熱の国ドレスローザ)	Hiroaki Miyamoto	Hirohiko Kamisaka	January 26, 2014	September 17, 2023
631	3	"Full of Enthusiasm! The Corrida Colosseum!"; Transliteration: "Nekkyō Uzumaku - Korīda Koroshiamu" (Japanese: 熱狂渦巻く コリーダコロシアム)	Masahiro Hosoda	Shōji Yonemura	February 2, 2014	September 24, 2023
632	4	"A Dangerous Love! The Dancer Girl - Violet!"; Transliteration: "Kiken na Koi - Odoriko Vaioretto" (Japanese: 危険な恋 踊り娘ヴァイオレット)	Katsumi Tokoro	Yoshiyuki Suga	February 9, 2014	September 24, 2023
633	5	"A Formidable, Unknown Warrior! Here Comes Lucy!"; Transliteration: "Saikyō no Mumei Senshi! Rūshī Tōjō" (Japanese: 最強の無名戦士！ルーシー登場)	Tetsuya Endō	Shōji Yonemura	February 16, 2014	October 1, 2023
634	6	"A Pirate Noble! Cavendish!"; Transliteration: "Kaizoku Kikōshi Kyabendisshu" (Japanese: 海賊貴公子 キャベンディッシュ)	Aya Komaki	Tomohiro Nakayama	February 23, 2014	October 1, 2023
635	7	"The Fateful Reunion! Bellamy the Hyena!"; Transliteration: "Unmei no Saikai - Haiena no Beramī" (Japanese: 運命の再会 ハイエナのベラミー)	Directed by : Takahiro Imamura; Storyboarded by : Kenji Yokoyama	Shōji Yonemura	March 2, 2014	October 8, 2023
636	8	"A Super Rookie! Bartolomeo the Cannibal!"; Transliteration: "Chōshinsei! Hitokui no Barutoromeo" (Japanese: 超新星！人食いのバルトロメオ)	Yoshihiro Ueda	Jin Tanaka	March 16, 2014	October 8, 2023
637	9	"Big Names Duke It Out! The Heated Block B Battle!"; Transliteration: "Gun'yū-kakkyo! Hakunetsu no Bī-Burokku!" (Japanese: 群雄割拠！白熱のB(ビー)ブロック！)	Katsumi Tokoro	Hirohiko Kamisaka	March 23, 2014	October 15, 2023
638	10	"A Deadly Blow! The Astonishing King Punch!"; Transliteration: "Ichigeki-hissatsu! Kyōi no Kingu Panchi" (Japanese: 一撃必殺！驚異のキング・パンチ)	Ayako Hiraike	Yoshiyuki Suga	March 30, 2014	October 15, 2023
639	11	"The Fighting Fish Strike! Across the Deadly Iron Bridge!"; Transliteration: "Tōgyo Shūrai! Shi no Tekkyō o Toppa Seyo" (Japanese: 闘魚襲来！死の鉄橋を突破せよ)	Directed by : Takashi Ōtsuka; Storyboarded by : Hiroaki Miyamoto	Shōji Yonemura	April 6, 2014	November 12, 2023
640	12	"Explore! Fairies' Island - Green Bit!"; Transliteration: "Bōken! Yōsei no Shima Gurīn Bitto" (Japanese: 冒険！妖精の島グリーンビット)	Directed by : Yoshihiro Ueda; Storyboarded by : Yutaka Uemura	Tomohiro Nakayama	April 13, 2014	November 19, 2023
641	13	"The Unknown World! The Tontatta Kingdom!"; Transliteration: "Shirarezaru Sekai - Tontatta Ōkoku" (Japanese: 知られざる世界 トンタッタ王国)	Directed by : Toshinori Fukuzawa; Storyboarded by : Aya Komaki	Hirohiko Kamisaka	April 20, 2014	November 19, 2023
642	14	"The Stratagem of the Century! Doflamingo Makes His Move!"; Transliteration: "Seiki no Bōryaku - Dofuramingo Ugoku" (Japanese: 世紀の謀略 ドフラミンゴ動く！)	Masahiro Hosoda	Jin Tanaka	April 27, 2014	November 26, 2023
643	15	"Shaking Heaven and Earth! Admiral Fujitora's Power!"; Transliteration: "Tenchi Yurugasu! Taishō Fujitora no Jitsuryoku" (Japanese: 天地ゆるがす！大将藤虎の実力)	Yoshihiro Ueda	Yoshiyuki Suga	May 4, 2014	November 26, 2023
644	16	"A Blow of Anger! A Giant vs. Lucy!"; Transliteration: "Ikari no Ichigeki! Kyojin tai Rūshī" (Japanese: 怒りの一撃！巨人VS(たい)ルーシー)	Tetsuya Endō	Shōji Yonemura	May 11, 2014	December 3, 2023
645	17	"Destruction Cannon Blasts! Lucy in Trouble!"; Transliteration: "Hakai-hō Sakuretsu! Rūshī Kiki-ippatsu" (Japanese: 破壊砲炸裂！ルーシー危機一髪)	Katsumi Tokoro	Jin Tanaka	May 18, 2014	December 3, 2023
646	18	"The Legendary Pirate! Don Chin Jao!"; Transliteration: "Densetsu no Kaizoku - Don Chinjao!" (Japanese: 伝説の海賊 首領・チンジャオ！)	Aya Komaki	Tomohiro Nakayama	May 25, 2014	December 10, 2023
647	19	"Light and Shadow! Darkness Behind Dressrosa!"; Transliteration: "Hikari to Kage - Doresurōza ni Hisomu Yami!" (Japanese: 光と影 ドレスローザに潜む闇！)	Directed by : Ayako Hiraike; Storyboarded by : Yutaka Uemura	Yoshiyuki Suga	June 1, 2014	December 10, 2023
648	20	"Making a Sortie! The Legendary Hero Usoland!"; Transliteration: "Shutsugeki - Densetsu no Hīrō Usorando" (Japanese: 出撃 伝説のヒーローウソランド)	Directed by : Tetsuya Endō; Storyboarded by : Kenji Yokoyama	Tomohiro Nakayama	June 8, 2014	December 17, 2023
649	21	"The Fierce Battle Coming to the End! Lucy vs. Chin Jao!"; Transliteration: "Gekisen Ketchaku - Rūshī tai Chinjao" (Japanese: 激戦決着 ルーシーVS(たい)チンジャオ)	Yoshihiro Ueda	Jin Tanaka	June 15, 2014	January 14, 2024
650	22	"Luffy and the Gladiator of Fate - Rebecca!"; Transliteration: "Rufi to Shukumei no Ken Tōshi Rebekka" (Japanese: ルフィと宿命の剣闘士レベッカ)	Masahiro Hosoda	Shōji Yonemura	June 22, 2014	January 21, 2024
651	23	"Protect You to the End! Rebecca and the Toy Soldier!"; Transliteration: "Mamorinuku! Rebekka to Omocha no Heitai" (Japanese: 守り抜く！レベッカとおもちゃの兵隊)	Toshinori Fukuzawa	Yoshiyuki Suga	June 29, 2014	January 28, 2024
652	24	"The Last - and Bloodiest - Block! Block D Battle Begins!"; Transliteration: "Saigo no Chō Gekisen Ku - Dī-Burokku Kaisen" (Japanese: 最後の超激戦区 D(ディー)ブロック開戦)	Katsumi Tokoro	Shōji Yonemura	July 6, 2014	February 4, 2024
653	25	"A Decisive Battle! Giolla vs. the Straw Hats!"; Transliteration: "Kessen! Jōra tai Mugiwara no Ichimi" (Japanese: 決戦！ジョーラVS(たい)麦わらの一味)	Tetsuya Endō	Tomohiro Nakayama	July 13, 2014	February 11, 2024
654	26	"Beautiful Sword! Cavendish of the White Horse!"; Transliteration: "Biken! Hakuba no Kyabendisshu" (Japanese: 美剣！白馬のキャベンディッシュ！)	Yoshihiro Ueda	Jin Tanaka	July 20, 2014	February 18, 2024
655	27	"A Big Clash! Sanji vs. Doflamingo!"; Transliteration: "Dai Gekitotsu! Sanji tai Dofuramingo" (Japanese: 大激突！サンジVS(たい)ドフラミンゴ)	Ayako Hiraike	Yoshiyuki Suga	August 3, 2014	February 25, 2024
656	28	"Rebecca's Special Attack! Back-to-the-Water Dance!"; Transliteration: "Rebekka Hissatsu Ken! Haisui no Kenbu" (Japanese: レベッカ必殺剣！背水の剣舞)	Toshinori Fukuzawa	Shōji Yonemura	August 10, 2014	March 3, 2024
657	29	"The Most Violent Fighter! Logan vs. Rebecca!"; Transliteration: "Saikyō no Senshi! Rōgan tai Rebekka" (Japanese: 最凶の戦士！ローガンVS(たい)レベッカ)	Kōhei Kureta	Hirohiko Kamisaka	August 17, 2014	March 10, 2024
658	30	"A Big Surprise! A True Identity of the Toy Soldier!"; Transliteration: "Shōgeki! Omocha no Heitai no Shōtai!" (Japanese: 衝撃！おもちゃの兵隊の正体！)	Katsumi Tokoro	Tomohiro Nakayama	August 24, 2014	March 24, 2024
659	31	"A Horrible Past! The Secret of Dressrosa!"; Transliteration: "Senritsu no Kako! Doresurōza no Himitsu" (Japanese: 戦慄の過去！ドレスローザの秘密)	Yoshihiro Ueda	Shōji Yonemura	August 31, 2014	March 31, 2024
660	32	"A Nightmare! The Tragic Night of Dressrosa!"; Transliteration: "Akumu! Doresurōza Higeki no Ichiya" (Japanese: 悪夢！ドレスローザ悲劇の一夜)	Tetsuya Endō	Yoshiyuki Suga	September 7, 2014	April 7, 2024
661	33	"A Showdown Between the Warlords! Law vs. Doflamingo!"; Transliteration: "Shichibukai Taiketsu - Rō tai Dofuramingo" (Japanese: 七武海対決 ローVS(たい)ドフラミンゴ)	Directed by : Satoshi Itō; Storyboarded by : Takashi Ōtsuka	Jin Tanaka	September 14, 2014	April 14, 2024
662	34	"Two Great Rivals Meet Each Other! Straw Hat and Heavenly Demon!"; Transliteration: "Ryōyū Aimamieru! Mugiwara to Ten Yasha" (Japanese: 両雄相まみえる！麦わらと天夜叉)	Masahiro Hosoda	Hirohiko Kamisaka	September 21, 2014	April 21, 2024
663	35	"Luffy Astonished! The Man Who Inherits Ace's Will!"; Transliteration: "Rufi Kyōgaku - Ēsu no Ishi o Tsugu Otoko" (Japanese: ルフィ驚愕 エースの意志を継ぐ男)	Directed by : Tetsuya Endō; Storyboarded by : Kenji Yokoyama	Tomohiro Nakayama	September 28, 2014	April 21, 2024
664	36	"Operation SOP Starts! Usoland Charges Forth!"; Transliteration: "Esu-Ō-Pī Sakusen Kaishi - Usorando Totsugeki" (Japanese: SOP(エス・オー・ピー)作戦開始 ウソランド突撃)	Yoshihiro Ueda	Shōji Yonemura	October 5, 2014	April 28, 2024
665	37	"A Burning Passion! Rebecca vs. Suleiman!"; Transliteration: "Atsuki Omoi - Rebekka tai Sureiman" (Japanese: 熱き思い レベッカVS(たい)スレイマン)	Katsumi Tokoro	Yoshiyuki Suga	October 12, 2014	April 28, 2024
666	38	"The End of the Match?! A Surprising Result of Block D!"; Transliteration: "Shōsha Kettei!? Dī-Burokku Shōgeki no Ketsumatsu" (Japanese: 勝者決定!? D(ディー)ブロック衝撃の結末)	Directed by : Toshinori Fukuzawa; Storyboarded by : Tetsuaki Matsuda	Jin Tanaka	October 19, 2014	May 5, 2024
667	39	"The Admiral's Decision! Fujitora vs. Doflamingo!"; Transliteration: "Taishō no Ketsudan - Fujitora tai Dofuramingo" (Japanese: 大将の決断 藤虎VS(たい)ドフラミンゴ)	Nobuharu Kamanaka	Shōji Yonemura	October 26, 2014	May 5, 2024
668	40	"The Final Round Starts! Diamante the Hero Shows Up!"; Transliteration: "Kesshō Kaishi - Eiyū Diamante Tōjō" (Japanese: 決勝開始 英雄ディアマンテ登場)	Tetsuya Endō	Tomohiro Nakayama	November 2, 2014	May 26, 2024
669	41	"A Moving Castle! The Top Executive Pica Rises Up!"; Transliteration: "Ugoku Shiro! Saikō Kanbu Pīka Shutsugen!" (Japanese: 動く城！最高幹部ピーカ出現！)	Yoshihiro Ueda	Yoshiyuki Suga	November 9, 2014	June 2, 2024
670	42	"Dragon Claw Strikes! Lucy's Intimidating Attack!"; Transliteration: "Ryū no Tsume Sakuretsu! Rūshī Kyōi no Ichigeki!" (Japanese: 竜の爪炸裂！ルーシー脅威の一撃！)	Directed by : Aya Komaki; Storyboarded by : Kōhei Hatano & Kenji Yokoyama	Hirohiko Kamisaka	November 16, 2014	June 9, 2024
671	43	"Defeat Sugar! The Army of the Little People Charges!"; Transliteration: "Datō Shugā - Kobito no Heitai Totsugeki!" (Japanese: 打倒シュガー 小人の兵隊突撃！)	Masahiro Hosoda	Shōji Yonemura	November 23, 2014	June 16, 2024
672	44	"The Last Light of Hope! The Secret of Our Commander!"; Transliteration: "Saigo no Hikari - Warera ga Taichō no Himitsu!" (Japanese: 最後の光 我らが隊長の秘密！)	Katsumi Tokoro	Tomohiro Nakayama	November 30, 2014	June 23, 2024
673	45	"The Rupture Man! Gladius Blows Up Big Time!"; Transliteration: "Panku Ningen - Guradiusu Dai Bakuhatsu!" (Japanese: 破裂(パンク)人間 グラディウス大爆発！)	Directed by : Tetsuya Endō; Storyboarded by : Tetsuaki Matsuda	Jin Tanaka	December 7, 2014	June 30, 2024
674	46	"A Liar! Usoland on the Run!"; Transliteration: "Usotsuki - Usorando Tōsō-chū!" (Japanese: ウソつき ウソランド逃走中！)	Directed by : Satoshi Itō; Storyboarded by : Toshinori Fukuzawa	Hirohiko Kamisaka	December 14, 2014	July 7, 2024
675	47	"A Fateful Encounter! Kyros and King Riku!"; Transliteration: "Unmei no Deai - Kyurosu to Riku Ō" (Japanese: 運命の出会い キュロスとリク王)	Yoshihiro Ueda	Yoshiyuki Suga	December 21, 2014	July 14, 2024
676	48	"The Operation Failed! Usoland the Hero Dies?!"; Transliteration: "Sakusen Shippai! Eiyū Usorando Shisu!?" (Japanese: 作戦失敗！英雄ウソランド死す!?)	Tetsuya Endō	Yoshiyuki Suga	December 28, 2014	July 14, 2024
677	49	"The Legend Is Back! Kyros' All-Out Blow!"; Transliteration: "Densetsu Fukkatsu! Kyurosu Konshin no Ichigeki" (Japanese: 伝説復活！キュロス渾身の一撃)	Aya Komaki	Shōji Yonemura	January 11, 2015	July 21, 2024
678	50	"The Fire Fist Strikes! The Flame-Flame Fruit Power Returns!"; Transliteration: "Hiken Sakuretsu! Fukkatsu Mera-Mera no Mi no Chikara" (Japanese: 火拳炸裂！復活メラメラの実の力)	Directed by : Yoshihiro Ueda; Storyboarded by : Kōhei Kureta	Jin Tanaka	January 18, 2015	July 21, 2024
679	51	"Dashing onto the Scene! The Chief of Staff of the Revolutionary Army, Sabo!"; Transliteration: "Sassō Tōjō - Kakumei-gun Sanbō Sōchō Sabo!" (Japanese: 颯爽登場 革命軍参謀総長サボ！)	Masahiro Hosoda	Hirohiko Kamisaka	January 25, 2015	August 11, 2024
680	52	"The Devil's Trap! A Dressrosa Extermination Plan!"; Transliteration: "Akuma no Wana - Doresurōza Senmetsu Sakusen" (Japanese: 悪魔の罠 ドレスローザ殲滅作戦)	Directed by : Satoshi Itō; Storyboarded by : Masayoshi Nishida	Tomohiro Nakayama	February 1, 2015	August 18, 2024
681	53	"The 500 Million Berry Man! Target: Usoland!"; Transliteration: "Go Oku no Otoko - Nerawareta Usorando!" (Japanese: 五億の男 狙われたウソランド！)	Katsumi Tokoro	Yoshiyuki Suga	February 8, 2015	August 25, 2024
682	54	"Breaking Through Enemy Lines! Luffy and Zoro Launch the Counter-Attack!"; Transliteration: "Tekijin Toppa - Rufi to Zoro Hangeki Kaishi" (Japanese: 敵陣突破 ルフィ・(と)ゾロ反撃開始)	Yoshihiro Ueda	Hirohiko Kamisaka	February 15, 2015	September 1, 2024
683	55	"With a Rumbling of the Ground! The God of Destruction - Giant Pica Descends!"; Transliteration: "Daichi Meidō - Hakai-shin Kyodai Pīka Kōrin" (Japanese: 大地鳴動 破壊神巨大ピーカ降臨)	Toshinori Fukuzawa	Shōji Yonemura	March 1, 2015	September 8, 2024
684	56	"Gathering into a Powerful Front! Luffy and a Group of Brutal Warriors!"; Transliteration: "Dai Shūketsu! Rufi to Kyōaku Senshi Gundan" (Japanese: 大集結！ルフィと凶悪戦士軍団)	Ayako Hiraike	Jin Tanaka	March 15, 2015	September 8, 2024
685	57	"Steady Progress! Luffy's Army vs. Pica!"; Transliteration: "Kai Shingeki! Rufi Gundan tai Pīka!" (Japanese: 快進撃！ルフィ軍団VS(たい)ピーカ！)	Aya Komaki	Tomohiro Nakayama	March 22, 2015	September 15, 2024
686	58	"A Shocking Confession! Law's Soulful Vow!"; Transliteration: "Shōgeki Kokuhaku! Rō Atsuki Tamashī no Chikai!" (Japanese: 衝撃告白！ロー熱き魂の誓い！)	Tetsuya Endō	Jin Tanaka	March 29, 2015	September 15, 2024
687	59	"A Big Collision! Chief of Staff - Sabo vs. Admiral Fujitora!"; Transliteration: "Dai Gekitotsu! Sanbō Sōchō Sabo tai Taishō Fujitora" (Japanese: 大激突！参謀総長サボVS(たい)大将藤虎)	Masahiro Hosoda	Tomohiro Nakayama	April 5, 2015	September 22, 2024
688	60	"A Desperate Situation! Luffy Gets Caught in a Trap!"; Transliteration: "Zettai Zetsumei - Wana ni Kakatta Rufi!" (Japanese: 絶体絶命 罠にかかったルフィ！)	Yoshihiro Ueda	Atsuhiro Tomioka	April 12, 2015	September 22, 2024
689	61	"A Great Escape! Luffy's Tide-Turning Elephant Gun!"; Transliteration: "Dai Dasshutsu! Rufi Kishikaisei no Zōjū" (Japanese: 大脱出！ルフィ起死回生の象銃)	Directed by : Satoshi Itō; Storyboarded by : Hiroaki Miyamoto	Hirohiko Kamisaka	April 19, 2015	September 29, 2024
690	62	"A United Front! Luffy's Breakthrough to the Victory!"; Transliteration: "Kyōdō Sensen - Rufi Shōri e no Toppakō" (Japanese: 共同戦線 ルフィ勝利への突破口)	Directed by : Aya Komaki; Storyboarded by : Masatoshi Chioka	Shōji Yonemura	April 26, 2015	October 6, 2024
691	63	"The Second Samurai! Evening Shower Kanjuro Appears!"; Transliteration: "Futarime no Samurai - Yūdachi Kanjūrō Tōjō" (Japanese: 二人目の侍 夕立ちカン十郎登場)	Directed by : Makoto Sonoda; Storyboarded by : Katsumi Tokoro	Tomohiro Nakayama	May 3, 2015	October 13, 2024
692	64	"A Hard-Fought Battle Against Pica! Zoro's Deadly Attack!"; Transliteration: "Gekitō Pīka Sen - Zoro Hissatsu no Ichigeki!" (Japanese: 激闘ピーカ戦 ゾロ必殺の一撃！)	Directed by : Ayako Hiraike; Storyboarded by : Ayako Hiraike & Yoshihiro Ueda	Jin Tanaka	May 10, 2015	November 3, 2024
693	65	"The Little People's Princess! Captive Mansherry!"; Transliteration: "Kobito no Hime - Toraware no Mansherī" (Japanese: 小人の姫 囚われのマンシェリー)	Aya Komaki	Atsuhiro Tomioka	May 17, 2015	November 10, 2024
694	66	"Invincible! A Gruesome Army of Headcracker Dolls!"; Transliteration: "Fujimi! Kyōfu no Atamawari Ningyō Gundan" (Japanese: 不死身！恐怖の頭割り人形軍団)	Yoshihiro Ueda	Shōji Yonemura	May 24, 2015	November 17, 2024
695	67	"Risking Their Lives! Luffy is the Trump Card for Victory!"; Transliteration: "Inochi Kakete! Rufi wa Shōri no Kirifuda" (Japanese: 命かけて！ルフィは勝利の切り札)	Tetsuya Endō	Tomohiro Nakayama	May 31, 2015	November 24, 2024
696	68	"A Tearful Reunion! Rebecca and Kyros!"; Transliteration: "Namida no Saikai - Rebekka to Kyurosu!" (Japanese: 涙の再会 レベッカとキュロス！)	Satoshi Itō	Jin Tanaka	June 7, 2015	December 1, 2024
697	69	"One Shot One Kill! The Man Who Will Save Dressrosa!"; Transliteration: "Ichigeki-hikkoro - Doresurōza o Sukuu Otoko" (Japanese: 一撃必殺 ドレスローザを救う男)	Masahiro Hosoda	Atsuhiro Tomioka	June 14, 2015	December 8, 2024
698	70	"Anger Erupts! Luffy and Law's Ultimate Stratagem!"; Transliteration: "Ikari Bakuhatsu - Rufi to Rō Saikyō no Hisaku" (Japanese: 怒り爆発 ルフィ・(と)ロー最強の秘策)	Tatsuya Nagamine	Shōji Yonemura	June 21, 2015	December 15, 2024
699	71	"A Noble Family! The True Identity of Doflamingo!"; Transliteration: "Kedakaki Ichizoku - Dofuramingo no Shōtai!" (Japanese: 気高き一族 ドフラミンゴの正体！)	Aya Komaki	Tomohiro Nakayama	June 28, 2015	January 12, 2025
700	72	"The Ultimate Power! The Secret of the Op-Op Fruit!"; Transliteration: "Kyūkyoku no Chikara - Ope-Ope no Mi no Himitsu!" (Japanese: 究極の力 オペオペの実の秘密！)	Kentarō Fujita	Jin Tanaka	July 5, 2015	January 19, 2025
701	73	"Sad Memories! Law, the Boy from the White Town!"; Transliteration: "Kanashiki Kioku - Shiroi Machi no Shōnen Rō!" (Japanese: 悲しき記憶 白い町の少年ロー！)	Katsumi Tokoro	Shōji Yonemura	July 12, 2015	January 26, 2025
702	74	"A Celestial Dragon! Doffy's Stormy Past!"; Transliteration: "Tenryūbito! Dofi no Sōzetsu-naru Kako" (Japanese: 天竜人！ドフィの壮絶なる過去)	Yoshihiro Ueda	Atsuhiro Tomioka	July 19, 2015	February 2, 2025
703	75	"A Rocky Road! Law and Corazon's Journey of Life!"; Transliteration: "Kunan no Michi - Rō to Korason Inochi no Tabi" (Japanese: 苦難の道 ローとコラソン命の旅)	Tetsuya Endō	Hirohiko Kamisaka	August 2, 2015	February 9, 2025
704	76	"The Time Is Ticking Down! Seize the Op-Op Fruit!"; Transliteration: "Toki Semaru! Ope-Ope no Mi o Ubae!" (Japanese: 時迫る！オペオペの実を奪え！)	Masahiro Hosoda	Hirohiko Kamisaka	August 9, 2015	February 16, 2025
705	77	"The Moment of Resolution! Corazon's Farewell Smile!"; Transliteration: "Kakugo no Toki - Korason Wakare no Egao!" (Japanese: 覚悟の時 コラソン別れの笑顔！)	Satoshi Itō	Tomohiro Nakayama	August 16, 2015	February 23, 2025
706	78	"Advance, Law! The Kindhearted Man's Final Fight!"; Transliteration: "Ike Rō - Yasashiki Otoko Saigo no Tatakai!" (Japanese: 行けロー 優しき男最期の戦い！)	Tatsuya Nagamine	Jin Tanaka	August 23, 2015	March 2, 2025
707	79	"To Be Free! Law's Injection Shot Blasts!"; Transliteration: "Jiyū e! Rō Injekushon Shotto Sakuretsu" (Japanese: 自由へ！ロー注射(インジェクション)ショット炸裂)	Yoshihiro Ueda	Shōji Yonemura	August 30, 2015	March 9, 2025
708	80	"An Intense Battle! Law vs. Doflamingo!"; Transliteration: "Atsuki Tatakai - Rō tai Dofuramingo" (Japanese: 熱き闘い ローVS(たい)ドフラミンゴ)	Kentarō Fujita	Atsuhiro Tomioka	September 6, 2015	March 9, 2025
709	81	"A Decisive Battle Against the Executives! Proud Hajrudin!"; Transliteration: "Kanbu Kessen - Hokori Takaki Hairudin" (Japanese: 幹部決戦 誇り高きハイルディン)	Katsumi Tokoro	Jin Tanaka	September 13, 2015	March 16, 2025
710	82	"The Battle of Love! The New Leader Sai vs. Baby 5!"; Transliteration: "Ai no Kessen - Shin Tōryō Sai tai Bebī Faibu" (Japanese: 愛の決戦 新棟梁サイVS(たい)ベビー5(ファイブ))	Aya Komaki	Tomohiro Nakayama	September 20, 2015	March 16, 2025
711	83	"The Man's Pride! Bellamy's Last Charge!"; Transliteration: "Otoko no Iji - Beramī Saigo no Totsugeki!" (Japanese: 男の意地 ベラミー最期の突撃！)	Toshinori Fukuzawa	Shōji Yonemura	September 27, 2015	March 23, 2025
712	84	"A Strong Wind and a Surge! Hakuba vs. Dellinger!"; Transliteration: "Shippūdotō - Hakuba tai Derinjā" (Japanese: 疾風怒濤 ハクバVS(たい)デリンジャー)	Tetsuya Endō	Jin Tanaka	October 4, 2015	March 23, 2025
713	85	"Barrier-Barrier! Homage Holy Fist Strikes!"; Transliteration: "Bari-Bari - Omāju Shinken Hatsudō!" (Japanese: バリバリ オマージュ神拳発動！)	Masahiro Hosoda	Tomohiro Nakayama	October 11, 2015	March 30, 2025
714	86	"The Healing Princess! Save Mansherry!"; Transliteration: "Iyashi no Hime - Mansherī o Sukue!" (Japanese: 癒しの姫 マンシェリーを救え！)	Yoshihiro Ueda	Hirohiko Kamisaka	October 18, 2015	March 30, 2025
715	87	"The Manly Duel! Señor's Elegy of Love!"; Transliteration: "Otoko no Kettō - Senyōru Ai no Banka" (Japanese: 男の決闘 セニョール愛の挽歌)	Satoshi Itō	Hirohiko Kamisaka	October 25, 2015	April 6, 2025
716	88	"Stardust of Death! Diamante's Storm of Vicious Attacks!"; Transliteration: "Shi no Hoshikuzu - Diamante Mōkō no Arashi" (Japanese: 死の星屑 ディアマンテ猛攻の嵐)	Aya Komaki	Shōji Yonemura	November 1, 2015	April 6, 2025
717	89	"Trueno Bastardo! Kyros' Furious Strike!"; Transliteration: "Turueno Basutādo! Kyurosu Ikari no Ichigeki!" (Japanese: 雷の破壊剣(トゥルエノバスタード)！キュロス怒りの一撃！)	Tatsuya Nagamine	Jin Tanaka	November 8, 2015	April 13, 2025
718	90	"Moving Across the Ground! The Giant Statue Pica's Surprise Maneuver!"; Transliteration: "Daichi Ōdan - Kyozō Pīka Kishū Sakusen!" (Japanese: 大地横断 巨像ピーカ奇襲作戦！)	Kentarō Fujita	Tomohiro Nakayama	November 15, 2015	April 13, 2025
719	91	"A Decisive Battle in Midair! Zoro's New Special Secret Technique Blasts!"; Transliteration: "Kūchū Kessen - Zoro Shin Hissatsu Ōgi Sakuretsu!" (Japanese: 空中決戦 ゾロ新必殺奥義炸裂！)	Katsumi Tokoro	Shōji Yonemura	November 22, 2015	April 20, 2025
720	92	"So Long! Bellamy's Farewell Blow!"; Transliteration: "Abayo! Beramī Wakare no Ichigeki!" (Japanese: あばよ！ベラミー別れの一撃！)	Tetsuya Endō	Hirohiko Kamisaka	November 29, 2015	April 20, 2025
721	93	"Law Dies! Luffy's Raging Onslaught!"; Transliteration: "Rō Shisu - Rufi Fundo no Mōkōgeki!" (Japanese: ロー死す ルフィ憤怒の猛攻撃！)	Yoshihiro Ueda	Jin Tanaka	December 6, 2015	April 27, 2025
722	94	"A Blade of Tenacity! The Gamma Knife Counterattack!"; Transliteration: "Shūnen no Ha - Gyakushū no Ganma Naifu!" (Japanese: 執念の刃 逆襲のガンマナイフ！)	Masahiro Hosoda	Tomohiro Nakayama	December 13, 2015	April 27, 2025
723	95	"A Collision of Haki! Luffy vs. Doflamingo!"; Transliteration: "Haki Gekitotsu - Rufi tai Dofuramingo" (Japanese: 覇気激突 ルフィVS(たい)ドフラミンゴ)	Satoshi Itō	Shōji Yonemura	December 20, 2015	May 4, 2025
724	96	"Unassailable! The Stunning Secret of Trebol!"; Transliteration: "Kōgeki Funō - Torēboru Shōgeki no Himitsu" (Japanese: 攻撃不能 トレーボル衝撃の秘密)	Directed by : Yasunori Koyama; Storyboarded by : Aya Komaki	Hirohiko Kamisaka	December 27, 2015	May 4, 2025
725	97	"Anger Erupts! I Will Take Everything Upon Myself!"; Transliteration: "Ikari Bakuhatsu - Ore ga Zenbu Hikiukeru" (Japanese: 怒り爆発 おれが全部引き受ける)	Directed by : Kentarō Fujita; Storyboarded by : Tatsuya Nagamine	Atsuhiro Tomioka	January 10, 2016	May 18, 2025
726	98	"Fourth Gear! The Phenomenal Bounce-man!"; Transliteration: "Gia Fōsu! Kyōi no Baundo-man!" (Japanese: ギア4(フォース)！驚異のバウンドマン！)	Toshinori Fukuzawa	Jin Tanaka	January 17, 2016	May 18, 2025
727	99	"A Massive Counterattack! Doflamingo's Awakening!"; Transliteration: "Dai Gyakushū! Dofuramingo no Kakusei!" (Japanese: 大逆襲！ドフラミンゴの覚醒！)	Yoshihiro Ueda	Shōji Yonemura	January 24, 2016	May 25, 2025
728	100	"Luffy! An All-Out Leo Bazooka!"; Transliteration: "Rufi! Konshin no Shishi Bazūka" (Japanese: ルフィ！渾身の獅子バズーカ)	Katsumi Tokoro	Tomohiro Nakayama	January 31, 2016	May 25, 2025
729	101	"Flame Dragon King! Protect Luffy's Life!"; Transliteration: "Kaen Ryūō - Rufi no Inochi o Mamorinuke" (Japanese: 火炎竜王 ルフィの命を守りぬけ)	Tetsuya Endō	Hirohiko Kamisaka	February 14, 2016 (Note: Originally aired on February 7, but its broadcast was interrupted due to breaking news regarding a rocket launch by North Korea.)	June 1, 2025
730	102	"Tears of Miracles! Mansherry's Fight!"; Transliteration: "Kiseki no Namida - Mansherī no Tatakai!" (Japanese: 奇跡の涙 マンシェリーの戦い！)	Masahiro Hosoda	Atsuhiro Tomioka	February 21, 2016	June 1, 2025
731	103	"As Long as We Breathe! Stop the Deadly Birdcage!"; Transliteration: "Inochi no Kagiri - Shi no Tori Kago o Tomero!" (Japanese: 命の限り 死の鳥カゴを止めろ！)	Directed by : Yasunori Koyama; Storyboarded by : Aya Komaki	Hirohiko Kamisaka	February 28, 2016	June 8, 2025
732	104	"Dead or Alive! A Fateful Countdown!"; Transliteration: "Seika Shika - Unmei no Kauntodaun" (Japanese: 生か死か 運命のカウントダウン)	Satoshi Itō	Jin Tanaka	March 6, 2016	June 8, 2025
733	105	"Attack on a Celestial! Luffy's King Kong Gun of Anger!"; Transliteration: "Ten o Utsu - Rufi Ikari no Kingu Kongu Gan" (Japanese: 天を討つ ルフィ怒りの大猿王銃(キングコングガン))	Toshinori Fukuzawa	Shōji Yonemura	March 20, 2016	June 15, 2025
734	106	"To Be Free! Dressrosa's Delight!"; Transliteration: "Jiyū e! Yorokobi no Doresurōza!" (Japanese: 自由へ！喜びのドレスローザ！)	Yoshihiro Ueda	Atsuhiro Tomioka	March 27, 2016	June 22, 2025
735	107	"The Unheard-of! Admiral Fujitora's Surprising Decision!"; Transliteration: "Zendai-mimon - Taishō Fujitora Shōgeki no Ketsudan!" (Japanese: 前代未聞 大将藤虎衝撃の決断！)	Kentarō Fujita	Tomohiro Nakayama	April 3, 2016	June 29, 2025
736	108	"Sending a Shock Wave! The Worst Generation Goes Into Action!"; Transliteration: "Gekishin Hashiru - Ugokidasu Saiaku no Sedai!" (Japanese: 激震走る 動き出す最悪の世代！)	Tetsuya Endō	Shōji Yonemura	April 10, 2016	July 20, 2025
737	109	"The Birth of the Legend! The Adventures of the Revolutionary Warrior Sabo!"; Transliteration: "Densetsu Tanjō - Kakumei Senshi Sabo no Bōken!" (Japanese: 伝説誕生 革命戦士サボの冒険！)	Katsumi Tokoro	Jin Tanaka	April 17, 2016	July 27, 2025
738	110	"The Brothers' Bond! The Untold Story Behind Luffy and Sabo's Reunion!"; Transliteration: "Kyōdai no Kizuna - Rufi to Sabo Saikai Hiwa" (Japanese: 兄弟の絆 ルフィ・(と)サボ再会秘話)	Masahiro Hosoda	Jin Tanaka	April 24, 2016	August 3, 2025
739	111	"The Strongest Creature! One of the Four Emperors - Kaido, King of the Beasts!"; Transliteration: "Saikyō no Seibutsu - Yonkō: Hyakujū no Kaidō" (Japanese: 最強の生物 四皇・百獣のカイドウ)	Satoshi Itō	Atsuhiro Tomioka	May 1, 2016	August 10, 2025
740	112	"Fujitora Takes Action! The Complete Siege of the Straw Hats!"; Transliteration: "Fujitora Ugoku - Mugiwara no Ichimi Kanzen Hōimō" (Japanese: 藤虎動く 麦わらの一味完全包囲網)	Yoshihiro Ueda	Tomohiro Nakayama	May 8, 2016	August 17, 2025
741	113	"A State of Emergency! Rebecca Is Kidnapped!"; Transliteration: "Hijō Jitai - Sarawa-reta Rebekka!" (Japanese: 非常事態 さらわれたレベッカ！)	Kentarō Fujita	Tomohiro Nakayama	May 15, 2016	August 24, 2025
742	114	"The Bond Between Father and Daughter! Kyros and Rebecca!"; Transliteration: "Oyako no Kizuna - Kyurosu to Rebekka!" (Japanese: 父娘の絆 キュロスとレベッカ！)	Katsumi Tokoro	Shōji Yonemura	May 22, 2016	August 31, 2025
743	115	"Men's Pride! Luffy vs. Fujitora, Head-to-Head!"; Transliteration: "Otoko no Iji - Rufi tai Fujitora Makkō Shōbu" (Japanese: 男の意地 ルフィVS(たい)藤虎真向勝負)	Directed by : Yasunori Koyama; Storyboarded by : Takashi Ōtsuka	Jin Tanaka	May 29, 2016	September 7, 2025
744	116	"No Way Out! Admiral Fujitora's Ruthless Pursuit!"; Transliteration: "Nigeba Nashi - Taishō Fujitora Hijō no Tsuigeki!" (Japanese: 逃場無し 大将藤虎非情の追撃！)	Tetsuya Endō	Atsuhiro Tomioka	June 5, 2016	September 14, 2025
745	117	"Sons' Cups! The Straw Hat Fleet Is Formed!"; Transliteration: "Kobun no Sakazuki - Kessei! Mugiwara Dai Sendan!" (Japanese: 子分の盃 結成！麦わら大船団！)	Yoshihiro Ueda	Tomohiro Nakayama	June 12, 2016	September 21, 2025
746	118	"The Numerous Rivals Struggle Amongst Themselves! The Raging Monsters of the New World"; Transliteration: "Gun'yū-kakkyo - Arekurū Shin Sekai no Kaibutsu-tachi" (Japanese: 群雄割拠 荒狂う新世界の怪物達)	Masahiro Hosoda	Shōji Yonemura	June 19, 2016	September 28, 2025

=== Season 18: Zou (2016–17) ===
No. overall	No. in season	Title	Directed by	Written by	Original release date	English air date
Silver Mine
747	1	"The Silver Fortress! Luffy and Barto's Great Adventure!"; Transliteration: "Gin no Yōsai - Rufi to Baruto Dai Bōken" (Japanese: 銀の要塞 ルフィとバルト大冒険)	Yoshihiro Ueda	Jin Tanaka	June 26, 2016	October 5, 2025
748	2	"An Underground Maze! Luffy vs. the Tram Human!"; Transliteration: "Chika Meikyū - Rufi tai Torokko Ningen" (Japanese: 地下迷宮 ルフィVS(たい)トロッコ人間)	Satoshi Itō	Jin Tanaka	July 3, 2016	October 12, 2025
749	3	"The Sword Technique Heats Up! Law and Zoro Finally Appear!"; Transliteration: "Kengi Hakunetsu - Law to Zoro Tsui ni Kenzan!" (Japanese: 剣技白熱 ロー・(と)ゾロ遂に見参！)	Kentarō Fujita	Shōji Yonemura	July 10, 2016	October 19, 2025
750	4	"A Desperate Situation! Luffy Fights a Battle in Extreme Heat!"; Transliteration: "Zettai Zetsumei - Rufi Kyokugen no Shakunetsu Kessen" (Japanese: 絶対絶命 ルフィ極限の灼熱決戦)	Yoshihiro Ueda	Jin Tanaka	July 17, 2016	November 2, 2025
Zou
751	5	"Curtain-up on a New Adventure! Arriving at the Phantom Island, Zou!"; Transliteration: "Bōken Kaimaku - Maboroshi no Shima "Zō" Tōchaku!" (Japanese: 冒険開幕 幻の島｢ゾウ｣到着！)	Katsumi Tokoro	Tomohiro Nakayama	July 31, 2016	November 9, 2025
752	6	"The New Warlord! The Legendary Whitebeard's Son Appears!"; Transliteration: "Shin Shichibukai - Densetsu: Shirohige no Musuko Tōjō" (Japanese: 新七武海 伝説・白ひげの息子登場)	Tetsuya Endō	Atsuhiro Tomioka	August 7, 2016	November 16, 2025
753	7	"A Deadly Elephant Climb! A Great Adventure on the Back of the Giant Elephant!"; Transliteration: "Kesshi no Tozō - Kyozō no Se no Dai-bōken!" (Japanese: 決死の登象 巨象の背の大冒険！)	Takashi Ōtsuka	Atsuhiro Tomioka	August 21, 2016	November 23, 2025
754	8	"A Battle Begins! Luffy vs. the Mink Tribe!"; Transliteration: "Sentō Kaishi - Rufi tai Minku-zoku!" (Japanese: 戦闘開始 ルフィVS(たい)ミンク族！)	Yasunori Koyama	Atsuhiro Tomioka	August 28, 2016	November 30, 2025
755	9	"Garchu! The Straw Hats Reunite!"; Transliteration: "Garuchū! Mugiwara no Ichimi Sai Shūketsu" (Japanese: ガルチュー！麦わらの一味再集結)	Masahiro Hosoda	Tomohiro Nakayama	September 4, 2016	December 7, 2025
756	10	"Start to Counterattack! Great Moves by the Twirly Hat Crew!"; Transliteration: "Hangeki Kaishi - Guruwara no Ichimi Dai-katsuyaku!" (Japanese: 反撃開始 ぐるわらの一味大活躍！)	Satoshi Itō	Shōji Yonemura	September 11, 2016	December 14, 2025
757	11	"A Threat Descends! The Beast Pirates, Jack!"; Transliteration: "Kyoui Shurai - Hyakujuu Kaizokudan Jakku!" (Japanese: 脅威襲来 百獣海賊団ジャック！)	Yoshihiro Ueda	Atsuhiro Tomioka	September 25, 2016	December 21, 2025
758	12	"The King of the Day! Duke Dogstorm Appears!"; Transliteration: "Hiru no Ō - Inuarashi Koushaku Toujou!" (Japanese: 昼の王 イヌアラシ公爵登場！)	Kentarō Fujita	Tomohiro Nakayama	October 2, 2016	January 4, 2026
759	13	"The King of the Night! Master Cat Viper Emerges!"; Transliteration: "Yoru no Ō - Nekomamushi no Danna Kenzan!" (Japanese: 夜の王 ネコマムシの旦那見参！)	Katsumi Tokoro	Shōji Yonemura	October 9, 2016	January 11, 2026
760	14	"The Exterminated Capital! The Twirly Hat Crew Arrive!"; Transliteration: "Shuto Kaimetsu - Guru wara no Ichimi Jōriku!" (Japanese: 首都壊滅 ぐるわらの一味上陸！)	Tetsuya Endō	Jin Tanaka	October 16, 2016	January 18, 2026
761	15	"The Time Limit Closes In! The Bond Between the Mink Tribe and the Crew!"; Transliteration: "Kokugen Semaru - Minku Zoku to Ichimi no Kizuna!" (Japanese: 刻限迫る ミンク族と一味の絆！)	Yoshihiro Ueda	Atsuhiro Tomioka	October 23, 2016	January 25, 2026
762	16	"The Delinquent Comes Home! Emperor Big Mom's Assassins!"; Transliteration: "Akudō Kikyō Yon - Sumeragi Biggu Mamu no Shikaku" (Japanese: 悪童帰郷 四皇ビッグ・マムの刺客)	Directed by : Kentarō Fujita; Storyboarded by : Toshinori Fukuzawa	Tomohiro Nakayama	October 30, 2016	February 1, 2026
763	17	"The Truth Behind the Disappearance! Sanji Gets a Startling Invitation!"; Transliteration: "Shissō no Shinjitsu - Sanji Kyōgaku no Shōtai Jō" (Japanese: 失踪の真実 サンジ驚愕の招待状)	Satoshi Itō	Shōji Yonemura	November 6, 2016	February 8, 2026
764	18	"To My Buds! Sanji's Farewell Note!"; Transliteration: "Yarō-domo e - Sanji Wakare no Okitegami" (Japanese: 野郎共へ サンジ別れの置手紙)	Yasunori Koyama	Jin Tanaka	November 13, 2016	February 15, 2026
765	19	"Let's Go and Meet Master Cat Viper!"; Transliteration: "Nekomamushi no Dan'na ni Ai ni Yukō" (Japanese: ネコマムシの旦那に会いに行こう)	Tatsuya Nagamine	Atsuhiro Tomioka	November 20, 2016	February 22, 2026
766	20	"Luffy's Decision! Sanji on the Brink of Quitting!"; Transliteration: "Rufi Ketsudan - Sanji Dattai no Kiki!" (Japanese: ルフィ決断 サンジ脱退の危機！)	Masahiro Hosoda	Tomohiro Nakayama	November 27, 2016	March 1, 2026
767	21	"A Volatile Situation! The Dog and the Cat and the Samurai!"; Transliteration: "Isshokusokuhatsu - Inu to Neko to Samurai!" (Japanese: 一触即発 イヌとネコと侍！)	Toshinori Fukuzawa	Shōji Yonemura	December 4, 2016	March 8, 2026
768	22	"The Third One! Raizo of the Mist, the Ninja, Appears!"; Transliteration: "Sannin Me! Ninja: Kiri no Raizō Tōjō!" (Japanese: 三人目！忍者・霧の雷ぞう登場！)	Directed by : Yoshihiro Ueda; Storyboarded by : Tetsuya Endō	Jin Tanaka	December 11, 2016	March 15, 2026
769	23	"A Red Stone! A Guide to the One Piece!"; Transliteration: "Akai Ishi! "Wan Pīsu" e no Michishirube" (Japanese: 赤い石！“ひとつなぎの大秘宝(ワンピース)”への道標)	Katsumi Tokoro	Tomohiro Nakayama	December 18, 2016	March 22, 2026
770	24	"The Secret of the Land of Wano! The Kozuki Family and the Ponegliffs!"; Transliteration: "Wano Kuni no Himitsu - Kōzuki-ke to Pōnegurifu" (Japanese: ワノ国の秘密 光月家と歴史の本文(ポーネグリフ))	Kentarō Fujita	Tomohiro Nakayama	December 25, 2016	March 29, 2026
771	25	"A Vow Between Two Men! Luffy and Kozuki Momonosuke!"; Transliteration: "Otoko no Chikai - Rufi to Kōzuki Momonosuke" (Japanese: 男の誓い ルフィと光月モモの助)	Satoshi Itō	Atsuhiro Tomioka	January 8, 2017	April 5, 2026
772	26	"The Legendary Journey! The Dog and the Cat and the Pirate King!"; Transliteration: "Densetsu no Kōkai - Inu to Neko to Kaizoku-Ō!" (Japanese: 伝説の航海 イヌとネコと海賊王！)	Directed by : Yasunori Koyama; Storyboarded by : Tetsuya Endō	Shōji Yonemura	January 15, 2017	April 12, 2026
773	27	"The Nightmare Returns! The Invincible Jack's Fierce Attack!"; Transliteration: "Akumu Futatabi - Fujimi no Jakku Kyōshū" (Japanese: 悪夢再び 不死身のジャック強襲)	Yoshihiro Ueda	Jin Tanaka	January 22, 2017	April 19, 2026
774	28	"A Battle to Defend Zou! Luffy and Zunesha!"; Transliteration: "Zō Bōeisen - Rufi to Zunīsha!" (Japanese: ゾウ防衛戦 ルフィとズニーシャ！)	Takashi Ōtsuka	Atsuhiro Tomioka	January 29, 2017	April 26, 2026
775	29	"Save Zunesha! The Straw Hat's Rescue Operation!"; Transliteration: "Zunīsha o Sukue - Mugiwara Resukyū Dai Sakusen!" (Japanese: 巨象(ズニーシャ)を救え 麦わら救急(レスキュー)大作戦！)	Masahiro Hosoda	Hirohiko Kamisaka	February 5, 2017	May 3, 2026
776	30	"Saying Goodbye and Descending from the Elephant! Setting Out to Take Back Sanji!"; Transliteration: "Wakare no Gezō - Sanji Dakkan no Funade!" (Japanese: 別れの下象 サンジ奪還の船出！)	Yasunori Koyama	Tomohiro Nakayama	February 12, 2017	May 10, 2026
777	31	"To the Reverie! Princess Vivi and Princess Shirahoshi!"; Transliteration: "Reverī e - Ōjo Bibi to Shirahoshi Hime" (Japanese: 世界会議(レヴェリー)へ 王女ビビとしらほし姫)	Katsumi Tokoro	Shōji Yonemura	February 19, 2017	May 17, 2026
778	32	"To the Reverie! Rebecca and the Sakura Kingdom!"; Transliteration: "Reverī e - Rebekka to Sakura Ōkoku" (Japanese: 世界会議(レヴェリー)へ レベッカとサクラ王国)	Yoshihiro Ueda	Shōji Yonemura	February 26, 2017	May 24, 2026
779	33	"Kaido Returns! An Imminent Threat to the Worst Generation!"; Transliteration: "Kaidō Futatabi - Kyōi Semaru Saiaku no Sedai!" (Japanese: カイドウ再び 脅威迫る最悪の世代！)	Directed by : Kentarō Fujita; Storyboarded by : Tetsuya Endō	Jin Tanaka	March 5, 2017	May 31, 2026
Marine Rookie
780	34	"A Hungry Front! Luffy and the Navy Rookies!"; Transliteration: "Harapeko Sensen - Rufi to Kaigun Rūkī!" (Japanese: 空腹(ハラペコ)戦線 ルフィと海軍超新星(ルーキー)！)	Satoshi Itō	Hirohiko Kamisaka	March 19, 2017	June 14, 2026
781	35	"The Implacable Three! A Big Chase After the Straw Hats!"; Transliteration: "Shūnen no San-nin - Mugiwara Ichimi Dai Cheisu!" (Japanese: 執念の3人 麦わら一味大追撃戦(チェイス)！)	Yoshihiro Ueda	Tomohiro Nakayama	March 26, 2017	June 21, 2026
782	36	"The Devil's Fist! A Show Down! Luffy vs. Grount!"; Transliteration: "Akuma no Kobushi - Kessen! Rufi tai Guranto" (Japanese: 悪魔の拳 決戦！ルフィVS(たい)グラント)	Directed by : Satoshi Itō; Storyboarded by : Tetsuya Endō	Jin Tanaka	April 2, 2017	June 28, 2026

=== Season 19: Whole Cake Island (2017–19) ===
No. overall	No. in season	Title	Directed by	Written by	Original release date	English air date
Whole Cake Island
783	1	"Sanji's Homecoming! Into Big Mom's Territory!"; Transliteration: "Sanji Kikyō - Biggu Mamu no Nawabari e!" (Japanese: サンジ帰郷 ビッグ・マムの海域(ナワバリ)へ！)	Directed by : Yasunori Koyama; Storyboarded by : Tetsuya Endō	Tomohiro Nakayama	April 9, 2017	July 5, 2026
784	2	"Zero and Four! Encountering Germa 66!"; Transliteration: "Rei to Yon - Sōgū! Jeruma Daburu Shikkusu" (Japanese: 0と4 遭遇！ジェルマ66(ダブルシックス))	Kentarō Fujita	Shōji Yonemura	April 16, 2017	July 12, 2026
785	3	"A Deadly Poison Crisis! Luffy and Reiju!"; Transliteration: "Mōdoku no Kiki - Rufi to Reiju!" (Japanese: 猛毒の危機 ルフィとレイジュ！)	Directed by : Yusuke Suzuki; Storyboarded by : Masahiro Hosoda	Jin Tanaka	April 23, 2017	July 19, 2026
786	4	"Totto Land! Emperor Big Mom Appears!"; Transliteration: "Totto Rando! Yonkō Biggu Mamu Tōjō" (Japanese: 万国(トットランド)！四皇ビッグ・マム登場)	Directed by : Toshinori Fukuzawa; Storyboarded by : Tetsuya Endō	Tomohiro Nakayama	April 30, 2017	July 26, 2026
787	5	"The Emperor's Daughter! Sanji's Fiancée - Pudding!"; Transliteration: "Yonkō no Musume - Sanji no Fianse Purin" (Japanese: 四皇の娘 サンジの婚約者(フィアンセ)プリン)	Katsumi Tokoro	Shōji Yonemura	May 7, 2017	August 2, 2026
788	6	"A Massive Attack! Mom's Hunger Pangs!"; Transliteration: "Dai-shingeki! Kui-wazurai no Mamu" (Japanese: 大進撃！食いわずらいのマム)	Yoshihiro Ueda	Atsuhiro Tomioka	May 14, 2017	August 9, 2026
789	7	"The Capital City Falls?! Big Mom and Jimbei!"; Transliteration: "Shuto Hōkai!? Biggu Mamu to Jinbē" (Japanese: 首都崩壊!? ビッグ・マムとジンベエ)	Yasunori Koyama	Shōji Yonemura	May 21, 2017	August 16, 2026
790	8	"The Emperor's Castle! Arriving at Whole Cake Island!"; Transliteration: "Yonkō no Shiro - Hōru Kēki Airando Tōchaku" (Japanese: 四皇の城 ホールケーキアイランド到着)	Directed by : Miho Hirayama; Storyboarded by : Tetsuya Endō	Atsuhiro Tomioka	May 28, 2017	September 6, 2026
791	9	"A Mysterious Forest Full of Candies! Luffy vs. Luffy?!"; Transliteration: "Okashi na Mori - Rufi tai Rufi!?" (Japanese: お菓子な森 ルフィVS(たい)ルフィ!?)	Kentarō Fujita	Tomohiro Nakayama	June 4, 2017	September 13, 2026
792	10	"Mom's Assassin! Luffy and the Seducing Woods!"; Transliteration: "Mamu no Shikaku - Rufi to Yūwaku no Mori!" (Japanese: マムの刺客 ルフィと誘惑の森！)	Yoshihiro Ueda	Shōji Yonemura	June 11, 2017	September 20, 2026
793	11	"A Seafaring Kingdom! Germa's King Judge!"; Transliteration: "Kaiyū Kokka - Jeruma no Ō Jajji" (Japanese: 海遊国家 ジェルマの王ジャッジ)	Katsumi Tokoro	Jin Tanaka	June 18, 2017	TBA
794	12	"A Battle Between Father and Son! Judge vs. Sanji!"; Transliteration: "Oyako Taiketsu - Jajji tai Sanji!" (Japanese: 父子対決 ジャッジVS(たい)サンジ！)	Directed by : Miho Shiraishi; Storyboarded by : Tetsuya Endō	Atsuhiro Tomioka	June 25, 2017	TBA
795	13	"A Giant Ambition! Big Mom and Caesar!"; Transliteration: "Kyodai na Yabō - Biggu Mamu to Shīzā" (Japanese: 巨大な野望 ビッグ・マムとシーザー)	Ryūji Yoshiike	Tomohiro Nakayama	July 2, 2017	TBA
796	14	"The Land of Souls! Mom's Fatal Ability!"; Transliteration: "Tamashii no Kuni - Mamu no Osorubeki Nōryoku!" (Japanese: 魂の国 マムの恐るべき能力！)	Satoshi Itō	Shōji Yonemura	July 9, 2017	TBA
797	15	"A Top Officer! The Sweet 3 General Cracker Appears!"; Transliteration: "Dai-Kanbu! San Shōsei Kurakkā Tōjō" (Japanese: 大幹部！三将星クラッカー登場)	Kentarō Fujita	Jin Tanaka	July 16, 2017	TBA
798	16	"An Enemy Worth 800 Million! Luffy vs. Thousand Armed Cracker!"; Transliteration: "Hachi-oku no Teki - Rufi tai Senju no Kurakkā" (Japanese: 8億の敵 ルフィVS(たい)千手のクラッカー)	Yoshihiro Ueda	Tomohiro Nakayama	July 23, 2017	TBA
799	17	"An All-out Duel! Fourth Gear vs. the Bis-Bis Ability!"; Transliteration: "Zenryoku Shōbu - Gia Fōsu tai Bisu-Bisu no Chikara" (Japanese: 全力勝負 ギア4(フォース)VS(たい)ビスビスの能力(ちから))	Directed by : Katsumi Tokoro; Storyboarded by : Kenji Yokoyama	Shōji Yonemura	July 30, 2017	TBA
800	18	"The First and the Second Join! The Vinsmoke Family"; Transliteration: "Ichi to Ni - Shūketsu! Vinsumōku-ke" (Japanese: 1と2 集結！ヴィンスモーク家)	Directed by : Yusuke Suzuki; Storyboarded by : Aya Komaki	Atsuhiro Tomioka	August 6, 2017	TBA
801	19	"The Benefactor's Life! Sanji and Owner Zeff!"; Transliteration: "Onjin no Inochi - Sanji to Ōnā Zefu" (Japanese: 恩人の命 サンジと料理長(オーナー)ゼフ)	Directed by : Yasunori Koyama; Storyboarded by : Tetsuya Endō	Jin Tanaka	August 13, 2017	TBA
802	20	"An Angry Sanji! The Secret of Germa 66!"; Transliteration: "Ikari no Sanji - Jeruma Daburu Shikkusu no Himitsu" (Japanese: 怒りのサンジ ジェルマ66(ダブルシックス)の秘密)	Directed by : Kentarō Fujita; Storyboarded by : Takayuki Tanaka	Tomohiro Nakayama	August 20, 2017	TBA
803	21	"The Past that He Let Go of! Vinsmoke Sanji!"; Transliteration: "Suteta Kako - Vinsumōku Sanji" (Japanese: 捨てた過去 ヴィンスモーク・サンジ)	Yoshihiro Ueda	Shōji Yonemura	August 27, 2017	TBA
804	22	"To the East Blue! Sanji's Resolute Departure!"; Transliteration: "Īsuto Burū e - Sanji Ketsui no Funade" (Japanese: 東の海(イーストブルー) へ サンジ決意の船出)	Satoshi Itō	Tomohiro Nakayama	September 3, 2017	TBA
805	23	"A Battle of Limits! Luffy and the Infinite Biscuits!"; Transliteration: "Genkai Shōbu - Rufi to Mugen Bisuketto" (Japanese: 限界勝負 ルフィと無限ビスケット)	Katsumi Tokoro	Atsuhiro Tomioka	September 17, 2017	TBA
806	24	"The Power of Satiety! A New Fourth Gear Form - Tank Man!"; Transliteration: "Manpuku no Chikara - Shin Gia Fōsu Tanku Man!" (Japanese: 満腹の力 新ギア4(フォース)タンクマン！)	Directed by : Miho Hirayama; Storyboarded by : Aya Komaki	Jin Tanaka	September 24, 2017	TBA
807	25	"A Heartbreaking Duel! Luffy vs. Sanji!"; Transliteration: "Kanashiki Kettō - Rufi tai Sanji" (Japanese: 哀しき決闘 ルフィVS(たい)サンジ)	Directed by : Takashi Ōtsuka; Storyboarded by : Yasunori Koyama	Shōji Yonemura	October 1, 2017 (Note: Episodes 807 and 808 originally aired together as a one-hour television special.)	TBA
808	26	"A Heartbreaking Duel! Luffy vs. Sanji!"; Transliteration: "Kanashiki Kettō - Rufi tai Sanji" (Japanese: 哀しき決闘 ルフィVS(たい)サンジ)	Takashi Ōtsuka	Shōji Yonemura	October 1, 2017	TBA
809	27	"A Storm of Revenge! An Enraged Army Comes to Attack!"; Transliteration: "Fukushū no Arashi - Ikari no Gundan Shūrai!" (Japanese: 復讐の嵐 怒りの軍団襲来！)	Directed by : Yusuke Suzuki; Storyboarded by : Tetsuya Endō	Tomohiro Nakayama	October 15, 2017	TBA
810	28	"The End of the Adventure! Sanji's Resolute Proposal!"; Transliteration: "Bōken no Owari - Sanji Ketsui no Puropōzu" (Japanese: 冒険の終わり サンジ決意のプロポーズ)	Directed by : Kentarō Fujita; Storyboarded by : Aya Komaki	Jin Tanaka	October 22, 2017	TBA
811	29	"I'll Wait Here! Luffy vs. the Enraged Army!"; Transliteration: "Koko de Matsu - Rufi tai Ikari no Gundan" (Japanese: ここで待つ ルフィVS(たい)怒りの軍団)	Directed by : Yasunori Koyama; Storyboarded by : Masahiro Hosoda	Atsuhiro Tomioka	October 29, 2017	TBA
812	30	"Invading the Chateau! Reach the Road Poneglyph!"; Transliteration: "Shatō Sen'nyū - Ubae! Rōdo Pōnegurifu" (Japanese: 城内(シャトー)潜入 奪え！ロード歴史の本文(ポーネグリフ))	Yoshihiro Ueda	Shōji Yonemura	November 5, 2017	TBA
813	31	"A Fateful Confrontation! Luffy and Big Mom!"; Transliteration: "Innen no Taimen - Rufi to Biggu Mamu!" (Japanese: 因縁の対面 ルフィとビッグ・マム！)	Katsumi Tokoro	Tomohiro Nakayama	November 12, 2017	TBA
814	32	"Shout of the Soul! Brook & Pedro's Lightning Operation!"; Transliteration: "Tyamasī no Sakebi - Burukku ando Pedoro Dengeki Sakusen" (Japanese: 魂(テャマスィー)の叫び ブルック&ペドロ電撃作戦)	Satoshi Itō	Jin Tanaka	November 19, 2017	TBA
815	33	"Goodbye! Pudding's Tearful Determination!"; Transliteration: "Sayonara - Purin Namida no Ketsui" (Japanese: さよなら プリン涙の決意)	Directed by : Yusuke Suzuki; Storyboarded by : Aya Komaki	Shōji Yonemura	November 26, 2017	TBA
816	34	"The History of the Left Eye! Pedro vs. Baron Tamago!"; Transliteration: "Hidarime no Innen - Pedoro tai Tamago Danshaku" (Japanese: 左眼の因縁 ペドロVS(たい)タマゴ男爵)	Masahiro Hosoda	Atsuhiro Tomioka	December 3, 2017	TBA
817	35	"Moist Cigarette! The Night Before Sanji's Wedding!"; Transliteration: "Shikemoku - Sanji no Kekkon Zen'ya" (Japanese: シケモク サンジの結婚前夜)	Miho Hirayama	Shōji Yonemura	December 10, 2017	TBA
818	36	"The Undaunted Soul! Brook vs. Big Mom!"; Transliteration: "Fukutsu no Souru - Burukku tai Biggu Mamu" (Japanese: 不屈の魂(ソウル) ブルックVS(たい)ビック・マム)	Directed by : Kentarō Fujita; Storyboarded by : Tetsuya Endō	Tomohiro Nakayama	December 17, 2017	TBA
819	37	"Sora's Wish! Germa's Failure - Sanji!"; Transliteration: "Sora no Negai - Jeruma no Shippaisaku Sanji" (Japanese: 母(ソラ)の願い ジェルマの失敗作サンジ)	Yoshihiro Ueda	Jin Tanaka	December 24, 2017	TBA
820	38	"To Reach Sanji! Luffy's Vengeful Hell-bent Dash!"; Transliteration: "Sanji no Moto e - Rufi Gyakushū no Dai Gekisō!" (Japanese: サンジの元へ ルフィ逆襲の大激走！)	Yasunori Koyama	Shōji Yonemura	January 7, 2018	TBA
821	39	"The Chateau in Turmoil! Luffy, to the Rendezvous!"; Transliteration: "Shatō Dōran - Rufi Yakusoku no Basho e" (Japanese: 城内(シャトー)動乱 ルフィ約束の場所へ)	Directed by : Yusuke Suzuki; Storyboarded by : Tetsuya Endō	Tomohiro Nakayama	January 14, 2018	TBA
822	40	"Deciding to Say Goodbye! Sanji and his Straw-Hat Bento!"; Transliteration: "Wakare no Ketsui - Sanji to Mugiwara Bentō" (Japanese: 別れの決意 サンジと麦わら弁当)	Kentarō Fujita	Jin Tanaka	January 21, 2018	TBA
823	41	"The Emperor Rolls Over! Rescue Brook Mission!"; Transliteration: "Yonko no Negaeri - Burukku Kyūshutsu Dai-Sakusen!" (Japanese: 四皇の寝返り ブルック救出大作戦！)	Hiroyuki Satō	Atsuhiro Tomioka	January 28, 2018	TBA
824	42	"The Rendezvous! Luffy, a One-on-One at His Limit!"; Transliteration: "Yakusoku no Basho - Rufi Genkai no Ikkiuchi" (Japanese: 約束の場所 ルフィ限界の一騎打ち)	Aya Komaki	Shōji Yonemura	February 4, 2018	TBA
825	43	"A Liar! Luffy and Sanji!!"; Transliteration: "Usotsuki - Rufi to Sanji" (Japanese: ウソつき ルフィとサンジ)	Satoshi Itō	Shōji Yonemura	February 11, 2018	TBA
826	44	"Sanji Comes Back! Crash! The Tea Party from Hell!"; Transliteration: "Sanji Fukkatsu - Kowase! Jigoku no Ochakai" (Japanese: サンジ復活 壊せ！地獄のお茶会)	Katsumi Tokoro	Tomohiro Nakayama	February 18, 2018	TBA
827	45	"A Secret Meeting! Luffy vs. the Fire Tank Pirates!"; Transliteration: "Mikkai! Rufi tai Faia Tanku Kaizoku-dan" (Japanese: 密会！ルフィVS(たい)ファイアタンク海賊団)	Yoshihiro Ueda	Kisa Miura	March 4, 2018	TBA
828	46	"The Deadly Pact! Luffy & Bege's Allied Forces!"; Transliteration: "Shi no Kyōtei - Rufi ando Bejji Rengō-gun!" (Japanese: 死の協定 ルフィ&ベッジ連合軍！)	Masahiro Hosoda	Jin Tanaka	March 18, 2018	TBA
829	47	"Luffy Engages in a Secret Maneuver! The Wedding Full of Conspiracies Starts Soon!"; Transliteration: "Rufi An'yaku - Kaien Chokuzen! Inbō no Kekkonshiki" (Japanese: ルフィ暗躍 開演直前！陰謀の結婚式)	Yasunori Koyama	Shōji Yonemura	March 25, 2018	TBA
830	48	"The Family Gets Together! The Hellish Tea Party Starts!"; Transliteration: "Famirī Shūketsu - Kaien! Jigoku no Ochakai" (Japanese: 家族(ファミリー)集結 開宴！地獄のお茶会)	Aya Komaki	Tomohiro Nakayama	April 1, 2018	TBA
831	49	"The Broken Couple! Sanji and Pudding Enter!"; Transliteration: "Kamen Fūfu - Sanji ♡ Purin Nyūjō!" (Japanese: 仮面夫婦 サンジ♡プリン入場！)	Yusuke Suzuki	Kisa Miura	April 8, 2018	TBA
832	50	"A Deadly Kiss! The Mission to Assassinate the Emperor Kicks Off!"; Transliteration: "Shi no Kisu - Yonkō Ansatsu Sakusen Kaishi!" (Japanese: 死のキス 四皇暗殺作戦開始！)	Yoshihiro Ueda	Jin Tanaka	April 15, 2018	TBA
833	51	"Returning the Sake Cup! The Manly Jimbei Pays His Debt!"; Transliteration: "Sakazuki Henjō! Otoko Jinbē no Otoshimae" (Japanese: 盃返上！侠客(おとこ)ジンベエの落とし前)	Hiroyuki Satō	Tomohiro Nakayama	April 22, 2018	TBA
834	52	"The Mission Failed?! The Big Mom Pirates Strike Back!"; Transliteration: "Sakusen Shippai!? Hangeki no Biggu Mamu Kaizoku-dan" (Japanese: 作戦失敗!? 反撃のビッグ・マム海賊団)	Satoshi Itō	Shōji Yonemura	April 29, 2018	TBA
835	53	"Run, Sanji - SOS! Germa 66!"; Transliteration: "Hashire Sanji - Esu-Ō-Esu! Jeruma Daburu Shikkusu" (Japanese: 走れサンジ SOS！ジェルマ66(ダブルシックス))	Katsumi Tokoro	Kisa Miura	May 6, 2018	TBA
836	54	"Mom's Secret! The Giant's Island Elbaph and a Little Monster!"; Transliteration: "Mamu no Himitsu - Erubafu to Chīsana Kaibutsu" (Japanese: マムの秘密 巨人の島(エルバフ)と小さな怪物)	Yutaka Nakashima	Atsuhiro Tomioka	May 13, 2018	TBA
837	55	"The Birth of Mom! The Day That Carmel Vanished!"; Transliteration: "Mamu Tanjō - Karumeru ga Kieta Hi" (Japanese: マム誕生 カルメルが消えた日)	Masahiro Hosoda	Jin Tanaka	May 20, 2018	TBA
838	56	"The Launcher Blasts! The Moment of Big Mom's Assassination!"; Transliteration: "Ranchā Sakuretsu! Biggu Mamu Ansatsu no Toki" (Japanese: 兵器(ランチャー)炸裂！ビッグ・マム暗殺の瞬(と)間(き))	Yoshihiro Ueda	Tomohiro Nakayama	May 27, 2018	TBA
839	57	"The Evil Army - Transform! Germa 66!"; Transliteration: "Aku no Gundan - Henshin! Jeruma Daburu Shikkusu" (Japanese: 悪の軍団 変身！ジェルマ66(ダブルシックス))	Aya Komaki	Shōji Yonemura	June 3, 2018	TBA
840	58	"Cutting the Father-Son Relationship! Sanji and Judge!"; Transliteration: "Oyako no Ketsubetsu - Sanji to Jajji" (Japanese: 父子(おやこ)の訣別 サンジとジャッジ)	Yutaka Nakashima	Atsuhiro Tomioka	June 10, 2018	TBA
841	59	"Escape From the Tea Party! Luffy vs. Big Mom!"; Transliteration: "Chakai Dasshutsu! Rufi tai Biggu Mamu" (Japanese: 茶会脱出！ルフィVS(たい)ビッグ・マム)	Kōhei Kureta	Kisa Miura	June 17, 2018	TBA
842	60	"The Execution Begins! Luffy's Allied Forces Are Annihilated?!"; Transliteration: "Shokei Kaishi - Rufi Rengō-gun Zenmetsu!?" (Japanese: 処刑開始 ルフィ連合軍全滅!?)	Yusuke Suzuki	Jin Tanaka	June 24, 2018	TBA
843	61	"The Chateau Collapses! The Straw Hat's Great Escape Begins!"; Transliteration: "Shatō Hōkai - Mugiwara Ichimi Dai Dassō Sutāto!" (Japanese: 巨城(シャトー)崩壞 麦わら一味大脱走開始(スタート)！)	Takahiro Imamura	Tomohiro Nakayama	July 1, 2018	TBA
844	62	"The Spear of Elbaph - Onslaught! The Flying Big Mom!"; Transliteration: "Erubafu no Yari - Kyōshū! Sora Kakeru Biggu Mamu" (Japanese: 巨人(エルバフ)の槍 強襲！空翔るビッグ・マム)	Satoshi Itō	Shōji Yonemura	July 8, 2018	TBA
845	63	"Pudding's Determination - Ablaze! The Seducing Woods!"; Transliteration: "Purin no Ketsui - Dai Enjō! Yūwaku no Mori" (Japanese: プリンの決意 大炎上！誘惑の森)	Yoshihiro Ueda	Atsuhiro Tomioka	July 15, 2018	TBA
846	64	"A Lightning Counterattack! Nami and Zeus the Thundercloud!"; Transliteration: "Hangeki no Ikazuchi - Nami to Raiun Zeusu!" (Japanese: 反撃の雷 ナミと雷雲ゼウス！)	Yutaka Nakashima	Jin Tanaka	July 22, 2018	TBA
847	65	"A Coincidental Reunion! Sanji and the Lovestruck Evil Pudding!"; Transliteration: "Gūzen no Saikai - Sanji to Koisuru Waru Purin" (Japanese: 偶然の再会 サンジと恋する悪プリン)	Masahiro Hosoda	Kisa Miura	July 29, 2018	TBA
848	66	"Save the Sunny - Fighting Bravely! Chopper & Brook!"; Transliteration: "Sanī o Mamore - Funsen! Choppā ando Burukku" (Japanese: サニーを守れ 奮戦！チョッパー&ブルック)	Hiroyuki Satō	Tomohiro Nakayama	August 5, 2018	TBA
849	67	"Before the Dawn! Pedro, Captain of the Guardians!"; Transliteration: "Yoake Mae - Gādianzu Danchō Pedoro" (Japanese: 夜明け前 侠客団(ガーディアンズ)団長ペドロ)	Katsumi Tokoro	Shōji Yonemura	August 12, 2018	TBA
850	68	"I'll Be Back! Luffy, Deadly Departure!"; Transliteration: "Kanarazu Modoru - Rufi Inochigake no Shukkō!" (Japanese: 必ず戻る ルフィ命がけの出航！)	Ryota Nakamura	Atsuhiro Tomioka	August 19, 2018	TBA
851	69	"The Man with a Bounty of Billion! The Strongest Sweet General, Katakuri!"; Transliteration: "Jū-oku no Otoko - Saikyō no San Shōsei Katakuri" (Japanese: 10億の男 最強の3将星カタクリ)	Kōhei Kureta	Jin Tanaka	August 26, 2018	TBA
852	70	"A Hard Battle Starts! Luffy vs. Katakuri!"; Transliteration: "Gekitō Kaimaku - Rufi tai Katakuri" (Japanese: 激闘開幕 ルフィVS(たい)カタクリ)	Aya Komaki	Shōji Yonemura	September 2, 2018	TBA
853	71	"The Green Room! An Invincible Helmsman, Jimbei!"; Transliteration: "Gurīn Rūmu - Muteki no Sōdashu Jinbē" (Japanese: 波の部屋(グリーンルーム) 無敵の操舵手ジンベエ)	Yoshihiro Ueda	Kisa Miura	September 16, 2018	TBA
854	72	"The Threat of the Mole! Luffy's Silent Fight!"; Transliteration: "Mogura no Kyōi - Rufi Chinmoku no Tatakai!" (Japanese: 土竜(モグラ)の脅威 ルフィ沈黙の戦い！)	Satoshi Itō	Tomohiro Nakayama	September 23, 2018	TBA
855	73	"The End of the Deadly Battle?! Katakuri's Awakening in Anger!"; Transliteration: "Shitō Ketchaku!? Katakuri Ikari no Kakusei" (Japanese: 死闘決着!? カタクリ怒りの覚醒)	Directed by : Yusuke Suzuki; Storyboarded by : Yutaka Nakashima	Atsuhiro Tomioka	September 30, 2018	TBA
856	74	"The Forbidden Secret! Katakuri's Merienda!"; Transliteration: "Kindan no Himitsu - Katakuri no Merienda" (Japanese: 禁断の秘密 カタクリのおやつの時間(メリエンダ))	Toshinori Fukuzawa	Jin Tanaka	October 7, 2018	TBA
857	75	"Luffy Fights Back! The Invincible Katakuri's Weak Point!"; Transliteration: "Rufi Hangeki - Muteki Katakuri no Jakuten!" (Japanese: ルフィ反撃 無敵カタクリの弱点！)	Yasunori Koyama	Shōji Yonemura	October 14, 2018	TBA
858	76	"Another Crisis! Fourth Gear vs. Unstoppable Donuts!"; Transliteration: "Pinchi Futatabi! Gia Fōsu tai Musō Dōnatsu" (Japanese: 危機(ピンチ)再び！ギア4(フォース)VS(たい)無双ドーナツ)	Takahiro Imamura	Kisa Miura	October 21, 2018	TBA
859	77	"The Rebellious Daughter, Chiffon! Sanji's Big Plan for Transporting the Cake!"; Transliteration: "Hangyaku no Shifon - Sanji no Kēki Yusō Dai Sakusen" (Japanese: 反逆の娘(シフォン) サンジのケーキ輸送大作戦)	Directed by : Yusuke Suzuki; Storyboarded by : Masahiro Hosoda	Tomohiro Nakayama	October 28, 2018	TBA
860	78	"A Man's Way of Life! Bege and Luffy's Determination as Captains!"; Transliteration: "Otoko no Ikizama - Bejji to Rufi Senchō no Ketsui" (Japanese: 男の生き様 ベッジとルフィ船長の決意)	Aya Komaki	Atsuhiro Tomioka	November 4, 2018	TBA
861	79	"The Cake Sank?! Sanji & Bege's Getaway Battle!"; Transliteration: "Kēki Chinbotsu!? Sanji ando Bejji Tōbō-sen" (Japanese: ケーキ沈没!? サンジ&ベッジ逃亡戦)	Katsumi Tokoro	Jin Tanaka	November 11, 2018	TBA
862	80	"Sulong! Carrot's Big Mystic Transformation!"; Transliteration: "Sūron - Kyarotto Shinpi no Dai Henshin" (Japanese: 月の獅子(スーロン) キャロット神秘の大変身)	Hiroyuki Satō	Shōji Yonemura	November 18, 2018	TBA
863	81	"Break Through! The Straw Hat's Mighty Sea Battle!"; Transliteration: "Toppa Seyo - Mugiwara no Ichimi Dai Kaisen!" (Japanese: 突破せよ 麦わらの一味大海戦！)	Yoshihiro Ueda	Kisa Miura	November 25, 2018	TBA
864	82	"Finally, They Clash! The Emperor of the Sea vs. Straw Hats!"; Transliteration: "Tsui ni Gekitotsu - Yonkō tai Mugiwara no Ichimi" (Japanese: 遂に激突 四皇VS(たい)麦わらの一味)	Yutaka Nakashima	Tomohiro Nakayama	December 9, 2018	TBA
865	83	"Dark King's Direct Precepts! The Battle Against Katakuri Turns Around!"; Transliteration: "Meiō Jikiden - Katakuri-sen Dai Gyakuten Kaishi" (Japanese: 冥王直伝 カタクリ戦大逆転開始)	Yusuke Suzuki & Yasunori Koyama	Jin Tanaka	December 16, 2018	TBA
866	84	"Finally He Returns! Sanji, the Man Who'll Stop the Emperor of the Sea!"; Transliteration: "Tsui ni Kikan - Yonkō o Tomeru Otoko Sanji" (Japanese: 遂に帰還 四皇を止める男サンジ)	Yoshihiro Ueda	Shōji Yonemura	December 23, 2018	TBA
867	85	"Lurking in the Darkness! An Assassin Targeting Luffy!"; Transliteration: "Yami ni Hisomu - Rufi o Osou Ansatsusha!" (Japanese: 闇に潜む ルフィを襲う暗殺者！)	Masahiro Hosoda	Kisa Miura	January 6, 2019	TBA
868	86	"One Man's Determination! Katakuri's Deadly Big Fight!"; Transliteration: "Otoko no Kakugo - Katakuri Inochigake Ōshōbu" (Japanese: 男の覚悟 カタクリ命がけ大勝負)	Aya Komaki	Tomohiro Nakayama	January 13, 2019	TBA
869	87	"Wake Up! The Power of Observation Able to Top the Strongest!"; Transliteration: "Mezamero - Saikyō o Koeru Kenbun-shoku!" (Japanese: 目覚めろ 最強を越える見聞色！)	Katsumi Tokoro	Jin Tanaka	January 20, 2019	TBA
870	88	"A Fist of Divine Speed! Another Fourth Gear Application Activated!"; Transliteration: "Shinsoku no Ken - Aratanaru Gia Fōsu Hatsudō!" (Japanese: 神速の拳 新たなるギア4(フォース)発動！)	Kōhei Kureta	Shōji Yonemura	January 27, 2019	TBA
871	89	"Finally, It's Over! The Climax of the Intense Fight Against Katakuri!"; Transliteration: "Tsuini Shūketsu - Sōzetsu Katakuri-sen no Yukue" (Japanese: 遂に終結 壮絶カタクリ戦の行方)	Yutaka Nakashima	Tomohiro Nakayama	February 3, 2019	TBA
872	90	"A Desperate Situation! The Iron-Tight Entrapment of Luffy!"; Transliteration: "Zettai Zetsumei - Teppeki no Rufi Hōimō!" (Japanese: 絶体絶命 鉄壁のルフィ包囲網！)	Directed by : Yoshihiro Ueda; Storyboarded by : Takahiro Imamura	Jin Tanaka	February 10, 2019	TBA
873	91	"Pulling Back from the Brink! The Formidable Reinforcements - Germa!"; Transliteration: "Kishi Kaisei - Saikyō no Engun Jeruma!" (Japanese: 起死回生 最強の援軍ジェルマ！)	Satoshi Itō	Shōji Yonemura	February 17, 2019	TBA
874	92	"The Last Hope! The Sun Pirates Emerge!"; Transliteration: "Saigo no Toride - Taiyō no Kaizoku-dan Arawaru" (Japanese: 最後の砦 タイヨウの海賊団現る)	Yoshihiro Ueda	Tomohiro Nakayama	February 24, 2019	TBA
875	93	"A Captivating Flavor! Sanji's Cake of Happiness!"; Transliteration: "Miwaku no Aji - Shiawase no Sanji no Kēki" (Japanese: 魅惑の味 幸せのサンジのケーキ)	Aya Komaki	Jin Tanaka	March 3, 2019	TBA
876	94	"The Man of Humanity and Justice! Jimbei, a Desperate Massive Ocean Current"; Transliteration: "Jingi no Otoko - Jinbē Kesshi no Daikairyū" (Japanese: 仁義の漢 ジンベエ決死の大海流)	Masahiro Hosoda	Tomohiro Nakayama	March 17, 2019	TBA
877	95	"The Parting Time! Pudding's Last Wish!"; Transliteration: "Sekibetsu no Toki - Purin Saigo no "Onegai"" (Japanese: 惜別の時 プリン最後の〝お願い〟)	Toshinori Fukuzawa	Shōji Yonemura	March 24, 2019	TBA
Whole Cake Island Epilogue (Reverie / Levely) (Note: Different sources use differing romanizations of レヴェリー (Reverī). All official English translations of One Piece use "Reverie", whereas the Japanese version uses "Levely" when it is rendered in Latin script.)
878	96	"The World Is Stunned! The Fifth Emperor of the Sea Emerges!"; Transliteration: "Sekai Kyōgaku - Dai Go no Umi no Kōtei Arawaru!" (Japanese: 世界驚愕 第五の海の皇帝現る！)	Yutaka Nakashima	Shōji Yonemura	March 31, 2019	TBA
879	97	"To the Reverie! The Straw Hats' Sworn Allies Come Together!"; Transliteration: "Reverī e - Shūketsu! Mugiwara no Meiyū-tachi" (Japanese: 世界会議(レヴェリー)へ 集結！麦わらの盟友達)	Yoshihiro Ueda	Jin Tanaka	April 7, 2019	TBA
880	98	"Sabo Goes into Action! All the Captains of the Revolutionary Army Appear!"; Transliteration: "Sabo Ugoku - Kakumei-gun Zen Guntaichō Tōjō!" (Japanese: サボ動く 革命軍全軍隊長登場！)	Hiroyuki Sato	Tomohiro Nakayama	April 14, 2019	TBA
881	99	"Going into Action! The Implacable New Admiral of the Fleet - Sakazuki!"; Transliteration: "Ugokidasu - Shūnen no Shin Gensui Sakazuki" (Japanese: 動き出す 執念の新元帥サカズキ)	Yusuke Suzuki	Atsuhiro Tomioka	April 21, 2019	TBA
882	100	"The War of the Best! The Inherited Will of the King of the Pirates!"; Transliteration: "Chōjō Sensō - Tsuga-reta Kaizoku-ō no Ishi" (Japanese: 頂上戦争 継がれた海賊王の意思)	Satoshi Ito	Atsuhiro Tomioka	April 28, 2019	TBA
883	101	"One Step Forward for Her Dream! Shirahoshi Goes Out in the Sun!"; Transliteration: "Yume no Ippo - Shirahoshi Taiyō no Moto e!" (Japanese: 夢の一歩 しらほし太陽の下へ！)	Katsumi Tokoro	Shōji Yonemura	May 5, 2019	TBA
884	102	"I Miss Him! Vivi and Rebecca's Sentiments!"; Transliteration: "Aitai - Bibi to Rebekka no Omoi" (Japanese: 会いたい ビビとレベッカの想い)	Yutaka Nakashima	Tomohiro Nakayama	May 12, 2019	TBA
885	103	"In the Dark Recesses of the Holyland! A Mysterious Giant Straw Hat!"; Transliteration: "Seichi no Yami - Nazo no Kyodaina Mugiwara-bōshi" (Japanese: 聖地の闇 謎の巨大な麦わら帽子)	Yoshihiro Ueda	Jin Tanaka	May 19, 2019	TBA
886	104	"The Holyland in Tumult! The Targeted Princess Shirahoshi!"; Transliteration: "Seichi Sōzen - Nerawa-reta Shirahoshi-hime!" (Japanese: 聖地騒然 狙われたしらほし姫！)	Masahiro Hosoda	Atsuhiro Tomioka	May 26, 2019	TBA
887	105	"An Explosive Situation! Two Emperors of the Sea Going After Luffy!"; Transliteration: "Isshoku Sokuhatsu - Rufi Nerau Futari no Yonkō" (Japanese: 一触即発 ルフィ狙う二人の四皇)	Yutaka Nakashima	Shōji Yonemura	June 2, 2019	TBA
888	106	"Sabo Enraged! The Tragedy of the Revolutionary Army Officer Kuma!"; Transliteration: "Sabo Ikaru - Kakumei-gun Kanbu Kuma no Higeki" (Japanese: サボ怒る 革命軍幹部くまの悲劇)	Katsumi Tokoro	Tomohiro Nakayama	June 9, 2019	TBA
889	107	"Finally, It Starts! The Conspiracy-filled Reverie!"; Transliteration: "Tsui ni Kaimaku - Inbō Uzumaku Reverī!" (Japanese: 遂に開幕 陰謀渦巻く世界会議(レヴェリー)！)	Yoshihiro Ueda	Jin Tanaka	June 16, 2019	TBA
Prologue to Wano
890	108	"Marco! The Keeper of Whitebeard's Last Memento!"; Transliteration: "Maruko! Shirohige no Katami no Shugosha" (Japanese: マルコ！白ひげの形見の守護者)	Yusuke Suzuki	Atsuhiro Tomioka	June 23, 2019	TBA
891	109	"Climbing Up a Waterfall! A Great Journey Through the Land of Wano's Sea Zone!"; Transliteration: "Takinobori! Wano Kuni no Kaiiki Dai-kōkai!" (Japanese: 滝登り！ワノ国の海域大航海！)	Toshinori Fukuzawa	Tomohiro Nakayama	June 30, 2019	TBA

== Home media releases ==
=== Japanese ===
Season 16 onward, including the Film Z and Film Gold tie-in episodes, were released on both DVD and Blu-ray. The Log Collections were released on DVD only.

Avex Pictures (Japan – Region 2/A)
Volume		Episodes	Release date	Ref.
15thシーズン 魚人島編	piece.01	517–520	December 5, 2012	
15thシーズン 魚人島編	piece.02	521–524	January 9, 2013	
15thシーズン 魚人島編	piece.03	525–528	February 6, 2013	
15thシーズン 魚人島編	piece.04	529–532	March 6, 2013	
15thシーズン 魚人島編	piece.05	533–536	April 3, 2013	
15thシーズン 魚人島編	piece.06	537–540	May 8, 2013	
15thシーズン 魚人島編	piece.07	541, 543–545	June 5, 2013	
15thシーズン 魚人島編	piece.08	546–549	July 3, 2013	
15thシーズン 魚人島編	piece.09	550–553	August 7, 2013	
15thシーズン 魚人島編	piece.10	554–557	September 4, 2013	
15thシーズン 魚人島編	piece.11	558–561	October 2, 2013	
15thシーズン 魚人島編	piece.12	562–565	November 6, 2013	
15thシーズン 魚人島編	piece.13	566–569	December 4, 2013	
15thシーズン 魚人島編	piece.14	570–574	December 4, 2013	
16THシーズン パンクハザード編	piece.01	579–582	January 8, 2014	
16THシーズン パンクハザード編	piece.02	583–586	January 8, 2014	
16THシーズン パンクハザード編	piece.03	587–589, 591	February 5, 2014	
16THシーズン パンクハザード編	piece.04	592–595	February 5, 2014	
16THシーズン パンクハザード編	piece.05	596–599	March 5, 2014	
16THシーズン パンクハザード編	piece.06	600–603	March 5, 2014	
16THシーズン パンクハザード編	piece.07	604–607	April 2, 2014	
16THシーズン パンクハザード編	piece.08	608–611	April 2, 2014	
16THシーズン パンクハザード編	piece.09	612–615	May 14, 2014	
16THシーズン パンクハザード編	piece.10	616–619	May 14, 2014	
16THシーズン パンクハザード編	piece.11	620–623	June 4, 2014	
16THシーズン パンクハザード編	piece.12	624–628	June 4, 2014	
17thシーズン ドレスローザ編	piece.01	629–632	July 2, 2014	
17thシーズン ドレスローザ編	piece.02	633–636	August 6, 2014	
17thシーズン ドレスローザ編	piece.03	637–640	September 3, 2014	
17thシーズン ドレスローザ編	piece.04	641–644	October 1, 2014	
17thシーズン ドレスローザ編	piece.05	645–648	November 5, 2014	
17thシーズン ドレスローザ編	piece.06	649–652	December 3, 2014	
17thシーズン ドレスローザ編	piece.07	653–656	January 7, 2015	
17thシーズン ドレスローザ編	piece 08.	657–660	February 4, 2015	
17thシーズン ドレスローザ編	piece.09	661–664	March 4, 2015	
17thシーズン ドレスローザ編	piece.10	665–668	April 1, 2015	
17thシーズン ドレスローザ編	piece.11	669–671	May 8, 2015	
17thシーズン ドレスローザ編	piece.12	673–676	June 3, 2015	
17thシーズン ドレスローザ編	piece.13	677–680	July 1, 2015	
17thシーズン ドレスローザ編	piece.14	681–684	August 5, 2015	
17thシーズン ドレスローザ編	piece.15	685–688	September 2, 2015	
17thシーズン ドレスローザ編	piece.16	689–692	October 27, 2015	
17thシーズン ドレスローザ編	piece.17	693–696	November 4, 2015	
17thシーズン ドレスローザ編	piece.18	697–700	December 4, 2015	
17thシーズン ドレスローザ編	piece.19	701–704	January 6, 2016	
17thシーズン ドレスローザ編	piece.20	705–708	February 3, 2016	
17thシーズン ドレスローザ編	piece.21	709–712	March 2, 2016	
17thシーズン ドレスローザ編	piece.22	713–716	April 6, 2016	
17thシーズン ドレスローザ編	piece.23	717–720	May 11, 2016	
17thシーズン ドレスローザ編	piece.24	721–724	June 1, 2016	
17thシーズン ドレスローザ編	piece.25	725–728	July 6, 2016	
17thシーズン ドレスローザ編	piece.26	729–732	August 3, 2016	
17thシーズン ドレスローザ編	piece.27	733–736	September 7, 2016	
17thシーズン ドレスローザ編	piece.28	737–740	October 5, 2016	
17thシーズン ドレスローザ編	piece.29	741–743	November 2, 2016	
17thシーズン ドレスローザ編	piece.30	744–746	December 7, 2016	
18thシーズン ドレスローザ編	piece.01	751–754	January 11, 2017	
18thシーズン ドレスローザ編	piece.02	755–758	February 1, 2017	
18thシーズン ドレスローザ編	piece.03	759–762	March 1, 2017	
18thシーズン ドレスローザ編	piece.04	763–766	April 5, 2017	
18thシーズン ドレスローザ編	piece.05	767–770	May 3, 2017	
18thシーズン ドレスローザ編	piece.06	771–774	June 7, 2017	
18thシーズン ドレスローザ編	piece.07	775–778	July 5, 2017	
18thシーズン ドレスローザ編	piece.08	779–782	August 2, 2017	
19thシーズン ドレスローザ編	piece.01	783–786	September 6, 2017	
19thシーズン ドレスローザ編	piece.02	787–790	October 4, 2017	
19thシーズン ドレスローザ編	piece.03	791–794	November 1, 2017	
19thシーズン ドレスローザ編	piece.04	795–798	December 6, 2017	
19thシーズン ドレスローザ編	piece.05	799–802	January 10, 2018	
19thシーズン ドレスローザ編	piece.06	803–806	February 7, 2018	
19thシーズン ドレスローザ編	piece.07	807–810	March 7, 2018	
19thシーズン ドレスローザ編	piece.08	811–814	April 4, 2018	
19thシーズン ドレスローザ編	piece.09	815–818	May 2, 2018	
19thシーズン ドレスローザ編	piece.10	819–822	June 6, 2018	
19thシーズン ドレスローザ編	piece.11	824–826	July 4, 2018	
19thシーズン ドレスローザ編	piece.12	827–830	August 1, 2018	
19thシーズン ドレスローザ編	piece.13	831–834	September 5, 2018	
19thシーズン ドレスローザ編	piece.14	835–838	October 3, 2018	
19thシーズン ドレスローザ編	piece.15	839–842	November 7, 2018	
19thシーズン ドレスローザ編	piece.16	843–846	December 5, 2018	
19thシーズン ドレスローザ編	piece.17	847–850	January 9, 2019	
19thシーズン ドレスローザ編	piece.18	851–854	February 6, 2019	
19thシーズン ドレスローザ編	piece.19	855–858	March 6, 2019	
19thシーズン ドレスローザ編	piece.20	859–862	April 3, 2019	
19thシーズン ドレスローザ編	piece.21	863–866	May 8, 2019	
19thシーズン ドレスローザ編	piece.22	867–870	June 5, 2019	
19thシーズン ドレスローザ編	piece.23	871–874	July 3, 2019	
19thシーズン ドレスローザ編	piece.24	875–878	August 7, 2019	
19thシーズン ドレスローザ編	piece.25	879–882	September 4, 2019	
19thシーズン ドレスローザ編	piece.26	883–885	October 2, 2019	
19thシーズン ドレスローザ編	piece.27	886–888	November 6, 2019	
19thシーズン ドレスローザ編	piece.28	889–891	December 4, 2019	
トリコ×ワンピース コラボスペシャル完全版		492, 542	October 26, 2012	
ONE PIECE FILM Z 連動特別編 Zの野望		575–578	May 24, 2013	
ONE PIECE FILM GOLD映画連動特別編 シルバーマイン		747–750	December 28, 2016	
ONE PIECE Log Collection	"FISHMAN ISLAND"	517–535	August 28, 2015	
ONE PIECE Log Collection	"SHIRAHOSHI"	536–554	September 25, 2015	
ONE PIECE Log Collection	"NOAH"	555–573	December 25, 2015	
ONE PIECE Log Collection	"PUNK HAZARD"	574, 579–589, 591–594	July 22, 2016	
ONE PIECE Log Collection	"LABORATORY"	595–611	August 26, 2016	
ONE PIECE Log Collection	"CAESAR CLOWN"	612–628	September 23, 2016	
ONE PIECE Log Collection	"DRESSROSA"	629–644	July 28, 2017	
ONE PIECE Log Collection	"COLOSSEUM"	645–661	August 25, 2017	
ONE PIECE Log Collection	"SOP"	662–678	December 22, 2017	
ONE PIECE Log Collection	"SABO"	679–695	January 26, 2018	
ONE PIECE Log Collection	"CORAZON"	696–708	July 27, 2018	
ONE PIECE Log Collection	"BIRDCAGE"	709–720	July 27, 2018	
ONE PIECE Log Collection	"DOFLAMINGO"	721–733	August 24, 2018	
ONE PIECE Log Collection	"FUJITORA"	734–746	September 28, 2018	
ONE PIECE Log Collection	"ZOU"	751–760	July 26, 2019	
ONE PIECE Log Collection	"MINK"	761–771	August 30, 2019	
ONE PIECE Log Collection	"JACK"	772–782	September 27, 2019	
ONE PIECE Log Collection	"WHOLE CAKE ISLAND"	783–796	June 26, 2020	
ONE PIECE Log Collection	"GERMA"	797–809	July 31, 2020	
ONE PIECE Log Collection	"PUDDING"	810–822	August 8, 2020	
ONE PIECE Log Collection	"WEDDING"	823–835	September 25, 2020	
ONE PIECE Log Collection	"BIG MOM"	836–849	June 21, 2021	
ONE PIECE Log Collection	"KATAKURI"	850–863	July 30, 2021	
ONE PIECE Log Collection	"SNAKEMAN"	864–877	August 27, 2021	
ONE PIECE Log Collection	"LEVELY"	878–891	September 24, 2021	

=== English ===
In Australia, the Season releases were renamed Collection 43 through 48.

Seasons Nine and Ten, and Collections 22 to 25, were released on DVD only. Beginning with Season Eleven, and half of Collection 26, (Note: Collection 26 contains 27 episodes on DVD, but only 13 episodes on the bundled Blu-rays.) the series began to be released in DVD and Blu-ray combo packs.

Crunchyroll LLC (North America – Region 1/A); Crunchyroll UK and Ireland (UK and Ireland - Region 2/B); Madman Entertainment (Australia and New Zealand – Region 4/B)
Volume		Episodes	Release date			ISBN	Ref.
Volume		Episodes	NA	UK & IE	AUS & NZ	ISBN	Ref.
Season Nine	Voyage One	517–528	June 20, 2017	N/A	August 16, 2017	ISBN N/A	
Season Nine	Voyage Two	529–540	August 15, 2017	N/A	October 4, 2017	ISBN N/A	
Season Nine	Voyage Three	541, 543–552	October 10, 2017	N/A	December 6, 2017	ISBN N/A	
Season Nine	Voyage Four	553–563	March 20, 2018	N/A	May 9, 2018	ISBN N/A	
Season Nine	Voyage Five	564–574	May 15, 2018	N/A	July 4, 2018	ISBN N/A	
Season Ten	Voyage One	575–587	June 9, 2020	N/A	August 5, 2020	ISBN N/A	
Season Ten	Voyage Two	588–589, 591–600	September 8, 2020	N/A	N/A	ISBN N/A	
Season Ten	Voyage Three	601–614	November 10, 2020	N/A	N/A	ISBN N/A	
Season Ten	Voyage Four	615–628	January 5, 2021	N/A	N/A	ISBN N/A	
Season Eleven	Voyage One	629–641	March 23, 2021	N/A	N/A	ISBN N/A	
Season Eleven	Voyage Two	642–654	May 11, 2021	N/A	N/A	ISBN N/A	
Season Eleven	Voyage Three	655–667	July 6, 2021	N/A	N/A	ISBN N/A	
Season Eleven	Voyage Four	668–680	September 7, 2021	N/A	N/A	ISBN N/A	
Season Eleven	Voyage Five	681–693	November 9, 2021	N/A	N/A	ISBN N/A	
Season Eleven	Voyage Six	694–706	January 4, 2022	N/A	N/A	ISBN N/A	
Season Eleven	Voyage Seven	707–719	March 29, 2022	N/A	N/A	ISBN N/A	
Season Eleven	Voyage Eight	720–732	June 7, 2022	N/A	N/A	ISBN N/A	
Season Eleven	Voyage Nine	733–746	July 5, 2022	N/A	N/A	ISBN N/A	
Season Twelve	Voyage One	747–758	October 4, 2022	N/A	N/A	ISBN N/A	
Season Twelve	Voyage Two	759–770	January 17, 2023	N/A	N/A	ISBN N/A	
Season Twelve	Voyage Three	771–782	March 21, 2023	N/A	N/A	ISBN N/A	
Season Thirteen	Voyage One	783–794	July 4, 2023	N/A	N/A	ISBN N/A	
Season Thirteen	Voyage Two	795–806	August 8, 2023	N/A	N/A	ISBN N/A	
Season Thirteen	Voyage Three	807–818	September 12, 2023	N/A	N/A	ISBN N/A	
Season Thirteen	Voyage Four	819–830	January 9, 2024	N/A	N/A	ISBN N/A	
Season Thirteen	Voyage Five	831–842	February 13, 2024	N/A	N/A	ISBN N/A	
Season Thirteen	Voyage Six	843–854	March 12, 2024	N/A	N/A	ISBN N/A	
Season Thirteen	Voyage Seven	855–866	May 7, 2024	N/A	N/A	ISBN N/A	
Season Thirteen	Voyage Eight	867–878	July 9, 2024	N/A	N/A	ISBN N/A	
Season Thirteen	Voyage Nine	879–891	August 13, 2024	N/A	N/A	ISBN N/A	
Collection	22	517–540	September 25, 2018	July 6, 2020	N/A	ISBN N/A	
Collection	23	541, 543–563	November 13, 2018	September 7, 2020	N/A	ISBN N/A	
Collection	24	564–587	February 2, 2021	November 29, 2021	N/A	ISBN N/A	
Collection	25	588–589, 591–614	May 11, 2021	April 4, 2022	N/A	ISBN N/A	
Collection	26	615–641	June 15, 2021	May 16, 2022	N/A	ISBN N/A	
Collection	27	642–667	August 10, 2021	June 27, 2022	N/A	ISBN N/A	
Collection	28	668–693	December 14, 2021	August 15, 2022	N/A	ISBN N/A	
Collection	29	694–719	April 12, 2022	September 26, 2022	N/A	ISBN N/A	
Collection	30	720–746	August 2, 2022	January 30, 2023	N/A	ISBN N/A	
Collection	31	747–770	April 11, 2023	July 3, 2023	N/A	ISBN N/A	
Collection	32	771–794	August 8, 2023	September 4, 2023	N/A	ISBN N/A	
Collection	33	795–818	December 12, 2023	March 11, 2024	N/A	ISBN N/A	
Collection	34	819–842	September 10, 2024	October 7, 2024	N/A	ISBN N/A	
Collection	35	843–866	October 15, 2024	November 11, 2024	N/A	ISBN N/A	
Collection	36	867–891	February 11, 2025	March 10, 2025	N/A	ISBN N/A	
