= List of One Piece episodes (seasons 20–present) =

Episodes 892 onwards of One Piece

One Piece is an anime television series based on Eiichiro Oda's manga series of the same name. Produced by Toei Animation, and directed by Konosuke Uda, Munehisa Sakai, and Hiroaki Miyamoto, it began broadcasting on Fuji Television on October 20, 1999. One Piece follows the adventures of Monkey D. Luffy, a 17-year-old young man, whose body has gained the properties of rubber from accidentally eating a supernatural fruit, and his crew of diverse pirates, named the Straw Hat Pirates. Luffy's greatest ambition is to obtain the ultimate treasure in the world, One Piece, and thereby become the next King of the Pirates. The series uses 44 pieces of theme music: 25 opening themes and 19 closing themes. Several CDs that contain the theme music and other tracks have been released by Toei Animation. The first DVD compilation was released on February 21, 2001, with individual volumes releasing monthly. The Singaporean company Odex released part of the series locally in English and Japanese in the form of dual audio Video CDs.

The first unedited, bilingual DVD box set, containing 13 episodes, was released on May 27, 2008. Similarly sized sets followed with 31 sets released as of July 2015. Episodes began streaming on August 29, 2009.

== Series overview ==
Season	Main arc title(s)	Episodes	Originally released	
Season	Main arc title(s)	Episodes	First released	Last released
1	East Blue	61	October 20, 1999	March 7, 2001
2	Entering into the Grand Line	16	March 21, 2001	August 19, 2001
3	Introducing Chopper at Drum Kingdom	15	August 26, 2001	December 9, 2001
4	Alabasta	38	December 16, 2001	October 27, 2002
5	TV Original	13	November 3, 2002	February 2, 2003
6	Skypiea	52	February 9, 2003	June 13, 2004
7	Escape! The Naval Fortress & The Foxy Pirate Crew	33	June 20, 2004	March 27, 2005
8	Water Seven	35	April 17, 2005	April 30, 2006
9	Enies Lobby	73	May 21, 2006	December 23, 2007
10	Thriller Bark	45	January 6, 2008	December 14, 2008
11	Sabaody Archipelago	26	December 21, 2008	June 28, 2009
12	Amazon Lily	14	July 5, 2009	October 11, 2009
13	Impel Down	35	October 18, 2009	June 20, 2010
14	Marineford	60	June 27, 2010	September 25, 2011
15	Fish-Man Island	62	October 2, 2011	December 23, 2012
16	Punk Hazard	50	January 6, 2013	January 12, 2014
17	Dressrosa	118	January 19, 2014	June 19, 2016
18	Zou	36	June 26, 2016	April 2, 2017
19	Whole Cake Island	109	April 9, 2017	June 30, 2019
20	Wano Country	197	July 7, 2019	December 17, 2023
21	Egghead	67	January 7, 2024	December 28, 2025
22	Elbaph	24	April 5, 2026	TBA

== Episodes ==
=== Season 20: Wano Country (2019–23) ===
No. overall (Note: Episode number by Toei Animation's count)	No. in season	Title (Note: Title of the episode: literally translated, romanized using Hepburn romanization, and in kanji form)	Directed by	Written by	Animation directed by	Original release date (Note: Date the episode originally aired on Fuji Television)
Wano Country
892	1	"The Land of Wano! To the Samurai Country where Cherry Blossoms Flutter!"; Transliteration: "Wano Kuni! Sakuramau Samurai no Kuni e" (Japanese: ワノ国！桜舞うサムライの国へ)	Tatsuya Nagamine	Shōji Yonemura	Midori Matsuda	July 7, 2019
893	2	"Otama Appears! Luffy vs. Kaido's Army!"; Transliteration: "Otama Tōjō – Rufi tai Kaidō-gun!" (Japanese: お玉登場 ルフィVSカイドウ軍！)	Kōhei Kureta	Atsuhiro Tomioka	Shūichi Itō	July 14, 2019
894	3	"He'll Come! The Legend of Ace in the Land of Wano!"; Transliteration: "Kanarazu kuru – Wano Kuni no Ēsu Densetsu!" (Japanese: 必ず来る ワノ国のエース伝説！)	Aya Komaki	Hitoshi Tanaka	Yusuke Isouchi & Yukiko Nakatani	July 21, 2019
Cidre Guild
895	4	"Side Story! The World's Greatest Bounty Hunter, Cidre!"; Transliteration: "Tokubetsu-hen! Saikyō no Shōkin Kari Shīdoru" (Japanese: 特別編！最強の賞金狩りシードル)	Yutaka Nakashima	Atsuhiro Tomioka	Masahiro Kitazaki	July 28, 2019
896	5	"Side Story! Clash! Luffy vs. the King of Carbonation!"; Transliteration: "Tokubetsu-hen! Kessen! Rufi tai Tansan-ō" (Japanese: 特別編！決戦！ルフィVS炭酸王)	Yutaka Nakashima	Atsuhiro Tomioka	Shigefumi Shingaki	August 4, 2019
Wano Country
897	6	"Save Otama! Straw Hat, Bounding through the Wasteland!"; Transliteration: "O-Tama Sukue – Mugiwara Kōya o Kakeru!" (Japanese: お玉救え 麦わら荒野を駆ける！)	Satoshi Itō	Tomohiro Nakayama	Kimitaka Itō & Eisaku Inoue	August 11, 2019
898	7	"The Headliner! Hawkins the Magician Appears!"; Transliteration: "Shin'uchi! Majutsu-shi Hōkinsu Tōjō" (Japanese: 真打ち! 魔術師ホーキンス登場)	Yasunori Koyama	Shinzō Fujita	Masahiro Shimanuki	August 18, 2019
899	8	"Defeat is Inevitable! The Strawman's Fierce Attack!"; Transliteration: "Haiboku Kakutei – Sutorō Man no Mōkō!" (Japanese: 敗北確定 ストローマンの猛攻！)	Yusuke Suzuki	Akiko Inoue	Toshio Deguchi	August 25, 2019
900	9	"The Greatest Day of My Life! Otama and Her Sweet Red-bean Soup!"; Transliteration: "Saikō no Hi – O-Tama Hajimete no O-Shiruko" (Japanese: 最高の日 お玉初めてのおしるこ)	Directed by : Tasuku Shimaya; Storyboarded by : Aya Komaki	Shōji Yonemura	Kenji Yokoyama	September 1, 2019
901	10	"Charging into the Enemy's Territory! Bakura Town – Where Officials Thrive!"; Transliteration: "Tekijin Totsunyū – Yakunin Habikoru Bakura-chō!" (Japanese: 敵陣突入 役人はびこる博羅町！)	Satoshi Itō	Hitoshi Tanaka	Masahiro Kitazaki	September 8, 2019
902	11	"The Yokozuna Appears! The Invincible Urashima Goes After Okiku!"; Transliteration: "Yokozuna Tōjō – O-Kiku Nerau Muteki no Urashima!" (Japanese: 横綱登場 お菊狙う無敵の浦島！)	Katsumi Tokoro	Tomohiro Nakayama	Masahiro Kitazaki	September 15, 2019
903	12	"A Climactic Sumo Battle! Straw Hat vs. the Strongest Ever Yokozuna!"; Transliteration: "Sumō Kessen – Mugiwara tai Saikyō no Yokozuna!" (Japanese: 相撲決戦 麦わらVS最強の横綱！)	Directed by : Yusuke Suzuki; Storyboarded by : Yutaka Nakashima	Ryo Yamazaki	Shūichi Itō	September 22, 2019
904	13	"Luffy Rages! Rescue Otama from Danger!"; Transliteration: "Rufi Gekido – Pinchi no Otama o Sukue!" (Japanese: ルフィ激怒 ピンチのお玉を救え！)	Masahiro Hosoda	Shinzō Fujita	Masayuki Takagi	September 29, 2019
905	14	"Taking Back Otama! A Fierce Fight Against Holdem!"; Transliteration: "Otama Dakkan Gekitō! Hōrudemu-sen!" (Japanese: お玉奪還 激闘！ホールデム戦！)	Tasuku Shimaya	Akiko Inoue	Masahiro Shimanuki	October 6, 2019
906	15	"Duel! The Magician and the Surgeon of Death!"; Transliteration: "Ikkiuchi – Majutsushi to Shi no Gekai!" (Japanese: 一騎打ち 魔術師と死の外科医！)	Directed by : Yasunori Koyama; Storyboarded by : Toshinori Fukuzawa	Shōji Yonemura	Shigefumi Shingaki	October 13, 2019
Romance Dawn
907	16	"20th Anniversary Special! Romance Dawn"; Transliteration: "20-Shūnen! - Tokubetsu-hen Romansu Dōn" (Japanese: 20周年！特別編ロマンスドーン)	Kōhei Kureta	Shōji Yonemura	Kimitaka Itō & Eisaku Inoue	October 20, 2019
Wano Country
908	17	"The Coming of the Treasure Ship! Luffytaro Returns the Favor!"; Transliteration: "Takarabune Tōrai – Rufitarō no Ongaeshi!" (Japanese: 宝船到来 ルフィ太郎の恩返し！)	Yutaka Nakashima	Hitoshi Tanaka	Toshio Deguchi	October 27, 2019
909	18	"Mysterious Grave Markers! A Reunion at the Ruins of Oden Castle!"; Transliteration: "Nazo no Bohyō – Oden Jōseki de no Saikai!" (Japanese: 謎の墓標 おでん城跡での再会！)	Aya Komaki	Tomohiro Nakayama	Kenji Yokoyama	November 10, 2019
910	19	"A Legendary Samurai! The Man Who Roger Admired!"; Transliteration: "Densetsu no Samurai – Rojā ga Horeta Otoko!" (Japanese: 伝説の侍 ロジャーが惚れた男！)	Satoshi Itō	Shinzō Fujita	Kazuya Hisada	November 17, 2019
911	20	"Bringing Down the Emperor of the Sea! A Secret Raid Operation Begins!"; Transliteration: "Datō Yonkō – Gokuhi Uchiiri Sakusen Hatsudō" (Japanese: 打倒四皇 極秘討ち入り作戦発動)	Daisuke Nakajima	Ryo Yamazaki	Masahiro Kitazaki	November 24, 2019
912	21	"The Strongest Man in the World! Shutenmaru, the Thieves Brigade Chief!"; Transliteration: "Saikyō no Otoko – Tōzoku-dan Tōryō: Shutenmaru!" (Japanese: 最強の男 盗賊団棟梁・酒天丸！)	Directed by : Masahiro Hosoda; Storyboarded by : Akitaro Daichi	Akiko Inoue	Masayuki Takagi	December 1, 2019
913	22	"Everyone is Annihilated! Kaido's Furious Blast Breath!"; Transliteration: "Zen'in Shōmetsu – Kaidō Ikari no Boro Buresu!" (Japanese: 全員消滅 カイドウ怒りのボロブレス！)	Yusuke Suzuki	Tomohiro Nakayama	Eisaku Inoue	December 8, 2019
914	23	"Finally Clashing! The Ferocious Luffy vs. Kaido!"; Transliteration: "Tsuini Gekitotsu – Mōkō Rufi tai Kaidō" (Japanese: 遂に激突 猛攻ルフィVSカイドウ)	Yasunori Koyama	Shinzō Fujita	Masahiro Shimanuki & Kimitaka Itō	December 15, 2019
915	24	"Destructive! One Shot, One Kill – Thunder Bagua!"; Transliteration: "Hakai-teki! Ichigeki Hissatsu no Raimei Hakke!" (Japanese: 破壊的！一撃必殺の雷鳴八卦！)	Katsumi Tokoro	Ryo Yamazaki	Shigefumi Shingaki	December 22, 2019
916	25	"A Living Hell! Luffy, Humiliated in the Great Mine!"; Transliteration: "Iki-Jigoku! Rufi Kutsujoku no Dai Saikutsu-jō" (Japanese: 生き地獄 ルフィ屈辱の大採掘場)	Yutaka Nakashima	Shōji Yonemura	Shūichi Itō	January 5, 2020
917	26	"The Holyland in Tumult! Emperor of the Sea Blackbeard Cackles!"; Transliteration: "Seichi Gekidō – Futeki ni Warau Yonkō Kurohige" (Japanese: 聖地激動 不敵に笑う四皇黒ひげ)	Aya Komaki	Hitoshi Tanaka	Kenji Yokoyama	January 12, 2020
918	27	"It's On! The Special Operation to Bring Down Kaido!"; Transliteration: "Ugokidasu – Datō Kaidō Daikeikaku!" (Japanese: 動き出す 打倒カイドウ大計画！)	Masahiro Hosoda	Akiko Inoue	Kazuya Hisada	January 19, 2020
919	28	"Rampage! The Prisoners – Luffy and Kid!"; Transliteration: "Dai Abare! Shūjin Rufi to Kiddo!" (Japanese: 大暴れ！囚人ルフィとキッド！)	Satoshi Itō	Atsuhiro Tomioka	Kazuya Hisada	January 26, 2020
920	29	"A Great Sensation! Sanji's Special Soba!"; Transliteration: "Dai Hyōban! Sanji no Ohako Soba!" (Japanese: 大評判！サンジの十八番そば！)	Yutaka Nakashima	Shinzō Fujita	Keita Saitō & Toshio Deguchi	February 2, 2020
921	30	"Luxurious and Gorgeous! Wano's Most Beautiful Woman – Komurasaki!"; Transliteration: "Gōka Kenran – Wano Kuni Ichi no Bijo: Komurasaki" (Japanese: 豪華絢爛 ワノ国一の美女・小紫)	Directed by : Yasunori Koyama; Storyboarded by : Hiroshi Hara	Tomohiro Nakayama	Masahiro Kitazaki	February 9, 2020
922	31	"A Tale of Chivalry! Zoro and Tonoyasu's Little Trip!"; Transliteration: "Ninkyō Den! Zoro to Tonoyasu Futari-tabi!" (Japanese: 任侠伝！ゾロとトの康二人旅！)	Yusuke Suzuki	Ryo Yamazaki	Masayuki Takagi	February 16, 2020
923	32	"A State of Emergency! Big Mom Closes in!" Transliteration: "Kinkyū Jitai – Biggu Mamu Dai Sekkin!" (Japanese: 緊急事態 ビッグ・マム大接近！)	Directed by : Katsumi Tokoro; Storyboarded by : Akitaro Daichi	Shōji Yonemura	Masahiro Shimanuki	February 23, 2020
924	33	"The Capital in an Uproar! Another Assassin Targets Sanji!"; Transliteration: "Miyako Sōzen! Sanji Nerau Aratana Shikaku" (Japanese: 都騒然！サンジ狙う新たな刺客)	Tasuku Shimaya	Hitoshi Tanaka	Eisaku Inoue & Kimitaka Itō	March 15, 2020
925	34	"Dashing! The Righteous Soba Mask!"; Transliteration: "Dai Katsuyaku! Masayoshi no O-Soba Masuku!" (Japanese: 大活躍！正義のおそばマスク！)	Midori Tanaka	Akiko Inoue	Kenji Yokoyama	March 22, 2020
926	35	"A Desperate Situation! Orochi's Menacing Oniwabanshu!"; Transliteration: "Zettai Zetsumei – Kyōi no Orochi Oniwabanshū" (Japanese: 絶体絶命 脅威のオロチお庭番衆)	Ryōsuke Tanaka	Shinzō Fujita	Shūichi Itō	March 29, 2020
927	36	"Pandemonium! The Monster Snake, Shogun Orochi!"; Transliteration: "Shura-jō! Osoreru Daija – Shōgun Orochi" (Japanese: 修羅場！怒れる大蛇 将軍オロチ)	Satoshi Itō	Atsuhiro Tomioka	Shigefumi Shingaki & Keiichi Ichikawa	April 5, 2020
928	37	"The Flower Falls! The Final Moment of the Most Beautiful Woman in the Land of Wano!"; Transliteration: "Hana Chiru! Wano Kuni Ichi no Bijo no Saigo" (Japanese: 花散る！ワノ国一の美女の最期)	Katsumi Tokoro	Tomohiro Nakayama	Kazuya Hisada	April 12, 2020
929	38	"The Bond Between Prisoners! Luffy and Old Man Hyo!"; Transliteration: "Shūjin no Kizuna – Rufi to Hyōjii!" (Japanese: 囚人の絆 ルフィとヒョウじい！)	Yasunori Koyama	Ryo Yamazaki	Eisaku Inoue	April 19, 2020
930	39	"A Lead Performer! Queen the Plague Emerges!"; Transliteration: "Ōkanban! Ekisai no Kuīn Arawaru" (Japanese: 大看板! 疫災のクイーン現る！)	Yusuke Suzuki	Shōji Yonemura	Masahiro Shimanuki	June 28, 2020 (Note: This episode was originally scheduled to air on April 26, 2020, but was subsequently delayed and replaced with a rerun of episode 892.)
931	40	"Climb Up! Luffy's Desperate Escape!"; Transliteration: "Yojinobore – Rufi Kesshi no Tōsō-geki!" (Japanese: よじ登れ ルフィ決死の逃走劇！)	Yutaka Nakashima	Akiko Inoue	Yūsuke Isōchi	July 5, 2020
932	41	"Dead or Alive! Queen's Sumo Inferno!"; Transliteration: "Sei ka Shi ka – Kuīn no Ōzumō Inferuno" (Japanese: 生か死か クイーンの大相撲地獄(インフェルノ))	Masahiro Hosoda	Hitoshi Tanaka	Masayuki Takagi	July 12, 2020
933	42	"Gyukimaru! Zoro Fights a Duel on Bandit's Bridge!"; Transliteration: "Gyūkimaru! Zoro Oihagi-bashi no Kettō" (Japanese: 牛鬼丸！ゾロおいはぎ橋の決闘)	Aya Komaki	Shinzō Fujita	Toshio Deguchi & Midori Matsuda	July 19, 2020
934	43	"A Big Turnover! The Three-Sword Style Overcomes Danger!"; Transliteration: "Dai-Gyakuten! Shisen o Koeta Santōryū" (Japanese: 大逆転！死線を越えた三刀流！)	Tatsuya Nagamine	Tomohiro Nakayama	Midori Matsuda & Keita Saitō	July 26, 2020
935	44	"Zoro, Stunned! The Shocking Identity of the Mysterious Woman!"; Transliteration: "Zoro Kyōgaku – Shōgeki! Nazo no Bijo no Shōtai" (Japanese: ゾロ驚愕 衝撃! 謎の美女の正体)	Kenichi Takeshita	Ryo Yamazaki	Kenji Yokoyama	August 2, 2020
936	45	"Get the Hang of It! The Land of Wano's Haki – Ryuo!"; Transliteration: "Etoku Seyo – Wano Kuni no Haki, Ryūō!" (Japanese: 会得せよ ワノ国の覇気・流桜！)	Tasuku Shimaya	Shōji Yonemura	Shigefumi Shingaki	August 9, 2020
937	46	"Tonoyasu! Ebisu Town's Most Loved!"; Transliteration: "Tonoyasu! Ebisu-chō ichi no Ninkimono!" (Japanese: トの康！えびす町一の人気者！)	Satoshi Itō	Akiko Inoue	Kazuya Hisada	August 16, 2020
938	47	"Shaking the Nation! The Identity of Ushimitsu Kozo The Chivalrous Thief!"; Transliteration: "Shōgeki Hashiru – Gizoku Ushimitsu Kozō no Shōtai" (Japanese: 衝撃走る 義賊丑三つ小僧の正体)	Yasunori Koyama	Shinzō Fujita	Shūichi Itō	August 23, 2020
939	48	"The Straw Hats Run! Save the Captive Tonoyasu!"; Transliteration: "Ichimi Hashiru! Sukue Toraware no Tonoyasu" (Japanese: 一味疾る！救え囚われのトの康)	Yusuke Suzuki	Hitoshi Tanaka	Masahiro Shimanuki	August 30, 2020
940	49	"Zoro's Fury! The Truth About the Smile!"; Transliteration: "Zoro no Ikari – Sumairu no Shinjitsu!" (Japanese: ゾロの怒り SMILEの真実！)	Yutaka Nakashima	Tomohiro Nakayama	Eisaku Inoue & Kimitaka Itō	September 6, 2020
941	50	"Toko's Tears! Orochi's Pitiless Bullets!"; Transliteration: "Toko no Namida! Orochi Hijō no Jūdan!" (Japanese: トコの涙！オロチ非情の銃弾！)	Katsumi Tokoro	Ryo Yamazaki	Masayuki Takagi	September 13, 2020
942	51	"The Straw Hats Step In! An Uproarious Deadly Battle at the Execution Ground!"; Transliteration: "Ichimi Ran'nyū! Sōzen! Shokei-jō no Gekitō" (Japanese: 一味乱入！騒然！処刑場の激闘)	Kōhei Kureta	Shōji Yonemura	Toshio Deguchi & Keita Saitō	September 20, 2020
943	52	"Luffy's Determination! Win Through the Sumo Inferno!"; Transliteration: "Rufi no Ketsui – Yabure Ōzumō Inferuno!" (Japanese: ルフィの決意 破れ大相撲地獄(インフェルノ)！)	Tasuku Shimaya	Akiko Inoue	Shigefumi Shingaki	September 27, 2020
944	53	"The Storm Has Come! A Raging Big Mom!"; Transliteration: "Arashi Tōrai! Ō-abare Biggu Mamu!" (Japanese: 嵐到来！大暴れビッグ・マム！)	Masahiro Hosoda	Shinzō Fujita	Kenji Yokoyama	October 4, 2020
945	54	"A Grudge Over Red-bean Soup! Luffy Gets into a Desperate Situation!"; Transliteration: "Oshiruko no Urami – Rufi Zettai Zetsumei" (Japanese: おしるこの恨み ルフィ絶体絶命)	Yusuke Suzuki	Hitoshi Tanaka	Kazuya Hisada	October 11, 2020
946	55	"Stop the Emperor of the Sea! Queen's Secret Plan!"; Transliteration: "Yonkō o Tomero! Kuīn no Hisaku" (Japanese: 四皇を止めろ！クイーンの秘策)	Yutaka Nakashima	Tomohiro Nakayama	Yong-Ce Tu	October 18, 2020
947	56	"Brutal Ammunition! The Plague Rounds Aim at Luffy!"; Transliteration: "Saikyō Heiki! Rufi o Nerau Ekisaito Dan" (Japanese: 最凶兵器！ルフィを狙う疫災弾)	Directed by : Takuhito Satō; Storyboarded by : Akitaro Daichi	Ryo Yamazaki	Ippei Masui & Kaon'nuri	October 25, 2020
948	57	"Start Fighting Back! Luffy and the Akazaya Samurai!"; Transliteration: "Hangeki Kaishi! Rufi to Akazaya no Samurai!" (Japanese: 反撃開始！ルフィと赤鞘の侍！)	Yutaka Nakashima	Shōji Yonemura	Shūichi Itō	November 1, 2020
949	58	"We're Here to Win! Luffy's Desperate Scream!"; Transliteration: "Kachi ni Kita! Rufi Kesshi no Sakebi" (Japanese: 勝ちに来た！ルフィ決死の叫び)	Kenichi Takeshita	Atsuhiro Tomioka	Kimitaka Itō & Toshio Deguchi	November 8, 2020
950	59	"Warriors' Dream! Luffy's Conquer of Udon!"; Transliteration: "Tsuwamono-domo ga Yume! Rufi Udon Seiatsu!" (Japanese: 兵どもが夢！ルフィ兎丼制圧！)	Yasunori Koyama	Akiko Inoue	Masahiro Shimanuki	November 15, 2020
951	60	"Orochi's Hunting Party! The Ninja Group vs. Zoro!"; Transliteration: "Orochi no Otte! Ninja Gundan tai Zoro" (Japanese: オロチの追手！忍者軍団VSゾロ)	Satoshi Itō	Shinzō Fujita	Masayuki Takagi	November 22, 2020
952	61	"Tension Rises in Onigashima! Two Emperors of the Sea Meet?!"; Transliteration: "Onigashima Kinpaku! Sōgū!? Futari no Yonkō" (Japanese: 鬼ヶ島緊迫！遭遇!? 二人の四皇)	Katsumi Tokoro	Hitoshi Tanaka	Shigefumi Shingaki	November 29, 2020
953	62	"Hiyori's Confession! A Reunion at Bandit's Bridge!"; Transliteration: "Hiyori no Kokuhaku! Oihagi-bashi no Saikai" (Japanese: 日和の告白！おいはぎ橋の再会)	Directed by : Ryōsuke Tanaka; Storyboarded by : Yutaka Nakashima	Tomohiro Nakayama	Keita Saitō	December 6, 2020
954	63	"Its Name is Enma! Oden's Great Swords!"; Transliteration: "Sono Na wa Enma! Oden no Meitō!" (Japanese: その名は閻魔！おでんの名刀！)	Kōhei Kureta	Tomohiro Nakayama	Kazuya Hisada	December 13, 2020
955	64	"A New Alliance?! Kaido's Army Gathers!"; Transliteration: "Arata na Dōmei!? Kaidō-gun Dai Shūketsu" (Japanese: 新たな同盟!? カイドウ軍大集結)	Tasuku Shimaya	Shōji Yonemura	Kenji Yokoyama	December 20, 2020
956	65	"Ticking Down to the Great Battle! The Straw Hats Go into Combat Mode!"; Transliteration: "Semaru Kessen! Mugiwara Ichimi Sentō Taisei" (Japanese: 迫る決戦！麦わら一味戦闘態勢)	Directed by : Nanami Michibata; Storyboarded by : Tatsuya Nagamine	Akiko Inoue	Midori Matsuda & Toshio Deguchi	December 27, 2020
957	66	"Big News! An Incident That Will Affect the Seven Warlords!"; Transliteration: "Biggu Nyūsu! Shichibukai o Osou Jiken" (Japanese: 大ニュース！七武海を襲う事件)	Megumi Ishitani	Shinzō Fujita	Eisaku Inoue & Kimitaka Itō	January 10, 2021
958	67	"A Legendary Battle! Garp and Roger!"; Transliteration: "Densetsu no Tatakai! Gāpu to Rojā" (Japanese: 伝説の戦い！ガープとロジャー)	Directed by : Hikaru Takeuchi; Storyboarded by : Yutaka Nakashima	Hitoshi Tanaka	Ippei Masui	January 17, 2021
959	68	"The Rendezvous Port! The Land of Wano Act Three Begins!"; Transliteration: "Yakusoku no Minato! Wano Kuni-hen Daisanmaku Kaimaku" (Japanese: 約束の港！ワノ国編第三幕開幕)	Yusuke Suzuki	Tomohiro Nakayama	Shūichi Itō	January 24, 2021
960	69	"The Number-One Samurai in the Land of Wano! Here comes Kozuki Oden!"; Transliteration: "Wano Kuni Ichi no Samurai! Kōzuki Oden Tōjō" (Japanese: ワノ国一の侍！光月おでん登場)	Aya Komaki	Shōji Yonemura	Masayuki Takagi	January 31, 2021
961	70	"Tearfully Swearing Allegiance! Oden and Kin'emon!"; Transliteration: "Namida no Deshiiri – Oden to Kin'emon" (Japanese: 涙の弟子入り おでんと錦えもん)	Toshinori Fukuzawa	Ryo Yamazaki	Yūsuke Isōchi	February 7, 2021
962	71	"Changing Destiny! The Whitebeard Pirates Cast Ashore!"; Transliteration: "Ugoku Unmei Hyōchaku! Shirohige Kaizokudan!" (Japanese: 動く運命 漂着！白ひげ海賊団！)	Yasunori Koyama	Atsuhiro Tomioka	Masahiro Shimanuki	February 14, 2021
963	72	"Oden's Determination! Whitebeard's Test!"; Transliteration: "Oden no Ketsui! Shirohige no Shiren!" (Japanese: おでんの決意！白ひげの試練！)	Satoshi Itō	Akiko Inoue	Shigefumi Shingaki & Yong-Ce Tu	February 21, 2021
964	73	"Whitebeard's Little Brother! Oden's Great Adventure!"; Transliteration: "Shirohige no Otōto! Oden no Dai Bōken!" (Japanese: 白ひげの弟！おでんの大冒険！)	Yutaka Nakashima	Shinzō Fujita	Toshio Deguchi & Keita Saitō	February 28, 2021
965	74	"Crossing Swords! Roger and Whitebeard!"; Transliteration: "Majieru Yaiba! Rojā to Shirohige!" (Japanese: 交える刃！ロジャーと白ひげ！)	Kenichi Takeshita	Hitoshi Tanaka	Kazuya Hisada	March 7, 2021
966	75	"Roger's Wish! A New Journey!"; Transliteration: "Rojā no Negai! Arata na Tabidachi" (Japanese: ロジャーの願い！新たな旅立ち)	Tasuku Shimaya	Tomohiro Nakayama	Eisaku Inoue & Kimitaka Itō	March 21, 2021
967	76	"Devoting His Life! Roger's Adventure!"; Transliteration: "Shōgai o Kakete! Rojā no Bōken" (Japanese: 生涯をかけて！ロジャーの冒険)	Masahiro Hosoda	Shōji Yonemura	Kenji Yokoyama	March 28, 2021
968	77	"The King of the Pirates is Born! Arriving at the Last Island!"; Transliteration: "Kaizoku Ō Tanjō – Tōtatsu! "Saigo no Shima"" (Japanese: 海賊王誕生 到達！"最後の島")	Katsumi Tokoro	Ryo Yamazaki	Shūichi Itō	April 4, 2021
969	78	"To the Land of Wano! The Roger Pirates Disband!"; Transliteration: "Wano Kuni e! Rojā Kaizokudan Kaisan" (Japanese: ワノ国へ！ロジャー海賊団解散)	Directed by : Takaaki Ishiyama; Storyboarded by : Yutaka Nakashima	Atsuhiro Tomioka	Ippei Masui & Han Eunmi	April 11, 2021
970	79	"Sad News! The Opening of the Great Pirate Era!"; Transliteration: "Kanashiki Shirase – Dai Kaizoku Jidai Makuake" (Japanese: 悲しき知らせ 大海賊時代幕開け)	Yusuke Suzuki	Akiko Inoue	Masayuki Takagi	April 18, 2021
971	80	"Raid! Oden and the Akazaya Nine!"; Transliteration: "Uchiiri! Oden to Akazaya Kunin Otoko" (Japanese: 討ち入り！おでんと赤鞘九人男)	Yasunori Koyama	Shinzō Fujita	Masahiro Shimanuki	April 25, 2021
972	81	"The End of the Battle! Oden vs. Kaido!"; Transliteration: "Ketchaku no Toki! Oden tai Kaidō!" (Japanese: 決着の時！おでんVSカイドウ！)	Directed by : Ryōsuke Tanaka; Storyboarded by : Aya Komaki	Hitoshi Tanaka	Yong-Ce Tu	May 2, 2021
973	82	"Boiled to Death! Oden's One-hour Struggle!"; Transliteration: "Kamayude no Kei – Oden Kesshi no Ichijikan" (Japanese: 釜茹での刑 おでん決死の一時間)	Satoshi Itō	Tomohiro Nakayama	Shigefumi Shingaki	May 9, 2021
974	83	"Oden Wouldn't Be Oden If It Wasn't Boiled!"; Transliteration: "〝Niete Nanbo no Oden ni Sōrō〟" (Japanese: 〝煮えてなんぼのおでんに候〟)	Yutaka Nakashima	Shōji Yonemura	Keita Saitō & Toshio Deguchi	May 16, 2021
975	84	"The Castle on Fire! The Fate of the Kozuki Clan!"; Transliteration: "Moeru Shiro! Kōzuki no Ichizoku no Unmei!" (Japanese: 燃える城！光月の一族の運命！)	Katsumi Tokoro	Ryo Yamazaki	Kazuya Hisada	May 23, 2021
976	85	"Back to the Present Day! 20 Years Later!"; Transliteration: "Futatabi Genzai! Nijū-nen no Toki o Koete" (Japanese: 再び現在！二十年の時をこえて)	Directed by : Tasuku Shimaya; Storyboarded by : Tasuku Shimaya & Yutaka Nakashima	Atsuhiro Tomioka	Eisaku Inoue & Kimitaka Itō	May 30, 2021
977	86	"The Sea Is For Pirates! Raid! To Onigashima!"; Transliteration: "Umi wa Kaizoku! Uchiiri! Iza Onigashima" (Japanese: 海は海賊！討入り！いざ鬼ヶ島)	Masahiro Hosoda	Akiko Inoue	Kenji Yokoyama	June 6, 2021
978	87	"The Worst Generation Charges in! The Battle of the Stormy Sea!"; Transliteration: "Saiaku no Sedai Shingeki! Arashi no Umi no Tatakai" (Japanese: 最悪の世代進撃！嵐の海の戦い)	Kōhei Kureta	Shinzō Fujita	Shūichi Itō & Midori Matsuda	June 13, 2021
979	88	"Good Luck?! Leader Kin'emon's Plot!"; Transliteration: "Kyōun!? Rīdā Kin'emon no Ikkei" (Japanese: 強運!? リーダー錦えもんの一計)	Directed by : Toshihiro Maeya; Storyboarded by : Toshinori Fukuzawa	Hitoshi Tanaka	Shinichi Suzuki & Song Hyeonjy	June 20, 2021
980	89	"A Tearful Promise! The Kidnapped Momonosuke!"; Transliteration: "Namida no Yakusoku! Sarawareta Momonosuke" (Japanese: 涙の約束！さらわれたモモの助)	Kenichi Takeshita	Tomohiro Nakayama	Masayuki Takagi & Eisaku Inoue	June 27, 2021
981	90	"A New Member! 'First Son of the Sea' Jimbei!"; Transliteration: "Arata na Nakama! Kaikyō no Jinbē!" (Japanese: 新たな仲間！海侠のジンベエ！)	Yusuke Suzuki	Shōji Yonemura	Masahiro Shimanuki & Shigenori Taniguchi	July 4, 2021
982	91	"Kaido's Trump Card! The Tobi Roppo Appear!"; Transliteration: "Kaidō no Kirifuda – Tobi Roppō Tōjō" (Japanese: カイドウの切り札 飛び六胞登場)	Megumi Ishitani	Ryo Yamazaki	Yong-Ce Tu & Keita Saitō	July 11, 2021
983	92	"The Samurai Warriors' Earnestness! The Straw Hats Land at Onigashima!"; Transliteration: "Samurai-tachi no Honki! Ichimi Onigashima Jōriku" (Japanese: 侍たちの本気！一味鬼ヶ島上陸)	Directed by : Nanami Michibata; Storyboarded by : Yutaka Nakashima	Atsuhiro Tomioka	Toshio Deguchi & Shingo Fujisaki	July 18, 2021
984	93	"Luffy Goes Out of Control?! Sneaking into Kaido's Banquet!"; Transliteration: "Rufi Bōsō!? Sen'nyū Kaidō no Utage" (Japanese: ルフィ暴走!? 潜入カイドウの宴)	Yasunori Koyama	Shōji Yonemura	Shigefumi Shingaki	July 25, 2021
985	94	"Thinking of Otama! Luffy's Furious Strike!"; Transliteration: "O-Tama e no Omoi – Rufi Ikari no Ichigeki" (Japanese: お玉への思い ルフィ怒りの一撃)	Katsumi Tokoro	Shinzō Fujita	Kazuya Hisada	August 1, 2021
986	95	"Fighting Music! An Ability That Harms Luffy!"; Transliteration: "Tatakau Myūjikku! Rufi o Osou Nōryoku!" (Japanese: 戦う音楽！ルフィを襲う能力！)	Shigeyasu Yamauchi	Hitoshi Tanaka	Majiro & LEE	August 8, 2021
987	96	"His Dream Broken?! The Trap That Lures Sanji!"; Transliteration: "Yume Yabureru!? Sanji o Izanau Wana!" (Japanese: 夢やぶれる!? サンジを誘う罠！)	Yutaka Nakashima	Tomohiro Nakayama	Kenji Yokoyama	August 15, 2021
988	97	"Reinforcements Arrive! The Commander of the Whitebeard Pirates!"; Transliteration: "Engun Tōchaku! Shirohige Kaizokudan Taichō!" (Japanese: 援軍到着！白ひげ海賊団隊長！)	Tasuku Shimaya	Shōji Yonemura	Shūichi Itō	August 22, 2021
989	98	"The Pact Between Men! The Fierce Fighting of Brachio Tank!"; Transliteration: "Otoko no Chikai! Gekitō Burakio Tanku" (Japanese: 漢の誓い！激闘ブラキオタンク)	Kōhei Kureta	Ryo Yamazaki	Kimitaka Itō	August 29, 2021
990	99	"Thunder Bagua! Here Comes Kaido's Son!"; Transliteration: "Raimei Hakke! Tōjō Kaidō no Musuko" (Japanese: 雷鳴八卦！登場カイドウの息子)	Tatsuya Nagamine	Atsuhiro Tomioka	Masahiro Kitazaki & Yong-Ce Tu	September 5, 2021
991	100	"Enemy or Ally? Luffy and Yamato!"; Transliteration: "Teki ka? Mikata ka? Rufi to Yamato" (Japanese: 敵か？味方か？ルフィとヤマト)	Directed by : Yusuke Suzuki; Storyboarded by : Shigeyasu Yamauchi	Akiko Inoue	Toshio Deguchi & Keita Saitō	September 12, 2021
992	101	"Desire to be Oden! Yamato's Dream!"; Transliteration: "Oden ni Naritai – Yamato no Omoi" (Japanese: おでんになりたい ヤマトの思い)	Directed by : Toshihiro Maeya; Storyboarded by : Yutaka Nakashima & Aya Komaki	Shinzō Fujita	Shinichi Suzuki	September 19, 2021
993	102	"Explosive?! The Handcuffs that Shackle Yamato's Freedom!"; Transliteration: "Bakuhatsu!? Yamato no Jiyū o Shibaru Jō!" (Japanese: 爆発!? ヤマトの自由を縛る錠！)	Masahiro Hosoda	Hitoshi Tanaka	Masayuki Takagi	September 26, 2021
994	103	"The Akazaya Face-off! Kikunojo vs. Kanjuro!"; Transliteration: "Akazaya Ikkiuchi – Kikunojō tai Kanjūrō" (Japanese: 赤鞘一騎打ち 菊之丞VSカン十郎)	Yasunori Koyama	Tomohiro Nakayama	Masahiro Shimanuki	October 3, 2021
995	104	"Raid! Inheriting Oden's Will"; Transliteration: "Uchiiri! Uketsugu Oden no Ishi" (Japanese: 討入り！受け継ぐおでんの意志)	Satoshi Itō	Shōji Yonemura	Shigefumi Shingaki	October 10, 2021
996	105	"Onigashima in Tumult! Luffy's All-Out War Begins!"; Transliteration: "Onigashima Gekidō – Rufi Zenmen Sensō Kaishi" (Japanese: 鬼ヶ島激動 ルフィ全面戦争開始)	Yutaka Nakashima	Ryo Yamazaki	Kazuya Hisada	October 24, 2021
997	106	"The Battle Under the Moon! The Berserker, Sulong the Moon Lion!"; Transliteration: "Gekka no Tatakai – Kyōsenshi "Sūron"" (Japanese: 月下の戦い 狂戦士"月の獅子")	Katsumi Tokoro	Akiko Inoue	Kenji Yokoyama	October 31, 2021
998	107	"Zeus' Treason?! The Cornered Nami!"; Transliteration: "Zeusu no Hangyaku!? Nami Zettai Zetsumei!" (Japanese: ゼウスの反逆!? ナミ絶体絶命！)	Kenichi Takeshita	Shinzō Fujita	Shūichi Itō	November 7, 2021
999	108	"I'll Protect You! Yamato Meets Momonosuke!"; Transliteration: "Kimi o Mamoru – Kaikō Yamato to Momonosuke" (Japanese: 君を守る 邂逅ヤマトとモモの助)	Yusuke Suzuki	Hitoshi Tanaka	Kimitaka Itō & Toshio Deguchi	November 14, 2021
1000	109	"Overwhelming Strength! The Straw Hats Come Together!"; Transliteration: "Attōteki Senryoku! Mugiwara no Ichimi Shūketsu" (Japanese: 圧倒的戦力！麦わらの一味集結)	Directed by : Kōhei Kureta; Storyboarded by : Aya Komaki & Kōhei Kureta	Shōji Yonemura	Yong-Ce Tu, Midori Matsuda & Keiichi Ichikawa	November 21, 2021
1001	110	"A Risky Invitation! A Plot to Eliminate Queen!"; Transliteration: "Kiken na Sasoi! Kuīn Massatsu Keikaku" (Japanese: 危険な誘い！クイーン抹殺計画)	Tasuku Shimaya	Tomohiro Nakayama	Keita Saitō & Masahiro Kitazaki	November 28, 2021
1002	111	"A New Rivalry! Nami and Ulti!"; Transliteration: "Arata na Innen! Nami to Uruti!" (Japanese: 新たな因縁！ナミとうるティ！)	Directed by : Toshihiro Maeya; Storyboarded by : Yutaka Nakashima	Ryo Yamazaki	Shinichi Suzuki	December 5, 2021
1003	112	"A Heroic Blade! Akazaya vs. Kaido, Again Once More!"; Transliteration: "Hisō no Yaiba! Akazaya tai Kaidō Futatabi" (Japanese: 悲壮の刃！赤鞘VSカイドウ再び)	Directed by : Nanami Michibata; Storyboarded by : Masahiro Hosoda, Nanami Michibata & Tatsuya Nagamine	Atsuhiro Tomioka	Masayuki Takagi	December 12, 2021
1004	113	"An Inherited Technique! Unleashing Oden's Secret Swordplay!"; Transliteration: "Uketsugishi Waza – Sakuretsu Oden no Hiken" (Japanese: 受け継ぎし技 炸裂おでんの秘剣)	Masahiro Shimanuki	Akiko Inoue	Yasunori Koyama	December 19, 2021
1005	114	"The Power of Ice Oni! A New Version of the Plague Rounds!"; Transliteration: "「Kōri Oni」no Iryoku! Arata na Ekisaito Dan" (Japanese: 「氷鬼」の威力！新たな疫災弾)	Directed by : Shō Inuzuka; Storyboarded by : Yutaka Nakashima	Shinzō Fujita	Shigefumi Shingaki	January 9, 2022
1006	115	"I Won't Forgive Him! Chopper's Determination!"; Transliteration: "Yurusanē! Choppā no Ketsui!" (Japanese: 許さねェ！チョッパーの決意！)	Directed by : Ryōsuke Tanaka; Storyboarded by : Ryōsuke Tanaka & Tatsuya Nagamine	Hitoshi Tanaka	Kazuya Hisada	January 16, 2022
1007	116	"Zoro's Pursuit! Ice Oni Tag!"; Transliteration: "Zoro no Tsuigeki! Kōri Oni in Onigokko" (Japanese: ゾロの追撃！氷鬼in鬼ゴッコ)	Katsumi Tokoro	Tomohiro Nakayama	Kenji Yokoyama	January 23, 2022
1008	117	"Nami Surrenders?! Ulti's Fierce Headbutt!"; Transliteration: "Nami Kōfuku!? Uruti no Mō-zutsuki" (Japanese: ナミ降伏!? うるティの猛頭突き)	Directed by : Tasuku Shimaya; Storyboarded by : Yutaka Nakashima & Tasuku Shimaya	Shōji Yonemura	Shūichi Itō	January 30, 2022
1009	118	"Sasaki's Onslaught! Armored Division vs. Yamato!"; Transliteration: "Sasaki no Mōkō – Sōkōbutai tai Yamato" (Japanese: ササキの猛攻 装甲部隊VSヤマト)	Yusuke Suzuki	Ryo Yamazaki	Toshio Deguchi & Kimitaka Itō	February 6, 2022
1010	119	"Eliminate the Ice Oni! Chopper's Fire Trick!"; Transliteration: "Kōri Oni o Yabure – Choppā no Hisaku!" (Japanese: 氷鬼を破れ チョッパーの火策！)	Kōhei Kureta	Akiko Inoue	Midori Matsuda & Kazuya Hisada	February 13, 2022
1011	120	"It's Not Okay! The Spider Lures Sanji!"; Transliteration: "Yokanē yo!! Sanji o Sasou Kumo" (Japanese: よかねェよ!! サンジを誘う蜘蛛)	Masahiro Hosoda	Shinzō Fujita	Keita Saitō, Masahiro Kitazaki & Shigenori Taniguchi	February 20, 2022
1012	121	"A Turnaround Move! The Flames of Marco the Phoenix!"; Transliteration: "Gyakuten no Itte! Fushichō Maruko no Honō" (Japanese: 逆転の一手！不死鳥マルコの炎)	Directed by : Toshihiro Maeya; Storyboarded by : Yutaka Nakashima	Hitoshi Tanaka	Shinichi Suzuki	February 27, 2022
1013	122	"Yamato's Past! The Man Who Came for an Emperor of the Sea!"; Transliteration: "Yamato no Kako – Yonkō no Kubi o Nerau Otoko" (Japanese: ヤマトの過去 四皇の首を狙う男)	Ryōta Nakamura	Tomohiro Nakayama	Masayuki Takagi	March 6, 2022
1014	123	"Marco's Tears! The Bond of the Whitebeard Pirates!"; Transliteration: "Maruko no Namida! Shirohige Kaizokudan no Kizuna" (Japanese: マルコの涙！白ひげ海賊団の絆)	Katsumi Tokoro	Shōji Yonemura	Masahiro Shimanuki	April 17, 2022
1015	124	"Straw Hat Luffy! The Man Who Will Become the King of the Pirates!"; Transliteration: "Mugiwara no Rufi – Kaizoku Ō ni Naru Otoko" (Japanese: 麦わらのルフィ 海賊王になる男)	Megumi Ishitani	Ryo Yamazaki	Keisuke Mori & Kimitaka Itō	April 24, 2022
1016	125	"The Battle of the Monsters! The Three Stubborn Captains!"; Transliteration: "Kaibutsu Kessen! Iji Hariau San Senchō" (Japanese: 怪物決戦！意地張りあう三船長)	Directed by : Yasunori Koyama; Storyboarded by : Yutaka Nakashima	Atsuhiro Tomioka	Shigefumi Shingaki	May 8, 2022
1017	126	"A Barrage of Powerful Techniques! The Fierce Attacks of the Worst Generation!"; Transliteration: "Ōwaza Renpatsu! Saiaku no Sedai no Mōkō!" (Japanese: 大技連発！最悪の世代の猛攻！)	Directed by : Kōhei Kureta & Nanami Michibata; Storyboarded by : Satoshi Itō, Tatsuya Nagamine, Henry Thurlow, Nanami Michibata & Katsumi Ishizuka	Akiko Inoue	Yong-Ce Tu	May 15, 2022
1018	127	"Kaido Laughs! The Emperors of the Sea vs. New Generation!"; Transliteration: "Warau Kaidō! Yonkō tai Shin Sedai!" (Japanese: 笑うカイドウ！四皇VS新世代！)	Kenichi Takeshita	Shinzō Fujita	Kenji Yokoyama	May 22, 2022
1019	128	"Otama's Secret Plan! Operation Kibi Dango!"; Transliteration: "Otama no Hisaku! Kibi Dango Dai Sakusen" (Japanese: お玉の秘策！きびだんご大作戦)	Ryōsuke Tanaka	Hitoshi Tanaka	Keita Saitō & Toshio Deguchi	May 29, 2022
1020	129	"Sanji's Scream! An SOS Echoes Over the Island!"; Transliteration: "Sanji Zekkyō! Shimajū ni Hibiku Esu Ō Esu" (Japanese: サンジ絶叫！島中に響くSOS)	Tasuku Shimaya	Tomohiro Nakayama	Kazuya Hisada	June 5, 2022
1021	130	"Spank Strikes! Sanji's Woman-trouble!"; Transliteration: "Supanku Sakutersu! Sanji no Jonan!" (Japanese: スパンク炸裂！サンジの女難！)	Masahiro Hosoda	Atsuhiro Tomioka	Shūichi Itō	June 12, 2022
1022	131	"No Regrets! Luffy and Boss, a Master-Disciple Bond!"; Transliteration: "Kui Nashi – Rufi to Oyabun Shitei no Kizuna" (Japanese: 悔いなし ルフィと親分師弟の絆)	Directed by : Yusuke Suzuki; Storyboarded by : Yusuke Suzuki & Yutaka Nakashima	Ryo Yamazaki	Masayuki Takagi	June 19, 2022
1023	132	"All Set! Chopperhage Nebulizer!"; Transliteration: "Junbi Ōkē! Chopafāji Neburaizā" (Japanese: 準備OK! チョパファージ霧砲(ネブライザー))	Directed by : Toshihiro Maeya; Storyboarded by : Yutaka Nakashima	Atsuhiro Tomioka	Shinichi Suzuki	July 3, 2022
1024	133	"Oden Appears! The Confused Hearts of the Akazaya Members!"; Transliteration: "Oden Arawaru! Yureru Akazaya no Kokoro!" (Japanese: おでん現る！揺れる赤鞘の心！)	Directed by : Shō Inuzuka; Storyboarded by : Yutaka Nakashima	Akiko Inoue	Masahiro Shimanuki	July 10, 2022
1025	134	"The Worst Generation Gets Wiped Out?! The Emperors' Deadly Attack!"; Transliteration: "Saiaku no Sedai Zenmetsu!? Yonkō no Ōwaza!" (Japanese: 最悪の世代全滅!? 四皇の大技！)	Katsumi Tokoro	Shinzō Fujita	Shigefumi Shingaki	July 17, 2022
1026	135	"The Supernovas Strike Back! The Mission to Tear Apart the Emperors!"; Transliteration: "Chōshinsei Hangeki! Yonkō Bunkai Sakusen" (Japanese: 超新星反撃！四皇分解作戦)	Ryōta Nakamura	Hitoshi Tanaka	Masahiro Kitazaki, Kimitaka Itō, Yong-Ce Tu & Toshio Deguchi	July 24, 2022
1027	136	"Defend Luffy! Zoro and Law's Sword Technique!"; Transliteration: "Rufi o Mamore! Zoro to Rō no Kengi" (Japanese: ルフィを守れ！ゾロとローの剣技)	Tatsuya Nagamine	Tomohiro Nakayama	Midori Matsuda & Keita Saitō	July 31, 2022
1028	137	"Surpass the Emperor of the Sea! Luffy Strikes Back with an Iron Fist!"; Transliteration: "Yonkō o Koero – Rufi Hangeki no Tekken" (Japanese: 四皇を超えろ ルフィ反撃の鉄拳)	Yasunori Koyama	Shōji Yonemura	Kazuya Hisada	August 7, 2022
Uta's Past
1029	138	"A Faint Memory! Luffy and Red-Haired's Daughter Uta!"; Transliteration: "Awai Kioku – Rufi to Akagami no Musume Uta" (Japanese: 淡い記憶 ルフィと赤髪の娘ウタ)	Shigeyasu Yamauchi	Akiko Inoue	Shaolei Li	August 14, 2022
1030	139	"A Pledge for the Next Genesis! Luffy and Uta!"; Transliteration: "Shin Jidai no Chikai! Rufi to Uta" (Japanese: 新時代の誓い！ルフィとウタ)	Katsumi Tokoro	Ryo Yamazaki	Kenji Yokoyama	August 21, 2022
Wano Country
1031	140	"Nami Screams – A Deadly Death Race!"; Transliteration: "Nami Zekkyō – Zettai Zetsumei Desu Rēsu!" (Japanese: ナミ絶叫 絶体絶命デスレース！)	Satoshi Itō	Ryo Yamazaki	Shūichi Itō	September 4, 2022
1032	141	"The Dawn of the Land of Wano – The All-Out Battle Heats Up!"; Transliteration: "Wano Kuni no Yoake – Zenmen Taiketsu Gekika!" (Japanese: ワノ国の夜明け 全面対決激化！)	Directed by : Tasuku Shimaya; Storyboarded by : Yutaka Nakashima & Tasuku Shimaya	Atsuhiro Tomioka	Masayuki Takagi	September 11, 2022
1033	142	"The Conclusion! Luffy, Accelerating Fist of the Conqueror"; Transliteration: "Ketchaku! Rufi Kasoku Suru Haō no Kobushi" (Japanese: 決着！ルフィ加速する覇王の拳)	Ryōsuke Tanaka	Akiko Inoue	Masahiro Kitazaki, Kimitaka Itō & Yong-Ce Tu	September 18, 2022
1034	143	"Luffy, Defeated! The Straw Hats in Jeopardy?!"; Transliteration: "Rufi Haiboku! Mugiwara no Ichimi Kyūchi!?" (Japanese: ルフィ敗北！麦わらの一味窮地!?)	Satohiko Sano	Shinzō Fujita	Masahiko Inuzuka & Satohiko Sano	September 25, 2022
1035	144	"The Beasts Trample Down! The End of the Kouzuki Family!"; Transliteration: "Hyakujū Jūrin! Kōzuki-ke no Shūen!" (Japanese: 百獣蹂躙！光月家の終焉！)	Directed by : Shō Inuzuka; Storyboarded by : Yutaka Nakashima	Hitoshi Tanaka	Masahiro Shimanuki	October 2, 2022
1036	145	"Fight Against the Dark Night – The Commander-in-chief of the Land of Wano Sounds Off"; Transliteration: "Yamiyo ni Aragae – Wano Kuni Sōdaishō Hoeru" (Japanese: 闇夜に抗え ワノ国総大将吠える)	Yusuke Suzuki	Tomohiro Nakayama	Shigefumi Shingaki	October 16, 2022
1037	146	"Believe in Luffy! The Alliance's Counterattack Begins!"; Transliteration: "Rufi o Shinjiro! Dōmei Hangeki Kaishi!" (Japanese: ルフィを信じろ！同盟反撃開始！)	Masahiro Hosoda	Shōji Yonemura	Keita Saitō & Toshio Deguchi	October 23, 2022
1038	147	"Nami's Lethal Attack! Otama's Desperate Challenge!"; Transliteration: "Nami Hissatsu! Otama Kesshi no Ōichiban!" (Japanese: ナミ必殺！お玉決死の大一番！)	Directed by : Nanami Michibata; Storyboarded by : Kōhei Kureta & Nanami Michibata	Ryo Yamazaki	Kazuya Hisada	October 30, 2022
1039	148	"A Dramatic Increase of Allies! Straw Hats Fight Back!"; Transliteration: "Mikata Gekizō! Mugiwara no Ichimi Gyakushū!" (Japanese: 味方激増！麦わらの一味逆襲！)	Kenichi Takeshita	Atsuhiro Tomioka	Kenji Yokoyama	November 6, 2022
1040	149	"The Pride of a Helmsman? The Enraged Jimbei!"; Transliteration: "Sōdashu no Hokori – Ikari no Jinbē!" (Japanese: 操舵手の誇り 怒りのジンベエ！)	Katsumi Tokoro	Akiko Inoue	Shūichi Itō	November 13, 2022
1041	150	"Showdown Battles of the Monsters! Yamato and Franky"; Transliteration: "Kaijū Dai Kessen! Yamato to Furankī" (Japanese: 怪獣大決戦！ヤマトとフランキー)	Directed by : Tasuku Shimaya; Storyboarded by : Yutaka Nakashima & Tasuku Shimaya	Shinzō Fujita	Masayuki Takagi	November 20, 2022
1042	151	"The Predator's Trap - Black Maria's Temptation"; Transliteration: "Hoshokusha no Wana - Burakku Maria no Yūwaku" (Japanese: 捕食者の罠 ブラックマリアの誘惑)	Shigeyasu Yamauchi	Hitoshi Tanaka	Shaolei Li, Takuya Imakado, Mami Kotoku & Zhenlei Cheng	November 27, 2022
1043	152	"Slash the Nightmare - Brook Draws His Freezing Sword!"; Transliteration: "Akumu o Kiru - Burukku no Kōri no Battō!" (Japanese: 悪夢を斬る ブルックの氷の抜刀！)	Directed by : Shō Matsui; Storyboarded by : Yutaka Nakashima	Tomohiro Nakayama	Masahiro Kitazaki	December 4, 2022
1044	153	"Clutch! A Demon Incarnate, Robin!"; Transliteration: "Kuratchi! Akuma no Keshin - Robin!" (Japanese: クラッチ！悪魔の化身 ロビン！)	Yasunori Koyama	Shōji Yonemura	Masahiro Shimanuki & Ziwei He	December 11, 2022
1045	154	"A Spell! Kid and Zoro Facing Threats!"; Transliteration: "Jubaku! Semaru Kyōi - Kiddo to Zoro!" (Japanese: 呪縛！迫る脅威 キッドとゾロ！)	Yūji Tokuno	Atsuhiro Tomioka	Shigefumi Shingaki	December 18, 2022
1046	155	"Taking a Chance! The Two Arms Go into Battle!"; Transliteration: "Ichikabachika no Ōshōbu! Ryōyoku Shutsujin!" (Japanese: 一か八かの大勝負！両翼出陣！)	Shō Inuzuka	Shinzō Fujita	Keita Saitō & Toshio Deguchi	January 8, 2023
1047	156	"Ascend to the Dawn! A Pink Dragon Gets Agitated"; Transliteration: "Yoake e to Nobore! Momoiro no Ryū Takeru" (Japanese: 夜明けへと昇れ！桃色の龍猛る)	Yutaka Nakashima	Hitoshi Tanaka	Kazuya Hisada	January 15, 2023
1048	157	"For the Future! Yamato and the Great Swordsmen's Pledge"; Transliteration: "Mirai e! Yamato to Dai Kengō no Chikai" (Japanese: 未来へ！ヤマトと大剣豪の誓い)	Ryōsuke Tanaka	Tomohiro Nakayama	Kenji Yokoyama	January 22, 2023
1049	158	"Luffy Soars! Revenge Against the King of the Beasts"; Transliteration: "Rufi Hishō! Hyakujū e no Ribenji" (Japanese: ルフィ飛翔！百獣へのリベンジ)	Yusuke Suzuki	Shōji Yonemura	Shūichi Itō	January 29, 2023
1050	159	"Two Dragons Face Off! Momonosuke's Determination!"; Transliteration: "Sōryū Aiutsu! Momonosuke no Kakugo!" (Japanese: 双竜相搏つ！モモの助の覚悟！)	Masahiro Hosoda	Ryo Yamazaki	Masayuki Takagi	February 5, 2023
1051	160	"A Legend All Over Again! Luffy's Fist Roars in the Sky"; Transliteration: "Densetsu no Sairai! Ten ni Todoroku Rufi no Kobushi" (Japanese: 伝説の再来！天に轟くルフィの拳)	Wataru Matsumi	Atsuhiro Tomioka	Masahiro Kitazaki	February 12, 2023
1052	161	"The Situation Has Grown Tense! The End of Onigashima!"; Transliteration: "Fūun Kyū o Tsugeru! Onigashima no Matsuro!" (Japanese: 風雲急を告げる！鬼ヶ島の末路！)	Tasuku Shimaya	Akiko Inoue	Masahiro Shimanuki	February 19, 2023
1053	162	"Sanji's Mutation? The Two Arms in Crisis!"; Transliteration: "Sanji no Ihen - Ryōyoku Kiiro Shingō!" (Japanese: サンジの異変 両翼黄色信号！)	Katsumi Tokoro	Shinzō Fujita	Shigefumi Shingaki	February 26, 2023
1054	163	"Death to Your Partner! Killer's Deadly Gamble!"; Transliteration: "Aibō ni Shi o! Kirā Kesshi no Ōbakuchi" (Japanese: 相棒に死を！キラー決死の大博打)	Directed by : Yūji Tokuno & Yasunori Koyama; Storyboarded by : Yutaka Nakashima	Hitoshi Tanaka	Keita Saitō & Toshio Deguchi	March 19, 2023
1055	164	"A Shadowy Figure Pulls the Strings! Onigashima in Flames"; Transliteration: "Yami no Mono no An'yaku! Onigashima Enjō" (Japanese: 闇の者の暗躍！鬼ヶ島炎上)	Directed by : Hazuki Omoya; Storyboarded by : Kenichi Takeshita & Hazuki Omoya	Tomohiro Nakayama	Kazuya Hisada	March 26, 2023
1056	165	"A Countercharge! Law and Kid's Return-Attack Combination"; Transliteration: "Gyakushū! Rō to Kiddo no Hangeki Dōmei" (Japanese: 逆襲！ローとキッドの反撃同盟)	Directed by : Shō Matsui; Storyboarded by : Yutaka Nakashima	Shōji Yonemura	Masahiro Kitazaki & Kimitaka Itō	April 2, 2023
1057	166	"For Luffy - Sanji and Zoro's Oath"; Transliteration: "Rufi no Tame ni - Sanji to Zoro no Chikai" (Japanese: ルフィの為に サンジとゾロの誓い)	Directed by : Nanami Michibata; Storyboarded by : Nanami Michibata & Satoshi Itō	Ryo Yamazaki	Kenji Yokoyama	April 9, 2023
1058	167	"The Onslaught of Kazenbo - Orochi's Evil Clutches Close in" Transliteration: "Kazenbō Shūrai - Semaru Orochi no Ma no Te" (Japanese: 火前坊襲来 迫るオロチの魔の手)	Shō Inuzuka	Atsuhiro Tomioka	Shūichi Itō	April 16, 2023
1059	168	"Zoro Faces Adversity - A Monster! King the Wildfire"; Transliteration: "Gyakkyō no Zoro - Kaibutsu! Kasai no Kingu" (Japanese: 逆境のゾロ 怪物！火災のキング)	Yusuke Suzuki	Akiko Inoue	Masayuki Takagi	April 23, 2023
1060	169	"The Secret of Enma! The Cursed Sword Entrusted to Zoro"; Transliteration: "Enma no Himitsu! Zoro ni Takusareshi Yōtō" (Japanese: 閻魔の秘密！ゾロに託されし妖刀)	Directed by : Tasuku Shimaya; Storyboarded by : Tatsuya Nagamine & Wataru Matsumi	Shinzō Fujita	Midori Matsuda & Masahiro Shimanuki	April 30, 2023
1061	170	"The Strike of an Ifrit! Sanji vs. Queen"; Transliteration: "Majin no Ichigeki! Sanji tai Kuīn" (Japanese: 魔神の一撃！サンジVSクイーン)	Ryōta Nakamura	Hitoshi Tanaka	Shigefumi Shingaki & Yong-Ce Tu	May 7, 2023
1062	171	"The Three-Sword Style of the Conqueror! Zoro vs. King"; Transliteration: "Haō no Santōryū! Zoro tai Kingu" (Japanese: 覇王の三刀流！ゾロVSキング)	Directed by : Ryōsuke Tanaka; Storyboarded by : Ryōsuke Tanaka & Katsumi Ishizuka	Tomohiro Nakayama	Keita Saitō, Midori Matsuda & Katsumi Ishizuka	May 21, 2023
1063	172	"Luffy is on the Move! A Turning Point to a New Era!"; Transliteration: "Rufi Yakudō! Shin Jidai no Bunkiten!" (Japanese: ルフィ躍動！新時代の分岐点！)	Masahiro Hosoda	Shōji Yonemura	Toshio Deguchi	May 28, 2023
1064	173	"Drunken Dragon Bagua! The Lawless Dragon Closing in on Luffy"; Transliteration: "Shuron Hakke! Rufi ni Semaru Muhō no Ryū" (Japanese: 酒龍八卦！ルフィに迫る無法の龍)	Katsumi Tokoro	Ryo Yamazaki	Kazuya Hisada	June 4, 2023
1065	174	"The Destruction of the Alliance?! Fire up, the Will of the New Generation!"; Transliteration: "Dōmei Kaimetsu!? Moero Shin Sedai no Ishi!" (Japanese: 同盟壊滅!? 燃えろ新世代の意志！)	Hazuki Omoya	Atsuhiro Tomioka	Shigefumi Shingaki & Kimitaka Itō	June 11, 2023
1066	175	"Here Comes Main Act! Powerful Techniques of Shockwave and Magnetism"; Transliteration: "Ōtori Kitaru! Hadō to Jiki no Ōwaza" (Japanese: 大トリ来る！波動と磁気の大技)	Henry Thurlow	Akiko Inoue	Masahiro Kitazaki	June 25, 2023
1067	176	"To the New Era! Settled! The Determination of the Brats"; Transliteration: "Shin Jidai e! Ketchaku! Gaki-domo no Kakugo" (Japanese: 新時代へ！決着！ガキ共の覚悟)	Kenichi Takeshita	Shinzō Fujita	Kenji Yokoyama	July 2, 2023
1068	177	"Moon Princess Echoes! The Final Phase of the Land of Wano!"; Transliteration: "Tsukihime ga Hibiku! Wano Kuni Saishū Kyokumen!" (Japanese: 月姫が響く！ワノ国最終局面！)	Directed by : Shō Matsui; Storyboarded by : Yutaka Nakashima & Shō Matsui	Hitoshi Tanaka	Masahiro Shimanuki & Toshio Deguchi	July 9, 2023
1069	178	"There is Only One Winner - Luffy vs. Kaido"; Transliteration: "Shōsha wa Hitori - Rufi tai Kaidō" (Japanese: 勝者はひとり ルフィVSカイドウ)	Directed by : Shō Inuzuka; Storyboarded by : Toshinori Fukuzawa & Shō Inuzuka	Tomohiro Nakayama	Masayuki Takagi	July 16, 2023
1070	179	"Luffy is Defeated?! The Determination of Those Left Behind"; Transliteration: "Rufi Haiboku!? Nokosareta Mono no Kakugo" (Japanese: ルフィ敗北!? 残された者の覚悟)	Yusuke Suzuki	Ryo Yamazaki	Shūichi Itō	July 30, 2023
1071	180	"Luffy's Peak - Attained! Fifth Gear"; Transliteration: "Rufi no Saikō Chiten - Tōtatsu!〝Gia Fifusu〟" (Japanese: ルフィの最高地点 到達！〝ギア5〟)	Tatsuya Nagamine	Atsuhiro Tomioka	Midori Matsuda & Keita Saitō	August 6, 2023
1072	181	"The Ridiculous Power! Fifth Gear in Full Play"; Transliteration: "Fuzaketa Nōryoku! Yakudō Suru Gia Fifusu" (Japanese: ふざけた能力！躍動するギア5)	Directed by : Tasuku Shimaya; Storyboarded by : Tasuku Shimaya, Megumi Ishitani, Bahi JD, Yong-Ce Tu & Takeshi Maenami	Akiko Inoue	Nobuyuki Iwai, Keisuke Mori, Kimitaka Itō & Shigefumi Shingaki	August 13, 2023
1073	182	"No Way Out! A Hellish Scene on Onigashima"; Transliteration: "Nigeba Nashi! Jigoku Ezu no Onigashima" (Japanese: 逃げ場なし！地獄絵図の鬼ヶ島)	Katsumi Tokoro	Shinzō Fujita	Mamoru Yokota	August 20, 2023
1074	183	"I Trust Momo - Luffy's Final Powerful Technique!"; Transliteration: "Momo o Shinjiru - Rufi Saigo no Ōwaza!" (Japanese: モモを信じる ルフィ最後の大技！)	Directed by : Nanami Michibata; Storyboarded by : Masahiro Hosoda & Hone Hone	Hitoshi Tanaka	Kazuya Hisada, Hone Hone & Shū Sugita	September 3, 2023
1075	184	"20 Years Worth of Prayers! Take Back the Land of Wano"; Transliteration: "Nijū-nen no Inori! Wano Kuni o Torimodose" (Japanese: 二十年の祈り！ワノ国を取り戻せ)	Yasunori Koyama	Tomohiro Nakayama	Yong-Ce Tu & Masahiro Kitazaki	September 10, 2023
1076	185	"The World That Luffy Wants!"; Transliteration: "Rufi no Mezasu Sekai!" (Japanese: ルフィの目指す世界！)	Satoshi Itō	Shōji Yonemura	Yong-Ce Tu & Ziwei He	September 17, 2023
1077	186	"The Curtain Falls! The Winner, Straw Hat Luffy!"; Transliteration: "Makuhiki! Shōsha - Mugiwara no Rufi!" (Japanese: 幕引き！勝者 麦わらのルフィ！)	Hazuki Omoya	Ryo Yamazaki	Toshio Deguchi & Masahiro Shimanuki	September 24, 2023
1078	187	"He Returns! The Shogun of the Land of Wano, Kozuki Momonosuke"; Transliteration: "Kikan! Wano Kuni Shōgun - Kōzuki Momonosuke" (Japanese: 帰還！ワノ国将軍 光月モモの助)	Toshinori Fukuzawa	Atsuhiro Tomioka	Kenji Yokoyama	October 1, 2023
1079	188	"The Morning Comes! Luffy and the Others Rest!"; Transliteration: "Asa ga Kita! Rufi-tachi no Kyūsoku!" (Japanese: 朝が来た！ルフィ達の休息！)	Yusuke Suzuki	Akiko Inoue	Masayuki Takagi	October 15, 2023
1080	189	"A Celebration Banquet! The New Emperors of the Sea!"; Transliteration: "Shukusai no Utage! Atarashiki Umi no Kōtei-tachi!" (Japanese: 祝祭の宴！新しき海の皇帝達！)	Ryota Nakamura	Shinzō Fujita	Shuichi Ito & Toshio Deguchi	October 22, 2023
1081	190	"The World Will Burn! The Onslaught of a Navy Admiral!"; Transliteration: "Sekai ga Moeru! Kaigun Taishō Shūrai!" (Japanese: 世界が燃える！海軍大将襲来！)	Sho Matsui	Hitoshi Tanaka	Shigefumi Shingaki	October 29, 2023
1082	191	"The Coming of the New Era! The Red-Haired's Imperial Rage"; Transliteration: "Shin Jidai Tōrai! Akagami no Kōtei no Ikari" (Japanese: 新時代到来！赤髪の皇帝の怒り)	Sho Inuzuka	Tomohiro Nakayama	Keita Saito & Kimitaka Ito	November 5, 2023
1083	192	"The World That Moves On! A New Organization, Cross Guild"; Transliteration: "Ugoku Sekai! Shin Soshiki Kurosu Girudo" (Japanese: 動く世界！新組織クロスギルド)	Katsumi Tokoro	Shōji Yonemura	Kazuya Hisada	November 12, 2023
1084	193	"Time to Depart - The Land of Wano and the Straw Hats"; Transliteration: "Tabidachi no Toki - Wano kuni to Mugiwara no Ichimi" (Japanese: 旅立ちの時 ワノ国と麦わらの一味)	Kenichi Takeshita	Shōji Yonemura	Masahiro Kitazaki	November 19, 2023
1085	194	"The Last Curtain! Luffy and Momonosuke's Vow"; Transliteration: "Shūmaku! Rufi to Momonosuke no Chikai" (Japanese: 終幕！ルフィとモモの助の誓い)	Toshinori Fukuzawa	Ryo Yamazaki	Mamoru Yokota	November 26, 2023
Prologue to Egghead
1086	195	"A New Emperor! Buggy the Genius Jester!"; Transliteration: "Shin Kōtei! Senryō Dōke no Bagī!" (Japanese: 新皇帝！千両道化のバギー！)	Directed by : Tasuku Shimaya; Storyboarded by : Nozomu Shishido	Atsuhiro Tomioka	Masahiro Shimanuki	December 3, 2023
1087	196	"The War on the Island of Women! A Case Involving Koby the Hero"; Transliteration: "Nyōgashima no Ran! Eiyū Kobī no Ikken" (Japanese: 女ヶ島の乱！英雄コビーの一件)	Hazuki Omoya	Akiko Inoue	Yong-Ce Tu & Toshio Deguchi	December 10, 2023
1088	197	"Luffy's Dream"; Transliteration: "Rufi no Yume" (Japanese: ルフィの夢)	Tatsuya Nagamine	Shinzō Fujita	Kenji Yokoyama	December 17, 2023

=== Season 21: Egghead (2024–25) ===
No. overall	No. in season	Title	Directed by	Written by	Animation directed by	Original release date	Viewership rating (Note: Viewership numbers reflect the Japanese TV animation weekly ratings in the Kantō region.)
1089	1	"Entering a New Chapter! Luffy and Sabo's Paths!"; Transliteration: "Shinshō Totsunyū! Rufi to Sabo no Shinro!" (Japanese: 新章突入！ルフィとサボの針路！)	Nozomu Shishido	Jin Tanaka	Ziwei He, Keisuke Mori, Shūichi Itō & Midori Matsuda	January 7, 2024	3.3%
1090	2	"A New Island! Future Island Egghead"; Transliteration: "Atarashī Shima! Mirai Shima Egguheddo" (Japanese: 新しい島！未来島エッグヘッド)	Yusuke Suzuki	Tomohiro Nakayama	Masayuki Takagi	January 14, 2024	3.7%
1091	3	"Brimming with the Future! An Adventure on the Island of Science!"; Transliteration: "Mirai Mansai! Kagaku no Kuni no Bōken!" (Japanese: 未来満載！科学の国の冒険！)	Directed by : Shō Matsui; Storyboarded by : Shō Matsui, Yasunori Koyama & Satoshi Itō	Shōji Yonemura	Keita Saitō & Kimitaka Itō	January 21, 2024	3.2%
1092	4	"Bonney's Lamentation! Darkness Lurking on the Future Island"; Transliteration: "Bonī no Dōkoku! Mirai Shima ni Hisomu Yami" (Japanese: ボニーの慟哭！未来島に潜む闇)	Katsumi Tokoro	Ryo Yamazaki	Shigefumi Shingaki	January 28, 2024	3.5%
1093	5	"The Winner Takes All! Law vs. Blackbeard!"; Transliteration: "Shōsha Sōtori! Rō tai Kurohige!" (Japanese: 勝者総取り！ローVS(たい)黒ひげ！)	Shō Inuzuka	Atsuhiro Tomioka	Kazuya Hisada & Katsumi Ishizuka	February 11, 2024	2.9%
1094	6	"The Mystery Deepens! Egghead Labophase"; Transliteration: "Fukamaru Nazo! Egguheddo Rabofēzu" (Japanese: 深まる謎！エッグヘッド研究層(ラボフェーズ))	Yasuhiro Tanabe	Akiko Inoue	Masahiro Kitazaki	February 18, 2024	3.1%
1095	7	"The Brain of a Genius - Six Vegapunks!"; Transliteration: "Tensai no Zunō - Roku-nin no Begapanku!" (Japanese: 天才の頭脳 6(ろく)人のベガパンク！)	Directed by : Eri Hyun; Storyboarded by : Masahiro Hosoda & Satoshi Itō	Shinzō Fujita	Toshio Deguchi, RA Craft & Grand Guerilla	February 25, 2024	3.0%
1096	8	"A Forbidden Piece of History! A Theory Concerning a Kingdom"; Transliteration: "Kinji Rareta Rekishi! Aru Ōkoku no Kasetsu" (Japanese: 禁じられた歴史！ある王国の仮説)	Tasuku Shimaya	Jin Tanaka	Masahiro Shimanuki	March 3, 2024	3.2%
1097	9	"The Will of Ohara! The Inherited Research"; Transliteration: "Ohara no Ishi! Uketsugareru Kenkyū" (Japanese: オハラの意志！受け継がれる研究)	Hazuki Omoya	Tomohiro Nakayama	Kenji Yokoyama	March 17, 2024	3.1%
1098	10	"The Eccentric Dream of a Genius!"; Transliteration: "Kisō Tengai! Tensai ga Omoiegaku Yume!" (Japanese: 奇想天外！天才が想い描く夢！)	Toshinori Fukuzawa	Shōji Yonemura	Shūichi Itō	March 24, 2024	3.1%
1099	11	"Preparations for Interception! Rob Lucci Strikes!"; Transliteration: "Geigeki Junbi! Robu Rutchi Shūrai!" (Japanese: 迎撃準備！ロブ・ルッチ襲来！)	Directed by : Kenichi Takeshita; Storyboarded by : Kenichi Takeshita & Yutaka Nakashima	Ryo Yamazaki	Masayuki Takagi	March 31, 2024	2.9%
1100	12	"Powers on a Different Level! Luffy vs. Lucci!"; Transliteration: "I Jigen no Chikara! Rufi tai Rutchi!" (Japanese: 異次元の力！ルフィVS(たい)ルッチ！)	Nozomu Shishido	Atsuhiro Tomioka	Keita Saitō, Kimitaka Itō & Hiroyasu Oda	April 7, 2024	3.0%
1101	13	"The Strongest Form of Humanity! The Seraphim's Powers!"; Transliteration: "Saikyō no Jinrui! Serafimu no Nōryoku!" (Japanese: 最強の人類！セラフィムの能力！)	Wataru Matsumi	Akiko Inoue	Yong-Ce Tu & Ziwei He	April 21, 2024	N/A
1102	14	"Sinister Schemes! The Operation to Escape Egghead"; Transliteration: "Ugomeku Inbō! Egguheddo Dasshutsu Sakusen" (Japanese: 蠢く陰謀！エッグヘッド脱出作戦)	Yusuke Suzuki	Shinzō Fujita	Shigefumi Shingaki	April 28, 2024	2.6%
1103	15	"Turn Back My Father! Bonney's Futile Wish!"; Transliteration: "Chichi o Modose! Hakanaki Bonī no Negai!" (Japanese: 父を戻せ！儚きボニーの願い！)	Katsumi Tokoro	Jin Tanaka	Kazuya Hisada	May 5, 2024	2.6%
1104	16	"A Desperate Situation! The Seraphim's All-out Attack!"; Transliteration: "Zettai Zetsumei! Serafimu Sō Kōgeki!" (Japanese: 絶体絶命！セラフィム総攻撃！)	Directed by : Shō Matsui; Storyboarded by : Shō Matsui, Yasunori Koyama & Shō Inuzuka	Tomohiro Nakayama	Masahiro Kitazaki	May 12, 2024	2.7%
1105	17	"A Beautiful Act of Treason! The Spy, Stussy!"; Transliteration: "Uruwashiki Hangyaku! Naitsū-sha Sutyūshī" (Japanese: 麗しき反逆！内通者ステューシー)	Hazuki Omoya	Shōji Yonemura	Toshio Deguchi, RA Craft & Grand Guerilla	May 19, 2024	2.9%
1106	18	"Trouble Occurs! Seek Dr. Vegapunk!"; Transliteration: "Ijō Hassei! Sagase! Dokutā Begapanku" (Japanese: 異常発生！探せ！Dr.(ドクター)ベガパンク)	Directed by : Eri Hyun; Storyboarded by : Yasunori Koyama & Eri Hyun	Ryo Yamazaki	Eisaku Inoue	May 26, 2024	2.8%
1107	19	"A Shudder! The Evil Hand Creeping Up on the Laboratory"; Transliteration: "Senritsu! Kenkyūjo e Shinobiyoru Ma no Te" (Japanese: 戦慄！研究所へ忍び寄る魔の手)	Tasuku Shimaya	Akiko Inoue	Kenji Yokoyama	June 2, 2024	2.7%
1108	20	"Incomprehensible! The Seraphim's Rebellion!"; Transliteration: "Rikai Funō! Serafimu no Hangyaku!" (Japanese: 理解不能！セラフィムの反逆！)	Directed by : Atsuo Yamai; Storyboarded by : Tatsuya Nagamine	Shinzō Fujita	Masahiro Shimanuki	June 9, 2024	2.8%
1109	21	"A Tough Decision! An Unusual United Front!"; Transliteration: "Kujū no Ketsudan! Ishoku no Kyōtō Sensen!" (Japanese: 苦渋の決断！異色の共闘戦線！)	Directed by : Nanami Michibata; Storyboarded by : Masahiro Hosoda & Nanami Michibata	Jin Tanaka	Masayuki Takagi	June 23, 2024	3.5%
1110	22	"Survive! Deadly Combat with the Strongest Form of Humanity!"; Transliteration: "Ikinokore! Saikyō no Jinrui to no Shitō" (Japanese: 生き残れ！最強の人類との死闘)	Katsumi Tokoro	Tomohiro Nakayama	Shūichi Itō & Nobuyuki Iwai	June 30, 2024	2.7%
1111	23	"The Second Ohara! The Mastermind's Ambition!"; Transliteration: "Ohara no Sairai! Kuromaku no Yabō!" (Japanese: オハラの再来！黒幕の野望！)	Toshinori Fukuzawa	Shōji Yonemura	Keita Saitō, Kimitaka Itō & Keisuke Mori	July 7, 2024	2.9%
1112	24	"Clash! Shanks vs. Eustass Kid"; Transliteration: "Gekitotsu! Shankusu tai Yūsutasu Kiddo" (Japanese: 激突！シャンクスVS(たい)ユースタス・キッド)	Wataru Matsumi	Ryo Yamazaki	Yong-Ce Tu & Ziwei He	July 14, 2024	3.1%
1113	25	"Run, Koby! A Desperate Escape Strategy!"; Transliteration: "Hashire Kobī! Kesshi no Dasshutsu Sakusen!" (Japanese: 走れコビー！決死の脱出作戦！)	Yusuke Suzuki	Atsuhiro Tomioka	Shigefumi Shingaki & Toshio Deguchi	July 28, 2024	2.7%
1114	26	"For the Beloved Pupil - The Fist of Vice Admiral Garp!"; Transliteration: "Manadeshi no Tame - Gāpu Chūjō no Genkotsu!" (Japanese: 愛弟子のため ガープ中将の拳骨！)	Hazuki Omoya	Akiko Inoue	Kazuya Hisada & Hone Hone	August 4, 2024	2.7%
1115	27	"The Navy Surprised! The Navy Headquarters' Former Admiral, Kuzan"; Transliteration: "Kaigun Kyōgaku! Moto Kaigun Honbu Taishō Kuzan" (Japanese: 海軍驚愕！元海軍本部大将クザン)	Nozomu Shishido	Shinzō Fujita	Masahiro Kitazaki, Hiroyasu Oda, Hone Hone, RA Craft & Grand Guerrilla	August 11, 2024	2.7%
1116	28	"Let's Go Get It! Buggy's Big Declaration"; Transliteration: "Tori ni Ikō ze! Bagī no Dai Sengen" (Japanese: 取りに行こうぜ！バギーの大宣言)	Directed by : Eri Hyun; Storyboarded by : Satoshi Itō & Eri Hyun	Jin Tanaka	Eisaku Inoue	August 18, 2024	2.9%
1117	29	"Sabo Returns - The Shocking Truth to Be Told!"; Transliteration: "Sabo no Kikan - Katarareru Shōgeki no Shinjitsu!" (Japanese: サボの帰還 語られる衝撃の真実！)	Directed by : Tasuku Shimaya; Storyboarded by : Hazuki Omoya & Tasuku Shimaya	Tomohiro Nakayama	Kenji Yokoyama	September 1, 2024	2.8%
1118	30	"The Holy Land in Tumult! Sai and Leo's Full-Power Blow!"; Transliteration: "Seichi Sōzen! Sai to Reo Konshin no Ichigeki!" (Japanese: 聖地騒然！サイとレオ渾身の一撃！)	Kenichi Takeshita	Shōji Yonemura	Masayuki Takagi	September 8, 2024	2.5%
1119	31	"The Entrusted Message! King Cobra's Resolve"; Transliteration: "Takusareta Messēji! Kobura-Ō no Kakugo" (Japanese: 託された伝言(メッセージ)！コブラ王の覚悟)	Yasuhiro Tanabe	Atsuhiro Tomioka	Ziwei He & Masahiro Shimanuki	September 15, 2024	2.5%
1120	32	"The World Is Shaken! The Ruler's Judgment and the Five Elders' Actions!"; Transliteration: "Yuragu Sekai! Shihai-sha no Shinpan to Gorōsei no Shidō!" (Japanese: 揺らぐ世界！支配者の審判と五老星の始動！)	Katsumi Tokoro	Atsuhiro Tomioka	Shūichi Itō & Toshio Deguchi	September 22, 2024	2.8%
1121	33	"Garp and Kuzan - A Master and a Pupil's Beliefs Clash"; Transliteration: "Gāpu to Kuzan - Shōtotsu Suru Shitei no Seigi" (Japanese: ガープとクザン 衝突する師弟の正義)	Directed by : Shō Matsui; Storyboarded by : Toshinori Fukuzawa & Shō Matsui	Akiko Inoue	Masahiro Kitazaki & Yong-Ce Tu	October 6, 2024	2.5%
1122	34	"The Last Lesson! Impact Inherited"; Transliteration: "Saigo no Oshie! Uketsugareta Inpakuto" (Japanese: 最後の教え！受け継がれた拳骨(インパクト))	Yasunori Koyama	Shinzō Fujita	Kazuya Hisada, Keita Saitō, Katsumi Ishizuka, Hiroyasu Oda & Chiharu Akakura	October 13, 2024	2.5%
1123	35	"The World Shakes! The Straw Hats' Hostage Situation"; Transliteration: "Sekai Shinkan! Mugiwara no Ichimi Tatekomori Jiken" (Japanese: 世界震撼！麦わらの一味立てこもり事件)	Satoshi Itō	Shōji Yonemura	Kenji Yokoyama	April 5, 2025	3.9%
1124	36	"Completely Surrounded! The Operation to Escape Egghead"; Transliteration: "Zenmen Hōi! Egguheddo Dasshutsu Sakusen" (Japanese: 全面包囲！エッグヘッド脱出作戦)	Aimi Yamauchi	Jin Tanaka	Eisaku Inoue	April 6, 2025	3.7%
1125	37	"A Clash of Two Men's Determination! Kizaru and Sentomaru"; Transliteration: "Butsukaru Otoko no Kakugo! Kizaru to Sentomaru" (Japanese: ぶつかる男の覚悟！黄猿と戦桃丸)	Yasushi Tomoda	Tomohiro Nakayama	Masayuki Takagi & Katsumi Ishizuka	April 13, 2025	3.1%
1126	38	"Looming Despair! Admiral Kizaru's Depressing Mission"; Transliteration: "Semaru Zetsubō! Taishō Kizaru no Yūutsuna Ninmu" (Japanese: 迫る絶望！大将黄猿の憂鬱な任務)	Hazuki Omoya	Atsuhiro Tomioka	Toshio Deguchi & Masahiro Kitazaki	April 20, 2025	2.8%
1127	39	"Luffy vs. Kizaru! A Fierce Kaleidoscopic Battle"; Transliteration: "Rufi bāsasu Kizaru! Hengen Jizai no Dai Gekisen" (Japanese: ルフィVS(バーサス)黄猿！変幻自在の大激戦)	Wataru Matsumi	Akiko Inoue	Yong-Ce Tu & Ziwei He	April 27, 2025	2.9%
1128	40	"The Nightmare Strikes - Godhead of Science & Defense, St. Saturn"; Transliteration: "Akumu Shūrai - Kagaku Bōei Bushin Satān-sei" (Japanese: 悪夢襲来 科学防衛武神サターン聖)	Nozomu Shishido	Shinzō Fujita	Shin Kashiwaguma	May 4, 2025	3.2%
1129	41	"Kuma's Past - Better Off Dead in This World"; Transliteration: "Kuma no Kako - Shinda Hō ga ī Sekai" (Japanese: くまの過去 死んだ方がいい世界)	Tasuku Shimaya	Shōji Yonemura	Keita Saitō, Kimitaka Itō, Rina Fujii, Ririka Fukatani, Katsumi Ishizuka & Neru Takuyama	May 18, 2025	2.9%
1130	42	"A History Erased! God Valley of Despair"; Transliteration: "Kesa-reta Rekishi! Zetsubō no Goddo Barē" (Japanese: 消された歴史！絶望のゴッドバレー)	Eri Hyun	Jin Tanaka	Kazuya Hisada	May 25, 2025	2.7%
1131	43	"A Fleeting Moment of Happiness - Kumachi and Ginny"; Transliteration: "Hitotoki no Shiawase - Kumachī to Jinī" (Japanese: ひとときの幸せ くまちーとジニー)	Katsumi Tokoro	Tomohiro Nakayama	Masahiro Kitazaki	June 1, 2025	2.9%
1132	44	"A Pledge to Ginny - Kuma Becomes a Father"; Transliteration: "Jinī e no Chikai - Chichi to Natta Kuma" (Japanese: ジニーへの誓い 父となったくま)	Shō Inuzuka	Ryo Yamazaki	Shigefumi Shingaki & Shūichi Itō	June 8, 2025	N/A
1133	45	"To Save His Daughter - Kuma the Timid Pacifist"; Transliteration: "Bonī o Sukue - Kiyowana "Pashifisuta" Kuma" (Japanese: 娘(ボニー)を救え 気弱な〝平和主義者(パシフィスタ)〟くま)	Toshinori Fukuzawa	Atsuhiro Tomioka	Eisaku Inoue	June 15, 2025	2.7%
1134	46	"Cruel Fate - Kuma's Decision as a Father"; Transliteration: "Hijō-naru Unmei - Chichi Kuma no Ketsudan" (Japanese: 非情なる運命 父くまの決断)	Hazuki Omoya	Akiko Inoue	Masayuki Takagi & Toshio Deguchi	June 29, 2025	2.8%
1135	47	"To the Sea Where My Father Is! The Future Bonney Chooses"; Transliteration: "Chichi no Iru Umi e! Bonī ga Erabu Mirai" (Japanese: 父のいる海へ！ボニーが選ぶ未来)	Directed by : Shō Matsui & Wataru Matsumi; Storyboarded by : Shō Matsui	Shinzō Fujita	Kenji Yokoyama	July 6, 2025	3.7%
1136	48	"Kuma's Life"; Transliteration: "Kuma no Jinsei" (Japanese: くまの人生)	Yasunori Koyama	Shōji Yonemura	Hiroto Saitō, Kimitaka Itō & Masayuki Satō	July 13, 2025	2.7%
1137	49	"I'm Sorry, Dad - Bonney's Tears and Kuma's Fist"; Transliteration: "Gomen ne, Otōsan - Bonī no Namida to Kuma no Koboshi" (Japanese: ごめんね、お父さん ボニーの涙とくまの拳)	Wataru Matsumi	Jin Tanaka	Yong-Ce Tu & Ziwei He	July 27, 2025	2.7%
1138	50	"Thank You, Dad - Bonney and Kuma's Warm Embrace"; Transliteration: "Arigatō, Otōsan - Bonī to Kuma no Atsuki Hōyō" (Japanese: ありがとう、お父さん ボニーとくまの熱き抱擁)	Directed by : Tomohiro Higashi; Storyboarded by : Katsumi Tokoro	Tomohiro Nakayama	Masahiro Kitazaki	August 3, 2025	2.6%
1139	51	"Destroy Egghead - The Buster Call Is Invoked"; Transliteration: "Egguheddo o Hakai Seyo - Basutā Kōru Hatsudō" (Japanese: 未来島(エッグヘッド)を破壊せよ バスターコール発動)	Yusuke Suzuki	Ryo Yamazaki	Kazuya Hisada	August 10, 2025	2.6%
1140	52	"An Admired Hero - The Warrior of Liberation Who Saves Bonney"; Transliteration: "Akogare no Hīrō - Bonī o Sukuu Kaihō no Senshi" (Japanese: 憧れのヒーロー ボニーを救う解放の戦士)	Yasuhiro Tanabe	Atsuhiro Tomioka	Nobuyuki Iwai & Keita Saitō	August 17, 2025	2.3%
1141	53	"Reliable Reinforcements! Dorry and Brogy Arrive!"; Transliteration: "Tanomoshiki Engun! Dorī to Burogī Tōchaku!" (Japanese: 頼もしき援軍！ドリーとブロギー到着！)	Eri Hyun	Akiko Inoue	Shigefumi Shingaki, Shūichi Itō & Zhi Guang Liu	August 24, 2025	2.7%
1142	54	"Come In, World - Vegapunk's Message"; Transliteration: "Ōtō Seyo, Sekai - Begapanku no Messēji" (Japanese: 応答せよ、世界 ベガパンクのメッセージ)	Directed by : Atsuo Yamai; Storyboarded by : Miho Hirayama	Shinzō Fujita	Eisaku Inoue	September 7, 2025	2.8%
1143	55	"Vegapunk's Secret Plan - A Tense Worldwide Broadcast"; Transliteration: "Begapanku no Hisaku - Kinpaku no Zen Sekai Haishin" (Japanese: ベガパンクの秘策 緊迫の全世界配信)	Hazuki Omoya	Shōji Yonemura	Toshio Deguchi & Yuki Yoshida	September 14, 2025	2.3%
1144	56	"The Worst Nightmare - The Five Elders Come Together"; Transliteration: "Saikyō no Akumu - "Gorōsei" Shūketsu" (Japanese: 最凶の悪夢 ｢五老星｣集結)	Toshinori Fukuzawa	Jin Tanaka	Shin Kashiwaguma, Katsumi Ishizuka & Yong-Ce Tu	September 21, 2025	2.6%
1145	57	"Friends Fight Together! Luffy and the Warriors of Elbaph"; Transliteration: "Dachi to no Kyōtō! Rufi to Erubafu no Senshi" (Japanese: 友達(ダチ)との共闘！ルフィとエルバフの戦士)	Kenichi Takeshita	Tomohiro Nakayama	Masayuki Takagi	September 28, 2025	2.6%
1146	58	"An Imminent Threat - Stussy and Edison's Resolve"; Transliteration: "Osoi-kuru Kyōi - Sutyūshī to "Ejison" no Ketsui" (Japanese: 襲い来る脅威 ステューシーと｢想(エジソン)｣の決意)	Shō Inuzuka	Ryo Yamazaki	Kenji Yokoyama	October 19, 2025	2.8%
1147	59	"A Stunning Conclusion - Vegapunk's Great Prediction"; Transliteration: "Kyōgaku no Ketsuron - Begapanku no Dai Yogen" (Japanese: 驚愕の結論 ベガパンクの大予言)	Katsumi Tokoro	Atsuhiro Tomioka	Masahiro Kitazaki	October 26, 2025	3.1%
1148	60	"The Lost History - Joy Boy, the First Pirate"; Transliteration: "Maboroshi no Rekishi - Hajimari no Kaizoku Joi Bōi" (Japanese: 幻の歴史 はじまりの海賊ジョイボーイ)	Yusuke Suzuki	Akiko Inoue	Kazuya Hisada	November 2, 2025	2.8%
1149	61	"The Void Century - A Revelation About a Sinking World"; Transliteration: "Kūhaku no Hyaku-nen - Sekai Chinbotsu no Shinjitsu" (Japanese: 空白の100(ひゃく)年 世界沈没の真実)	Shō Matsui	Shinzō Fujita	Hiroto Saitō & Yuki Yoshida	November 9, 2025	3.4%
1150	62	"Get the Ship Moving! The Iron Giant Activates"; Transliteration: "Fune o Dase! "Tetsu no Kyojin" Shidō" (Japanese: 船を出せ！〝鉄の巨人〟始動)	Directed by : Tomohiro Higashi; Storyboarded by : Miho Hirayama	Shōji Yonemura	Eisaku Inoue, Keita Saitō & Kimitaka Itō	November 16, 2025	2.8%
1151	63	"Her and Her Father's Dream! Bonney's Free Future"; Transliteration: "Chichi to Egaita Yume! Bonī no Jiyūna Mirai" (Japanese: 父と描いた夢！ボニーの自由な未来)	Directed by : Eri Hyun; Storyboarded by : Aya Komaki & Eri Hyun	Jin Tanaka	Masahiro Shimanuki & Zhi Guang Liu	November 30, 2025	2.8%
1152	64	"Her Father and Mother's Legacy! Bonney's Nika Punch"; Transliteration: "Chichi to Haha no Omoi! Bonī no Nika Panchi" (Japanese: 父と母の想い！ボニーの解放の拳(ニカパンチ))	Nozomu Shishido	Tomohiro Nakayama	Yong-Ce Tu & Ziwei He	December 7, 2025	2.8%
1153	65	"The Upheaval of an Era! The Color of the Supreme King That Leads Luffy"; Transliteration: "Jidai no Uneri! Rufi o Michibiku Haōshoku" (Japanese: 時代のうねり！ルフィを導く覇王色)	Hazuki Omoya	Ryo Yamazaki	Toshio Deguchi & Runze Wang	December 14, 2025	2.8%
1154	66	"The Truth Behind the Secret Plan - Vegapunk Claims Victory"; Transliteration: "Hisaku no Shinsō - Begapanku no Shōri Sengen" (Japanese: 秘策の真相 ベガパンクの勝利宣言)	Satoshi Itō	Atsuhiro Tomioka	Masahiro Kitazaki & Shigefumi Shingaki	December 21, 2025	2.4%
1155	67	"The Promised Horizon - Off to the Long-Awaited Elbaph!"; Transliteration: "Yakusoku no Suiheisen - Iza Nengan no Erubafu e!" (Japanese: 約束の水平線 いざ念願のエルバフへ！)	Directed by : Atsuo Yamai & Yasunori Koyama; Storyboarded by : Yasunori Koyama	Akiko Inoue	Shūichi Itō	December 28, 2025	2.6%

=== Season 22: Elbaph (2026–) ===
No. overall	No. in season	Title	Directed by	Written by	Original release date	Viewership rating
1156	1	"The Long-sought Elbaph! The Big Reunion Banquet"; Transliteration: "Akogare no Erubafu! Saikai no Dekkē Utage" (Japanese: 憧れのエルバフ！再会のでっけェ宴)	Wataru Matsumi	Shōji Yonemura	April 5, 2026	2.5%
1157	2	"Nami in a Fix! An Adventure in Block Kingdom"; Transliteration: "Nami Konwaku! Burokku no Kuni no Bōken" (Japanese: ナミ困惑！ブロックの国の冒険)	Yasuhiro Tanabe	Tomohiro Nakayama	April 12, 2026	2.8%
1158	3	"A Quest in the Land of Mystery! The Secret of the Sun God"; Transliteration: "Nazo no Kuni no Kuesuto! Taiyō-shin no Himitsu" (Japanese: 謎の国の探索(クエスト)！太陽神の秘密)	Masanori Satō	Akiko Inoue	April 19, 2026	2.8%
1159	4	"Destroy the Miniature Garden - Escape Block Kingdom!"; Transliteration: "Hakoniwa o Bukkowase - Dasshutsu! Burokku no Kuni" (Japanese: 箱庭をブッ壊せ 脱出！ブロックの国)	Directed by : Nanami Michibata; Storyboarded by : Katsumi Tokoro, Nanami Michibata & Katsumi Ishizuka	Shinzō Fujita	April 26, 2026	2.6%
1160	5	"An Encounter on a Snowfield - Loki, the Accursed Prince"; Transliteration: "Setsugen no Kaigō - Noroi no Ōji Roki" (Japanese: 雪原の邂逅 呪いの王子ロキ)	Directed by : Shō Matsui; Storyboarded by : Wataru Matsumi & Shō Matsui	Jin Tanaka	May 3, 2026	2.2%
1161	6	"A Dangerous Deal! Loki of the Underworld and Luffy"; Transliteration: "Kiken'na Torihiki! Meikai no Roki to Rufi" (Japanese: 危険な取引！冥界のロキとルフィ)	Directed by : Shūhei Iwasawa; Storyboarded by : Toshinori Fukuzawa, Hazuki Omoya & Shūhei Iwasawa	Atsuhiro Tomioka	May 10, 2026	2.4%
1162	7	"A Gargantuan Wave of Emotion - The Dreamlike Scenery of Elbaph"; Transliteration: "Kyodaina Kandō - Yume no Zekkei Erubafu" (Japanese: 巨大な感動 夢の絶景エルバフ)	Katsumi Tokoro	Shōji Yonemura	May 17, 2026	2.5%
1163	8	"I Want You to Praise Me - The Reunion of Robin and Saul"; Transliteration: "Homete Hoshī - Robin to Sauro no Saikai" (Japanese: 褒めてほしい ロビンとサウロの再会)	Yasunori Koyama	Tomohiro Nakayama	May 24, 2026	2.7%
1164	9	"Saul's Resolve - The Inherited Will of Ohara"; Transliteration: "Sauro no Omoi - Uketsuga-reta Ohara no Ishi" (Japanese: サウロの想い 受け継がれたオハラの意志)	Yusuke Suzuki	Tomohiro Nakayama	May 31, 2026	2.5%
1165	10	"A Welcome with Friends' Cups and Intruders Seeking Loki"; Transliteration: "Kangei no "Tomo no Sakazuki" to Roki o Sagasu Shin'nyū-sha" (Japanese: 歓迎の〝友の盃〟とロキを探す侵入者)	Eri Hyun	Shinzō Fujita	June 7, 2026	2.8%
1166	11	"Encountering Loki - Gunko of the Knights of God"; Transliteration: "Roki to no Sōgū - Kami no Kishidan: Gunko" (Japanese: ロキとの遭遇 神の騎士団 軍子)	Tomohiro Higashi	Jin Tanaka	June 14, 2026	2.2%
1167	12	"Shamrock Appears - Commander of the Knights of God"; Transliteration: "Kami no Kishidan: Danchō - Shamurokku Tōjō" (Japanese: 神の騎士団 団長 シャムロック登場)	Shō Inuzuka	Tomohiro Nakayama	June 21, 2026	N/A
1168	13	"Ancient History - The Harley Passed Down by Elbaph"; Transliteration: "Taiko no Rekishi - Erubafu ga Kataritsugu "Hārei"" (Japanese: 太古の歴史 エルバフが語り継ぐ〝神典〟(ハーレイ))	Wataru Matsumi	Tomohiro Nakayama	June 28, 2026	N/A
1169	14	"The Legend Lurking in Elbaph - The Identity of the Mountain-Eater"; Transliteration: "Erubafu ni Hisomu Densetsu - "Yamagurai" no Shōtai" (Japanese: エルバフに潜む伝説 〝山喰らい〟の正体)	Kenichi Takeshita	Shinzō Fujita	July 12, 2026	N/A
1170	15	"Get the Key! Luffy vs. Scopper Gaban"; Transliteration: "Kagi o Ubae! Rufi tai Sukoppā Gyaban" (Japanese: 鍵を奪え！ルフィVS(たい)スコッパー・ギャバン)	Directed by : Kyōsuke Yamazaki; Storyboarded by : Yong-Ce Tu, Toshinori Fukuzawa & Kyōsuke Yamazaki	Jin Tanaka	July 19, 2026	2.3%
1171	16	"The Heinous Sinner - Loki of the Underworld Freed?!"; Transliteration: "Erubafu no Taizai-nin - Meikai no Roki Kaihō!?" (Japanese: エルバフの大罪人 冥界のロキ解放!?)	Katsumi Tokoro	Tomohiro Nakayama	July 26, 2026	N/A
1172	17	"Monsters Appear in Elbaph - 'What I Fear Most'"; Transliteration: "Kaibutsu Shutsugen - Erubafu o Osou "Kowai Mono"" (Japanese: 怪物出現 エルバフを襲う〝こわいもの〟)	Directed by : Nanami Michibata; Storyboarded by : Toshinori Fukuzawa, Katsumi Ishizuka & Miho Hirayama	Shinzō Fujita	August 2, 2026	2.0%
1173	18	"A Nightmarish Game - The Dark Plot of the Knights of God"; Transliteration: "Akumu no Gēmu - Kami no Kishidan no Inbō" (Japanese: 悪夢のゲーム 神の騎士団の陰謀)	Yūna Hirosue	Jin Tanaka	August 9, 2026	2.8%
1174	19	"Save the Children! The Elbaph Warriors Rise Up"; Transliteration: "Kodomo-tachi o Sukue! Erubafu no Senshi Shutsugeki" (Japanese: 子供達を救え！エルバフの戦士出撃)	Directed by : Kan Murakami; Storyboarded by : Kan Murakami & Miho Hirayama	Tomohiro Nakayama	August 16, 2026	2.7%
1175	20	"Elbaph in Flames! Jinbe's Shoulder Throw Explodes!"; Transliteration: "Erubafu Enjō - Sakuretsu! Jinbē no Ipponzeoi" (Japanese: エルバフ炎上 炸裂！ジンベエの一本背負い)	Eri Hyun	Shinzō Fujita	August 23, 2026	2.3%
1176	21	"The Threat of the Arrow-Arrow Fruit - Gunko vs. the Straw Hats"; Transliteration: "Aro-Aro no Mi no Kyōi - Gunko tai Mugiwara no Ichimi" (Japanese: アロアロの実の脅威 軍子VS(たい)麦わらの一味)	Directed by : Shūhei Iwasawa; Storyboarded by : Shūhei Iwasawa, Anikari, Hinata Narumi & Miho Hirayama	Tomohiro Nakayama	August 30, 2026	N/A
1177	22	"A Despicable Hostage Game - Sommers's Brazen Demands"; Transliteration: "Hiretsuna Hitojichi Gēmu - Somāzu no Futekina Kyōhaku" (Japanese: 卑劣な人質ゲーム ソマーズの不敵な脅迫)	Yusuke Suzuki	Tomohiro Nakayama	September 6, 2026	2.4%
1178	23	"Protect History and the Future - Robin and Gaban Go on the Attack"; Transliteration: "Rekishi to Mirai o Mamore - Robin to Gyaban Shutsugeki" (Japanese: 歴史と未来を守れ ロビンとギャバン出撃)	Directed by : Shō Matsui; Storyboarded by : Toshinori Fukuzawa & Shō Matsui	Shinzō Fujita	September 13, 2026	N/A
1179	24	"One Do-or-Die Second - Gaban vs. the Knights of God"; Transliteration: "Kesshi no Ichi-byō - Gyaban tai Kami no Kishidan" (Japanese: 決死の一秒 ギャバンVS(たい)神の騎士団)	Shō Inuzuka	Jin Tanaka	September 20, 2026	TBD
1180	25	"Elbaph in Despair - Diabolical Covenant, 'Domi Reversi'"; Transliteration: "Zetsubō no Erubafu - Akuma no Keiyaku "Domi Ribāshi"" (Japanese: 絶望のエルバフ 悪魔の契約〝黒転支配〟(ドミ・リバーシ))	TBA	TBA	September 27, 2026	TBD

== Home media releases ==
=== Japanese ===
Season 16 onward, including the Film Z and Film Gold tie-in episodes, were released on both DVD and Blu-ray. The Log Collections were released on DVD only.

Avex Pictures (Japan – Region 2/A)
Volume		Episodes	Release date	Ref.
20THシーズン ワノ国編	piece.1	892–894, 897	January 8, 2020	
20THシーズン ワノ国編	piece.2	898–901	February 5, 2020	
20THシーズン ワノ国編	piece.3	902–905	March 4, 2020	
20THシーズン ワノ国編	piece.4	906, 908–910	April 1, 2020	
20THシーズン ワノ国編	piece.5	911–914	May 8, 2020	
20THシーズン ワノ国編	piece.6	915–918	June 3, 2020	
20THシーズン ワノ国編	piece.7	919–922	July 1, 2020	
20THシーズン ワノ国編	piece.8	923–926	August 5, 2020	
20THシーズン ワノ国編	piece.9	927–930	September 2, 2020	
20THシーズン ワノ国編	piece.10	931–934	October 7, 2020	
20THシーズン ワノ国編	piece.11	935–938	November 4, 2020	
20THシーズン ワノ国編	piece.12	939–942	December 2, 2020	
20THシーズン ワノ国編	piece.13	943–946	January 6, 2021	
20THシーズン ワノ国編	piece.14	947–950	February 3, 2021	
20THシーズン ワノ国編	piece.15	951–954	March 3, 2021	
20THシーズン ワノ国編	piece.16	955–958	April 7, 2021	
20THシーズン ワノ国編	piece.17	959–962	May 7, 2021	
20THシーズン ワノ国編	piece.18	963–966	June 2, 2021	
20THシーズン ワノ国編	piece.19	967–970	July 7, 2021	
20THシーズン ワノ国編	piece.20	971–974	August 4, 2021	
20THシーズン ワノ国編	piece.21	975–978	September 1, 2021	
20THシーズン ワノ国編	piece.22	979–982	October 6, 2021	
20THシーズン ワノ国編	piece.23	983–986	November 3, 2021	
20THシーズン ワノ国編	piece.24	987–990	December 1, 2021	
20THシーズン ワノ国編	piece.25	991–994	January 5, 2022	
20THシーズン ワノ国編	piece.26	995–998	February 2, 2022	
20THシーズン ワノ国編	piece.27	999–1002	March 2, 2022	
20THシーズン ワノ国編	piece.28	1003–1005, SP–1	April 6, 2022	
20THシーズン ワノ国編	piece.29	1006–1009	May 4, 2022	
20THシーズン ワノ国編	piece.30	1010–1013	June 8, 2022	
20THシーズン ワノ国編	piece.31	1014–1016, SP–2	July 6, 2022	
20THシーズン ワノ国編	piece.32	1017–1020	August 3, 2022	
20THシーズン ワノ国編	piece.33	1021–1023, SP–3	September 7, 2022	
20THシーズン ワノ国編	piece.34	1024–1027	October 5, 2022	
20THシーズン ワノ国編	piece.35	1028, 1031–1032	November 2, 2022	
20THシーズン ワノ国編	piece.36	1033–1035	December 7, 2022	
20THシーズン ワノ国編	piece.37	1036–1037, SP–5	January 11, 2023	
20THシーズン ワノ国編	piece.38	1038–1040	February 1, 2023	
20THシーズン ワノ国編	piece.39	1041–1043	March 1, 2023	
20THシーズン ワノ国編	piece.40	1044–1045, SP–6	April 5, 2023	
20THシーズン ワノ国編	piece.41	1046–1048	May 10, 2023	
20THシーズン ワノ国編	piece.42	1049–1051	June 7, 2023	
20THシーズン ワノ国編	piece.43	1052–1054	July 5, 2023	
20THシーズン ワノ国編	piece.44	1055–1057	August 2, 2023	
20THシーズン ワノ国編	piece.45	1058–1060	September 6, 2023	
20THシーズン ワノ国編	piece.46	1061–1062, SP–7	October 4, 2023	
20THシーズン ワノ国編	piece.47	1067–1067, SP–8	November 1, 2023	
20THシーズン ワノ国編	piece.48	1063–1065	December 6, 2023	
20THシーズン ワノ国編	piece.49	1068–1070	January 10, 2024	
20THシーズン ワノ国編	piece.50	1071–1073	February 7, 2024	
20THシーズン ワノ国編	piece.51	1074–1075, SP–9	March 6, 2024	
20THシーズン ワノ国編	piece.52	1076–1078	April 3, 2024	
20THシーズン ワノ国編	piece.53	SP–10, 1079–1081	May 8, 2024	
20THシーズン ワノ国編	piece.54	1082–1085	June 5, 2024	
20THシーズン ワノ国編	piece.55	1086–1088, SP–11	July 3, 2024	
21STシーズン ワノ国編	piece.1	1089–1091	August 7, 2024	
21STシーズン ワノ国編	piece.2	1092–1093 + SP–1	September 4, 2024	
21STシーズン ワノ国編	piece.3	1094–1096	October 2, 2024	
21STシーズン ワノ国編	piece.4	1097–1099	November 6, 2024	
21STシーズン ワノ国編	piece.5	1100–1101 + SP–2	December 4, 2024	
21STシーズン ワノ国編	piece.6	1102–1104	January 8, 2025	
21STシーズン ワノ国編	piece.7	1105–1107	February 5, 2025	
21STシーズン ワノ国編	piece.8	1108–1109 + SP–3	March 5, 2025	
21STシーズン ワノ国編	piece.9	1110–1112	April 2, 2025	
21STシーズン ワノ国編	piece.10	1113–1115	May 7, 2025	
21STシーズン ワノ国編	piece.11	1116–1117 + SP–4	June 4, 2025	
21STシーズン ワノ国編	piece.12	1118–1120	July 2, 2025	
21STシーズン ワノ国編	piece.13	1121–1122 + SP–5	August 6, 2025	
21STシーズン ワノ国編	piece.14	1123–1125	September 3, 2025	
21STシーズン ワノ国編	piece.15	1126–1128	October 1, 2025	
21STシーズン ワノ国編	piece.16	1129–1130 + SP–8	November 3, 2025	
21STシーズン ワノ国編	piece.17	1131–1133	December 3, 2025	
21STシーズン ワノ国編	piece.18	1134–1135 + SP–9	January 7, 2026	
21STシーズン ワノ国編	piece.19	1136–1138	February 4, 2026	
21STシーズン ワノ国編	piece.20	1139–1141	March 4, 2026	
21STシーズン ワノ国編	piece.21	1142–1143 + SP–10	April 1, 2026	
21STシーズン ワノ国編	piece.22	1144–1145 + SP–11	May 13, 2026	
21STシーズン ワノ国編	piece.23	1146–1148	June 3, 2026	
21STシーズン ワノ国編	piece.24	1149–1150 + SP–12	July 1, 2026	
21STシーズン ワノ国編	piece.25	1151–1153	August 5, 2026	
21STシーズン ワノ国編	piece.26	1154–1155	September 2, 2026	
ROMANCE DAWN		1, 907	January 24, 2020	
映画連動特別編「ONE PIECE STAMPEDE 前日譚」		895–896	February 28, 2020	
ONE PIECE Log Collection	"WANOKUNI"	892–894, 897–905	June 24, 2022	
ONE PIECE Log Collection	"KIN'EMON"	906, 908–917	July 29, 2022	
ONE PIECE Log Collection	"HANANOMIYAKO"	918–929	August 26, 2022	
ONE PIECE Log Collection	"UDON"	930–943	September 30, 2022	
ONE PIECE Log Collection	"HIYORI"	944–956	October 28, 2022	
ONE PIECE Log Collection	"KURI"	957–965	June 30, 2023	
ONE PIECE Log Collection	"ODEN"	966–976	July 28, 2023	
ONE PIECE Log Collection	"JINBE"	977–989	August 25, 2023	
ONE PIECE Log Collection	"YAMATO"	990–1004	September 29, 2023	
ONE PIECE Log Collection	"KORIONI"	1005–1018	June 26, 2024	
ONE PIECE Log Collection	"KAIDOU"	1019–1033	July 31, 2024	
ONE PIECE Log Collection	"DEMON"	1034–1045	August 28, 2024	
ONE PIECE Log Collection	"QUEEN"	1046–1055	June 25, 2025	
ONE PIECE Log Collection	"KING"	1056–1067	July 30, 2025	
ONE PIECE Log Collection	"GEAR5"	1068–1077	August 27, 2025	
ONE PIECE Log Collection	"MOMONOSUKE"	1078–1088	September 24, 2025	
ONE PIECE Log Collection	"EGGHEAD"	1089–1100	June 24, 2026	
ONE PIECE Log Collection	"STUSSY"	1101–1112	July 29, 2026	
ONE PIECE Log Collection	"KOBY"	1113–1122	August 26, 2026	

=== English ===
In Australia, the Season releases were renamed Collection 43 through 48.

Seasons Nine and Ten, and Collections 22 to 25, were released on DVD only. Beginning with Season Eleven, and half of Collection 26, (Note: Collection 26 contains 27 episodes on DVD, but only 13 episodes on the bundled Blu-rays.) the series began to be released in DVD and Blu-ray combo packs.

Crunchyroll LLC (North America – Region 1/A); Crunchyroll UK and Ireland (UK and Ireland – Region 2/B); Madman Entertainment (Australia and New Zealand – Region 4/B)
Volume		Episodes	Release date			ISBN	Ref.
Volume		Episodes	NA	UK & IE	AUS & NZ	ISBN	Ref.
Season Fourteen	Voyage One	892–903	December 10, 2024	N/A	N/A	ISBN N/A	
Season Fourteen	Voyage Two	904–916	February 4, 2025	N/A	N/A	ISBN N/A	
Season Fourteen	Voyage Three	917–928	March 25, 2025	N/A	N/A	ISBN N/A	
Season Fourteen	Voyage Four	929–940	May 27, 2025	N/A	N/A	ISBN N/A	
Season Fourteen	Voyage Five	941–952	June 24, 2025	N/A	N/A	ISBN N/A	
Season Fourteen	Voyage Six	953–964	August 19, 2025	N/A	N/A	ISBN N/A	
Season Fourteen	Voyage Seven	965–976	November 25, 2025	N/A	N/A	ISBN N/A	
Season Fourteen	Voyage Eight	977–988	January 26, 2026	N/A	N/A	ISBN N/A	
Season Fourteen	Voyage Nine	989–1000	April 6, 2026	N/A	N/A	ISBN N/A	
Season Fourteen	Voyage Ten	1001–1012	August 18, 2026	N/A	N/A	ISBN N/A	
Season Fourteen	Voyage Eleven	1013–1024	December 1, 2026	N/A	N/A	ISBN N/A	
Season Fourteen	Voyage Twelve	1025–1036	TBA	N/A	N/A	ISBN N/A	
Season Fourteen	Voyage Thirteen	1037–1048	TBA	N/A	N/A	ISBN N/A	
Season Fourteen	Voyage Fourteen	1049–1061.5	TBA	N/A	N/A	ISBN N/A	
Season Fourteen	Voyage Fifteen	1062–1073	TBA	N/A	N/A	ISBN N/A	
Season Fourteen	Voyage Sixteen	1074–1085	TBA	N/A	N/A	ISBN N/A	
Season Fifteen	Voyage One	1086–1096	TBA	N/A	N/A	ISBN N/A	
Season Fifteen	Voyage Two	1097–1108	TBA	N/A	N/A	ISBN N/A	
Season Fifteen	Voyage Three	1108.5–1122	TBA	N/A	N/A	ISBN N/A	
Season Fifteen	Voyage Four	1123–1133	TBA	N/A	N/A	ISBN N/A	
Season Fifteen	Voyage Five	1133.5–1143	TBA	N/A	N/A	ISBN N/A	
Season Fifteen	Voyage Six	1144–1155	TBA	N/A	N/A	ISBN N/A	
One Piece Film Red		1029–1030, SP–4	July 11, 2023	N/A	N/A	ISBN N/A	
Collection	37	892–916	April 8, 2025	August 25, 2025	N/A	ISBN N/A	
Collection	38	917–940	August 26, 2025	October 6, 2025	N/A	ISBN N/A	
Collection	39	941–964	November 25, 2025	December 15, 2025	N/A	ISBN N/A	
Collection	40	965–988	October 20, 2026	October 26, 2026	N/A	ISBN N/A	
