= Luffy's Peak - Attained! Fifth Gear =

- One Piece episode
- Episode no.: Season 20; Episode 180
- Directed by: Tatsuya Nagamine
- Written by: Atsuhiro Tomioka
- Original air date: August 6, 2023
- Running time: 23 minutes

Episode chronology
← Previous "Luffy is Defeated?! The Determination of Those Left Behind"	Next → "The Ridiculous Power! Fifth Gear in Full Play"

"Luffy's Peak - Attained! Fifth Gear" (Note: Japanese: ルフィの最高地点 到達！〝ギア5〟, Hepburn: Rufi no Saikō Chiten - Tōtatsu! "Gia Fifusu") is the one thousand seventy-first overall episode of the Japanese anime television series One Piece, which is based on the manga of the same name. The episode was directed by Tatsuya Nagamine and written by Atsuhiro Tomioka. It originally premiered on Fuji Television on August 6, 2023. In the episode, set during the Wano Country arc, Monkey D. Luffy finishes transforming into Fifth Gear after awakening his Gum-Gum Fruit's true power, revealed to be the Mythical Zoan-type Human-Human Fruit, Model: Nika to continue his final fight with Kaido, having been defeated by him earlier.

== Plot ==
In the previous episode, Kaido kills Luffy following the intervention of a CP0 agent and declared victory over him. Following that, Zunesha tells Momonosuke that she has heard the "Drums of Liberation" for the first time in over 800 years and that Joy Boy has returned, while Luffy undergoes a mysterious transformation that revives him. On the top of the Skull Dome, Luffy eventually revives after finishing his transformation, having fully awakened his Devil Fruit's true power. His hair becomes flame-like and white, as do his clothes, while his eyebrows become swirled and billowing. His irises turn pink, and a scarf of clouds floating above his shoulders appears as the ground becomes like rubber. He laughs uncontrollably, overcome with elation. The transformation alerts the others below, Nami and Tama, overjoyed with tearful happiness that Luffy is still alive. Meanwhile, the Five Elders discuss the sacrifice of one of their top agents in an attempt to stop Luffy. It's revealed that The World Government had been attempting to obtain the Gum-Gum Fruit for 800 years. Luffy is the first one to awaken this fruit since Joyboy. One of the Elders mentions that Zoan Devil Fruits can have a will of their own, revealing that the Gum-Gum Fruit's true identity is actually a Mythical Zoan Devil Fruit called Human-Human Fruit, Model: Nika.

When the user awakens their Devil Fruit's true power, they transform into the legendary Sun God Nika, with power and freedom limited only by their imagination, The Five Elders declares the Mythical Zoan Devil Fruit to be the most ridiculously powerful ability in the world. Meanwhile, in the treasure repository, Orochi tries to persuade Hiyori to remove his Seastone nail and set him free. However, following his numerous betrayals and wrongdoings against Kouzuki Oden and the people of Wano Country during his reign, Hiyori is enraged and refuses. The armory explosion has reduced Kazenbo to a small wisp, which appears and returns to its master. Orochi orders Kazenbo to burn Hiyori alive. However, Kazenbo does not listen and instead sets Orochi on fire while he remains trapped beneath the rubble. On the rooftop, Luffy claims that he can now fight for longer periods of time and declares his new form to be his peak; "Fifth Gear". After fully recovering, Luffy unleashes the extremely powerful Conqueror's Haki, which reaches the Beast Pirates on the Performance Floor below. He grabs Kaido's dragon body and drags it back above the rooftop, beating him with minimal resistance. Kaido unleashes a Blast Breath on Luffy, but he blocks the fireball by pulling up on the ground. The fireball bounces off the wall, striking Kaido. Despite being unable to hit Luffy, Kaido expresses relief that he is still alive and apologizes for the CP0 agent sabotaging their fight. Luffy accepts the apology and plans to finish his final decisive fight with him.

== Production and broadcast ==
"Luffy's Peak - Attained! Fifth Gear", along with the rest of the series, was produced by Toei Animation and is based on the manga of the same name by creator Eiichiro Oda. It was directed by Tatsuya Nagamine and written by screenwriter Atsuhiro Tomioka. Animation for the episode was directed by Midori Matsuda and Keita Saitō, as well as Weilin Zhang, who was not credited. The episode is an adaptation of chapter 1044 of the manga, which is depicted in fifteen pages from pages 2 to 17.

Nagamine stated that they were attempting to "do it just like in the manga" and expressed that animators working on the episode were "very enthusiastic", adding that he was being cautious with adopting it from the original version from the manga and expanded "beyond what they had initially imagined". He also said that "many people gathered around the world to work on Gear 5". Nagamine described the Liberation part as "breaking free from the laws and physics of the world" and revealed that despite the director questioning the transformation and having Luffy's voice actor Mayumi Tanaka to cut down the laughter for the character, she was able to exceed their expectations. A first look at the episode, showcasing Luffy's transformation, was released on July 21 during One Piece Day 2023, while an official preview after episode 1070 was aired the following week. A animatic of a scene from the episode was shown on August 10 of that year.

"Luffy's Peak - Attained! Fifth Gear" was initially broadcast in Japan on Fuji Television and other channels on August 6, 2023, while the English dub debuted in the United States on May 5, 2024. The episode was released on the streaming service Crunchyroll. In Spain, Cines Filmax confirmed a limited theatrical release of the episode, starting on the same day as its release, and would contained previous debuts of Luffy's gear transformations.

== Reception ==
In Video Research's audience measurements, the episode earned a household rating of 3.9 and ranked four in the Kantō region. Various places reportedly held screenings of the episode. Before the episode was released on Crunchyroll, the website experienced an overload that lasted for nearly an hour, before being resolved. On Twitter, hashtags such as #Luffy, #Gear5 and #ONEPIECE1071 become trending, following the episode's release. Anime News Network writer Grant Jones stated that the episode was "a delight from start to finish", praising the animation and sound design, comparing it to those of Looney Tunes. Screen Rant writer Ken Mar ranked the episode in second place among of the best episodes in the One Piece anime series, saying that "even if other episodes were more emotional, it's hard to top this one in terms of epicness and general impact".
