= List of One Piece characters =

Collage of several characters of One Piece, including the Straw Hats, other pirates, employees of the World Government, among other supporting characters

The One Piece manga features an extensive cast of characters created by Eiichiro Oda. The series takes place in a fictional universe where vast numbers of pirates, soldiers, revolutionaries, and other adventurers fight each other, using various superhuman abilities. The majority of the characters are human, but the cast also includes dwarfs, giants, mermen and mermaids, fish-men, (Note: Fish-men are humanoid sea creatures in One Piece whose upper body resembles that of sea creatures. They are contrasted with mermen who have the upper half of a human and the bottom half of a fish.^{[vol. 23:SBS]}) sky people, and minks, (Note: Minks are a race of anthropomorphic mammals.) among many others. Many of the characters possess abilities gained by eating "Devil Fruits". The series' storyline follows the adventures of a group of pirates known as the Straw Hats as they search for the mythical "One Piece" treasure despite the opposition of the World Government and the Four Emperors.

Monkey D. Luffy is the series' main protagonist, a young pirate who wishes to succeed Gold Roger, the deceased King of the Pirates, by finding his treasure, the "One Piece". Throughout the series, Luffy gathers himself a diverse crew: the three-sword-wielding combatant Roronoa Zoro (sometimes referred to as Roronoa Zolo in the English manga); the thief and navigator Nami; the cowardly marksman and inventor Usopp; the cook and modified human Sanji; the anthropomorphic reindeer and doctor Tony Tony Chopper; the archaeologist Nico Robin; the cyborg shipwright Franky; the living skeleton musician Brook; and the Fish-Man helmsman Jimbei. Together they sail the seas in pursuit of their dreams, encountering other pirates, bounty hunters, criminal organizations, revolutionaries, secret agents and soldiers of the corrupt World Government, and various other friends and foes.

== Pirates ==
=== Straw Hats ===
The protagonists of the One Piece series, the Straw Hats. From left to right: Nico Robin, Nami, Brook, Sanji, Monkey D. Luffy (front), Jimbei (back), Tony Tony Chopper, Roronoa Zoro, Franky, and Usopp.

The protagonists of the One Piece series are all the members of the Straw Hat Crew (麦わらの一味, Mugiwara no Ichimi), (Note: Also called the Straw Hat Pirates in some media.) a crew of ten pirates captained by Monkey D. Luffy. The crew's number increases throughout the series, as Luffy recruits new members. Once Usopp joins the Straw Hat Crew, they gain their own ship, the Going Merry, which is later destroyed and replaced by a larger and more powerful vessel, the Thousand Sunny created by their shipwright Franky.

Two years later, the Straw Hats gain a new fleet, called the Straw Hat Grand Fleet, consisting of 5,640 pirates from seven different crews; Luffy objects to the idea of being a fleet commander and organizes his new army in a way that they may act independently, but when one crew is in trouble, the others must do what they can to help them. By the end of the Wano Country Arc, the Straw Hat Crew are recognized as an Emperor-led crew with Luffy being recognized as the leader of the Straw Hat Grand Fleet^{[ch. 903]} and the other nine members as its Senior Officers.^{[ch. 1058]}

== World Government ==
The World Government (Japanese: 世界政府, Hepburn: Sekai Seifu) is a global empire that rules over the world.^{[ch. 398]}

== Characters by location ==
Some major and supporting male characters of the series. By row, from left to right:
1. (Top) Blackbeard, Buggy, Sengoku, Aokiji, Dracule Mihawk, Shanks
2. Bartholomew Kuma, Smoker, Whitebeard, Koby
3. Kaku (in giraffe-human hybrid form), Donquixote Doflamingo, Bellamy, Monkey D. Dragon, Pandaman, Portgas D. Ace
4. Rob Lucci (in leopard-human hybrid form) with Hattori, Foxy
5. Arlong, Eneru, Don Krieg
6. (Bottom) Kuro, Spandam and Wapol

Some major and supporting female characters of the series (and the drag queen Bentham). By row, from left to right:
1. (Top) Alvida, Tsuru, Porche, Bentham
2. Nojiko, Tashigi, Hina, Kalifa, Ms. Doublefinger
3. Dr. Kureha, Nefertari Vivi, Maria Onion Bear, Nico Olvia
4. (Bottom) Charlotte Lola (between Kureha and Vivi)

=== East Blue ===
East Blue is the birthplace of Luffy, Zoro, Nami, and Usopp, and the longtime home of Sanji. Pirate King Gol D. Roger was born and executed at Loguetown, an island in the East Blue near Reverse Mountain.

==== Dawn Island ====
Dawn Island is an East Blue island, and Luffy's birthplace.

The Goa Kingdom is located there. Its rulers include:

- Stelly (ステリー, Suterī): Sabo's adoptive brother^{[ch. 586]} and the king of the Goa Kingdom.^{[ch. 823]}^{[ch. 905]} Stelly is voiced by Chika Sakamoto and Kōsuke Toriumi as a child and an adult respectively in the original Japanese version and by Barrett Nash and Brendan Blaber as a child and an adult respectively in the Funimation dub.
- Sally Isntoinette (サリー・ナントカネット, Sarī Nantokanetto): Stelly's wife and the queen of the Goa Kingdom,^{[ch. 823]} being the daughter of the previous king.^{[ch. 905]} Sally Isntoinette is voiced by Yuka Komatsu in the original Japanese version and by Emily Neves in the Funimation dub.

Luffy was born in Windmill Village, a small village in the kingdom. The Red-Haired Pirates regularly visited the village ten years before the series' events. Its citizens include:

- Woop Slap (ウープ・スラップ, Ūpu Surappu): The mayor of the Windmill Village.^{[ch. 1]} Woop Slap is voiced by Shigero Chiba in episodes 0, 4, and 497-505 of the original Japanese version, Takeshi Aono in Episode 45 of the original Japanese version, Keiichi Sonobe in episodes 324 and 878-present of the original Japanese version.
- Makino (マキノ): A bartender and friend of Luffy. She played a huge part in raising Luffy before the age of 7.^{[ch. 1]} Makino is voiced by Makiko Ohmoto in the original Japanese version and by Tara Sands and Gwendolyn Lau in the 4Kids and Funimation dubs respectively. In the live-action series, Makino is portrayed by Kathleen Stephens.

In the kingdom, there is also Mt. Corvo where the Dadan Family lives, a group of bandits, among them:

- Curly Dadan (カーリー・ダダン, Kārī Dadan): The leader of the Dadan Family, who was in charge of raising Luffy, Ace and Sabo. She is voiced by Noriko Uemura in the original Japanese version and by Jessica Cavanagh in the Funimation dub.
- Dogura (ドグラ): A short-size bandit, dressed in overalls and a turban. He is voiced by Kappei Yamaguchi in the original Japanese version and by Michael Jones in the Funimation dub.
- Magura (マグラ): A big-size bandit, with a crest-shaped hairstyle similar to a rooster. He is voiced by Hiroaki Hirata in the original Japanese version and by Newton Pittman in the Funimation dub.

Other inhabitants include:

- Lord of the Coast (近海の主, Kinkai no Nushi): A Sea King who inhabits the waters near Windmill Village. He tried to devour Luffy, but was saved by Shanks, ending up devouring the latter's arm in the act.^{[ch. 1]}
- Higuma (ヒグマ): A bandit active in the mountains of Dawn Island, being the leader of the Higuma Bandits (ヒグマ山賊団, Higuma Sanzoku-dan). He tried to kidnap Luffy when he was a child, taking him to the sea, where he ended up being devoured by the Lord of the Coast.^{[ch. 1]} Higuma is voiced by Yukimasa Kishino in the original Japanese version and by Matt Hoverman and Kyle Hebert in the 4Kids and Funimation dubs respectively. In the live-action series, Higuma is portrayed by Tamer Burjaq.

==== Shells Town ====
Shells Town is the place where Zoro was captured by Helmeppo. The island was under the control of Captain "Axe-Hand" Morgan until he was removed from his position in the Marines.

- Rika (リカ): A girl from Shells Town, who was saved by Zoro when Helmeppo's pet wolf attacked her. To thank him, when Zoro was arrested for said action she brought him rice balls that she had made herself. Rika is voiced by Emi Uwagama in the original Japanese version and by Lisa Ortiz and Kamdynn Gary in the 4Kids and Funimation dubs respectively. In the live-action series, Rika is portrayed by Kamdynn Gary.
- Ririka (リリカ): Rika's mother, who works as a bartender at Shells Town. Ririka is voiced by Yukari Hikida in the original Japanese version and by Cynthia Cranz in the Funimation dub. In the live-action series, Ririka is portrayed by Nicole Fortuin.

==== Shimotsuki Village ====
Shimotsuki Village is Zoro's hometown. It was founded by Wano Country immigrants, including swordsmith Shimotsuki Kozaburo (霜月コウ三郎, Shimotsuki Kōzaburō), creator of legendary sword Enma.

- Shimotsuki Kuina (霜月くいな): Zoro's childhood friend and rival, who vowed to become the best swordsmen in the world. She died at age 10, so Zoro tries to fulfill her dream for both of them.^{[ch. 5]} Kuina is voiced by Machiko Toyoshima in the original Japanese version and by Monica Rial in the Funimation dub (except for the English dub of the video game Unlimited Adventure, where she was voiced by Laura Bailey). In the live-action series, Kuina is portrayed by Audrey Cymone.
- Shimotsuki Koshiro (霜月コウシロウ, Kōshirō): Kuina's father and master of the village dojo. After Kuina's death, Zoro asked him to train him as a swordsman to fulfill his promise to Kuina.^{[ch. 5]} Koshiro is voiced by Unshō Ishizuka in the earlier parts of the original Japanese version and by Kenji Nomura starting in Episode 1030. In the 4Kids and Funimation dubs, he is voiced by Wayne Grayson and Chuck Huber respectively. In the live-action series, he is portrayed by Nathan Castle.

==== Orange Town ====
Orange Town is a town that was under the control of Buggy's Band of Pirates, until they were defeated by Luffy, Zoro and Nami.

Among its inhabitants are:

- Boodle (ブードル, Būdoru): The mayor of the town.^{[ch. 12]} Boodle is voiced by Jōji Yanami in the original Japanese version, and by Michael Sinterniklaas and Mark Stoddard in the 4Kids and Funimation dubs respectively. Boodle is portrayed by Lindsay Reardon in the live-action series.
- Chouchou (シュシュ, Shushu): A dog that was of an old friend of Boodle.^{[ch. 12]} Chouchou's vocal effects are provided by Chieko Atarashi in the original Japanese version and by Christopher Bevins in the Funimation dub.

==== Island of Rare Animals ====
The Island of Rare Animals is home to several animals who are hybrids of two different species.

The hybrids of this island consist of Cocox (a fox/rooster hybrid; his vocal effects are provided by Kentarou Tone in the original Japanese version and by Dan Green in the 4Kids dub), Usagihebi (a rabbit/snake hybrid), Lionbuta (a pig/lion hybrid), Kirinkodanuki (a giraffe/raccoon dog hybrid), and other unnamed hybrids like a giraffe/dog hybrid, a poodle/duck hybrid, and a bear/tiger hybrid.^{[ch. 22,47]} The anime also includes Kabagorilla (a hippopotamus/gorilla hybrid), Kamonohitsuji (a platypus/sheep hybrid), Saikangaroo (a rhinoceros/kangaroo hybrid), and unnamed hybrids like a zebra/ostrich hybrid, a giant panda/bat hybrid, a tiger/elephant hybrid, and a giant cattle/tortoise hybrid. A giant crab also lived near the island until it was killed by Alvida.^{[ch. 50,51]}

The only human inhabitants in the island are:

- Gaimon (ガイモン): A barefoot man with a larger green afro and large beard who was once a normal-sized pirate until his body became trapped in a chest. Gaimon watches over the hybrid animals that live on the Island of Rare Animals.^{[ch. 22]} Gaimon is voiced by Toru Ohira in the original Japanese version and Chafurin in One Piece: Bounty Rush. In the 4Kids and Funimation dubs, he is voiced by Frederick B. Owens and Jonathan C. Osborne respectively.
- Sarfunkel (サーファンクル, Sāfankuru): A barefoot woman with floor-length blonde hair trapped in a barrel and wearing goggles on top of her head, who ended up in the island at some point of the time skip of two years in the story.^{[ch. 620]} She and Gaimon were later listening to Dr. Vegapunk's pre-scheduled broadcast.^{[ch. 1119]}

==== Syrup Village ====
Syrup Village is where Usopp lived with the Usopp Pirates. Yasopp also originates from Syrup Village. The pirate Kuro lived here some years under the "Klahadore" alias.

- Kaya (カヤ): A wealthy girl who lives in a mansion to whom Usopp always told stories to cheer her up. After Usopp's departure, Kaya studies to become a doctor while remaining good friends with the former Usopp Pirates. Kaya is voiced by Mariko Kouda in the original Japanese version and by Tara Sands and Carrie Savage in the 4Kids and Funimation dubs respectively. In the live-action series, Kaya is portrayed by Celeste Loots.
- Merry (メリー, Merī): Kaya's loyal butler. He also built the Going Merry, the Straw Hat Crew' first ship. Merry is voiced by Jin Domon in the original Japanese version and by Ted Lewis and Jerry Jewell in the 4Kids and Funimation dubs respectively. In the live-action series, Merry is portrayed by Brett Williams. Unlike the manga and anime, Merry is Kaya's lawyer who is later killed by Kuro. The Going Merry was named in memory of him.
- Banchina (バンキーナ, Bankīna): Is the deceased mother of Usopp, and wife of Yasopp. Banchina is voiced by Clarine Harp in the Funimation dub. In the live-action series, Banchina is portrayed by Chanté Grainger.

==== Baratie ====
The Baratie is an ocean-going restaurant where Sanji worked.

- Zeff (ゼフ, Zefu): Baratie restaurant's owner and chef, and a former pirate known as "Red Foot", who saved Sanji's life when he was a child. Zeff is voiced by Kōji Yada in the earlier parts of the original Japanese version and by Ben Hiura in the later parts of the original Japanese version. In the English dubs, Zeff is voiced by Robert O'Gorman in the 4Kids dub while the Funimation dub has him voiced by Grant James in earlier episodes and Garrett Schenck in later episodes. In the live-action series, Zeff is portrayed by Craig Fairbrass. The character's epithet is based on the real life buccaneer Red Legs Greaves.
- Patty (パティ, Pati): A cook who works as patissier. Patty is voiced by Tetsu Inada in the original Japanese version and by Robert O'Gorman and Jeremy Inman in the 4Kids and Funimation dub. In the live-action series, Patty is portrayed by Brashaad Mayweather.
- Carne (カルネ, Karune): A cook who works as charcutier. Carne is voiced by Shinobu Satouchi in the original Japanese version (except in Grand Battle! Rush!, where he is voiced by Kozo Shioya) and by Sean Schemmel and Charles C. Campbell in the 4Kids and Funimation dubs respectively.

==== Coco Village ====
Coco Village is Nami's home in the Conomi Islands. For years, the Arlong Pirates also lived near the village, ruling with an iron fist until they were defeated by the Straw Hat Crew.

- Belle-Mère (ベルメール, Berumēru): A former member of the Navy, who adopted Nami and Nojiko after she found them during a war in the East Blue's Oykot Kingdom. She was killed by Arlong when her daughters were kids. Belle-Mère is voiced by Noriko Hidaka in the original Japanese version and by Veronica Taylor and Cynthia Cranz in the 4Kids and Funimation dubs respectively. In the live-action series, she is portrayed by Genna Galloway.
- Nojiko (ノジコ): Nami's adoptive sister who was raised by Belle-Mère after they lost their respective parents in the Oykot Kingdom. Nojiko is voiced by Wakana Yamazaki in the original Japanese version (except in Grand Battle! Rush, where she is voiced by Noriko Yoshitake) and by Tiffany Grant in the Funimation dub while Jad Saxton voiced her younger self in Episode 539. In the live-action series, Nojiko is portrayed by Chioma Umeala, while Kylie Ashfield portrays the character in her youth.
- Genzo (ゲンゾウ, Genzō): The sheriff of Coco Village, who was also a father figure to Nami. Genzo is voiced by Kōzō Shioya in the original Japanese version and by Marc Diraison and Bill Flynn in the 4Kids and Funimation dubs. In the live-action series, Genzo is portrayed by Grant Ross.
- Nako (ナコー, Nakō): The village doctor.
- Johnny (ジョニー, Jonī) and Yosaku (ヨサク): Two former bounty hunters and old friends of Zoro, who accompanied the Straw Hat Crew during their visit to Baratie and Coco Village. After not succeeding in capturing pirates, during the two year timeskip they became fishermen of the Coco Village. Johnny is voiced by Masaya Takatsuka in the original Japanese version and by Dan Green and Christopher Ayres in the 4Kids and Funimation dubs resepectively. Yosaku is voiced by Yasuhiko Tokuyama in the original Japanese version and by Wayne Grayson and Josh Martin in the 4Kids and Funimation dubs respectively.

==== Loguetown ====
Loguetown is a prominent location on the Primestar Islands near the Reverse Mountain where pirate ships stop to resupply. This location was where Gold Roger was executed and where Smoker and Tashigi were formerly stationed.

The known inhabitants of Loguetown are:

- Ipponmatsu (いっぽんマツ): The co-owner of an arms shop. He was the one who gave the Sundai Ketsu and Yubashiri to Roronoa Zola. It was also revealed that Ipponmatsu is the cleaner of Tashigi's sword. Ipponmatsu is voiced by Misato Hirano in the original Japanese version, by Matthew Charles In the 4Kids dub, and by Kenny Green in the Funimation dub. In the live-action series, Ipponmatsu is portrayed by James Hiroyuki Liao.
- Ipponume (いっぽんウメ, Ippon'ume): The co-owner of an arms shop and the wife of Ipponmatsu (she was his mother in the 4Kids dub of the anime).
- Yu (ユウ, Yū): A little girl who accidentally spilled her ice cream cone on Smoker's pants. He did not take offense to this as her father feared and gave Yu money to buy a bigger scoop of ice cream. In the live-action series, Yu is portrayed by Lyra Robinson.
- Sapi (サピー, Sapī): A fishmonger who is the result of a union between a human and a fish-man, having the appearance of a man with a fish tail behind his head. In the anime, Sapi is the announcer for Loguetown's Cooking Championships. Sapi is voiced by Mahito Ōba in the original Japanese version by David Wills in the 4Kids dub, and by Phil Parsons in the Funimation dub. In the live-action series, he is portrayed by Daniel Barnett.
- Hangar (ハンガー, Hangā): A salesman at Robecca Handberg with a hanger-like hairstyle.

There are also several anime-exclusive inhabitants:

- Daddy Masterson (ダディ・マスターソン, Dadi Masutāson): Also known as "Daddy the Father" (子連れのダディ, Kozure no Dadi), Daddy Masterson is a retired member of the Marines who now works as a bounty hunter in Loguetown, where he lives along with his daughter Carol. Usopp faces him in a sniper duel. He is also a former rival of Yasopp. He is voiced by Tōru Furuya in the original Japanese version and by Travis Willingham in the Funimation dub.
- Carol (キャロル, Kyaroru): A young girl who is Daddy Masterson's daughter. She is voiced by Konami Yoshida in the original Japanese version and by Cherami Leigh in the Funimation dub.
- Carmen (カルメン, Karumen): A skilled cook with the style of a flamenco dancer. She faces Sanji in Loguetown's Cooking Competition. Carmen is voiced by Asako Dodo in the original Japanese version, by Eva Kaminsky in the 4Kids dub, and by Brina Palencia in the Funimation dub.

=== North Blue ===
North Blue is the birthplace of Sanji.

==== Lvneel ====
- Aruyutayan V (アルユータヤン五世, Aruyūtayan Gosei): He was the king of Lvneel in ancient times. When Mont Blanc Noland told him about the Golden City, he asked him to take him there. After arriving on Jaya and seeing that the city was nowhere to be found, he thought Noland had lied to him, so he condemned him to be executed.^{[ch. 292]} In the original Japanese version of the anime he is voiced by Masami Kikuchi, while in the Funimation dub he is voiced by Douglass Burks in Episode 189 and by Andy Mullins in Episode of Skypiea.
- Mont Blanc Noland (モンブラン・ノーランド, Monburan Nōrando): A well-known explorer and great botanist from ancient times. One day he found the island of Jaya where he helped the Shandia tribe and became great friends with the tribe's warrior, Kalgara. Later, Noland returned to his kingdom and told of the wonders of the island and its Golden City. Upon returning to Jaya with the king of Lvneel, he saw that the Golden City and the tribe were gone (since, unbeknownst to him, an updraft had carried them up to the sky). As a result, he was accused of lying and ordered to be executed. Noland's name became synonymous with liar throughout history, even among his descendants (including Mont Blanc Cricket). Noland is voiced by Hōchū Ōtsuka in the original Japanese version, and by Daniel Penz in the Funimation dub.

==== Germa Kingdom ====
Germa 66
Name	Title	Anime voice actor(s)		Live actor(s)
Name	Title	JP	US	Live actor(s)
Judge	Supreme Commander	Hideyuki Hori	Christopher Bevins	TBD
Reiju (0)	Poison Pink	Michiko Neya	Alexis Tipton	TBD
Ichiji (1)	Sparking Red	Noriaki Sugiyama Masami Suzuki	Howard Wang Apphia Yu	TBD
Niji (2)	Shock Blue	Atsushi Miyauchi Yūko Mita	Austin Tindle Trina Nishimura	TBD
Sanji (3)	Stealth Black	Hiroaki Hirata	David Moo Eric Vale	Taz Skylar
Yonji (4)	Winch Green	Kenjiro Tsuda Akemi Okamura	Clifford Chapin Meli Grant	TBD

The Germa Kingdom (ジェルマ王国, Jeruma Ōkoku) is Sanji's fatherland. It is ruled by the Vinsmoke Family (ヴィンスモーク家, Vinsumōku-ke) who are also the leaders of the Germa 66 (ジェルマ 66, Jeruma Daburu Shikkusu; pronounced "Germa Double-Six"), the military branch of the kingdom and an Underworld mercenary force, and Sanji's biological family.

- Vinsmoke Judge (ヴィンスモーク・ジャッジ, Vinsumōku Jajji): The ruler of the Germa Kingdom, patriarch of the Vinsmoke Family, supreme commander of Germa 66, and Sanji's father. As a former member of MADS, he is a skilled scientist who specialized in engineering, giving his children their respective enhancements. He was extremely abusive to Sanji, enabling his siblings' harassment and declaring him a shame for not awakening his enhancements. Despite this, he loved his son enough to save him from arranged marriage after the Big Mom Pirates' betrayal. After Big Mom's defeat, he cooperates with former MADS colleague Caesar Clown to form NEO MADS to surpass Vegapunk, only to be dismayed by the news of Vegapunk's death on Egghead.^{[ch. 1078,1113]} Judge is voiced by Hideyuki Hori in the original Japanese version and by Christopher Bevins in the Funimation dub.
- Vinsmoke Sora (ヴィンスモーク・ソラ, Vinsumōku Sora): Sanji's mother, who died when he was a child. She deeply cares for her children, especially Sanji for retaining his emotions. Sora is voiced by Yuriko Yamamoto in the original Japanese version and by Kristen McGuire in the Funimation dub.
- Vinsmoke Reiju (ヴィンスモーク・レイジュ, Vinsumōku Reiju): Sanji's older sister who has great strength and wields the Poison Pink which enables her to suck the poison out of people. Despite partaking in her sibling's harassment of Sanji, she truly cared for him and motivated him to escape Germa 66 to pursue his dream. Their relationship is likewise less hostile than Sanji's relations with his brothers.^{[ch. 841]} Reiju is voiced by Michiko Neya in the original Japanese version and by Alexis Tipton in the Funimation dub.
- Vinsmoke Ichiji (ヴィンスモーク・イチジ, Vinsumōku Ichiji): One of Sanji's two older quadruplet brothers who has the Sparking Red ability, enabling him to emit light beams from his eyes and hands. He partakes in bullying Sanji in his childhood with his siblings. Ichiji is voiced by Noriaki Sugiyama as an adult in the original Japanese version, Masami Suzuki as a boy in the original Japanese version, Howard Wang as an adult in the Funimation dub, and Apphia Yu as a boy in the Funimation dub.
- Vinsmoke Niji (ヴィンスモーク・ニジ, Vinsumōku Niji): One of Sanji's two older quadruplet brothers who has Dengeki Blue enabling him to use a form of electrokinesis. He partakes in bullying Sanji in his childhood with his siblings. Niji is voiced by Atsushi Miyauchi as an adult in the original Japanese version, Yūko Mita as a boy in the original Japanese version, Austin Tindle as an adult in the Funimation dub, and Trina Nishimura as a boy in the Funimation dub.
- Vinsmoke Yonji (ヴィンスモーク・ヨンジ, Vinsumōku Yonji): Sanji's younger quadruplet brother who has Winch Green enabling him to extend his hands outward. He partakes in bullying Sanji in his childhood with his siblings. Yonji is voiced by Kenjiro Tsuda as an adult in the original Japanese version, Akemi Okamura as a boy in the original Japanese version, Clifford Chapin as an adult in the Funimation dub, and by Meli Grant as a boy in the Funimation dub.

=== West Blue ===
West Blue is the birthplace of Nico Robin and Brook.

==== Ohara ====
Ohara (オハラ) is an island primarily inhabited by archaeologists and the birthplace of Nico Robin. Their library was held within the gigantic 5,000 year old Tree of Knowledge. The island's surface was destroyed 22 years ago by a Buster Call sanctioned by the World Government because they were researching information regarding the Void Century and the associated Poneglyph. Following what became known as the Ohara incident, several giants from Elbaph were recruited by Jaguar D. Saul and visited Ohara, where they salvaged the surviving books for safekeeping.

The following are Ohara's residential archaeologists who were also called the "Devils of Ohara" (オハラの悪魔達, Ohara no Akuma-tachi)^{[ch. 394]} by the World Government:

- Clou D. Clover (クラウ・D・クローバー, Kurau Dī Kurōbā): Commonly known as Professor Clover (クローバー博士, Kurōbā-hakase), he was the director of the Ohara Library and the leader of Ohara's archaeologists.^{[ch. 391]} He died 22 years ago through Ohara's Buster Call, summoned due to the archaeologists' forbidden research on the Void Century.^{[ch. 398]} Clou D. Clover is voiced by Kōichi Kitamura in the original Japanese version except for episode 1042, where he was voiced by Minoru Inaba. In the Funimation dub, he is voiced by Kent Williams.
- Nico Olvia (ニコ･オルビア, Niko Orubia): She was the mother of Nico Robin,^{[ch. 392]} and an archaeologist who studied the Poneglyphs.^{[ch. 392]} As a result, she was captured by the Navy for conducting forbidden research. With the help of Jaguar D. Saul, she was able to return to Ohara and briefly reunite with her daughter, before dying alongside the other Ohara residents due to the Buster Call.^{[ch. 398]} Nico Olvia is voiced by Yuriko Yamaguchi in the original Japanese version and by Stephanie Young in the Funimation dub.
- Rint (リント, Rinto): An archaeologist on Ohara who was killed during the destruction of the Tree of Knowledge. Rint is voiced by Rikiku Hanioka in the original Japanese version and by Martha Harms in the Funimation dub.
- Zadie (ゼイディー, Zeidī): An archaeologist on Ohara who was killed during the destruction of the Tree of Knowledge. Zadie is voiced by Masaya Takatsuka in the original Japanese version and by Craig Dvorak in the Funimation dub.
- Roche (ロシュ, Roshu): A bespectacled archaeologist on Ohara who was killed during the destruction of the Tree of Knowledge. Roche is voiced by Mahito Ōba in the original Japanese version and by Ben Holmes in the Funimation dub.
- Busshiri (ブッシリ): A large-chinned archaeologist on Ohara who was killed during the destruction of the Tree of Knowledge. Busshiri is voiced by Takahiro Fujimoto in the original Japanese version.
- Hack (ハック, Hakku): A round-nosed archaeologist on Ohara who was killed during the destruction of the Tree of Knowledge.
- Hocha (ホチャ): A tall archaeologist on Ohara who was killed during the destruction of the Tree of Knowledge. Hocha is voiced by Keiji Hirai in the original Japanese version and by Christopher Wehkamp in the Funimation dub.
- Gram (グラム, Guramu): An archaeologist on Ohara with short blonde hair who was killed during the destruction of the Tree of Knowledge. Gram is voiced by Kozue Kamada in the original Japanese version and by Jamie Marchi in the Funimation dub.

These are other inhabitants of Ohara:

- Roji (ロジ): Roji is a housewife who is the sister-in-law of Nico Olvia and the aunt of Nico Robin. She was abusive towards Robin and treated her like a slave. During the Buster Call, Roji attempted to escape on a refugee ship, only to be killed when Sakazuki destroyed the ship. Roji is voiced by Noriko Uemura in the original Japanese version and by Jessica Cavanaugh in the Funimation dub.
- Oran (オラン): Oran is the younger brother of Nico Olvia, the husband of Roji, and the uncle of Nico Robin. She treated Nico Robin well and often dealt with Roji's temper. During the Buster Call, Oran attempted to escape on a refugee ship, only to be killed when Sakazuki destroyed the ship. Oran is voiced by Masaya Takatsuka in the original Japanese version and by Randy Pearlman in the Funimation dub.
- Mizuira (ミズイラ): Mizuira is the daughter of Roji and Oran, the niece of Nico Olvia, and the cousin of Nico Robin. She is presumed to be among those who died when Sakazuki blew up the refugee ship during the Buster Call.

==== Kingdom of Esperia ====
The Kingdom of Esperia (エスペリア王国) is a former country in the West Blue which consisted of musicians that existed 90 years before the series' timeskip and is also the birthplace of Brook. The Holy Knight of God Manmayer Gunko was born here as Princess Shuri.

- Reuven (ルーヴェン) was the king of Esperia 70 years ago. 79 years ago, he found the orphan Brook at a landfill, befriending him while pretending to be a commoner despite being a prince. After rescuing Brook, who was caught stealing curry powder from the Navy, he took in Brook and sponsored his education, allowing him to become the leader of the country's battle convoy.^{[ch.. 1184]} He was eventually killed by Shuri for unknown reasons.^{[ch.. 1173]}
- Candelle (キャンデル) was the queen of Esperia 70 years ago and the former leader of the battle convoy.^{[ch.. 1183]}

=== South Blue ===
South Blue is the birthplace of Franky.

==== Baterilla ====
- Portgas D. Rouge (ポートガス・D・ルージュ, Pōtogasu Dī Rūju): She was the lover of Gol D. Roger and the mother of Portgas D. Ace. Portgas delayed her pregnancy for twenty months through sheer willpower to deceive the world of Ace's connection to the Pirate King.^{[ch. 550]} However, holding Ace for so long led to her death from exhaustion after giving birth.^{[ch. 551]}

==== Evil Black Drum Kingdom ====
The Evil Black Drum Kingdom (悪ブラックドラム王国, Waru Burakku Doramu Ōkoku) is a kingdom that is currently ruled by Wapol since he was defeated by Luffy in Drum Kingdom.

===== Wapol =====
Wapol (ワポル, Waporu) is the King of the Evil Black Drum Kingdom and former King of the Drum Kingdom, as well as the former captain of the Bliking Pirates. He ate the Paramecia-type Munch-Munch Fruit (バクバクの実, Baku Baku no Mi), which allows him to eat virtually anything and take on its properties, or merge beings and objects together into a single entity.^{[ch. 147]} Initially overthrown and exiled by Dalton for his selfish and despicable behavior, he masqueraded as a pirate crew with his men to usurp the throne, only to be defeated by a passing Monkey D. Luffy.^{[ch. 151]}

Falling into poverty, Wapol gradually regained his status and turned over a new leaf after toys produced by his Devil Fruit ability became highly popular, forming a successful conglomerate and eventually his own kingdom after marrying Miss Universe.^{[ch. 262]}

The 9th One Piece movie titled Episode of Chopper Plus: Bloom in Winter, Miracle Sakura, which serves as a retelling of the Drum Island storyline, includes as an addition to the plot that Wapol has an older brother named Musshuru.

Wapol is voiced by Bin Shimada in the Japanese version and by Matt Hoverman and Andy Mullins in the 4Kids and Funimation dub respectively.

In the live-action series, Wapol is portrayed by Rob Colletti. Unlike the anime and manga, Wapol got his Devil Fruit from Miss All Sunday to help reclaim Drum Island. Rather than combine Chess and Kuromarimo into one body, he instead fuses his soldiers with different weapons. These soldiers regressed back to normal after his defeat.

===== Other Evil Black Drum Kingdom residents =====
- Kinderella (キンデレラ, Kinderera): Known as Miss Universe, who is Wapol's wife and the queen of the Evil Black Drum Kingdom.^{[ch. 906]} Kinderella is voiced by Rachel Thompson in the Funimation dub.
- Hakowan (ハコワン): Wapol's pet dog who has a robotic head obtained by Wapol's powers.^{[ch. 249]}

==== Sorbet Kingdom ====
- Bartholomew Kuma was born in the kingdom, and was the king after Bekori and before Bulldog.^{[ch. 1095-1100]}
- Jewelry Bonney raised in the kingdom as Kuma's adoptive daughter, becoming the kingdom's princess.^{[ch. 1095-1100]}
- Ginny lived in the kingdom for several years.^{[ch. 1095-1100]}
- Conney (コニー, Konī): The queen dowager and Bulldog's mother. She helped Bonney escape the Sorbet Kingdom and become a pirate.^{[ch. 1095-1100]} Conney is voided by Reiko Suzuki in the original Japanese version of the anime, and by Laurie Steele in the Funimation dub.
- Bulldog (ブルドッグ, Burudoggu): Conney's son, who was the king of the Sorbet Kingdom before Bekori dethroned him, and again after Kuma became a fugitive.^{[ch. 1095-1100]} Bulldog is voided by Uoken in the original Japanese version of the anime, and by Campbell Cooley in the Funimation dub.
- Bekori (ベコリ): The evil king overthrown by Kuma after attempting mass killings against his subjects.^{[ch. 1095-1100]} Bekori is voided by Yasuhiro Kikuchi in the original Japanese version of the anime, and by Tom Henry in the Funimation dub.

=== Paradise, Grand Line ===
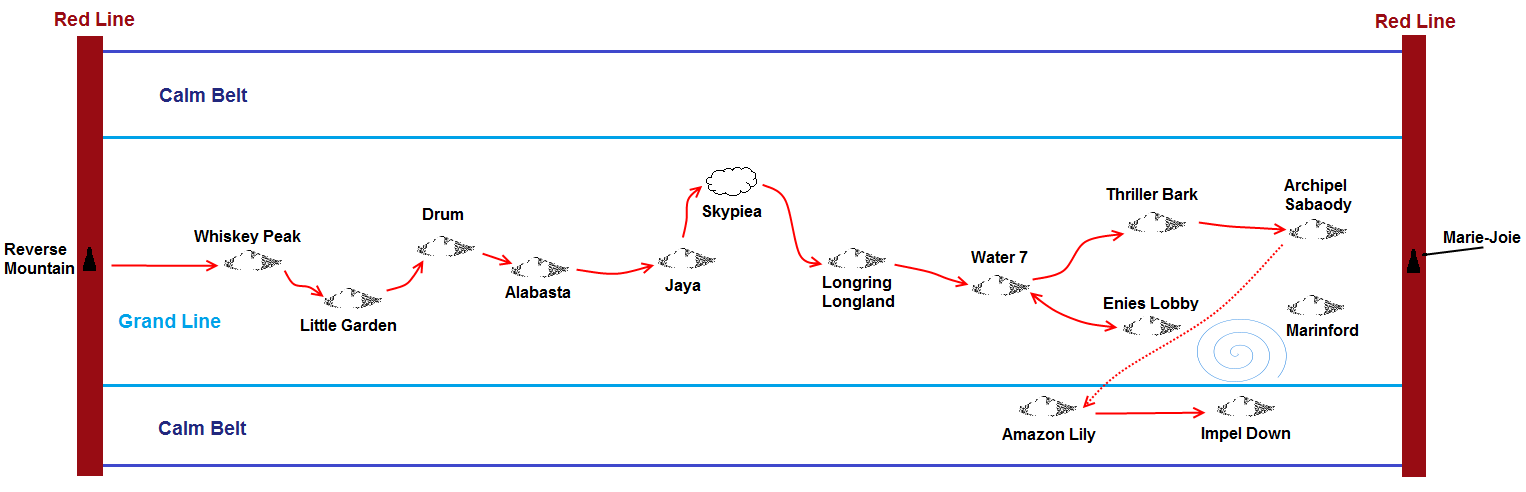
The Paradise route that Monkey D. Luffy travels on in the series

Paradise is the first half of the Grand Line, and the birthplace of Tony Tony Chopper.

==== Reverse Mountain ====
Reverse Mountain (リヴァース・マウンテン, Rivāsu Maunten) is located on the Red Line and must be crossed to enter the Grand Line. It is mostly uninhabitable outside of the Twin Capes, the exit of the mountain on the Paradise side. Crocus resides here as the lighthouse keeper.

- Laboon (ラブーン, Rabūn): A giant Island Whale who is acquainted with Brook. For years, Laboon was waiting in the Reverse Mountain for the return of the Rumbar Pirates who left him in the care of Crocus.

==== Drum Island ====
Drum Island (ドラム島, Doramu-tō) is an island with an Arctic climate and the birthplace of Tony Tony Chopper. Wapol was the ruler of Drum Island before he was overthrown, with the Bliking Pirates being former members of his court.

The island is named after its drum-shaped mountains. Said mountains were inspired by the hoodoos at Drumheller, Canada.

Its inhabitants include:

- Dalton (ドルトン, Doruton): The former Chief Royal Guard of Wapol during his rule and was chronologically the first Zoan Devil Fruit user introduced, possessing the power of the Ox-Ox Fruit: Model Bison which enables him to turn into a bison or a bison-human hybrid. In a flashback, Dalton used his Devil Fruit power to get Tony Tony Chopper to leave after Hiriluk's murder. When Wapol was defeated by Monkey D. Luffy, the people of Drum Island made him the new King of Drum Island. Dalton is voiced by Kenichi Ono in the original Japanese version and by Ted Lewis and J. Michael Tatum in the 4Kids and Funimation dubs respectively. In the live-action series, Dalton is portrayed by Ty Keogh.
- Hiriluk (ヒルルク, Hiruruku): Hiriluk was a doctor on Drum Island and former thief who took in Tony Tony Chopper and taught him how to be a doctor until he was killed by Wapol. Hiriluk is voiced by Shigero Ushiyama in the original Japanese version and by Marc Diraison and Mark Stoddart in the Funimation dub. In the live-action series, Hiriluk is portrayed by Mark Harelik.
- Kureha (くれは): She is a doctor in her 100s who took in Tony Tony Chopper following Hiriluk's death. She and Tony Tony Chopper were responsible for curing Nami of the Five-Day Disease. After Wapol was defeated, Kureha launched Hiriluk's last creation into the sky as a farewell to him and a departing Chopper. She later led the Isshi-100. Kureha is voiced by Masako Nozawa in the original Japanese version and by Maddie Blaustein and Julie Mayfield in the 4Kids and Funimation dubs respectively. In the live-action series, Kureha is portrayed by Katey Sagal.
- Maria Onion Bear (ネギ熊まりあ, Negikuma Maria): (Note: In the English dubs for the anime being called Mrs. Negi in the Funimation dub and Big Mama in the 4Kids dub.) Maria Onion Bear is a civilian from Drum Island whom Luffy and Usopp mistake for a Hiking Bear. She is voiced by Noriko Yoshitake in the original Japanese version and by Wendy Powell in the Funimation dub. In the live-action series, she is portrayed by Candice van Litsenborgh.

==== Kingdom of Alabasta ====
Alabasta

The Alabasta Kingdom (アラバスタ王国, Arabasuta Oukoku) (Note: Often also spelled as Arabasta; also named as Alabaster in the English dub of One Piece: Unlimited Adventure.) is a desert climate-type Summer Island in the Grand Line. The Straw Hats have been welcomed here because they helped to save the kingdom.

The environment and culture of the kingdom are mainly inspired by Egypt.

===== Nefertari family =====
- Nefertari Cobra (ネフェルタリ・コブラ, Neferutari Kobura): (Note: Surname spelled as Nefeltari in the Viz Media translation of the manga and in the 4Kids English dub of the anime.) The twelfth king of Alabasta Kingdom,^{[ch. 155]} and the father of Nefertari Vivi. Following the time skip, Cobra is murdered by the Five Elders and Imu, with Sabo being framed for Cobra's death. Nefetari Cobra is voiced by Iemasa Kayumi in earlier episodes, Yasuhiko Tokuyama in Grand Battle! Rush, Toshiya Ueda in Episode 512, and Hozumi Gōda in later episodes of the original Japanese version. In the English dub, he is voiced by David Zen Mansley and Kyle Hebert in the 4Kids and Funimation dubs respectively. In the live-action series, he is portrayed by Sendhil Ramamurthy.
- Nefertari Titi (ネフェルタリ・ティティ, Neferutari Titi): The deceased wife of Nefertari Cobra, and mother of Nefertari Vivi. She died when Vivi was very young.
- Nefertari Vivi is Cobra and Titi's daughter and the princess of Alabasta.
  - Karoo, a Super Spot-Billed Duck, is Vivi's pet.

===== Alabasta Royal Guard =====
The Alabasta Royal Guard is Alabasta's army.

- Igaram (イガラム, Igaramu): The captain of the Alabasta Royal Guard. A man who fights with a saxophone that shoots bullets when played^{[ch. 109]} and guns hidden in his hair that fire when he pulls his necktie.^{[ch. 109]} Along with Nefertari Vivi, he infiltrated the Baroque Works organization, where he acquired the alias Mr. 8. He is voiced by Keiichi Sonobe in the original Japanese version, by Richard Will in the 4Kids dub, and by Rob Mungle in the Funimation dub. In the live-action series, Igaram is portrayed by Yonda Thomas.
- Chaka (チャカ): Next in line after Igaram along with Pell, dubbed the strongest warriors of Alabasta, with the ability to transform into a jackal or a jackal-human hybrid thanks to the powers of the Dog-Dog Fruit: Model Jackal. Chaka is voiced by Kihachirō Uemura in the original Japanese version and by Russell Velazquez and Robert McCollum in the 4Kids and Funimation dubs respectively. In the live-action series, Chaka will be portrayed by Nabeel Khan.
- Pell (ペル, Peru): Next in line after Igaram along with Chaka, dubbed the strongest warriors of Alabasta, with the ability to transform into a falcon or a falcon-human hybrid via the Bird-Bird Fruit: Model Falcon. Pell is voiced by Kenji Nomura in the original Japanese version and by Matt Hoverman and Kevin M. Connolly in the 4Kids and Funimation dub respectively. In the live-action series, Pell will be portrayed by Jamie Ward.
- The Tsumegeri Guards (ツメゲリ部隊, Tsumegeri Butai) are members of the Alabasta Royal Guard. They consist of Hyota (ヒョウタ, Hyōta), Brahm (ブラーム, Burāmu), Arrow (アロー, Arō), and Barrel (バレル, Bareru). When Sir Crocodile invaded the palace, the Tsumegeri Guards tried to demand that he release their king. When Crocodile refuses, they drank the Hero Water to fight Crocodile, ultimately dying from the Hero Water's side effects.^{[ch. 196]} In the 4Kids dub, the Guards are called the Kicking Claw Force and are paralyzed by the water rather than dying. In the original Japanese version of the anime, Hyota, Brahm and Arrow are voiced by Takahiro Suzuki, Takurou Takasaki and Katsuya Fujiwara, respectively.

===== Alabasta Palace Staff =====
The following make up the Palace Staff who work for the Alabasta royal family:

- Terracotta (テラコッタ, Terakotta): A head chef and seamstress for the Alabasta royal family, and the wife of Igaram, who appeared sometime after Sir Crocodile and Baroque Works were defeated. Terracotta is voiced by Keiichi Sonobe in the original Japanese version, by David Wills in the 4Kids dub, and by Antimere Robinson in the Funimiation dub.
- Maidy (メイディ, Meidi): The lady's maid of the Alabasta royal family who works under Terracotta. Maidy was voiced by Masumi Kageyama in episode 129 of the original Japanese version and by Ai Kawashima in One Piece Movie: The Desert Princess and the Pirates: Adventures in Alabasta.
- Dr. Ho (Dr.ホウ, Dokutā Hō): The royal doctor of the Alabasta royal family. Ho is voiced by Shūichi Ikeda in the original Japanese version and by Bill Flynn in the Funimation dub.

===== Alabasta Rebel Army =====
The Alabasta Rebel Army is a group led by Koza. Some of the Rebel Army made up the Sand Sand Clan that Koza and Nefertari Vivi were part of when they were younger, while Sir Crocodile planted Mr. Love and Baroque Works agents in their ranks to further his plot. The Alabasta Rebel Army has at least 300,000 members.

- Koza (コーザ, Kōza): Vivi's childhood friend and later rebel leader of the Alabasta Rebellion. Sometime after Sir Crocodile and Baroque Works' defeat, he became Alabasta Kingdom's Minister of Environment. Koza is voiced by Takeshi Kusao in the original Japanese version, with Naomi Shindō voicing his younger self. In the English dub, he is voiced by Jonathan Todd Ross and Todd Haberkorn in the 4Kids and Funimation dubs respectively. In the live-action series, Koza will be portrayed by Emilio Sakraya.
- Erik (エリック, Erikku): A member of the Rebel Army from Suiren. Erik is voiced by Scott Freeman in the Funimation dub and by J. Michael Tatum in One Piece Movie: The Desert Princess and the Pirates: Adventures in Alabasta.
- Farafra (ファラフラ, Farafura): A member of the Rebel Army with a hippopotamus-like face. When protecting Koza, Farafra lost parts of his right arm, which were replaced with a prosthetic. Farafra is voiced by J. Paul Slavins in episode 105 in the Funimation dub and by Tyler Walker in episodes 120-121 of the Funimation dub.
- Okame (おかめ, Okame): A skinny woman who is a member of the Rebel Army.
- Kebi (ケビ, Kebi): A member of the Rebel Army who is fairly proficient in wielding a sword and a shotgun. Kebi is voiced by Joel McDonald in the Funimation dub and by Ian Sinclair in One Piece Movie: The Desert Princess and the Pirates: Adventures in Alabasta.

===== Super Spot-Billed Duck Troops =====
The Super Spot-Billed Duck Troops (超カルガモ部隊, Chō Karugamo Butai) are a group of Super Spot-Billed Ducks who are led by Karoo and loyal to the Alabasta royal family. They aid the Straw Hat Crew in dealing with Baroque Works and later assist the Straw Hat Crew in returning to the Going Merry undetected.

- Stomp (ストンプ, Sutonpu) is a Super Spot-Billed Duck who wears a reverse cap.
- Ivan X (イワンX, Iwan Ekkusu) is a Super Spot-Billed Duck who wears a horned helmet.
- Cowboy (カウボーイ, Kaubōi) is a Super Spot-Billed Duck who wears glasses and a cowboy hat.
- Bourbon Jr. (バーボンJr., Bābon Junia) is a Super Spot-Billed Duck who wears a hat.
- Kentaros (ケンタロウス, Kentarousu) is a Super Spot-Billed Duck who wears a Roman Legion helmet.
- Hikoichi (ヒコイチ, Hikoichi) is a Super Spot-Billed Duck who wears an Asian conical hat.

===== Other Alabasta Kingdom inhabitants =====
Other inhabitants include:

- Toh-Toh (トト, Toto): The father of Koza who lives in Yuba. When drought struck the kingdom, he dedicated himself to digging for water. Toh-Toh is voiced by Masaaki Tsukada in the original Japanese version. In the 4Kids dub, he is voiced by Sean Schemmel. In the Funimation dub, Toh-Toh is voiced by Jerry Russell is most appearances and by Gregory Lush in Episode 777. In the live-action series, where his name is spelled as Toto, he will be portrayed by Omid Abtahi.
- Aswa (アスワ, Asuwa): The mother of Koza who lives in Yuba. Aswa is voiced by Yui Horie in the original Japanese version and by Maeghan Albach in the Funimation dub.
- Eyelashes (マツゲ, Matsuge): A Yasa camel who accompanies the protagonists during their journey through the kingdom. He is also an honorary member of the Super Spot-Billed Duck Troops. Eyelashes's vocal effects are provided by Kappei Yamaguchi in the original Japanese version. In the 4Kids dub, his vocal effects are provided by Jamie McGonnigal. In the Funimation dub, Eyelashes' vocal effects are provided by Mike McFarland while Troy Baker provides Eyelashes' vocal effects in One Piece Movie: The Desert Princess and the Pirates: Adventures in Alabasta.

There are also several anime-exclusive inhabitants:

- Scorpion (スコーピオン, Sukōpion): A retired bounty hunter who resides in the Badland area of Alabasta. In his bounty hunter work, Scorpion wielded different weapons and gear, such as his Prescorraci Rifle. Scorpion is voiced by Jūrōta Kosugi in the original Japanese version and by Kent Williams in the Funimation dub.
- Chip and Dip (チップ, ディップ, Chippu, Deippu): The sons of Scorpion. They were present in their father's hunt for Portgas D. Ace and were saved from a landslide by Ace. Chip and Dip are voiced by Tomoko Kaneda and Haruhi Terada in the original Japanese version respectively. In the 4Kids dub, they are voiced by Matthew Nichols and Michael Sinterniklaas respectively. In the Funimation dub, Chip and Dip are voiced by Kate Oxley and Sean Michael Teague respectively.
- The Barbar Pirates are also residents of the kingdom.

==== Lulusia Kingdom ====
Lulusia Kingdom was a kingdom in Paradise. King Seki ruled over the kingdom before it fell in the Eight-Nation Revolution with help from the Revolutionary Army. Portgas D. Ace and Sabo both traveled here. The World Government ordered its complete destruction and erasure from history.^{[ch. 1060]}

Former inhabitants include:

- Moda (モーダ, Mōda): A girl involved in the milk business whose parents Kyuji and Koda work for the Marines as cooks. She escaped Lulusia with Sabo and joined the Revolutionary Army. She is voiced by Satomi Satō in the original Japanese version, and by Marisa Duran in the Funimation dub.
- Seki (セキ): A cruel king who looks like a vampire. He was killed by the World Government when Lulusia was destroyed. He is voiced by Masaya Takatsuka in the original Japanese version, and by Philip Weber in the Funimation dub. In the live-action series, Seki is portrayed by Rob van Vuuren.
- Comane (コマネ, Komane): A princess and daughter of Seki. She was killed by the World Government when Lulusia was destroyed. She is voiced by Ai Sasaki in the original Japanese version, and by Molly Searcy in the Funimation dub.
- Dr. Blackbeard (クロツル, Kurotsuru): A man who Ace mistook for Blackbeard during the "Ace's Great Search for Blackbeard" cover story.

==== Long Ring Long Land ====
Tonjit is an old man who comes from a nomadic nation traveling yearly between the different parts of Long Ring Long Land, which is a ring of islands connected underwater.^{[ch. 304]} The Straw Hats befriend Tonjit and his horse Sherry, who is shot by Foxy leading to the Foxy Pirates clashing with the Straw Hats in a Davy Back Fight.^{[ch. 305]}

==== Water 7 ====
Water 7 (水の都ウォーターセブン, Mizu no Miyako Wōtā Sebun; lit. "City of Water, Water Seven") is a city with water-ways and canals that are used for transportation almost like roads, often surrounded by sidewalks on the canals. Said canals around the city take inspiration by Venice, Italy.

There is Galley-La Company, the company with the best carpenters in the world, including:

- Iceburg (アイスバーグ, Aisubāgu): The city's mayor who is also the president and founder of Galley-La Company. He also was along with Franky an apprentice at Tom's Workers. Iceburg is voiced by Izō Oikawa as an adult in the original Japanese version, Daisuke Kishio as a young man in the original Japanese version, Philip Weber as an adult in the Funimation dub, and Austin Tindle as a young man in the Funimation dub.
- Paulie (パウリー, Paurī): The company's vice president. Paulie is voiced by Takahiro Yoshimizu in the original Japanese version and by David Wald in the Funimation dub (except in the video game One Piece: Unlimited Adventure, where he is voiced by Andrew Chandler).
- Peeply Lulu (ピープリー・ルル, Pīpurī Ruru): A man with a hair on his head that constantly changes position. Peeply Lulu is voiced by Shinichiro Ohta in the original Japanese version and by Martin Cervantes in the Funimation dub.
- Tileston (タイルストン, Tairusuton): A big, muscular man. Tilestone is voiced by Tetsu Inada in the original Japanese version and by Patrick Camacho in the Funimation dub.

In the city, there is also the Franky Family which was led by Franky before joining the Straw Hat Crew. The group include:

- Zambai (ザンバイ, Zanbai): Franky's right-hand man. Zambai is voiced by Kenta Miyake in the original Japanese version (except in Pirates' Carnival, where he is voiced by Tetsu Inada) and by Doug Goodrich in the Funimation dub.
- Mozu (モズ) and Kiwi (キウイ, Kiui): Two twin sisters who often accompanied Franky. Mozu is voiced by Miki Fukui and Aiko Hibi in the original Japanese version and by Morgan Garrett in the Funimation dub. Kiwi is voiced by Yuka Shioyama in the original Japanese version and Martha Harms in the Funimation dub.

Near to the city is the sea train station, whose workers include:

- Kokoro (ココロ), an elderly icefish-type mermaid who works at the train station, and former employee at Tom's Workers. Kokoro is voiced by Ako Mayama in the original Japanese version and by Juli Erickson in the Funimation dub.
- Chimney (チムニー, Chimunī): Kokoro's granddaughter, who is 1/4 mermaid. Chimney is voiced by Chiwa Saitō in the original Japanese version and by Lara Woodhull in the Funimation dub.
- Gonbe (ゴンベ): Chimney's pet rabbit. Gonbe's vocal effects are provided by Akemi Okamura in the original Japanese version and by Michelle Rojas in the Funimation dub.

Other known citizens include:

- Tom (トム, Tomu): A longhorn cowfish-type fish-man, was the leader at the carpentry company Tom's Workers, and Iceburg and Franky's master in their youth. He built the Roger Pirates' ship, and the Sea Train connecting Water 7 to other islands. Tom is voiced by Yasuo Muramatsu in the original Japanese version, Hiroaki Ishikawa in Episode 967 of the original Japanese version, and Rob Mungle in the Funimation dub.
- Yokozuna (ヨコヅナ): A giant frog, was part of Tom's Workers. After the government took Tom away, he spent years crashing into the sea train. Yokozuna's vocal effects are provided by Masaya Takatsuka in the original Japanese version and by Mike McFarland in the Funimation dub.
- Michael (マイケル, Maikeru) and Hoichael (ホイケル, Hoikeru): Two boys who are known as a duo of troublemakers in the city.^{[ch. 366]} While in the manga they only gave a brief appearance where attempted to mug Zoro but were easily beaten by him,^{[ch. 432]} in the anime they later have a more relevant role, where days later they ask Zoro to be their older brother, they being part of the orphaned children who Auntie cares for in the city.

Several CP9 members also lived undercover in the city.

There are also several anime-exclusive inhabitants:

- Abi (アビ): A young girl whom Luffy and Chopper helped find her family pet Aobire.
- Auntie (ババ, Baba): The owner of an orphanage, where she has several adoptive children.
- Banban (バンバン): An old man who works as the chef of a mobile restaurant. He is a childhood friend of Zeff.

==== Sabaody Archipelago ====
Sabaody Archipelago (シャボンディ諸島, Shabondi Shotō) is the final destination in Paradise, close to the Red Line. Silvers Rayleigh and Shakuyaku reside here after retiring from piracy.

Other inhabitants and people from the surrounding area include:

- Disco (ディスコ, Disuko): The head of the Auction House, a subordinate of the Donquixote Pirates, who ran it by auctioning slaves, until his business was ruined after the incident caused by Luffy. Because of this, on the island there are usually kidnappers for the slave trade. Disco is voiced by Yasunori Masutani in the original Japanese version and by Michael Sinterniklaas in the Funimation dub.
- Rosy Life Riders (人生バラ色ライダーズ, Jinsei Bara-iro Raidāzu): Formerly known as Flying Fish Riders (トビウオライダーズ, Tobiuo Raidāzu), are a notable kidnapping gang in the area.
  - Duval (デュバル, Dyubaru): The leader of the Rosy Life Riders, who looked exactly like a poorly drawn Sanji on his first bounty poster and had his reputation shattered. A meeting with the latter ended up rearranging his facial structure and making him a handsome man, after which he decided to swear allegiance to the Straw Hat Crew. Duval is voiced by Toshihiko Seki in the original Japanese version and by David Vincent in the Funimation dub.
  - Motobaro (モトバロ): A large bison with a motorcycle handlebar on its back, which Duval uses as a mode of transportation.

==== Amazon Lily ====
Amazon Lily (アマゾン・リリー, Amazon Rirī) is an island where men are forbidden,^{[ch. 514f., 535]} and the home of the Kuja Tribe (九蛇), a tribe of women. They are ruled by the Empress Boa Hancock.

The island's structure, whose houses are built into the walls of a mountain, takes its inspiration from the Hanging Temple, in China, while the name of the island, as well as the Kuja Tribe, are based on the Amazons in Greek mythology.

Outside the members of the Kuja Pirates, the islanders include:

- Kikyo (キキョウ, Kikyō): A Kuja warrior who has high leadership when Empress Boa Hancock is off the island. She tried to kill Luffy due to the ban on men on the island, but changed her mind when he won the tribe's affection. Kikyo is voiced by Yuriko Yamaguchi in the original Japanese version and by Rachel Robinson in the Funimation dub.
- Belladonna (ベラドンナ, Beradonna): A doctor at Amazon Lily. Belladonna is voiced by Tomoko Naka in the original Japanese version and by Dana Schultz in the Funimation dub.
- Genista (エニシダ, Enishida): One of Boa Hancock's attendants in her castle, where she works as a lady's maid. Genista is voiced by Ikue Ōtani in the original Japanese version and by Mallorie Rodak in the Funimation dub.
- Nerine (ネリネ, Nerine): A member of the Kuja who after Luffy's arrival on Amazon Lily, writes down in a notebook everything she discovers about men through him. Although many things are not precise. Nerine is voiced by Aiko Hibi in the original Japanese version and by Michelle Rojas in the Funimation dub.
- Poppy (ポピー, Popī): A warrior of the Kuja with bandaged arms and is always barefoot. She is shown to know Haki, but is weaker than Pansy. Poppy is voiced by Hiromi Nishikawa in the original Japanese version and by Michelle Lee in the Funimation dub.
- Pansy (パンジー, Panjī): A large overweight warrior of the Kuja who wears a top that reveals all but her stomach area, a matching skirt, and is always barefoot. Pansy is voiced by Chigusa Ikeda in the original Japanese version and by Dawn M. Bennett in the Funimation dub.

==== Bowin Islands ====
- Heracles (ヘラクレス, Herakuresu): A warrior and botanist who resides at the Bowin Islands, also known as the Boin Archipelago.^{[ch. 524]} He wears armor shaped like a Hercules beetle. During the two years of the series' time skip, he trained Usopp in the use of Pop Greens.^{[ch. 598]} In the anime he is voiced by Rintarō Nishi in the original Japanese version, and by David Wilson-Brown in the Funimation dub.

=== Sky Islands ===
==== Skypiea ====
Skypiea

Skypiea (スカイピア, Sukaipia) is a land located in the skies of the Paradise half of the Grand Line, consisting of Angel Island (エンジェル島, Enjeru Tō), one of several solid clouds, and Upper Yard, a lost part of the Grand Line island Jaya, believed by most on the Blue Sea to have never existed while a minority believes it sunk into the ocean. The Shandorians are the original inhabitants of Jaya until the part of the island where they lived ascended to Skypiea via the Knock-Up Stream 400 years ago. At that time Sky Islanders were already living on Angel Island, and conquered the newly ascended Island which they called Upper Yard. Six years before the story, Eneru overthrows Gan Fall to become the "God" ruling the islands. The Straw Hats overthrow Eneru and drove him off the island.

===== Gan Fall =====
Gan Fall (ガン・フォール, Gan Fōru) is the previous King of Skypiea before being overthrown by Eneru. He has aided the Straw Hat Crew, saving them from different dangers. After Eneru was defeated, Gan Fall accepted the people of Skypiea's request to rule them again. With the exception of Gan Fall, most of the inhabitants of Skypiea are shown to have bird-like wings on their backs even though none of them have been able to fly on their own.

Gan Fall is voiced by Jōji Yanami in the original Japanese version, Ichikawa Ennosuke IV in the original Japanese version of Episode of Sky Island, Masaharu Satō in Episode 967 of the original Japanese version, and John Swasey in the Funimation dub.

- Pierre (ピエール, Piēru) is Gan Fall's pet Sky Dot Bird who serves as his mode of transportation. He can transform into a horse or a winged horse-like form after eating the Horse-Horse Fruit. Pierre's vocal effects are provided by Kazuya Nakai in the original Japanese version and by Z. Charles Bolton in the Funimation dub.

===== God's Army =====
God's Army (神の軍団, Kami no Gundan) is the personal army of Eneru, consisting of himself, the God's Priests, and the fifty Enforcers.^{[ch. 246, 254, 257]} In combat, the Priests and Enforcers rely heavily on various types of dials. Eneru and the Priests are also skilled users of the Color of Observation Haki, which they refer to as Mantra (マントラ, Mantora).^{[ch. 257, 597]} With the exception of Eneru, most of its members are remnants of the sky island of Birka. Upon Eneru being defeated, most of his followers were either banished through Cloud Drifting or returned to working under Gan Fall.

====== Eneru ======
Eneru (エネル) (Note: Also called Enel in some media.) was the "God" of Skypiea. He originates from Birka before destroying it, arriving at Skypiea, and annexing the region from Gan Fall. Though "God" is traditionally the title only for the island's ruler, he takes it literally, forcing the population to worship and serve him.^{[ch. 254f., 274]} The Logia-type Rumble-Rumble Fruit (ゴロゴロの実, Goro Goro no Mi) grants him the ability to manipulate, generate, and transform into electricity.^{[ch. 266]} He can also use Observation Haki, called Mantra (マントラ, Mantora) on Skypiea.^{[ch. 257, 597]} Used in conjunction, these abilities extend his hearing over the entire country and allow him to immediately punish those who speak up against him.^{[ch. 278]} Eneru's overly long earlobes reach down to his chest, similar to some depictions of Buddha, and like the god of thunder and storms, Raijin, he wears a ring of drums, showing a tomoe on the drumhead, on his back.^{[ch. 254]} After his defeat at the hands of Luffy, Eneru pilots his ship the Ark Maxim into outer space and lands on the Moon where he discovers his ancestry, including Skypieans, Shandians, and Birkans, to have originated from the natural satellite.

Eneru is voiced by Toshiyuki Morikawa in the original Japanese version, Wayne Grayson in the 4Kids English dub, and J. Michael Tatum in the Funimation English dub.

====== God's Priests ======
God's Priests (神官, Shinkan) are the elite minions of Eneru who use their own ordeals to punish criminals and trespassers to Skypiea. All except Gedatsu were banished through Cloud Drifting.

- Satori (サトリ): A Birkan and member of the God's Priests who uses the Ordeal of Balls. Satori is voiced by Yasuhiro Takato in the original Japanese version and by David Lapkin and Chris Cason in the 4Kids and Funimation dubs respectively.
- Gedatsu (ゲダツ): A Birkan and member of the God's Priests who uses the Ordeal of Swamp. He is depicted as a comically strong yet idiotic figure who routinely forgets bodily functions such as seeing and breathing. After being defeated by Tony Tony Chopper, Gedatsu accidentally fell from Skypiea and assists in the construction of a hot spring resort near Alabasta, unintentionally turning over a new leaf. Gedatsu is voiced by Masaya Takatsuka in the original Japanese version and by Bob Carter in the original Japanese version.
- Shura (シュラ): A Birkan and member of the God's Priests who uses the Ordeal of String. Shura is voiced by Shinichiro Ohta in the original Japanese version and by Dan Green and Kent Williams in the 4Kids and Funimations dubs respectively.
  - Fuza (フザ): A Three-Length Bird (a giant bird species from Skypiea) who accompanies Shura. He can breathe fire due to eating a Flame Dial.^{[ch. 248]}
- Ohm (オーム, Ōmu): A Birkan and member of the God's Priests who uses the Ordeal of Iron. Ohm is voiced by Eiji Takemoto in the original Japanese version, by Scottie Ray in the 4Kids dub, he is voiced, and by Troy Baker in the Funimation dub (except for Episode of Skypiea, where he is voiced by Patrick McAlister).
  - Holy (ホーリー, Hōrī): A giant dog who accompanies Ohm. He is able to stand up to fight by throwing punches.^{[ch. 268]}

====== Enforcers ======
There are 50 Enforcers (神兵, Shinpei) (Note: Referred to as Heavenly Warriors in the Viz Media translation of the manga and as Divine Warriors in the Funimation English dub of the anime.) who fight in the name of Eneru.

- Yama (ヤマ): Commander of the Enforcers. He has an encounter with Nico Robin, who ends up defeating him. Yama is voiced by Hidenari Ugaki in the original Japanese version and by Andrew Chandler in the Funimation dub.
- Hotori (ホトリ) and Kotori (コトリ): Satori's younger brothers, and lieutenants of the Enforcers. Both are voiced by Yasuhiro Takato in the original Japanese version and by Chris Cason in the Funimation dub.

===== Shandorians =====
- Wyper (ワイパー, Waipā): A proud warrior and leader of the Shandorians who is initially distrustful of outsiders.^{[ch. 249]} He is a descendant of the warrior and hero Kalgara (カルガラ, Karugara).^{[ch. 249]}^{[ch. 286]} Wyper is voiced by Masaki Aizawa as an adult in the original Japanese version, Reiko Kiuchi as a young man in the original Japanese version, J. Paul Slavens as an adult in the Funimation dub, and Leah Clark as a young man in the Funimation dub.
- Aisa (アイサ): A young girl who likes to collect soil from Skypiea's Upper Yard,^{[ch. 249]} and with a highly developed Mantra (Observation Haki).^{[ch. 264,265]} Aisa is voiced by Masami Suzuki in the original Japanese version and by Cherami Leigh in the Funimation dub.
- Raki (ラキ): A Shandorian warrior woman who is especially close with Aisa. Raki is voiced by Michie Tomizawa in the original Japanese version and by Lydia Mackay in the Funimation dub.
- Nola (ノラ, Nora): A giant snake who raised by the Shandorian warrior Kalgara 400 years ago. Nola's vocal effects are provided by Masaya Takatsuka in the original Japanese version. In the Funimation dub, its vocal effects are provided by Kyle Hebert in episodes 168–176, Peter Hawekinson in 177–187, Christopher Bevins starting in Episode 188, and Jim Foronda in Episode of Skypiea.

===== Angel Island =====
- Amazon (アマゾン, Amazon): A short elderly inhabitant of Skypiea who serves as the gatekeeper to Angel Island. Anyone wanting to enter Skypiea can either pay the toll or not pay it and enter at their own risk. Sometime after the timeskip, Amazon took up a new job being the ticket saleswoman for Skypiea's theme park Wagumoland. Amazon is voiced by Keiko Yamamoto in the original Japanese version and by Juli Erickson in the Funimation dub.
- Conis (コニス, Konisu) is a citizen of Angel Island and Pagaya's daughter. She befriends Straw Hat Crew after their arrival at Skypiea.^{[ch. 239]} After the time skip, she works as a waitress at the Pumpkin Café. Conis is voiced by Rieko Takahasi in the original Japanese version and by Laura Bailey in the Funimation dub (except for Episode of Skypiea, where she is voiced by Jill Harris).
- Pagaya (パガヤ): An engineer of Angel Island and Conis' father.^{[ch. 239]} Pagaya is voiced by Mahito Ōba in the original Japanese version and by Grant James in the Funimation dub.
- Suu (スー, Sū): A "cloud fox" who is Conis' pet.^{[ch. 239]} Su's vocal effects are provided by Akemi Okamura in the original Japanese version and by Majken Bullard in the Funimation dub (except in Episode of Skypiea where Suu's vocal effects are provided by Bryn Aprill).

==== Weatheria ====
Weatheria is a Sky Island located over Paradise run by climatologists.

- Haredas: A Sky Islander originally from Birka. Nami trained for two years under his guardianship.

=== Fish-Man Island ===
Lying on the ocean floor halfway through the Red Line part of the Grand Line, Fish-Man Island is inhabited primarily by Fish-men (魚人, gyojin) and Merfolk (人魚, ningyo).^{[ch. 69]} The average fish-man has ten times the strength of a human, can breathe underwater, and swim fast.^{[ch. 70f., 495]} It is also the island where Jimbei come from.

On the Fish-Man Island is the Ryugu Kingdom (リュウグウ王国, Ryūgū Ōkoku), ruled by the Neptune family. Several members of some pirate crews, including the Sun Pirates, the Arlong Pirates, the Macro Pirates, the Flying Pirates, and the New Fish-Man Pirates, come from Fish-Man Island.

==== Neptune family ====
- Neptune (ネプチューン, Nepuchūn): A coelacanth-type merman and the King of the Ryugu Kingdom. Neptune is voiced by Minoru Inaba in the original Japanese version and by Bruce DuBose in the Funimation dub. The character is named after the god of the Roman mythology Neptune.
- Otohime (オトヒメ, Otohime): A goldfish-type mermaid who was Neptune's wife and the Queen of the Ryugu Kingdom before her assassination. Otohime is voiced by Michiko Neya in the original Japanese version and by AmaLee in the Funimation dub.
- Fukaboshi (フカボシ, Fukaboshi): A shark-type merman who is one of the three princes of the Ryugu Kingdom and the eldest son of Neptune and Otohime. Fukaboshi is voiced by Kentarō Itō in the original Japanese version and by Jarrod Greene in the Funimation dub.
- Ryuboshi (リュウボシ, Ryūboshi): An oarfish-type merman who is one of the three princes of the Ryugu Kingdom and the middle son of Neptune and Otohime. Ryuboshi is voiced by Yūsuke Numata in the original Japanese version and by Alex Ross in the Funimation dub.
- Manboshi (マンボシ, Manboshi): An opah-type merman who is one of the three princes of the Ryugu Kingdom and the youngest son of Neptune and Otohime. Manboshi is voiced by Kazanari Tanaka and Yasuhiro Mamiya in the original Japanese version and by Troy Hughes in the Funimation dub.
- Shirahoshi (しらほし, Shirahoshi): A smelt-witing-type mermaid who is the princess of the Ryugu Kingdom and the youngest child of Neptune and Otohime. She became good friends with Luffy when she met him. She is able to communicate with Sea Kings and as such is the Ancient Weapon Poseidon, giving her the power to destroy the world. Shirahoshi is voiced by Yukana in the original Japanese version and by Bryn Apprill in the Funimation dub.

==== Ryugu Kingdom citizens ====
- Camie (ケイミー, Keimī): A kissing gourami-type mermaid who is friends with the Straw Hat Crew and Hatchan. She works at the Mermaid Café. Camie is voiced by Haruna Ikezawa in the original Japanese version and by Megan Shipman in the Funimation dub.
- Pappagu (パッパグ, Pappagu): A talking starfish who is Camie's pet and a famous fashion designer. Pappagu is voiced by Kōzō Shioya in the original Japanese version and by Chris Cason in the Funimation dub.
- Shyarly (シャーリー, Shārī): A shortfin mako shark-type mermaid, proprietor of the Mermaid Café and fortune-teller capable of seeing the future and Arlong's younger sister. Shyarly is voiced by Romi Park in the original Japanese version and by Morgan Berry in the Funimation dub.

=== New World, Grand Line ===
The New World is the second half of the Grand Line.

==== Punk Hazard ====
Punk Hazard (パンクハザード島, Panku Hazādo-tō) is an island which is half hot and half cold, because Sakazuki and Kuzan fought there for the post of fleet admiral. Dr. Vegapunk once had a laboratory here. It was also where Kaido and King were held prisoner and used as guinea pigs for the experiments there.

The island's climate was inspired by Iceland.

===== Caesar Clown =====
Caesar Clown (シーザー・クラウン, Shīzā Kuraun) is a psychopathic former Marine scientist capable of transforming into gas due to the Logia-type Gas-Gas Fruit (ガスガスの実, Gasu Gasu no Mi).^{[ch. 668]} He is a former member of MADS and a leading expert on chemical weapons of mass destruction. He works for Donquixote Doflamingo creating artificial Devil Fruits called SMILEs, and using kidnapped children in Punk Hazard for his experiments. He is also a direct subordinate of the Donquixote Pirates. After his defeat at the hands of Monkey D. Luffy, he is taken to Dressrosa by the Straw Hat Crew and Trafalgar Law as a prisoner to make a hostage swap with Doflamingo. Despite his antagonistic relationship with the Straw Hats, he cooperates with Chopper in medicine production and assists in improving his Rumble Balls.^{[ch. 1014]} After his escape, he cooperates with former MADS colleague Vinsmoke Judge to form NEO MADS in order to surpass Vegapunk only to be dismayed by the news of Vegapunk's death on Egghead.^{[ch. 1078,1113]}

===== Punk Hazard staff =====
Most of Caesar Clown's henchmen working in Punk Hazard have aspects of mythological creatures like centaurs and satyrs, because Trafalgar Law gave them animal parts to replace their wrecked legs; these include Monet and Brownbeard.

Other inhabitants include:

- The Yeti Cool Brothers (イエティ・クール・ブラザーズ, Ieti Kūru Burazāzu): They consist of Rock (ロック, Rokku) and Scotch (スコッチ, Sukotchi), two 139 ft. assassin brothers from the world's criminal underworld who are from a mysterious race of white-furred giants. Their heads are always in the shadows. The Yeti Cool Brothers work for Caesar Clown as his guards.^{[ch. 666]} Rock was defeated by Franky and Scotch was bisected by Trafalgar Law.^{[ch. 667]} It is unknown what happened to them afterwards. Rock is voiced by Hiroyuki Kinoshita in the original Japanese version and by Lee Steinfeld in the Funimation dub. Scotch is voiced by Shunsuke Sakuya in the original Japanese version and by Newton Pittman in the Funimation dub.
- Smiley (スマイリー, Sumairī): Caesar Clown's pet. A 492 ft. poisonous gas who "ate" the Sala-Sala Fruit: Model Axolotl that enables it to become an axolotl and an axolotl-poisonous gas hybrid.^{[ch. 673]} He was killed when he consumed one of the candies that Caesar Clown fed him that was tainted enough to cause him to revert to his original gaseous form with a nearby fruit becoming the new Sala-Sala Fruit: Model Axolotl. Smiley's vocal effects are provided by Newton Pittman in the Funimation dub.
- Dragon Number Thirteen (ドラゴン十三號, Doragon Jūsan-gō): An artificial dragon who was created by Dr. Vegapunk and guards one of his laboratories. He was attacked by Kin'emon's legs and later killed by Roronoa Zoro.^{[ch. 656]}

===== Guinea pig children =====
Caesar Clown captured children to serve as his guinea pigs in his experiments. Most of them were made into artificial giants through Caesar's experiments with gigantification and kept in the Biscuit Room. Following Caesar's defeat at the hands of the Straw Hat Crew, Smoker and Tashigi took the children into their custody and arranged for them to be treated by Dr. Vegapunk near Egghead. Among they are:

- Mocha (モチャ, Mocha): A little girl who was subjected to gigantification. Mocha is voiced by Akemi Kanda in the original Japanese version and by Jennifer Alyx in the Funimation dub.
- Sind (シンド, Shindo): A little boy who was subjected to gigantification. Sind is voiced by Naoko Matsui in the original Japanese version and by Ryan Reynolds in the Funimation dub.
- Doran (ドラン, Doran): A little boy who was subjected to gigantification. Doran is voiced by Aiko Hibi in the original Japanese version and by Madeleine Morris in the Funimation dub.
- Ally (アリー, Ari): A is a little girl who was subjected to gigantification. Ally is voiced by Shiori Mikami in the original Japanese version and by Kristen McGuire in the Funimation dub.
- Konbu (コンブ, Konbu): A is a little boy who was subjected to gigantification. Konbu is voiced by Hiroko Ushida in the original Japanese version and by Amanda Gish in the Funimation dub.
- Uzu (ウズ, Uzu): A little boy who was subjected to gigantification. Uzu is voiced by Kumiko Nishihara in the original Japanese version and by Terri Doty in the Funimation dub.
- Biyo (ビヨ, Biyo): A little boy who was subjected to gigantification. Biyo is voiced by Machiko Kawana in the original Japanese version and by Kate Oxley in the Funimation dub.
- Ginko (ギンコ, Ginko): A little girl who was not subjected to gigantification due to her relatively recent arrival. Ginko is voiced by Mai Aizawa in the original Japanese version and by Dusty Freeman in the Funimation dub.
- Kozuki Momonosuke was not subject to gigantification, but ate an Artificial Devil Fruit left on the site.

==== Dressrosa ====
Dressrosa (ドレスローザ, Doresurōza) is a kingdom within the New World.

The island's culture is primarily inspired by Spain, with its architecture mainly based on Park Güell.

===== Riku family =====
Dressrosa is ruled by the Riku Family (リク一族, Riku Ichizoku),^{[ch. 722]} which include:

- Riku Dold III (リク・ドルド3世, Riku Dorudo Sansei): He was the King of Dressrosa until Donquixote Doflamingo stages a mutiny and dethrones him. Riku remains a vital figure amongst the resistance until Luffy defeats Doflamingo, allowing Riku to reclaim the throne. Riku Dold is voiced by Masashi Hirose in earlier episodes of the original Japanese version, Banjō Ginga starting in Episode 666 of the original Japanese version, and by Mark Oristano in the Funimation dub.
- Scarlett (スカーレット, Sukāretto): The older daughter of Riku Dold III and the first princess of Dressrosa who was killed by Diamante the day when the Donquixote Pirates took over Dressrosa. She was previously declared dead for deciding to marry the criminal Kyros, living with him and siring Rebecca. Scarlett is voiced by Wakana Yamazaki in the original Japanese version and by Gloria Benavides in the Funimation dub.
- Viola (ヴィオラ, Viora): The former second princess of Dressrosa. When the Donquixote Pirates took over Dressrosa, Viola joined them to prevent Donquixote Doflamingo from killing her father working under the name of "Violet" (ヴァイオレット, Vaioretto) as an assassin and officer of the Trébol Army until betraying the crew.^{[ch. 703, 712]} After Doflamingo's defeat, Viola becomes the crown princess of Dressrosa after her niece Rebecca abdicated her position.^{[ch. 797]} The Glare-Glare Fruit (ギロギロの実, Giro Giro no Mi) she ate gives her the ability to see through everything, even other people's minds, allowing her to read thoughts.^{[ch. 712]} Viola is voiced by Mie Sonozaki in the original Japanese version and by Cristina Vee in the Funimation dub.
- Kyros (キュロス, Kyurosu): The father of Rebecca and husband of Scarlett. A criminal at youth, he became a successful gladiator and later married Scarlett. Initially refusing to touch Rebecca with his bare hands because of his past, he was turned into a toy soldier by Sugar after Scarlett's death and raised Rebecca to adulthood without revealing his identity. He led a resistance with the Tontatta Kingdom until Luffy's interference defeated Doflamingo. Kyros is voiced by Rikiya Koyama in the original Japanese version and by Ivan Jasso in the Funimation dub.
- Rebecca (レベッカ, Rebekka): The daughter of Scarlett and Kyros and the granddaughter of Riku Dold III. She was raised by a toy soldier to adulthood, who unbeknownst to her is a transformed Kyros. She is a gladiator known for being undefeated despite her stature, manipulating the Corrida Colosseum's borders to her favor and her strong Observation Haki enabling her to dodge most attacks. Her kindness to a disguised Monkey D. Luffy would become the catalyst to Doflamingo's defeat. Rebecca is voiced by Megumi Hayashibara in the original Japanese version and by Christine Marie Cabanos in the Funimation dub.

===== Corrida Colosseum gladiators =====
The Corrida Colosseum is a place in Dressrosa based on the real life Colosseum in Rome, Italy.

Besides Luffy, Riku Dold III, Bellamy, Sabo, members of the Donquixote Pirates, members of the Marines, and members of those pirate crews that would later become part of the Straw Hat Grand Fleet, the following characters participated in a tournament for the prize of the Flare-Flare Fruit in Corrida Colosseum as gladiators:

- Tank Lepanto (タンク・レパント, Tanku Repanto): The former commander of Dressrosa's Self-Defense Army. Tank Lepanto is voiced by Keikō Sakai in the original Japanese version and by Aaron Michael in the Funimation dub.
- Kelly Funk (ケリー・ファンク, Kerī Fanku): An assassin from Mogaro Kingdom who ate the Jacket-Jacket Fruit, which enables him to transform into a jacket and control whoever wears him. Kelly Funk is voiced by Masami Kikuchi in the original Japanese version and by Daman Mills in the Funimation dub.
- Bobby Funk (ボビー・ファンク, Bobī Fanku): An assassin from Mogaro Kingdom who is the younger brother of Kelly Funk. Bobby Funk is voiced by Kenji Nomura in the original Japanese version and by Mark Allen Jr. in the Funimation dub.
- Jean Ango (ジャン・アンゴ, Jan Ango): A bounty hunter who wears a cactus-themed sombrero. Jean Ango is voiced by Yasuhiro Mamiya in the original Japanese version and by Mark Fickert in the Funimation dub.
- Ucy (ウーシー, Ūshī): A fighting bull whose left horn was broken in a fight with Hajrudin. Ucy's vocal effects were provided by Kōji Haramaki in the original Japanese version and by Chris Thurman in the English dub of Episode of Sabo.
- Mummy (マミー, Mamī): A sorcerer who partook in the tournament for the Flare-Flare Fruit. Mummy is voiced by Masaya Takatsuka in the original Japanese version and by Oscar Seung in the Funimation dub.
- Meadows (メドウズ, Medōzu): A man in an unspecified feline-skin cape. Meadows is voiced by Sōta Arai in the original Japanese version and by Alex Mai in the Funimation dub.
- Agyo (アギョウ, Agyō): A fighting white lion who partook in the tournament for the Flare-Flare Fruit. He was defeated by Orlumbus. Agyo's vocal effects were provided by Hiromi Miyazaki in the original Japanese version and by Travis Mullenix in the Funimation dub.
- Damask (ダマスク, Damasuku): A gas mask-wearing pyromaniac who partook in the tournament for the Flare-Flare Fruit. His gas mask contains a built-in flamethrower. Damask is voiced by Hiromi Miyazaki in the original Japanese version.
- Rolling Logan (ローリング・ローガン, Rōringu Rōgan): An army commander from Majiatsuka Kingdom. Rolling Logan is voiced by Taiten Kusunoki in the original Japanese version and by Koji Haramaki in episode 729 of the original Japanese version. In the Funimation dub, he is voiced by Brian Barber.
- Acilla (アキリア, Akiria): A large and bulky woman who partook in the tournament for the Flare-Flare Fruit. Acilla is voiced by Kimiko Saitō in the original Japanese version and by Wendy Powell in the Funimation dub.
- Gardoa (ガルドア, Garudoa): An anime-exclusive bounty hunter who partook in the tournament for the Flare-Flare Fruit. Gardoa is voiced by Tetsuya Kakihara in the original Japanese version and by Anthony Bowling in the Funimation dub.

===== Other Dressrosa inhabitants =====
- Gatz (ギャッツ, Gyattsu): The announcer at the Corrida Colosseum. Gatz is voiced by Taketora in the original Japanese version and by Michael Johnson in the Funimation dub.
- Esta (エスタ, Esuta): A civilian of Dressrosa. Esta is voiced by Yuka Saitō in the original Japanese version. In the Funimation dub, she is voiced by Jo Lorio in episode 642 and by Joanne Beatty in episode 677.
- Milo (ミロ, Miro): A chubby civilian of Dressrosa who was turned into a metallic toy dog by Sugar. He later regained his human form when Sugar was defeated and reunited with his wife and child. Milo is voiced by Yasunori Masutani in the original Japanese version and by Nazeeh Tarsha in the Funimation dub.
- Mario (マリオ, Mario): A brown dog from Dressrosa.
- Kyuin (キュイーン, Kyuīn): A very large vacuum cleaner-wielding woman. She is a former member of the Donquixote Pirates and oversaw the SMILE Factory that used enslaved Tontatta dwarves. Kyuin is voiced by Yūko Kobayashi in the original Japanese version and by Lauren Landa in the Funimation dub.

The members of the Donquixote Pirates also resided in Dressrosa during the period when Donquixote Doflamingo dethroned King Riku.

==== Green Bit ====
Green Bit (グリーンビット, Gurīn Bitto) is an island next to Dressrosa, and the home of the Tontatta Tribe (トンタッタ族, Tontatta-zoku), a group of dwarves living on Tontatta Kingdom, a little kingdom hidden in.

- King Gancho (ガンチョ): The "Tonta-Chief" of Tontatta Island. King Gancho is voiced by Kenichi Ogata in the original Japanese version and by R. Bruce Elliott in the Funimation dub.
- Mansherry (マンシェリー, Mansherī): Gancho's daughter and the tribe's princess who has the power of the Heal-Heal Fruit, which gives her the ability to instantly heal injuries with her tears. Mansherry is voiced by Ai Nonaka in the original Japanese version and by Dani Chambers in the Funimation dub.

The Tonta Corps, later the Tontatta Pirates, are the armed forces of the tribe.

==== Prodence Kingdom ====
Prodence Kingdom (プロデンス王国, Purodensu Ōkoku) is a kingdom located somewhere in the New World.

- Elizabello II (エリザベローII世, Elizabello II): The large muscular King of Prodence Kingdom. He partook in the tournament for the Flare-Flare Fruit at Dressrosa, where he was part of the B-Block fight and befriended Luffy. Elizabello is voiced by Katsumi Chō in the original Japanese version and by Andy Mullins in the Funimation dub.
- Dagama (ダガマ, Dagama): A large, chubby, and hunchbacked tactician of Prodence Kingdom. He partook in the tournament for the Flare-Flare Fruit at Dressrosa, where he was part of the B-Block fight and befriended Luffy. Dagama is voiced by Shirō Saitō in the original Japanese version and by Marc Swint in the Funimation dub.

==== Zou ====
Zou (ゾウ, Zō) is an island that is the home of the Mink Tribe (ミンク族, Minku Zoku), a tribe of anthropomorphic mammals. The Mink Tribe is loyal to the Kozuki Family from Wano Country as they shared unbreakable ancestral bonds. One red-colored Poneglyph belongs to the Mink Tribe, which proves to be useful in finding Raftel. The Mink Tribe's city, built on the back of Zou, is known as the Mokomo Dukedom. The Mokomo Dukedom is led by Dogstorm and Cat Viper.

Other members of the tribe include the Heart Pirates' navigator Bepo, the Big Mom Pirates' combatant Pekoms, and the Revolutionary Army commander Lindbergh.

===== Zunesha =====
Zunesha (象主) is a 35-kilometer (115,000 ft) Naitamie-Norida (Japanese for "Elephant resembling Dalí's painting" spelled backwards) Elephant who carries Zou as part of a punishment for an as-yet-unrevealed crime. He can only attack if someone with the "Voice of All Things" orders so as seen when it decimated the Animal Kingdom Pirates fleet led by Jack. Zunesha was a companion of Joy Boy.

Zunesha is voiced by Ben Hiura in the original Japanese version and by Reagan Murdock in the Funimation dub.

Zunesha's appearance is based on the real life Elephant Rock, in Iceland.

===== Dogstorm and Cat Viper =====
Dogstorm (イヌアラシ, Inuarashi) is a canine-type mink resembling an Inugami who leads the Mink Tribe from dawn to dusk. Cat Viper (ネコマムシ, Nekomamushi) is a wildcat-type mink with lion mane-like hair who lead the Mink Tribe from dusk to dawn. They are both part of the Akazaya Nine.

As children they came to Wano Country, where they became retrainers of Kozuki Oden, whom years later they accompanied on his journey at sea as crew members of the Whitebeard Pirates, and later as members of the Roger Pirates. When Oden died, they both blamed each other for failing to protect him, later returning to Zou, where at some point they became rulers, and harboring a grudge for years by avoiding seeing each other.

Due to an invasion of Zou by the Animal Kingdom Pirates led by Jack, Dogstorm lost half a leg, while Cat Viper lost half an arm. When the Straw Hat Crew and the Heart Pirates arrived in Zou, they formed an alliance with them and the Kozuki Clan to travel to Wano and end Kaido's tyranny. Dogstorm becomes the Daimyo of Kuri.

Dogstorm is voiced by Takaya Hosi in the original Japanese version and by Naomi Shindō as a young Mink in the original Japanese version. In the Funimation dub, he is voiced by Jeff Plunk as an adult and by Mary Morgan as a young mink.

Cat Viper is voiced by Masari Ikeda in the original Japanese version and by Arisa Sekine as a young Mink in the original Japanese version. In the Funimation dub, he is voiced by SungWon Cho as an adult and by Emi Lo as a young mink.

===== Carrot =====
Carrot (キャロット, Kyarotto) is a rabbit-type mink member of Dogstorm's Musketeers and a ruler's aide.^{[ch. 809]} Eager to travel around the world and see the seas, she infiltrates the Thousand Sunny as the Straw Hat Crew set out on their journey to Totto Land to rescue Sanji,^{[ch. 823]} and remains on with the crew during their trip to Wano Country.^{[ch. 903, 976]} Carrot is an extremely skilled fighter, possessing extraordinary agility and speed and, as a rabbit, is capable of jumping very high.^{[ch. 804]} In combat, she uses clawed gauntlets that Pedro, who was her trainer, gave her when she was younger.^{[ch. 888]} Like the other members of the Mink tribe, under the full moon Carrot transformed into a ferocious berserker with incredible speed, strength, the power to fly and lightning powers. After the events in the Wano Country, Dogstorm and Cat Viper propose to her to become the future ruler of the Minks.^{[ch. 1056]}

Carrot is voiced by Kanae Itō in the original Japanese version and by Tia Ballard in the Funimation dub.

===== Musketeers =====
Dogstorm's military forces are Dogstorm's Musketeers (犬嵐銃士隊, Inuarashi Jūshi-tai).

- Shishilian (シシリアン, Shishirian): A lion-type mink and the captain of Dogstorm's Musketeers.^{[ch. 808]} Shishilian is voiced by Eiji Hanawa in the original Japanese version and by Kellen Goff in the Funimation dub.
- Concelot (コンスロット, Konsurotto): A fox-type mink. Concelot is voiced by Toshiya Chiba in the earlier parts of the original Japanese version and by Yukinori Okuhata starting in episode 959 of the original Japanese version. In the Funimation dub, he is voiced by Adam Gibbs.
- Giovanni (ジョバンニ, Joban'ni): A zebra-type mink. Giovanni is voiced by Ryōhei Arai in the earlier parts of the original Japanese version and by Toshiya Chiba starting in episode 959 of the original Japanese version. In the Funimation dub, he is voiced by Lee George.
- Wanda (ワンダ, Wanda): A canine-type mink^{[ch. 805]} and a ruler's aide.^{[ch. 811]} Wanda is voiced by Fumiko Orikasa in the original Japanese version and by Jenny Yokobori in the Funimation dub.
- Yomo (ヨモ, Yomo): A sheep-type mink and pastor. Yomo is voiced by Kazunari Tanaka in the original Japanese version and by John Stimic in the Funimation dub.

===== Guardians =====
Cat Viper's military forces are the Guardians (ガーディアンズ, Gādianzu).

- Pedro (ペドロ, Pedoro): A jaguar-type mink who is the captain of the Guardians,^{[ch. 814]} former pirate captain of the Nox Pirates, and explorer.^{[ch. 849]} He accompanied the Straw Hat Crew on their journey to Totto Land,^{[ch. 822]} and ended up sacrificing himself to save them.^{[ch. 877]} Pedro is voiced by Shin-ichiro Miki in the original Japanese version and by Ben Balmaceda in the Funimation dub.
- Roddy (ロディ, Rodi): A cattle-type mink with bison-like hair going down his back who is the Guardian of the Whale Forest. Roddy is voiced by Yoshihisa Kawahara in the original Japanese version and by Ian Mead Moore in the Funimation dub.
- Blackback (ブラックバック, Burakkubakku) (aka "BB"): A gorilla-type mink with a moustache and afro who is the Guardian of the Whale Forest. Blackback is voiced by Kazunari Tanaka in episode 754-761 of the original Japanese version and by Sōta Arai starting in episode 765 of the original Japanese version. In the Funimation dub, he is voiced by Anthony Bowling.
- Keith (キース, Kīsu): A monkey-type mink who protects the Whale Forest's Mokomo Dukedom at night. Keith is voiced by Keiji Hirai in the original Japanese version.
- Milky (ミルキー, Mirukī): A reindeer-type mink who Tony Tony Chopper took a liking to. Milky is voiced by Yuka Saitō in the original Japanese version and by Morgan Garrett in the Funimation dub.

===== Other Zou inhabitants =====
- Bariete (バリエテ, Bariete): A small monkey-type mink who guards the gates of the Mokomo Dukedom who takes his job seriously. Bariete is voiced by Kappei Yamaguchi in the original Japanese version and by Jim Foronda in the Funimation dub.
- Tristan (トリスタン, Torisutan): A squirrel-type mink with blue hair who is one of the subjects of Dogstorm where she works as a nurse. Tristan is voiced by Ai Sasaki in the original Japanese version and by Felecia Angelle in the Funimation dub.
- Monjii (モンジイ, Monjii): An elderly monkey-type mink with a long beard. Monjii is voiced by Minoru Inaba in the original Japanese version and by Ben Phillips in the Funimation dub.
- Miyagi (ミヤギ, Miyagi): A goat-type mink who is one the subjects of Dogstorm where he works as a doctor. Miyagi is voiced by Tomomichi Nishimura in the original Japanese version and by Kenny James in the Funimation dub.
- Wany (ワーニー, Wānī): A crocodile-boar who serves as Wanda's mode of transportation. Wany's vocal effects are provided by Takahiro Fujimoto in the original Japanese version and by Belsheber Rusape Jr. in the Funimation dub.
- Zepo (ゼポ, Zepo): A polar bear-type mink who was part of the Nox Pirates with Pedro and Pekoms; he was the older brother of Bepo. After he and Pedro were captured by Big Mom while trying to steal her Road Poneglyph, he spun her Soul Pocus wheel and lost the rest of his life to her. Zepo is voiced by Yasuhiro Takato in the original Japanese version and by Cris George in the Funimation dub.

==== Wano Country ====
Wano leaders
Title	Region	Name / Actor(s)					
Shōgun	Wano / Flower Capital	Kozuki Sukiyaki		Kurozumi Orochi		Kozuki Momonosuke	
Shōgun	Wano / Flower Capital	Ryūzaburō Ōtomo	John Burgmeier	Hiroshi Iwasaki	Keith Silverstein	Ai Orikasa Hiro Shimono	Corinne Sudberg
Daimyō	Hakumai	Shimotsuki Yasuie		?		Kawamatsu	
Daimyō	Hakumai	Bin Shimada	Kenny Green	?		Yū Mizushima	Anthony Bowling
Daimyō	Kibi	Fugetsu Omusubi		?		Denjiro	
Daimyō	Kibi	Takahiro Shimada	Daniel Penz	?		Daisuke Kishio	Christopher Wehkamp
Daimyō	Kuri	Kozuki Oden		?		Dogstorm	
Daimyō	Kuri	Hiroya Ishimaru	Robbie Daymond	?		Takaya Hashi Naomi Shindō	Jeff Plunk Mary Morgan
Daimyō	Ringo	Shimotsuki Ushimaru		?		Cat Viper	
Daimyō	Ringo	Ryōta Takeuchi	Christopher Sabat	?		Masaru Ikeda	SungWon Cho
Daimyō	Udon	Uzuki Tempura		?		Raizo	
Daimyō	Udon	Jiro Saito	Jim Johnson	?		Masashi Ebara	Andrew Kishino

Wano Country (ワノ国, Wano Kuni) is a nation in the New World unaffiliated with the World Government. It has its own warriors, the samurai, who are swordsmen so strong that not even the Navy goes near them. It was first mentioned by Dr. Hogback as Ryuma was from this particular country. Yakuza families have also formed the day when Kaido helped the Kurozumi Family overthrow the Kozuki Family. Roronoa Zoro is a descendant of Wano Country immigrants to the East Blue.

The country's culture is based on Japan, primarily the Edo period.

In Punk Hazard, the Straw Hat Crew met two residents of Wano, Kin'emon and his "son" Momonosuke, who temporarily accompanied them on their journey. Later, they discover that Momonosuke is actually the son of Kozuki Oden, and part of the royal family of Wano, and Kin'emon is his father's retainer.

===== Kozuki Family =====
The Kozuki Family (光月家, Kōzuki-ke) was originally the ruling family of Wano Country until the Kurozumi Family overthrew them with help from Kaido. Following the defeats of Kurozumi Orochi, Kaido, and Big Mon, the Kozuki Family regained their rule over Wano Country.

====== Kozuki Oden ======
Kozuki Oden (光月おでん, Kōzuki Oden), in addition to having been the daimyo of Kuri and son of the country's former shogun Kozuki Sukiyaki, was also a legendary skilled swordsman and samurai who developed his own variation of Nitoryu. Oden was specialized in the style of two swords, and wields two legendary swords: Ame no Habakiri, the sword said to be able to cut "heaven" itself, and Enma, the sword said to be able to cut to the "bottom of hell". He also was capable of utilizing all three types of Haki, including the advanced application for both Haoshoku and Busoshoku Haki, and has the ability to hear the "Voice of All Things".

Oden became a famous pirate for several years by joining the Whitebeard Pirates and later the Roger Pirates. Oden was regarded as being a tremendously powerful pirate with a great level of influence in both crews, helping the latter decipher Poneglyphs in exchange for accompanying their travels on the Grand Line. Due to his affiliation with them, Oden received a bounty (the amount of which is unknown). On his journey meeting Toki, and having their two children, Momonosuke and Hiyori.

After returning to his homeland, Kurozumi Orochi took over Wano Country with Kaido's help and they sentenced Oden to be boiled alive. After he spared his retainers from his fate, Oden was shot in the head by Kaido and died smiling.

In the anime series, Oden is voiced by Hiroya Ishimaru in the Japanese version and by Robbie Daymond in the Crunchyroll dub.

====== Kozuki Momonosuke ======
Kozuki Momonosuke (光月モモの助, Kōzuki Momonosuke) is Oden and Toki's son and Hiyori's big brother. He and some retainers were sent ahead in time by Kozuki Toki, where he wound end up eating an artificial version of the Fish-Fish Fruit: Model Azure Dragon that Dr. Vegapunk once created. He ended up being aged up twenty years by Shinobu during the war in Onigashima. Momonosuke became the Shogun of Wano after Kaido's defeat.

Kozuki Momonosuke is voiced by Ai Orikasa as a boy in the original Japanese version, Hiro Shimono as an adult in the original Japanese version, and by Corinne Sudberg in the Crunchyroll dub.

====== Other Kozuki Family members ======
- Kozuki Toki (光月トキ, Kōzuki Toki): Oden's wife who had the ability to send people into the future thanks to the powers of the Time-Time Fruit. Kozuki Toki is voiced by Keiko Han in the original Japanese version and by Scarlett McAlister in the Crunchyroll dub.
- Kozuki Hiyori (光月日和, Kōzuki Hiyori): Oden and Toki's daughter and Momonosuke's younger sister who has been hiding her identity by becoming known as Komurasaki (小紫), working as an oiran of the tayu (太夫 tayū?) rank, the highest of all. Kozuki Hiyori is voiced by Nana Mizuki as an adult in the original Japanese version, Hitomi Ōwada as a child in the original Japanese version, and by Molly Searcy in the Crunchyroll dub.
- Kozuki Sukiyaki (光月スキヤキ, Kōzuki Sukiyaki): Oden's father, Momonosuke and Hiyori's grandfather and the previous Shogun who was believed to be dead for decades. After the war in Onigashima, it was revealed that he was under the identity of the legendary blacksmith Tenguyama Hitetsu all along. Even after Orochi was overthrown, Sukiyaki remained hidden over what he allowed to befall Wano Country. Kozuki Sukiyaki is voiced by Ryūzaburō Ōtomo as an adult in the original Japanese version, Reimi as a baby in the original Japanese version, and by John Burgmeier in the Crunchyroll dub.
  - Bunbuku (分福, Bunbuku-kun): Kozuki Sukiyaki's teapot who "ate" the Dog-Dog Fruit: Model Tanuki which gives it the appearance of a tanuki/teapot hybrid.

===== Akazaya Nine =====
Kozuki Oden has different retainers. They together form the group known as the "Akazaya Nine" (赤鞘九人男, Akazaya Kunin Otoko; lit. "Nine Red Scabbards"), a group of powerful samurai who serve Oden and the Kozuki family:

- Kin'emon (錦えもん): Also known as "Kin'emon of Foxfire" (狐火の錦えもん, Kitsune-bi no Kin'emon), is a samurai and the leader of the Akazaya Nine. He has the power of the Garb-Garb Fruit, which allows him to create clothes for others if they place a leaf on their head.^{[ch. 663]} He was sent ahead in time by Kozuki Toki, where he managed to recruit the Straw Hats to what would become the Ninja-Pirate-Mink-Samurai Alliance. Kin'emon is voiced by Kenyu Horiuchi in the original Japanese version and by Chris Ryan in the Crunchyroll dub.
- Denjiro (傳ジロー, Denjirō): A samurai, a retainer, and a member of the Nine Red Scabbards who for years became a yakuza boss with the alias of Kyoshiro to hide his identity. After Kaido's defeat, he becomes Daimyo of Kibi. Denjiro is voiced by Daisuke Kishio in the original Japanese version and by Christopher Wehkamp in the Funimation dub.
- Kikunojo (菊の丞, Kikunojō): A samurai, a retainer, and member of the Nine Red Scabbards who is Izo's sister. Born as a boy, she has always felt like a woman in her heart. After Kaido's defeat, she becomes Daimyo of Ringo. Kikunojo is voiced by Mariya Ise in the original Japanese version, Kayleigh McKee as an adult in the Crunchyroll dub, and Bryn Apprill as a young girl in the Crunchyroll dub.
- Raizo (雷ぞう, Raizō): A ninja, a samurai, a retainer, and member of the Nine Red Scabbards. He ate the Scroll-Scroll Fruit which enables him to create and manipulate scrolls. After Kaido's defeat, he becomes Daimyo of Udon. Raizo is voiced by Masashi Ebara in the original Japanese version and by Andrew Kishino in the Crunchyroll dub.
- Ashura Doji (アシュラ童子, Ashura Dōji): A former bandit, a samurai, a retainer, and member of the Nine Red Scabbards who was once called Kuri's monster. After Kozuki Oden's death, he reverted to banditry under an alias. Ashura Doji later sacrificed his life to protect the rest of the Nine Red Scabbards from Kurozumi Kanjuro's illustrated explosives. Ashura Doji is voiced by Nobuo Tobita in the original Japanese version and by Ricco Fajardo in the Crunchyroll dub.
- Kawamatsu (河松, Kawamatsu): A Japanese pufferfish-type fish-man who pretends to be a kappa while operating as a samurai, a sumo wrestler, a retainer, and member of the Nine Red Scabbards. After Kaido's defeat, he becomes Daimyo of Hakumai. Kawamatsu is voiced by Yū Mizushima as an adult in the original Japanese version, Yūta Kasuya as a boy in the original Japanese version, Anthony Bowling as an adult in the Crunchyroll dub, and Lindsay Seidel as a boy in the Funimation dub.
- Shinobu (しのぶ): A kunoichi who has the power of the Ripe Ripe Fruit. She is able to age Momonosuke up 20 years in the climax of the Wano Country Arc. She is portrayed by Yuriko Yamamoto in the original Japanese version, and Morgan Garrett in the Funimation dub.
- Dogstorm and Cat Viper
- Kanjuro

Izo, although not part of the group, was also a retainer for Kozuki Oden alongside them.

===== Kurozumi Family =====
The Kurozumi Family (黒炭家, Kurozumi-ke) are one of the six ruling families of Wano Country. After falling out of power following a failed coup, they allied with Kaido and the Animal Kingdom Pirates who helped procure their shogunate.

====== Kurozumi Orochi ======
Kurozumi Orochi (黒炭オロチ, Kurozumi Orochi) was the head of the Kurozumi family and Kaido-installed shogun of the Wano Country, who had the ability to become a Yamata no Orochi or a Yamata no Orochi-human hybrid thanks to the powers of the Snake-Snake Fruit: Model Yamata no Orochi. One of the main antagonists of the Wano Country arc, Orochi was a power-hungry tyrant who did not care about the country or its citizens, as he oppressed the citizens for twenty years to the point where he fed starving villagers malfunctioning SMILE Fruits and robbing them of negative emotions, while Wano Country devolved into despondency. He was later betrayed by Kaido to further his goals. He survived Kaido's attack and was later killed by Denjiro. He was succeeded by Momonosuke who became the rightful Shogun of Wano after Kaido's defeat.

Kurozumi Orochi is voiced by Hiroshi Iwasaki in the original Japanese version and by Keith Silverstein in the Crunchyroll dub.

====== Kurozumi Tama ======
Kurozumi Tama (黒炭玉, Kurozumi Tama) is a girl from Wano Country's Kuri region, member of the Kurozumi family, and an aspiring kunoichi who knew Portgas D. Ace and allies with the Straw Hat Crew against the forces of Kaido and Big Mom. Having eaten the Millet-Millet Fruit, Tama can produce dango from her cheeks which have the power to control animals and anyone who has eaten the SMILE fruits for about a month. Following the death of Kurozumi Orochi and the defeat of Kaido and Big Mom, she gains approval from Monkey D. Luffy to join the Straw Hat Crew, training to become a kunoichi beforehand. Tama is the only survivor of the Kurozumi family as her surname and ancestry was never mentioned or known to other characters, with the former briefly alluded to in a flashback to her parents' demise. Oda confirmed this in the 105th volume of the manga.

Kurozumi Tama is voiced by Megumi Han in the original Japanese version and by Sarah Wiedenheft in the Crunchyroll dub.

====== Other Kurozumi Family members ======
- Kurozumi Higurashi (黒炭ひぐらし, Kurozumi Higurashi): Was a member of the Kurozumi Family. She ate the Clone-Clone Fruit, which enables her to assume the form of anyone. Kurozumi Higurashi was later killed by Kaido when she interfered in his duel with Kozuki Oden, with her Devil Fruit being eaten some time after her death by Bentham. Kurozumi Higurashi is voiced by Hiroko Emori in the original Japanese version.
- Kurozumi Kanjuro (黒炭カン十郎, Kanjūrō): Was a samurai, a retainer, and member of the Kurozumi family who has the ability to give life to the drawings thanks to the powers of the Brush-Brush Fruit. He was in reality a spy for his relative Kurozumi Orochi, having pledged loyalty to Oden as one of his retainers in order to unsuccessfully die in his execution and later interfering with the activities of the Akazaya Nine. Kanjuro was lethally wounded by Kine'mon and died from his wounds. Kurozumi Kanjuro is voiced by Takumi Yamazaki in the original Japanese version and by Ben Bryant in the Funimation dub.

===== Yamato =====
Yamato (ヤマト), also known as "Ogre Princess" (鬼姫, Onihime),^{[ch. 1024]} is Kaido's daughter.^{[ch. 984]} Yamato idolizes Kozuki Oden to the point of adopting male pronouns to be more like him,^{[ch. 983]}^{[ch. 1024]} and even proclaiming to be Oden himself, like saying Momonosuke (Oden's son) is her son.^{[ch. 988,989,1057]} Having witnessed Oden's death, Yamato proclaimed to inherit his will of freeing Wano from Kaido's tyranny, destroying her relationship with her father.^{[ch. 985]} Imprisoned by Kaido for her rebellious acts, she read Oden's logbook with the help of three Wano samurai and eventually befriends a visiting Ace.^{[ch. 999]} Yamato consumed the Dog-Dog Fruit: Model Okuchi no Makami, enabling her to become the titular mythological Japanese wolf deity which can produce cold and ice attacks.^{[ch. 1020]} Yamato teams up with the Straw Hats to defeat Kaido, ultimately freeing her from Kaido's control. She refuses to accept an offer to join the Straw Hats yet, opting to complete a journey around Wano to ensure its safety first beforehand; she befriends and recruits Ulti and Page One after defeating Who's-Who.^{[ch. 1146]}

Yamato is voiced by Saori Hayami in the original Japanese version, and by Michelle Rojas in the Crunchyroll dub.

The character is named after the Japanese folk hero Yamato Takeru.

===== Yakuza =====
There are several yakuza groups that operate in Wano Country.

Five yakuza leaders were captured by Kurozumi Orochi before being freed by Luffy. The known leaders of the yakuza are:

- Hyogoro (ヒョウ五郎, Hyōgorō): A short elderly man who was a legendary leader of a yakuza group in the Flower Capital. Hyogoro is voiced by Tomomichi Nishimura in the original Japanese version and by Doug Jackson in the Crunchyroll dub.
- Omasa (大マサ, Ōmasa): A large man who runs a yakuza group in Udon. Omasa is voiced by Koji Haramaki in the original Japanese version and by William Ofoegbu in the Crunchyroll dub.
- Tsunagoro (綱ゴロー, Tsunagorō): A thin man who runs a yakuza group in Hakumai. Tsunagoro is voiced by Masaya Takatsuka in the original Japanese version and by Sean Leteorneau in the Crunchyroll dub.
- Cho (お蝶, O-Chō): A woman who runs a yakuza group in Ringo. Cho is voiced by Fumi Mizusawa in the original Japanese version and by Cassie Ewulu in the Crunchyroll dub.
- Yatappe (弥太っぺ, Yatappe): A man who runs a yakuza group in Kibi. Yatappe is voiced by Yasunori Matsutana in the original Japanese version and by Stephen E. Moellering in the Crunchyroll dub.

The Kyoshiro Family (狂死郎一家, Kyōshirō Ikka) is a yakuza group led by Denjirou under the alias Kyoshiro. Besides Denjirou, the other members of the Kyoshiro Family are:

- Kuni (クニさん, Kuni-san): A member of the Kyoshiro Family. Kuni is voiced by Takashi Matsuyama in the original Japanese version and by Cory J. Phillips in the Crunchyroll dub.
- Kaku (カクさん, Kaku-san): A tall and thin member of the Kyoshiro Family with a long neck. Kaku is voiced by Yūsuke Numata in the original Japanese version and by Alejandro Saab in the Crunchyroll dub.
- Suke (スケさん, Suke-san): A very large member of the Kyoshiro Family. Suke is voiced by Toshihiro Okubo in the original Japanese version and by Dave Trosko in the Funimation dub.

===== Other Wano inhabitants =====
- Minatomo (港友, Minatomo): A short elderly man and a legendary carpenter operating in the Flower Capital. Minatomo is voiced by Jun'ichi Sugawara in the original Japanese version and by Brian Mathis in the Crunchyroll dub.
- Hoisassa (保井さっ左, Hoisassa): A retainer of the Kurozumi family. He and this three co-workers pull Kurozumi Orochi's carriage and have eaten a Horse SMILE variant. They possess the hindquarters of a horse, giving them an appearance similar to the Ipotane.
- Toko (トコ, Toko): A little girl who lives in the Flower Capital. Because she ate a SMILE that was a dud, she is unable to express negative emotions. Toko is voiced by Kara Edwards in the Crunchyroll dub.
- Shimotsuki Yasuie (霜月康イエ, Shimotsuki Yasuie): Also known as Tonoyasu or Yasu, is a beggar / sycophant who lives in Ebisu and is the adoptive father of Toko. He is the last surviving daimyo who had served under Oden's father, Sukiyaki, and oversaw the Ringo region before Orochi became shogun; he managed to start the Raid on Onigashima at his execution. Yasu is voiced by Bin Shimada in the original Japanese version and by Kenny Green in the Crunchyroll dub.
- Komachiyo (狛ちよ, Komachiyo): A large Komainu who has been loyal to Kurozumi Tama and resides in Amagasa Village. Kamachiyo's vocal effects are provided by Sōta Arai in the original Japanese version and by Irwin Daye in the Crunchyroll dub.
- Onimaru (オニ丸, Onimaru): A komagitsune who resides in Ringo and ate the Human-Human Fruit: Model Ōnyūdō that enables him to turn into a 4-meter (13 ft) Ōnyūdō or a Ōnyūdō-komagitsune hybrid enabling him to use the alias of Gyukimaru (牛鬼丸, Gyūkimaru) and gain the power of speech. When his daimyo companion Shimotsuki Ushimaru died, Onimaru joined the resistance movement against Kaido. Onimaru is voiced by Hiroshi Shirokuma in the original Japanese version and by Cyras Rodas in the Crunchyroll dub.

Other inhabitants include several ninjas and samurai under the service of Kurozumi Orochi who ended up abandoning him to join the Animal Kingdom Pirates.

==== Elbaph ====
Elbaph (エルバフ, Erubafu) is a mountainous island that is inhabited by giants and has a colossal tree called Treasure Tree Adam that dwarfs all of Elbaph. The lower regions are snow-coated mountains and are labeled the "Underworld". The upper regions are on the tree and are labeled the "Sun World". The highest level is classified as the "Astral World". Travel to either of the levels requires the use of an artificial rainbow.

Elbaph is based on the Viking culture and on the Norse mythology.

It is ruled under the Warland Kingdom, with its leader currently vacant after Harald's death.

Besides the Giant Warrior Pirates, the New Giant Warrior Pirates, and John Giant, the following reside in Elbaph:

===== Harald =====
Harald (ハラルド, Hararudo) is a giant with ancient giant lineage, the former King of Elbaph, and the father of Loki and Hajrudin. A childhood friend of Dorry and Brogy, he is a spoilt and extremely violent man whose strength and iron-fist rule led to him becoming a feared figure around the world. A chance meeting with foreign giant Ida (with whom he sired Hajrudin) motivated him to turn over a new leaf, becoming an honorable person and prioritizing the country's development on education and diplomacy. Due to his responsibilities, he neglected his sons' needs, leading to Loki's constant abuse by his family, though Hajrudin was not affected. At different points, Harald had declined the invitation of Rocks D. Xebec to join the Rocks Pirates in his plan of world domination. After witnessing Rocks' death during the God Valley Incident, he destroys his horns and chooses to serve the World Government as a Devoted Blade, defeating pirates in exchange for Elbaph's pending membership. Harald is later killed by his soldiers on his orders due to the World Government's manipulation of his mental state, with Loki willingly bearing responsibility.

===== Loki =====
Loki (ロキ, Roki) is a very large giant with a demonic appearance and an ancient giant lineage who is the son of King Harald, the Prince of Elbaph, and the half-brother of Hajrudin.

Born to Harald and Estrid, he was thrown into the Underworld by his mother due to his demonic eyes, only to climb his way back to the palace by himself. He met Rocks D. Xebec when attempting suicide and failed to persuade Xebec to let him join up with the Rocks Pirates. Loki was blamed by the public for any grievances on Elbaph, be it natural disasters or deaths of any cause. Despite Harald's love, his non-presence and further abuse by family led to Loki growing into a lonely and violent yet fundamentally misunderstood individual. Despite her illegitimacy, he considers Hajrudin's mother Ida to be his own, massacring a village for poisoning her to death. At one point in his life, Loki was to have an arranged marriage with Charlotte Lola, spitefully arranged by Elbaph elders and Big Mom due to the latter and Loki's poor reputation in Elbaph.

When Harald started losing control of Imu's gift, he advised Loki to flee with the legendary Devil Fruit and to rule Elbaph. As Loki fled, he was confronted by Ragnir, who allowed Loki to eat the Dragon-Dragon Fruit: Model Niddhoggr, which gives him the ability to transform into a dragon or a dragon-giant hybrid. Afterward, Loki killed Harald in self-defense.

Loki is voiced by Yuichi Nakamura in the original Japanese version of the anime.

The character is named after the god of the Norse mythology Loki.

====== Ragnir ======
Ragnir (鉄雷, Raguniru) is a war hammer believed to contain the spirit of Ratatoskr that gained sentience after consuming a Devil Fruit called the Squirrel-Squirrel Fruit: Model Ratatoskr, which enables it to transform into a squirrel or a squirrel-war hammer hybrid as well as summon lightning and ice. Ragnir is the guardian of the Legendary Devil Fruit, only allowing the worthy to eat it. Ragnir serves as comedic relief and a companion to Loki and Luffy.

===== Jaguar D. Saul =====
Jaguar D. Saul (ハグワール・D・サウロ, Haguwāru Dī Sauro) is a giant and former Vice Admiral of the Marines.

Jaguar was loyal to the World Government until the Buster Call was unleashed on Ohara, Jaguar risked his life and abandoned his post to save a young Nico Robin, only to be frozen by Kuzan. He later escapes from the thawing ice and retires in Elbaph despite his foreign nature, helping a clone of Dr. Vegapunk gain access to Elbaph's library. He becomes a history professor and teaches at Elbaph's Owl School until it was burned down amidst the country's invasion. He reunites with Robin after the Straw Hats arrive.

Jaguar D. Saul is voiced by Takeshi Kusao in the original Japanese version. In Funimation dub, he was voiced by Cole Brown in the earlier episodes and by Mark Stoddart in Movie 8 and the later episode starting at 1042.

===== Biblo =====
Biblo (ビブロ, Biburo) is an old giant owl who is the chief librarian of the Owl Library. He ate the Grow-Grow Fruit, which enables him to increase the size of inanimate objects.

Biblo's vocal effects are provided by Hiromu Miyazaki in the original Japanese version.

===== Other Elbaph inhabitants =====
- Jarul (ヤルル): 67 ft. giant elder and former co-captain of the Giant Warrior Pirates who is regarded as a hero among the giants of Elbaph. As he is attacked by the World Government and other giants, Jarul decides to acquit Loki and expose the true events behind Harald's death. Jarul is voiced by Masaharu Satō in the original Japanese version and by Jason Douglas in the Funimation dub.
- Collun (コロン, Koron): A young half-giant with pink hair who is the son of the giant Ripley and the human Scopper Gaban. He wishes to become a giant warrior instead of settling for a peaceful life, leading to him being ostracized by his peers. He is voiced by Arisa Sekine in the original Japanese version.
- Ripley (リプリー, Ripurī): A warrior and biology teacher at the Walrus School who is Collun's mother and Scopper Gaban's wife. Ripley is voiced by Farahnaz Nikray in the original Japanese version.
- Mato (マト, Mato): A female giant who is a bartender. Mato is voiced by Maki Tsuruta in the original Japanese version and by Amanda Gael in the Crunchyroll dub.
- Ange (アンジェ, Anje): A female giant who works as a librarian of the Owl Library and is the assistant teacher of Jaguar D. Saul. Due to the ransom demand of the Holy Knights, Ange was forced to burn down the Owl Library. Ange is voiced by Miyuki Kawasho in the original Japanese version.
- Biblo (ビブロ, Biburo): An old giant owl who is the chief librarian of the Owl Library. He ate the Grow-Grow Fruit, which enables him to increase the size of inanimate objects. Biblo's vocal effects are provided by Hiromu Miyazaki in the original Japanese version.
- Kiba (キバ, Kiba): A giant with walrus-like tusks who is the principal of the Walrus School and a former member of the Giant Warrior Pirates.
- Wolf (ウォルフ, Worufu): A giant who is the gym teacher of the Walrus School.
- Aegir (エーギル, Ēgiru): A giant boy who is a student at the Walrus School.
- Olav (オラブ, Orabu): A giant boy who is a student at the Walrus School and is the grandson of Oimo.
- Ylva (イルヴァ, Iruva): A giant girl who is a student at the Walrus School and the great-great-granddaughter of Jarul.
- Estrid (エストリッダ, Esutoridda): The late wife of King Harald, the mother of Prince Loki, and the Queen of Elbaph who has ancient giant lineage. She was frightened by Loki's demonic appearance and threw him into the Underworld, though he managed to climb out. 62 years later, Estrid died of an unknown cause; she stated on her deathbed that Elbaph's current predicaments are caused by Loki's curse.

== Worldwide groups ==
=== Revolutionary Army ===
The Revolutionary Army (革命軍, Kakumeigun) is a globally operating military force of rebels, openly aiming to overthrow the World Government. To that end, they incite revolutions in countries around the world. The organization is led by the world's most wanted man, Monkey D. Dragon, who is known to the public only as Dragon.^{[ch. 432]} Also previously unknown to the public are his family ties; he is the son of Garp and father of Luffy.^{[ch. 432]} Next in command after Dragon is Sabo, Luffy's sworn brother.

Before the events in Dressrosa, they were based on Baltigo, but after the Blackbeard Pirates attacked the island because of the presence of one of their Ten Titanic Captains, they moved to Kamabakka Kingdom.

==== Monkey D. Dragon ====
Monkey D. Dragon (モンキー・D・ドラゴン, Monkī Dī Doragon), commonly known simply as "Dragon the Revolutionary", is the father of Monkey D. Luffy and the son of the naval hero Monkey D. Garp. He was previously in the Marines like his father but deserted it after seeing corruption and formed the Freedom Fighters to overthrow corrupt monarchs before becoming the infamous leader and founder of the Revolutionary Army who have been attempting to overthrow the World Government. Not much is known about his activities, background, history, or power. He is the World Government's greatest enemy, and is the most dangerous and most wanted man in the world. Dragon's family ties were revealed to the world, following the end of the Battle of Marineford. Despite his non-presence, Dragon cherishes his son, keeping a distance to save him from persecution with Garp, though he saved Luffy from execution at Loguetown and deescalated the situation.^{[ch. 558]}^{[ch. 794]}

Dragon is voiced by Hidekatsu Shibata in the original Japanese version, with Kazuhiko Inoue voicing his younger self. In the 4Kids English adaptation, he was voiced by Dan Green, and in the Funimation English version of the series, he is voiced by Bryan Massey. In the live-action series, Dragon is portrayed by Rigo Sanchez.

==== Sabo ====
Sabo (サボ) is the chief of staff of the Revolutionary Army and sworn brother to Monkey D. Luffy and Portgas D. Ace.^{[ch. 585, 744]} Introduced as a noble from the Goa Kingdom years before the series' present, Sabo leaves his home and family to live in the Gray Terminal. After he and Ace befriend Luffy, the three of them exchange cups of sake and become "brothers" (similar to the initiation ritual in yakuza organizations). Sabo's ship is destroyed by a Celestial Dragon. Though he is thought to have been killed in the attack, Sabo survived and was rescued by Monkey D. Dragon, though he suffers from amnesia. Under Dragon, he joins the Revolutionary Army and ascends the ranks. After hearing of Ace's death, Sabo's grief causes his memory to return. Although remaining loyal to the Revolutionary Army, Sabo becomes determined to obtain Ace's Devil Fruit, the Flame-Flame Fruit, to inherit Ace's will. He later finds it as the prize of a tournament on Dressrosa, where he reunites with Luffy and takes his place by using Luffy's alias "Lucy".^{[ch. 744]} After winning the tournament, Sabo eats the Flame-Flame Fruit and battles Admiral Fujitora and Jesus Burgess in an effort to protect Luffy.

He is voiced by Tōru Furuya as an adult and as a child by Junko Takeuchi. After Furuya stepped down from the role, he was replaced by Miyu Irino from episode 1116 onwards. In the Funimation English adaptation, his adult voice is supplied by Vic Mignogna in the dub of One Piece Film: Gold and Episode of Sabo and by Johnny Yong Bosch in all other appearances, while his child voice is supplied by Morgan Garrett.

==== Emporio Ivankov ====
Emporio Ivankov (エンポリオ・イワンコフ, Enporio Iwankofu), nicknamed "Miracle Person" (奇跡の人, Kiseki no Hito), is the bigender Captain of the Revolutionaries' G Army (G軍, G-gun) which covers the Grand Line, a close comrade of Dragon, and the queen of the drag queen (お釜, okama) queendom Kamabakka (カマバッカ). Ivankov can inject hormones into a person's body by making their finger nails into syringes, creating various effects like increased healing abilities, increased vigor, or changing the person's gender thanks to the powers of the Horm-Horm Fruit.^{[ch. 537–539]} Emporio Ivankov is voiced by Norio Imamura from episodes 438-460 of the original Japanese version and by Mitsuo Iwata starting in Episode 461 of the original Japanese version. In the Funimation dub, they are voiced by Randy Pearlman. They are based on Dr. Frank-N-Furter from The Rocky Horror Picture Show as portrayed by Tim Curry.

==== Captains ====
The captains (軍隊長, guntaichō; army commanders) of the Revolutionary Army lead divisions, each representing a sea. Ivankov represents the Grand Line. Kumo and Ginny were formerly captains. Aside from Ivankov, the current captains are:

- Karasu (カラス): The captain of the Revolutionaries' North Army (北軍, Hokugun) that covers the North Blue, is a man capable of turning his body into a flock of crows and communicating through it.^{[ch. 904]} This would later be revealed to be one of the abilities of the Soot-Soot Fruit, which enables Kasaru to generate, control, and become soot. Karasu is voiced by Takeshi Kusao in the original Japanese version and by Matt Fowler in the Funimation dub.
- Belo Betty (ベロ・ベティ, Bero Beti): The captain of the Revolutionaries' East Army (東軍, Tōgun) that covers the East Blue, a woman with the power to cheer people up by waving a flag thanks to the powers of the Pump-Pump Fruit.^{[ch. 904]} Belo Betty is voiced by Yūko Kaida in the original Japanese version and by Kristi Rothrock in the Funimation dub.
- Morley (モーリー, Mōrī): The captain of the Revolutionaries' West Army (西軍, Seigun) that covers the West Blue, who is a 41 ft. giant capable of shaping the environment like the floor and the walls like molding clay after eating the Push-Push Fruit.^{[ch. 904]} Morley is voiced by Kenta Miyake in the original Japanese version and by Brad Kurtz in the Funimation dub.
- Lindbergh (リンドバーグ, Rindobāgu): The captain of the Revolutionaries' South Army (南軍, Nangun) that covers the South Blue, who is a cat-type mink working as Revolutionary Army's scientist.^{[ch. 904]} Lindbergh is voiced by Hisayoshi Suganuma in the original Japanese version and by Mike Haimoto in the Funimation dub.

==== Deputy Captains ====
The deputy captains (副軍隊長, fuku guntaichō; deputy commanders) are second-in command of divisions, each representing a sea and assisting their captains.

- Inazuma (イナズマ): The deputy captain of the G Army, serving under Ivankov as his right-hand man, who is a Newkama.^{[ch. 539]} Inazuma can turn his hands into giant scissors capable of cutting and deforming almost anything as if it were paper thanks to the powers of the Snip-Snip Fruit.^{[ch. 540]} In the original Japanese version, Inazuma is voiced by Kenji Hamada as a male and by Umeka Shōji as a female. In the Funimation dub, he is voiced by Christopher Wehkamp as a male and by Angela Chase as a female.
- Jiron (ジロン): The deputy captain of the North Army, serving under Kasaru as his right-hand.^{[ch. 1082]}
- Ahiru (あひる): The deputy captain of East Army, serving under Betty as her right-hand, who is a woman with a cybernetic left arm.^{[ch. 1082]}
- Ushiano (ウシアーノ, Ushiāno): The deputy captain of the West Army, serving under Morley as her right-hand, who is a cattle-type mink.^{[ch. 1082]}
- Gambo (ギャンボ, Gyanbo): The deputy captain of the South Army, serving under Lindbergh as his right hand. He loves bets and will use any chance to start one.^{[ch. 1082]}

==== Ginny ====
Ginny (ジニー, Jinī) is the former captain of the East Army of the Revolutionaries. She was once enslaved alongside Emporio Ivankov and became close enough to refer to him as her big brother. She escaped during the God Valley Incident and became good friends with Bartholomew Kuma. Ivankov later recruited Ginny and Kuma into the Revolutionaries. She is known for her rambunctious appetite, which is passed on to her daughter Bonney. She was abducted and forcibly married to a Celestial Dragon, with Jaygarcia Saturn experimenting on her. She later gave birth to Bonney and escaped with her, dying of complications of said experiments after delivering her child to Kuma. Kuma promised Ginny as her grave that he would raise Bonney as his own daughter.^{[ch. 1095-1100]}

==== Hack ====
Hack (ハック, Hakku) is a Fish-Man Karate Instructor in the Revolutionary Army and Japanese soldierfish-type fish-man. He was once enslaved but escaped during the God Valley Incident. Hack partook in the tournament for the Flare-Flare Fruit at Dressrosa, where he was part of the B-Block fight.^{[ch. 707]} Hack is voiced by Kōsei Hirota in the original Japanese version and by Garret Schenck in the Funimation dub except for some episodes, where he is voiced by Kent Williams.

==== Koala ====
Koala (コアラ, Koara) is an Assistant Fish-Man Karate Instructor in the Revolutionary Army. She was a slave who was saved by Fisher Tiger from Celestial Dragons, able to heal from her trauma with help from the Sun Pirates including a reluctant Arlong. She joined the Revolutionary Army as a teenager, being treated like a high-ranking officer and contributing greatly to its management despite being a mere instructor.

Koala is voiced by Satsuki Yukino in the original Japanese version and by Jeannie Tirado in the Funimation dub.

=== Baroque Works ===
Baroque Works
Men	Devil Fruit	Anime voice actor(s)		Live actor(s)	Women	Devil Fruit	Anime voice actor(s)		Live actor(s)
Men	Devil Fruit	JP	US	Live actor(s)	Women	Devil Fruit	JP	US	Live actor(s)
Mr. 0 (Sir Crocodile)	Sand-Sand	Ryūzaburō Ōtomo	David Brimmer John Swasey	Joe Manganiello	Ms. All-Sunday (Nico Robin)	Flower-Flower	Yuriko Yamaguchi	Veronica Taylor Stephanie Young	Lera Abova
Mr. 1 (Daz Bonez)	Dice-Dice	Tetsu Inada	Scottie Ray Brett Weaver	TBD	Ms. Doublefinger (Zala/Pola)	Spike-Spike	Rin Mizuhara Yuko Tachibana	Eva Kaminsky Kathleen Delaney Leah Clark	TBD
Mr. 2 Bon Clay (Bentham)	Clone-Clone	Kazuki Yao	Kevin Kolack Barry Yandell	Cole Escola	—N/a				
Mr. 3 (Galdino)	Wax-Wax	Nobuyuki Hiyama	Tom Souhrada Duncan Brannan	David Dastmalchian	Ms. Golden Week (Marianne)	—N/a	Akiko Nakagawa	Cherami Leigh	Sophia Anne Caruso
Mr. 4 (Babe)	—N/a	Masaya Takatsuka	David Lapkin Scott Hinze	TBD	Ms. Merry Christmas (Drophy)	Mole-Mole	Mami Kingetsu	Kayzie Rogers Wendy Powell	TBD
Mr. 5 (Gem)	Bomb-Bomb	Masaya Takatsuka	Scottie Ray Andrew Love	Camrus Johnson	Ms. Valentine (Mikita)	Kilo-Kilo	Fumiko Orikasa	Amy Palant Jamie Marchi	Jazzara Jaslyn
Mr. 6	not depicted				Ms. Mother's Day	not depicted			
Mr. 7	—N/a	Keisuke	David Lapkin Anthony Bowling	TBD	Ms. Father's Day	—N/a	Tomoko Naka	Erica Schroeder Cynthia Cranz	TBD
Mr. 8 (Igaram)	—N/a	Keiichi Sonobe	Richard Will Rob Mungle	Yonda Thomas	Ms. Monday	—N/a	Makiko Ohmoto	Russell Velazquez Clarine Harp	Chiedza Mhende
Mr. 9	—N/a	Yasuhiro Takato	Michael Sinterniklaas Chris Patton	Daniel Lasker	Ms. Wednesday (Nefertari Vivi)	—N/a	Misa Watanabe	Karen Neil Caitlin Glass	Charithra Chandran

Baroque Works (バロック・ワークス, Barokku Wākusu) is a secret organization of more than two thousand members whose aim is to stage a coup d'état in the Alabasta Kingdom. Using code names, Mr. 0 (Sir Crocodile) and Ms. All-Sunday (Nico Robin) serve as the organization's president and vice-president respectively. Taking orders directly from them are thirteen male agents, who use the code names Mr. 1 through Mr. 13, and their female partners, who use code names taken from days of the week or holidays and happy events.^{[ch. 161f.]}

Agents Mr. 1 through Mr. 5, and their partners are called Officer Agents and entrusted with only the most important of missions.^{[ch. 155]} Agents Mr. 6 through Mr. 12 and their partners are called Frontier Agents who oversee the other operations.

==== Officer Agents ====
- Daz Bonez, code named Mr. 1, is Ms. Doublefinger's partner.
- Zala (ザラ, Zara): Code named Ms. Doublefinger (ミス・ダブルフィンガー, Misu Daburufingā; named after New Year's Day), (Note: Ms. Doublefinger is named after the New Year's Day. Oda has noted that this is 1/1 or two fingers, or "double finger".^{[ch. 161f.]})^{[ch. 190, 533]} also known as Pola (ポーラ, Pōra) when she works as the bartender and owner of the Spiders Café, was the highest-ranking female Officer Agent of Baroque Works and Mr. 1's partner, whose body can grow spikes thanks to the powers of the Spike-Spike Fruit. Ms. Doublefinger is voiced by Rin Mizuhara in episodes 103 and 104 of the original Japanese version, Yuko Tachibana starting in Episode 107 of the original Japanese version, Eva Kaminsky in the 4Kids dub (except in One Piece: Grand Battle! Rush!, where she is voiced by Kathleen Delaney), and by Leah Clark in the Funimation dub. In the live-action series, she is portrayed by Daisy Head.
- Bentham (ベンサム, Bensamu): Better known under his codename "Mr. 2 Bon Clay" (Mr.2ボン・クレー, Misutā Tsū Bon Kurē), is a member of Baroque Works who is a drag queen (オカマ, okama) and a skilled martial artist with the power of the Paramecia-type Clone-Clone Fruit (マネマネの実, Mane Mane no Mi), which allows him to transform into an exact copy of anyone whose face he once touched with his right hand.^{[ch. 156, 532]} He has a flamboyant attitude which includes singing and performing ballet moves. He is the only Baroque Works Officer Agent without a female partner,^{[ch. 155]} because he fills both roles himself. Likewise, his code name is a composite of a male Officer Agent's number, "Mr. 2", and a female Official Agent's holiday code name, "Bon Clay", which represents the Bon Festival and year-end festivals.^{[ch. 161f.]} In the original Japanese series, he is voiced by Kazuki Yao. In the 4Kids English adaptation, he is voiced by Kevin Kolack. In the Funimation English adaptation, his voice is supplied by Barry Yandell. In the live-action series, Bentham, reimagined as non-binary, is portrayed by Cole Escola.
- Galdino, code named Mr. 3, is Ms. Goldenweek's partner.
- Marianne (マリアンヌ, Mariannu): Code named Ms. Goldenweek (ミス・ゴールデンウィーク, Misu Gōrudenwīku; named after the Japanese Golden Week) is an artist and member of Baroque who can manipulate emotions using paint and is paired with Mr. 3.^{[ch. 124, 161]} Goldenweek is voiced by Akiko Nakagawa in the original Japanese version and by Cherami Leigh in the Funimation dub. In the live-action series, Goldenweek is portrayed by Sophia Anne Caruso.
- Babe (ベーブ, Bēbu): Code named Mr. 4, is a member of Baroque Works who fights using a four-ton baseball bat and Ms. Merry Christmas' partner. Mr. 4 is voiced by Masaya Takatsuka in the original Japanese version and by David Lapkin and Scott Hinze in the 4Kids and Funimation dubs respectively.
  - Lassoo (ラッスー, Rassū): Babe's bazooka-like gun who can transform into a dachshund or a dachshund-bazooka hybrid after it "ate" the Dog-Dog Fruit: Model Dachshund. Lassoo's vocal effects are provided by Masaya Takatsuka in the original Japanese version, Takeshi Aono in Episode of Alabasta: The Desert Princess and the Pirates, and Koji Hiramaki in One Piece: Grand Battle! Rush! and One Piece: Pirates Carnival. In the Funimation dub, he is voiced by Christopher Bevins.
- Drophy (ドロフィー, Dorofi): Code named Ms. Merry Christmas (ミス・メリークリスマス, Misu Merī Kurisumasu), is Mr. 4's partner who can transform into a mole or a mole-human hybrid thanks to the powers of the Mole-Mole Fruit.^{[ch. 160, 183]} Merry Christmas is voiced by Mami Kingetsu in the original Japanese version and by Kayzie Rogers and Wendy Powell in the 4Kids and Funimation dub respectively.
- Gem (ジェム, Jemu): Code named Mr. 5, is a member of Baroque Works and Ms. Valentine's partner. He can cause explosions with any part of his body, including his mucus and breath, thanks to the powers of the Bomb-Bomb Fruit. Mr. 5 is voiced by Masaya Takatsuka in the original Japanese version and by Scottie Ray and Andrew Love in the 4Kids and Funimation dubs respectively. In the live-action series, Mr. 5 is portrayed by Camrus Johnson.
- Mikita (ミキータ, Mikīta): Code named Ms. Valentine (ミス・バレンタイン, Misu Barentain), is Mr. 5's partner. She can change her weight at will due to the power of the Kilo-Kilo Fruit.^{[ch. 111f., 124]} Valentine is voiced by Fumiko Orikasa in the original Japanese version and by Amy Palant and Jamie Marchi in the 4Kids and Funimation dubs respectively. In the live-action series, Ms. Valentine is portrayed by Jazzara Jaslyn.

==== Frontier Agents ====
- Mr. 7 and Ms. Father's Day (ミス・ファーザーズデー, Misu Fāzāzu Dē): Two skilled snipers. Both of them were charged with the duty to guard the large cannon at the top of a tower that would destroy Alabasta only to be defeated by Nefertari Vivi. Mr. 7 is voiced by Keisuke in the original Japanese version and by David Lapkin and Anthony Bowling in the 4Kids and Funimation dub respectively. Ms. Father's Day is voiced by Tomoko Naka in the original Japanese version and by Erica Schroeder and Cynthia Cranz in the 4Kids and Funimation dubs respectively.
  - The previous Mr. 7 was killed in action, after it being succeeded by the current Mr. 7. Although he is only mentioned in the manga, he appears in the live-action series, portrayed by Ben Kgosimore.
- Igaram, code named Mr. 8, is Ms. Monday's partner.
- Ms. Monday (ミス・マンデー, Misu Mandē): A brown-skinned woman with pink hair and member of Baroque Works who operates in Whisky Peak. She is a super-strong woman who operated as a nun and was partnered with Igaram. Sometime after the defeat of Sir Crocodile, Monday has a child with Mr. 9. Monday is voiced by Makiko Ohmoto in the original Japanese version and by Russell Velazquez and Clarine Harp in the 4Kids and Funimation dubs respectively.
- Mr. 9: A member of Baroque Works who operates in Whisky Peak and was partnered with Nefertari Vivi. Sometime after the defeat of Sir Crocodile, Mr. 9 has a child with Ms. Monday. Mr. 9 is voiced by Yasuhiro Takato in the original Japanese version and by Michael Sinterniklaas and Chris Patton in the 4Kids and Funimation dubs respectively. In the live-action series, Mr. 9 is portrayed by Daniel Lasker.
- Nefertari Vivi, code named Ms. Wednesday, is Mr. 9's partner.
- Mr. 11: A member of Baroque Works agent who was captured by Smoker.^{[ch. 128]} While Smoker and his men were ashore, Mr. 11 was killed by Mr. Mellow of the Billions.^{[ch. 159]} 11 is voiced by Kenichi Ono in the original Japanese version and by Chris Cason in the Funimation dub. In the live-action series, Mr. 11 is portrayed by Alan Foulis.
- Miss Thursday: The partner of Mr. 11 and the sister of Mr. 4. When they encountered Smoker and Tashigi, Miss Thursday fled while Mr. 11 was apprehended. Her whereabouts are unknown. In the live-action series, Miss Thursday is portrayed by Sanchia Davids. She and Mr. 11 cause a massacre at a Marines base before she is accidentally killed by Smoker.

==== Unluckies ====
The Unluckies (アンラッキーズ, Anrakkīzu) are a duo formed by Mr. 13, a male otter, and Ms. Friday (ミス・フライデー, Misu Furaidē), a female vulture who serves as her partner's mode of transportation. Their names refer to Friday the 13th, often associated with bad luck.

Both of them are charged with reporting threats to Baroque Works and punishing any agents who fail their mission. The Straw Hat Crew first encounter them in Whisky Peak after Nefertari Vivi told them about Sir Crocodile. Mr. 13 drew their images as he and Ms. Friday fly off.^{[ch. 113]} 13 and Friday were dispatched by Crocodile to check up on Ms. Golden Week in Little Garden, only for them to be defeated by Sanji.^{[ch. 127]}

Having been apprehended by the Marines after surviving Sanji's attack, they cooperated with them by making out pictures of the Baroque Works agents who avoided capture.^{[ch. 375]}

==== Billions ====
The foot soldiers for the Officer Agents are called the 200 Billions. Its known members are:

- Akumai (アクマイ, Akumai): A member of the Billions. Akumai is voiced by Justin Cook in the Funimation dub.
- Mr. Mellow (Mr. メロウ, Misutā Merō): A member of the Billions. Mellow is voiced by Masaya Takatsuka in the original Japanese version and by Josh Martin the Funimation dub.
- Mr. Love (Mr.ラブ, Misutā Rabu): A member of the Billions who infiltrated the Rebel Army.
- Geronimo (ジェロニモ, Jeronimo): An anime-exclusive member of the Billions. Geronimo is voiced by Yasunori Matsutani in the original Japanese version and by Phil Parsons in the Funimation dub.

==== Millions ====
The foot soldiers for the Frontier Agents are called the 1,800 Millions and have eclectic codenames. Zoro confronts them at Whisky Peak and defeats most of them. Its known members are:

- Ms. Catherina (ミス・キャサリーナ, Misu Kyasarīna): A female member of the Millions who works as a nun. In the live-action series, Catherine is portrayed by Rachel Mertons. She was among the Millions who were killed by Zoro.
- Mr. Beans (ミスター・ビーンズ, Misutā Bīnzu): A small boy and a member of the Millions who is partnered with Ms. Catherina.
- Mr. Shimizu (Mr.シミズ, Misutā Shimizu): A member of the Millions who is stationed at Whisky Peak.
- Misty (ミスティ, Misuti): A female member of the Millions. In the live-action series, Misty is portrayed by Deoudoné Pretorius. This version claims to be Love's sister and was the 78th member of the Millions killed by Zoro.
- Love (愛, Ai): A female member of the Millions. In the live-action series, Love is portrayed by Natalie Walsh. This version claims to be Misty's sister and was the 77th member of the Millions killed by Zoro.
- Hercules (大力士): A member of the Millions in the video game One Piece: Fighting Path, who wields a large club. He also appears in the live-action series, portrayed by Christiaan Visagie, being the 79th member of the Millions killed by Zoro.
- Grave Digger: An unnamed gravedigger and member of the Millions. He is exclusive to the live-action series, where he was portrayed by Riaz Solker. Grave Digger was the 100th member of the Millions killed by Zoro.

=== World Economic Journal ===
The World Economic Journal (世界経済新聞, Sekai Keizai Shinbun) is a newspaper company that operates worldwide.

- Morgans (モルガンズ, Moruganzu): Nicknamed "Big News" Morgans, is the President of the World Economic Journal who is secretly one of the emperors of the world's criminal underworld. Morgans ate the Bird-Bird Fruit: Model Albatross, which enables him to turn into an albatross or a human-albatross hybrid. Morgan is voiced by Yasuyuki Kase in the original Japanese version and by Derick Snow in the Funimation dub.
- Attach (アタッチ, Atatchi): A photographer for the World Economic Journal. He previously headed the Navy's Photography Department, but was dismissed for his frequent blunders. Attach is voiced by Takashi Matsuyama in episode 883 in the original Japanese version, and by Charles C. Campbell in the Funimation dub.

== Easter Egg characters ==
In the series, some characters usually appear as easter eggs, making some cameos in the scenes as recurring jokes. Notable among them is Panda Man (パンダマン, Pandaman), a panda-headed man who is often found among crowds of characters, similar to the Where's Wally? books.

Other Easter Egg characters include Pandawoman (パンダウーマン美, Pandaūmanmi), a female version of Pandaman, normally seen in crowds on Amazon Lily, Sam (サムさん, Samu-san), a man who often appears drunk in cities, and Tomato Gang (トマトギャング, Tomato Gyangu), a tomato-headed man who pursues Pandaman.

== Anime-exclusive characters and locations ==
This section lists the characters who appeared in Toei Animation's anime series.

=== Warship Island ===
Warship Island (軍艦島, Gunkan-jima) is an anime-exclusive island in the East Blue. Its inhabitants include:

- Apis (アピス, Apisu): A young girl who befriends the Straw Hat Pirates. She ate the Whisper-Whisper Fruit which gives her the ability to talk with animals and understand them. This ability helped her take care of a dragon named Ryu. She is voiced by Masami Suzuki in the original Japanese version, by Chio Su-Ping in the Odex dub, and by Brittney Karbowski in the Funimation dub.
- Ryu (リュウ, Ryū): Also named "Grandpa Ryu" (リュウ爺, Ryū-ji), he is a species of dragon known as Millennial Dragon (千年竜, Sen'nen-ryū) who Apis cared for on Warship Island.
- Bokuden (ボクデン): Apis' grandfather, an elder man who likes to tell stories from the past, which bore others. He is voiced by Naoki Tatsuta in the original Japanese version, and by Bill Jenkins in the Funimation dub.

The island is also visited by Eric (エリック, Erikku), a mercenary hired by Nelson Royale to capture Ryu. He has the power of the Sickle-Sickle Fruit (カマカマの実, Kama Kama no Mi), which gives him long, sharp nails that he can use to create slicing air blades. Eric is voiced by Ryūsei Nakao in the original Japanese version, and by Kenny Green in the Funimation dub.

=== Ruluka ===
Ruluka (ルルカ, Ruruka-tō) is an anime-exclusive island in Paradise that is known for having the Rainbow Mist and its Ape's Concert sub-dimension in it.

- Wetton (ウェットン, Wetton): The former leader of the Wetton Pirates who sacked Ruluka and inserted himself as its mayor. In battle, he wields a mecha suit called a Flame Suit. After the collapse of the Rainbow Mist, Wetton was defeated by Sanji and a mature Rapanui Pasqua where he was arrested by Pasqua's Marine crew. Wetton is voiced by Jouji Nakata in the original Japanese version. In the English dub, he is voiced by Bob D'Haene in the 4Kids dub and by Vic Mignogna in the Funimation dub.
- Flip (フリップ, Furippu): The son of Wetton who leads the Collection Party on Ruluka. In battle, he wields a bazooka. After the collapse of the Rainbow Mist, Flip was defeated by Sanji and Tony Tony Chopper and arrested by the Marines. Flip is voiced by Hisao Egawa in the original Japanese version. In the English dub, Flip is voiced by Phil Parsons in the Funimation dub.
- Lake (レイク, Reiku): The son of Flip and the grandson of Wetton who leads the Dynamo Party on Ruluka. In battle, he wields a mecha suit called an Electric Suit. At one point, Lake was mistaken for Wetton by Wetton's long-lost minion Ian. After the collapse of the Rainbow Mist, Lake was defeated by Roronoa Zora and Nico Robin and arrested by a mature Rapanui Pasqua's Marine crew. Lake is voiced by Tetsu Inada in the original Japanese version. In the English dub, Lake is voiced by Tom Wayland in the 4Kids dub and by Vic Mignogna in the Funimation dub.
- Ian (イアン, Ian): A member of the Wetton Pirates who got trapped in the Rainbow Mist with Rapanui Pasqua and his Pumpkin Pirates. He is later freed from the Rainbow Mist and arrested by the Marines. Ian is voced by Masaya Takatsuka in the original Japanese version. In the English dub, Ian is voiced by Ian Sinclair in the Funimation dub.
- Henzo (ヘンゾ, Henzo): An elderly scientist on Ruluka. As a child, he was a friend of Rapanui Pasqua and his Pumpkin Pirates until they and Wetton's minion Ian got trapped in the Rainbow Mist. As an adult, he received funding from Wetton on researching the Rainbow Mist. Henzo is voiced by Chō in the original Japanese version and by Masumi Kageyama as a child. In the English dub, he is voiced by Eric Stuart in the 4Kids dub while the Funimation dub had him voiced by R. Bruce Elliott as an adult and by Luci Christian as a child.
- The Collection Party (徴収隊, Chōshū-tai): A tax-collecting group led by Flip. Following the arrest of Wetton, Flip, and Lake, the Collection Party was disbanded.
- The Dynamo Team (ダイナモ部隊, Dainamo Butai): A group charged with pumping power into the mecha suits worn by Wetton and Lake. Following the arrest of Wetton, Flip, and Lake, the Dynamo Team was disbanded.

=== Hyokaido ===
Hyokaido (氷街道, Hyōkaidō) is an anime-exclusive location in Paradise that was visited by the Straw Hat Pirates following their leaving from Water 7. It is a frigid land with moving icebergs.

- Accino (アッチーノ, Atchīno): A bounty hunter, the leader of a family of bounty hunters called the Accino family, and the main antagonist of the anime-exclusive Ice Hunter arc. He ate the Hot-Hot Fruit, which enables him to raise his body temperature, with his highest temperature being 10,000 degrees. Accino is voiced by Tomomichi Nishimura in the original Japanese version and by Ray Gestaut in the Funimation dub.
- Campacino (カンパチーノ, Kanpachīno): A buff man who is the first son of Accino, the twin brother of Brindo, and a member of the Accino family. He has more authority over the family business than the rest of his siblings. Campacino is voiced by Taiki Matsuno in the original Japanese version and by Chris Rager in the Funimation dub.
- Brindo (ブリンド, Burindo): A buff man who is the second son of Accino, the twin brother of Campacino, and a member of the Accino family. He can perform a Combination Play move with Campacino. Brindo is voiced by Kōichi Tōchika in the original Japanese version and by Chris Rager in the Funimation dub.
- Hockera (ホッケラ, Hokkera): The third son of Accino and a member of the Accino family. He dresses like a hockey player and is the trickster of the group. Hockera is voiced by Takuma Suzuki in the original Japanese version and by Zach Bolton in the Funimation dub.
- Arbell (アルベル, Aruberu): The first daughter of Accino and a member of the Accino family. She is a figure skate. Arbell is voiced by Yūko Nagashima in the original Japanese version and by Carli Mosier in the Funimation dub.
- Salchow (サルコー, Sarukō): The husband of Arbell and a member of the Accino family. He is a male figure skater. Salchow is voiced by Katsuyuki Konishi in the original Japanese version and by Kyle C. Jones in the Funimation dub.
- Lil (リル, Riru): The second daughter of Accino, the younger sister of Arbell and the youngest member of the Accino family. While she has taken a liking to Nico Robin, she and her brother-in-law Salchow do not get along very well. Lil is voiced by Katsue Miwa in the original Japanese version and by Kara Edwards in the Funimation dub.

=== Little East Blue ===
Little East Blue (リトル・イーストブルー, Ritoru Īsuto Burū) is an anime-exclusive island in Paradise that is inhabited by settlers from East Blue.

- Fabre (ファブル, Faburu): A stout older man who is the Mayor of Little East Blue. Fabre is voiced by Yasuo Muramatsu in the original Japanese version and by Bradley Campbell in the Funimation dub.
- Yoko (ヨーコ, Yōko): A young girl who takes up the job of her deceased father Ryudo as the protector of the Little East Blue. She wears a Navy cape and cap, which belonged to her father. After she met Boss, she became friends with the beetle and they have been protecting Little East Blue ever since. Yoko is voiced by Mari Yaguchi in the original Japanese version and by Mikaela Krantz in the Funimation dub.
- Boss (ボス, Bosu): A gigantic Kaen Kabuto who was a creation of Dr. Indigo made only for the destruction of East Blue, but escaped to the Little East Blue were after befriending Yoko. He protects the island along with her. Originally having a brown exoskeleton while trying to save Little East Blue from the Amigo Pirates, his skin suddenly sheds, turning him dark blue.

== Video game characters ==
This section lists the characters who appeared in the One Piece video games.

=== Great Hidden Treasure of the Nanatsu Islands ===
The following are characters who appear in the 2002 RPG video game One Piece: Great Hidden Treasure of the Nanatsu Islands:

- Simon (サイモン, Saimon): The leader of the Simon Pirates and the main antagonist of One Piece: Great Hidden Treasure of the Nanatsu Islands. He ate the Paper-Paper Fruit which enables him to generate, control, and become paper. During a fight with the Straw Hat Pirates, Simon would get eaten by the ancient monster Shushibaruba and assume the form that resembles him. When Shushibaruba was destroyed, it can be assumed that Simon died as well.

=== Ocean's Dream! ===
The following are characters who appear in the 2003 RPG video game One Piece: Ocean's Dream!, which served as the inspiration to the anime-exclusive Ocean's Dream arc:

- Noko (ノコ): A seahorse who ate the Sleep-Sleep Fruit which enables him to trap people in a dream world and steal their memories while they slept enough to grow larger. Noko was sent flying far way to the sky by Luffy's attack. Noko is voiced by Keiichi Sonobe in the original Japanese version of the anime and by Cris George in the Funimation dub of the anime.
- Drim (ドリム, Dorimu): A boy who was controlled by Noko. When Luffy defeated Noko, Drim lost all memory of Noko and reunited with his mother. In One Piece: Stampede, Drim made a cameo at the Pirates Festival. Drim is voiced by Chinami Nishimura in the original Japanese version of the anime and by Mary Morgan in the Funimation dub of the anime.

=== Chopper's Big Adventure ===
The following are characters who appear in the 2003 video game One Piece: Chopper's Big Adventure:

- Raccoon (ラクーン, Rakūn): A boy who grew up in the same village with his scientist grandfather. When Raccoon became a scientist, he took over his grandfather's experiments and worked on one that would place animal traits onto humans. This process went awry, giving Raccoon raccoon-like traits.
- Fang (ファング, Fangu): The brother of Raccoon. Raccoon's experiments inadvertently transformed Fang into a wolf-like form.
- Edamame (エダマメ, Edamame): One of the scientists who worked with Raccoon and Fang. Raccoon's experiments inadvertently transformed Edamame into a wild boar-like form.
- Azuki (アズキ, Azuki): One of the scientists who worked with Raccoon and Fang. Raccoon's experiments inadvertently gave Azuki the ears and snout of a pig.
- Daizu (ダイズ, Daizu): A man with messy orange hair who is one of the scientists that worked with Raccoon and Fang. Raccoon's experiments inadvertently gave Daizu the ears and snout of a pig.
- Josephine (ジョセフィーヌ, Josefīnu): A massive lizard that Azuki takes care of.

=== Unlimited Cruise ===
The following are characters who appear in the 2008 and 2009 video games of One Piece: Unlimited Cruise:

- Gaburi (ガブリ): Is an animated Orb, brought to life by the Great Tree, who accompanies the Straw Hats on their journey. In The Treasure Beneath the Waves, Gaburi appears as a small demon, while in Awakening of a Hero, he returns in an angelic form. Gaburi is voiced by Rie Kugimiya in the original Japanese version.
- Doom Guardian (裁きの番人, Sabaki no Ban'nin): Is an entity created by the Great Tree by transforming Gaburi, whom the Straw Hats confront in The Treasure Beneath the Waves. It later returns in Awakening of a Hero, where it is transformed into the Demon of Doom (滅びの鬼神, Horobi no Kijin), being more powrful.

=== Unlimited World Red ===
The following are characters who appear in the 2013 video game One Piece: Unlimited World Red:

- Patrick Redfield (パトリック・レッドフィールド, Patorikku Reddofīrudo): Also known just as Red (レッド, Reddo), is a pirate who appears as the main antagonist of Unlimited World Red. Patrick consumed the Bat-Bat Fruit: Model Vampire which enables him to transform into a vampire, fly, and drain the life force out of others. When Luffy defeats Patrick, he returns the life forces to his victims and allows the Straw Hat Pirates to leave. Patrick Redfield is voiced by Masachika Ichimura in the original Japanese version of the video game's normal version and by Kazuhiro Yamaji in the original Japanese version of the video game's deluxe version.
- Pato (パト): A pen owned by Patrick Redfield that "ate" the Dog-Dog Fruit: Model Bake-danuki, which enables it to transform into a bake-danuki and create illusionary clones. Pato is voiced by Tarako in the original Japanese version.

=== One Piece Odyssey ===
The following characters appear in the 2023 video game One Piece Odyssey:

- Lim (リム, Rimu): A mysterious girl that lives on Waford, with special abilities that allow her to materialize others' skills and power as cubes whenever she touches someone. Lim is voiced by Marika Kōno in the original Japanese version.
- Adio Suerte (アディオ゠スエルテ, Adio Suerute): The main antagonist of One Piece Odyssey and the last member of the Wandering Clan from the former sky island Waford. He ate the Grab-Grab Fruit which enables him to summon large gauntlets to grab and control anything. Adio Suerte is voiced by Masaya Matsukaze in the original Japanese version.

== Reception ==
Allen Divers of Anime News Network comments that the male character designs of One Piece are "often quite varied and unique", while the female ones become "a bit repetitive". He also notes that, as the characters are "defined by what they seek", there is little room "for actual development". Todd Douglass Jr. of DVD Talk simply states that the series' characters have a lot of "charm". His colleague Carl Kimlinger describes the visual style of One Piece as "unconventional" with "grotesquely exaggerated expressions, simple eyes, big mouths and bigger teeth", "supremely ugly supporting characters and skinny, gangly-limbed main cast" and comments that "it's all amazingly distinctive, utterly appropriate, and surprisingly cool—in a goofy kind of way". He also notes that "Funimation's English dub is light-years better than the 4Kids debacle", "unusually accurate, professional, and largely enjoyable, which is far, far more than can be said of the previous dub". He laments that Funimation's version of "Crocodile loses his sepulchral charisma" and that "the original's fine dance on the edge of mawkish sentimentality is disrupted often enough by less-than-stellar acting". He also states that "Colleen Clinkenbeard's Luffy is more a generic spunky kid than a personality in his own right, really coming to life only during the action scenes during which she does a fine job of being darned cool."

Dustin Somner of Blu-ray.com comments that the Japanese and Funimation voice-acting is "fairly good, but not exceptional" and sometimes "overly zany". Todd Douglass Jr. of DVD Talk notes "the daunting cast of characters, both good and bad" as "one of the appealing factors" of the anime, but also comments that "Some of the voices [of the 4Kids dub] were pretty irritating ... with a lot of high-pitches and over exaggerated speech." Brigitte Schönhense of Splashcomics comments that the "brilliant" (German: genial) flashbacks into the characters' pasts make them so "likeable and lovable" (German: "sympathisch und liebenswert") and that they are the manga's real strength. Mania Entertainment writer Jarred Pine comments that Oda's characters are "whacky" and that his "bizarre" character designs create "wonderful characterizations and personalities". He notes the "well illustrated" facial expressions and says that "it's the whacky characterizations and designs that makes One Piece its own". His colleague Bryce Coulter comments that "One Piece's bizarre character designs will keep your attention as they can be very random and often memorable. Not the prettiest, but it will definitely capture your attention."
