= Mahito Ohba =

Japanese voice actor

- 大場 真人
- Born: Hokkaidō, Japan
- Occupations: Voice actor and narrator
- Agent: Aoni Production

Mahito Ohba (大場 真人, Ōba Mahito) is a Japanese voice actor and narrator. He is a graduate of Tamagawa University and is affiliated with Aoni Production.

Ohba is most known for the roles of Announcer Yoshigai in Ultimate Muscle (Kinnikuman Nisei), the narrator and Smoker (second voice) in One Piece, and Wolf O'Donnell in Star Fox: Assault and Super Smash Bros. Brawl.

== Filmography ==
=== Anime television series ===
- Aoki Densetsu Shoot! (1993) (Announcer)
- Gulliver Boy (1995) (Narration)
- H2 (1995) (Announcer)
- GeGeGe no Kitaro (4th series) (Kobayashi)

1989

- Kariage-kun - Doctor

1999

- One Piece - Smoker (2nd Voice), Pandaman, Sapi, Pagaya, Big Pan, Bas, Guile, Ryudo, Narration, Sancrin, Yamakaji, Roche

2000

- Legendary Gambler Tetsuya - Man A

2002

- Witch Hunter Robin - Akio Kurosawa
- Kinnikuman Nisei - Narration, Announcer, Geronimo, Gorgeousman, Canadian Boy, Gankyu

2005

- Doraemon - Yoshio Minamoto (Shizuka's Dad)

2008

- GeGeGe no Kitaro (5th series) - Old man at Izakaya, Muddy Boy
- Hakaba Kitaro - Underground Mizuki

2010

- Kaidan Restaurant - House Owner

2014

- Marvel Disk Wars: The Avengers - T'Challa / Black Panther

2017

- Marvel Future Avengers - T'Challa / Black Panther

2024

- Pokémon Horizons: The Series - Krabel

2026

- Hell Teacher: Jigoku Sensei Nube - Kirin

Unknown date

- Brain Powered - Firefighter
- Chō Mashin Eiyūden Wataru - Hoshio
- Cho Mashin Hero Wataru - Hoshio
- Chūka Ichiban - Junshin
- Danshi Koukousei no Nichijou - RPG Narrator
- Kindaichi Case Files - Yuichiro Hayami, Toyohiro Soga
- Marmalade Boy - Takemura Producer
- Record of Lodoss War: Chronicles of the Heroic Knight - Hoppu, Narration
- Shinken Densetsu Tight Road - Klaus Dagattsu
- Slam Dunk - Judo Staff
- Yu-Gi-Oh! - Yellow Spider Jiro

=== Original video animation (OVA) ===
- Mobile Suit Gundam: The 08th MS Team (xxxx) - Gau Pilot
- Suika (xxxx) - Alchimedis
- One Piece Film: Strong World (xxxx) - Narration

=== Original net animation (ONA) ===
- Koisuru One Piece (2025) - Narrator

=== Anime film ===
- Kindaichi Case Files: The New Opera House Killer (xxxx) - Seiji Makube
- Kinnikuman Nisei series (xxxx-xx) - Announcer
- Memories (1995) - Voice
- One Piece film series (2000–present) - Narration
- Sailor Moon R: The Movie (1993) - Newscaster

=== Tokusatsu ===
- Heisei Ultra Seven (xxxx) - Alien Valkyrie

=== Video games ===
2004

- Ace Combat 5: The Unsung War - AWACS Thunderhead

2005

- Castlevania: Curse of Darkness - Dracula
- Star Fox Assault - Wolf O'Donnell
- Tales of Legendia - Stingle/Arnold Alcott

2007

- Bladestorm: The Hundred Years' War - Philip Lu Bon

2008

- Super Smash Bros. Brawl - Wolf O'Donnell

2011

- Warriors Orochi 4 - Hundun

2013

- Warriors Orochi 3 Ultimate - Hundun

2018

- Warriors Orochi 4 - Hundun

Unknown date

- Blood+ Final Piece (Guy)
- Fragile: Sayonara Tsuki no Haikyo
- Gungrave O.D. (Don Corceone)
- JoJo'S Bizarre Adventure: Phantom Blood (Narration)
- Kinnikuman series
  - Kinnikuman Nisei: New Generation vs. Legends (Announcer, Pandaman)
  - Kinnikuman Generations (Geronimo, Announcer)
  - Kinnikuman Muscle Generations (Geronimo, Announcer)
  - Kinnikuman Muscle Grand Prix MAX (Geronimo, Planet Kinniku Soldier)
  - Kinnikuman Muscle Grand Prix 2 (Geronimo)
- Gurumin: A Monstrous Adventure (Motoro)
- Kessen series
  - Kessen II (Gan Ning, Liu Zhang)
  - Kessen III (Mori Yoshinari, Miyoshi Masayasu)
- Metal Angel 3 (Carlos Ozaki)
- One Piece series
  - Fighting for One Piece (Smoker)
  - One Piece: Gear Spirit (Smoker)
  - One Piece: Grand Battle! (Narration, Pandaman)
  - One Piece: Grand Battle! 2 (Narration, Smoker, Pandaman)
  - One Piece: Grand Battle! 3 (Smoker, Pandaman, Pagaya)
  - One Piece: Oceans Dream! (Smoker Pandaman)
  - One Piece: Pirates' Carnival (Smoker, Pandaman)
  - One Piece: Treasure Battle! (Smoker, Pandaman)
  - One Piece: Unlimited Adventure (Smoker)
- Private Eye Dol (Jirō Tachibana)
- Sakigake!! Otokojuku (Zeus)
- Spiritual Soul (Gurasu)
- Tales of Innocence (Ruka's father)

=== Dubbing roles ===
- Against the Ropes, Luther Shaw (Omar Epps)
- Mighty Joe Young, Professor Gregory O'Hara (Bill Paxton)
