= List of One Piece video games =

One Piece video games
- Genres: Action-adventure, fighting, role-playing
- Developer: Various
- Publishers: Bandai; Bandai Namco Entertainment
- Composer: Various
- Platforms: WonderSwan, PlayStation, Game Boy Color, WonderSwan Color, Game Boy Advance, PlayStation 2, GameCube, Wii, Nintendo DS, PlayStation Portable, Nintendo 3DS, Nintendo Switch, Nintendo Switch 2, PlayStation 3, Wii U, PlayStation 4, PlayStation 5, PlayStation Vita, Windows, iOS, Android, Xbox One, Xbox Series X/S, PlayStation VR
- First release: From TV Animation - One Piece: Become the Pirate King! July 19, 2000
- Latest release: One Piece Odyssey; January 13, 2023
- Parent series: One Piece

The One Piece video games are based on Eiichiro Oda's manga its anime adaptation of the same name. Most games are published by Bandai Namco Entertainment, formerly Bandai and Banpresto. The games take place in the fictional world of One Piece, and the stories revolve around the adventures of Monkey D. Luffy and his Straw Hat Pirates, the franchise's protagonists.

Games have been released for many home video game consoles, handheld game consoles, and mobile phones. The series features various genres, mostly role-playing games (the predominant type in the series' early years) and fighting games, such as the games in the Grand Battle! sub-series. The series contains 56 games including 11 mobile games, not counting appearances in crossover entries.

== Overview ==
The video game series debuted in Japan on July 19, 2000, with From TV Animation – One Piece: Become the Pirate King! (One Piece: Mezase Kaizoku Ou!) for the Bandai WonderSwan Color handheld game console. More than five years after the video game series debuted in Japan, One Piece: Grand Battle! Rush was the first One Piece video game to be localized and released in North America, on September 7, 2005, for Nintendo GameCube. Out of 38 games (not including non-Japanese games), 11 have been released in North America, two in Australia, and 13 in Europe.

Summary of One Piece video game releases
Title	Genre(s)	Year					System(s)
Title	Genre(s)	JP	NA	EU	AU	CN	System(s)
Pirate King	Strategy	2000	No	No	No	No	WSC
Dream Pirate Crew	RPG	2001	No	No	No	No	GBC
Grand Battle	Fighting	2001	No	2003	No	No	PS1
Set Sail Pirate Crew	RPG	2001, 2003	No	No	No	No	PS1
Rainbow Island	RPG	2001	No	No	No	No	WSC
Treasure Wars	Boardgame	2002	No	No	No	No	WSC
Grand Battle 2	Fighting	2002	No	No	No	No	PS1
Grand Line Dream Adv	RPG	2002	No	No	No	No	GBC
Grand Battle Swan	Fighting	2002	No	No	No	No	WSC
Treasure Battle	Party	2002	No	No	No	No	GC
Nanatsu Islands	RPG	2002	No	No	No	No	GBA
Treasure Wars 2	Boardgame	2002	No	No	No	No	WSC
Berry King	Boardgame	2003	No	No	No	No	GBA
Ocean's Dream	RPG	2003	No	No	No	No	PS1
Chopper's Big Adventure	RPG	2003	No	No	No	No	WSC
Grand Battle 3	Fighting	2003	No	No	No	No	PS2, GC
Going Baseball	Sports	2004	No	No	No	No	GBA
Round the Land	Action-Adventure	2004	No	2004	No	No	PS2
Grand Battle Rush	Fighting	2005	2005	2005	No	No	PS2, GC
Dragon Dream	Boardgame	2005	No	No	No	No	GBA
One Piece	Action-Adventure	No	2005	No	No	No	GBA
Fighting for One Piece	Fighting	2005	No	No	No	No	PS2
Pirates' Carnival	Party	2005	No	No	No	No	PS2, GC
Grand Adv	Fighting	No	2006	2006	2006	No	PS2, GC
Unltd Adv	Action, Adventure, Fighting	2007	2008	No	No	No	Wii
Gear Spirit	Fighting	2007	No	No	No	No	DS
Unltd Cruise: Ep 1	Action, Adventure, Fighting	2008	No	2009	2009	No	Wii
Unltd Cruise: Ep 2	Action, Adventure, Fighting	2009	No	2009	No	No	Wii
Title	Genre	Year					System(s)
Title	Genre	JP	NA	EU	AU	CN	System(s)
Gigant Battle	?	2010	No	2011	No	No	DS
Unltd Cruise SP	Action, Adventure, Fighting	2011	No	No	No	No	3DS
Gigant Battle 2	?	2011	No	No	No	No	DS
Grand Collection	Social-network	2012	No	No	No	No	iOS, Android
Pirate Warriors	Action-adventure, Beat 'em up	2012	2012	2012	No	No	PS3
Romance Dawn	RPG	2012	2014	2013	No	No	PSP, 3DS
Pirate Warriors 2	Action-adventure, Beat 'em up	2013	2013	2013	No	No	PS3, Vita
Moja	?	2013	No	No	No	No	iOS, Android
Straw Wars Pirate Defense	Tower defense	2013					iOS, Android
Unltd World Red	Action, Adventure, Fighting	2013	2014				3DS
Unltd World Red	Action, Adventure, Fighting	2014					PS3, Vita, Wii U
Unltd World Red	Action, Adventure, Fighting	2017			No	No	PS4, Switch, Win
Running Chopper	?	2013					iOS, Android
Super Grand Battle X	Fighting	2014	No	No	No	No	3DS
Treasure Cruise	Turn-based	2014	2015				iOS, Android
Grand Quiz Battle	?	2014					iOS, Android
Set Sail	?	No	No	No	No	2015	iOS, Android
Pirate Warriors 3	Action-adventure, Beat 'em up	2015			No	No	PS3, PS4, Vita, Win
Pirate Warriors 3	Action-adventure, Beat 'em up	2017	2018		No	No	Switch
Run, Chopper, Run!	?	2015					iOS, Android
Road of the Strong	?	No	No	No	No	2016	iOS, Android
Thousand Storm	?	2016	2017			No	iOS, Android
Burning Blood	Fighting	2016	2016	2016	No	No	PS4, Vita, XBO, Win
Great Pirate Colosseum	Action, Fighting	2017	No	No	No	No	3DS
Bounty Rush	Action	2018, 2019					iOS, Android
Grand Cruise	?	2018					PS4 (PSVR)
Burning Will	RPG	No	No	No	No	2018	iOS, Android
World Seeker	Action-adventure	2019					PS4, XBO, Win
Title	Genre	Year					System(s)
Title	Genre	JP	NA	EU	AU	CN	System(s)
Bon Bon Journey	?	2020					iOS, Android
Pirate Warriors 4	Action-adventure, Beat 'em up	2020					PS4, Switch, XBO, Win
The Voyage	?	No	No	No	No	2021	iOS, Android
Odyssey	RPG	2023, 2024 on Nintendo Switch					PS4, PS5, XBO, XSX, Win, NS

== Series ==
=== One Piece: Grand Battle! ===
Game	Details
From TV Animation – One Piece: Grand Battle! Original release date(s): JP: March 15, 2001; EU: February 26, 2003	Release years by system: 2001—PlayStation
From TV Animation – One Piece: Grand Battle! Original release date(s): JP: March 15, 2001; EU: February 26, 2003	Notes: Published by Bandai and developed by Ganbarion; Known in Europe as One Piece: Grand Battle!
From TV Animation – One Piece: Grand Battle! 2 Original release date(s): JP: March 20, 2002	Release years by system: 2002—PlayStation
From TV Animation – One Piece: Grand Battle! 2 Original release date(s): JP: March 20, 2002	Notes: Published by Bandai and developed by Ganbarion
From TV Animation – One Piece: Grand Battle Swan Colosseum Original release date(s): JP: July 12, 2002	Release years by system: 2002—WonderSwan Color
From TV Animation – One Piece: Grand Battle Swan Colosseum Original release date(s): JP: July 12, 2002	Notes: Published by Bandai and developed by Dimps
One Piece: Grand Battle! 3 Original release date(s): JP: December 11, 2003	Release years by system: 2003—GameCube, PlayStation 2
One Piece: Grand Battle! 3 Original release date(s): JP: December 11, 2003	Notes: Published by Bandai and developed by Ganbarion
One Piece: Grand Battle! Rush Original release date(s): JP: March 17, 2005; NA: September 7, 2005; EU: October 7, 2005	Release years by system: 2005—GameCube, PlayStation 2
One Piece: Grand Battle! Rush Original release date(s): JP: March 17, 2005; NA: September 7, 2005; EU: October 7, 2005	Notes: Published by Bandai and developed by Ganbarion; Known in the U.S. as One Piece: Grand Battle! and in Europe as Shonen Jump's One Piece: Grand Battle!.; Was a Virgin Megastores exclusive game in the UK and was on sale for limited time.; The GameCube version has not been released in Europe.
One Piece: Grand Adventure Original release date(s): NA: August 29, 2006; AU: December 8, 2006; EU: December 2006	Release years by system: 2006—GameCube, PlayStation 2
One Piece: Grand Adventure Original release date(s): NA: August 29, 2006; AU: December 8, 2006; EU: December 2006	Notes: Published by Namco Bandai Games under the Bandai brand and developed by Ganbarion; The GameCube version has only been released in North America.
One Piece: Super Grand Battle! X Original release date(s): JP: November 13, 2014	Release years by system: 2014—Nintendo 3DS
One Piece: Super Grand Battle! X Original release date(s): JP: November 13, 2014	Notes: Published by Bandai Namco Games; Features support for Nintendo's line of Amiibo figurines

=== One Piece: Unlimited ===
Game	Details
One Piece: Unlimited Adventure Original release date(s): JP: April 26, 2007; NA: January 22, 2008	Release years by system: 2007—Wii
One Piece: Unlimited Adventure Original release date(s): JP: April 26, 2007; NA: January 22, 2008	Notes: Published by Bandai Namco Games and developed by Ganbarion
One Piece: Unlimited Cruise: Episode 1 Original release date(s): JP: September 11, 2008; EU: June 19, 2009; AU: June 25, 2009	Release years by system: 2008—Wii
One Piece: Unlimited Cruise: Episode 1 Original release date(s): JP: September 11, 2008; EU: June 19, 2009; AU: June 25, 2009	Notes: Published by Bandai Namco Games and developed by Ganbarion
One Piece: Unlimited Cruise: Episode 2 Original release date(s): JP: February 26, 2009; EU: September 18, 2009	Release years by system: 2009—Wii
One Piece: Unlimited Cruise: Episode 2 Original release date(s): JP: February 26, 2009; EU: September 18, 2009	Notes: Published by Bandai Namco Games and developed by Ganbarion
One Piece Unlimited Cruise SP Original release date(s): JP: May 26, 2011; EU: February 10, 2012	Release years by system: 2011—Nintendo 3DS
One Piece Unlimited Cruise SP Original release date(s): JP: May 26, 2011; EU: February 10, 2012	Notes: Published by Bandai Namco Games and developed by Ganbarion
One Piece: Unlimited World Red Original release date(s): JP: November 21, 2013; NA: July 8, 2014; EU: June 27, 2014	Release years by system: 2013—Nintendo 3DS; 2014—PlayStation 3, PlayStation Vita, Wii U 2017— Nintendo Switch, PlayStation 4, Windows
One Piece: Unlimited World Red Original release date(s): JP: November 21, 2013; NA: July 8, 2014; EU: June 27, 2014	Notes: Published by Bandai Namco Games and developed by Ganbarion

=== One Piece: Pirate Warriors ===
Game	Details
One Piece: Pirate Warriors Original release date(s): JP: March 1, 2012; EU: September 21, 2012; NA: September 25, 2012	Release years by system: 2012—PlayStation 3
One Piece: Pirate Warriors Original release date(s): JP: March 1, 2012; EU: September 21, 2012; NA: September 25, 2012	Notes: Published by Bandai Namco Games and developed by Omega Force (Koei Tecmo)
One Piece: Pirate Warriors 2 Original release date(s): JP: March 20, 2013; EU: August 30, 2013; NA: September 3, 2013	Release years by system: 2013—PlayStation 3, PlayStation Vita
One Piece: Pirate Warriors 2 Original release date(s): JP: March 20, 2013; EU: August 30, 2013; NA: September 3, 2013	Notes: Published by Bandai Namco Games and developed by Omega Force (Koei Tecmo)
One Piece: Pirate Warriors 3 Original release date(s): JP: March 26, 2015; EU: August 28, 2015; NA: August 25, 2015	Release years by system: 2015—PlayStation 3, PlayStation 4, PlayStation Vita, Windows; 2018—Nintendo Switch
One Piece: Pirate Warriors 3 Original release date(s): JP: March 26, 2015; EU: August 28, 2015; NA: August 25, 2015	Notes: Published by Bandai Namco Entertainment and developed by Omega Force (Koei Tecmo)
One Piece: Pirate Warriors 4 Original release date(s): WW: March 27, 2020	Release years by system: 2020—Windows, Nintendo Switch, PlayStation 4, Xbox One 2025—Nintendo Switch 2, PlayStation 5, Xbox Series X/S
One Piece: Pirate Warriors 4 Original release date(s): WW: March 27, 2020	Notes: Published by Bandai Namco Entertainment and developed by Omega Force (Koei Tecmo)

== Other video games ==
Game	Details
From TV Animation – One Piece: Become the Pirate King! Original release date(s): JP: July 19, 2000	Release years by system: 2000—WonderSwan
From TV Animation – One Piece: Become the Pirate King! Original release date(s): JP: July 19, 2000	Notes: Published by Bandai and developed by Soft Machine
From TV Animation – One Piece: Birth of Luffy's Dream Pirate Crew! Original release date(s): JP: April 27, 2001	Release years by system: 2001—Game Boy Color
From TV Animation – One Piece: Birth of Luffy's Dream Pirate Crew! Original release date(s): JP: April 27, 2001	Notes: Published by Banpresto and developed by Alpha Unit
From TV Animation – One Piece: Set Sail Pirate Crew! Original release date(s): JP: August 2, 2001; JP: June 26, 2003 (PlayStation the Best)	Release years by system: 2001—PlayStation
From TV Animation – One Piece: Set Sail Pirate Crew! Original release date(s): JP: August 2, 2001; JP: June 26, 2003 (PlayStation the Best)	Notes: Published by Bandai and developed by Aim At Entertainment
From TV Animation – One Piece: Legend of the Rainbow Island Original release date(s): JP: September 13, 2001	Release years by system: 2001—WonderSwan Color
From TV Animation – One Piece: Legend of the Rainbow Island Original release date(s): JP: September 13, 2001	Notes: Published by Bandai and developed by Tomcat System
From TV Animation – One Piece: Treasure Wars Original release date(s): JP: January 3, 2002	Release years by system: 2002—WonderSwan Color
From TV Animation – One Piece: Treasure Wars Original release date(s): JP: January 3, 2002	Notes: Published by Bandai
From TV Animation – One Piece: Grand Line Dream Adventure Log Original release date(s): JP: June 28, 2002	Release years by system: 2002—Game Boy Color
From TV Animation – One Piece: Grand Line Dream Adventure Log Original release date(s): JP: June 28, 2002	Notes: Published by Banpresto and developed by Alpha Unit; Final game compatible with the original Game Boy and enhanced for the Super Game Boy to be released in Japan
From TV Animation – One Piece: Treasure Battle! Original release date(s): JP: November 1, 2002	Release years by system: 2002—GameCube
From TV Animation – One Piece: Treasure Battle! Original release date(s): JP: November 1, 2002	Notes: Published by Bandai and developed by BEC
From TV Animation – One Piece: Great Hidden Treasure of the Nanatsu Islands Original release date(s): JP: November 15, 2002	Release years by system: 2002—Game Boy Advance
From TV Animation – One Piece: Great Hidden Treasure of the Nanatsu Islands Original release date(s): JP: November 15, 2002	Notes: Published by Banpresto
From TV Animation – One Piece: Treasure Wars 2 Welcome to Buggyland Original release date(s): JP: December 20, 2002	Release years by system: 2002—WonderSwan Color
From TV Animation – One Piece: Treasure Wars 2 Welcome to Buggyland Original release date(s): JP: December 20, 2002	Notes: Published by Bandai
From TV Animation – One Piece: Aim! The King of Berry Original release date(s): JP: March 28, 2003	Release years by system: 2003—Game Boy Advance
From TV Animation – One Piece: Aim! The King of Berry Original release date(s): JP: March 28, 2003	Notes: Published by Banpresto
From TV Animation – One Piece: Ocean's Dream! Original release date(s): JP: May 1, 2003	Release years by system: 2003—PlayStation
From TV Animation – One Piece: Ocean's Dream! Original release date(s): JP: May 1, 2003	Notes: Published by Bandai; The basis for episodes 220-224 of the anime
From TV Animation – One Piece: Chopper's Big Adventure Original release date(s): JP: October 16, 2003	Release years by system: 2003—WonderSwan Color
From TV Animation – One Piece: Chopper's Big Adventure Original release date(s): JP: October 16, 2003	Notes: Published by Bandai
One Piece: Going Baseball Original release date(s): JP: March 11, 2004	Release years by system: 2004—Game Boy Advance
One Piece: Going Baseball Original release date(s): JP: March 11, 2004	Notes: Published by Bandai and developed by Now Production
One Piece: Round the Land Original release date(s): JP: July 29, 2004; EU: December 10, 2004	Release years by system: 2004—PlayStation 2
One Piece: Round the Land Original release date(s): JP: July 29, 2004; EU: December 10, 2004	Notes: Published by Bandai
One Piece: Dragon Dream Original release date(s): JP: April 28, 2005	Release years by system: 2005—Game Boy Advance
One Piece: Dragon Dream Original release date(s): JP: April 28, 2005	Notes: Published by Bandai; Remake of 2003´s Ocean's Dream for the PlayStation
One Piece Original release date(s): NA: September 7, 2005	Release years by system: 2005—Game Boy Advance
One Piece Original release date(s): NA: September 7, 2005	Notes: Published by Bandai and developed by Dimps; Awarded the title "GBA Platformer of the Year" in 2005 by GameSpy's network of game websites.
Fighting for One Piece Original release date(s): JP: September 8, 2005	Release years by system: 2005—PlayStation 2
Fighting for One Piece Original release date(s): JP: September 8, 2005	Notes: Published by Bandai and developed by Flat-Out
One Piece: Pirates' Carnival Original release date(s): JP: November 23, 2005; NA: September 12, 2006	Release years by system: 2005—GameCube, PlayStation 2
One Piece: Pirates' Carnival Original release date(s): JP: November 23, 2005; NA: September 12, 2006	Notes: Published by Bandai (later Namco Bandai Games) and developed by h.a.n.d. Inc.
One Piece: Gear Spirit Original release date(s): JP: August 30, 2007	Release years by system: 2007—Nintendo DS
One Piece: Gear Spirit Original release date(s): JP: August 30, 2007	Notes: Published by Bandai Namco Games and developed by Matrix Software
One Piece: Gigant Battle! Original release date(s): JP: September 9, 2010; EU: July 1, 2011	Release years by system: 2010—Nintendo DS
One Piece: Gigant Battle! Original release date(s): JP: September 9, 2010; EU: July 1, 2011	Notes: Published by Bandai Namco Games; An English version was only released in the UK
One Piece: Gigant Battle! 2 New World ワンピース ギガントバトル! 2 新世界 Original release date(s): JP: November 17, 2011	Release years by system: 2011—Nintendo DS
One Piece: Gigant Battle! 2 New World ワンピース ギガントバトル! 2 新世界 Original release date(s): JP: November 17, 2011	Notes: Published by Bandai Namco Games
One Piece: Romance Dawn Original release date(s): JP: December 20, 2012; EU: November 29, 2013; NA: February 11, 2014	Release years by system: 2012—PlayStation Portable, Nintendo 3DS
One Piece: Romance Dawn Original release date(s): JP: December 20, 2012; EU: November 29, 2013; NA: February 11, 2014	Notes: The PlayStation Portable version is Japan exclusive; Published by Bandai Namco Games and developed by Three Rings
One Piece: Burning Blood Original release date(s): JP: April 21, 2016; NA: May 31, 2016; EU: June 3, 2016	Release years by system: 2016—PlayStation 4, PlayStation Vita, Xbox One, Windows
One Piece: Burning Blood Original release date(s): JP: April 21, 2016; NA: May 31, 2016; EU: June 3, 2016	Notes: Published by Bandai Namco Entertainment and developed by Spike Chunsoft; The first One Piece video game to be released on an Xbox console
One Piece: Great Pirate Colosseum Original release date(s): JP: September 21, 2016	Release years by system: 2016—Nintendo 3DS
One Piece: Great Pirate Colosseum Original release date(s): JP: September 21, 2016	Notes: Published by Bandai Namco Entertainment; developed by Arc System Works.; Whilst a stand-alone game, a patch added support for local or online multiplayer, crossover cross-play between this title and Dragon Ball Z: Extreme Butōden.
One Piece Grand Cruise Original release date(s): JP: May 23, 2018; WW: May 22, 2018	Release years by system: 2018—PlayStation 4, PlayStation VR
One Piece Grand Cruise Original release date(s): JP: May 23, 2018; WW: May 22, 2018	Notes: Published by Bandai Namco Entertainment and developed by Spike Chunsoft; The first One Piece video game to be released for PlayStation VR
One Piece: World Seeker Original release date(s): JP: March 14, 2019; WW: March 15, 2019	Release years by system: 2019—PlayStation 4, Xbox One, Windows
One Piece: World Seeker Original release date(s): JP: March 14, 2019; WW: March 15, 2019	Notes: Published by Bandai Namco Entertainment and developed by Ganbarion; The first One Piece video game to feature an open world environment
One Piece Odyssey Original release date(s): January 13, 2023	Release years by system: 2023—PlayStation 4, PlayStation 5, Xbox One, Xbox Series X/S, Windows, 2024—Nintendo Switch
One Piece Odyssey Original release date(s): January 13, 2023	Notes: Developed by ILCA and published by Bandai Namco Entertainment; Soundtrack composed by Motoi Sakuraba
One Piece: Grand Gourmet Original release date(s): October 23, 2026	Release years by system: 2026—Nintendo Switch, Nintendo Switch 2, Steam, iOS, Android
One Piece: Grand Gourmet Original release date(s): October 23, 2026	Notes: Published by Bandai Namco Entertainment

== Mobile video games ==
Game	Details
One Piece Treasure Cruise Original release date(s): JP: May 12, 2014; WW: February 8, 2015	Release years by system: 2014—iOS, Android; 2015—iOS, Android
One Piece Treasure Cruise Original release date(s): JP: May 12, 2014; WW: February 8, 2015	Notes: Developed and published by Bandai Namco Games; One Piece game with the widest cast of playable characters.
One Piece: Set Sail Original release date(s): CHN: January 20, 2015	Release years by system: 2015—Android, iOS
One Piece: Set Sail Original release date(s): CHN: January 20, 2015	Notes: Developed by DeNA and published by Bandai Namco Entertainment; Available only in Chinese
One Piece: The Road of the Strong (航海王強者之路) Original release date(s): CHN: January 2016	Release years by system: 2016—Android, iOS
One Piece: The Road of the Strong (航海王強者之路) Original release date(s): CHN: January 2016	Notes: Published by CMGE; Available only in Chinese; Digital collectible card game (DCCG)
One Piece Thousand Storm Original release date(s): JP: April 21, 2016; WW: January 25, 2017	Release years by system: 2016—iOS, Android
One Piece Thousand Storm Original release date(s): JP: April 21, 2016; WW: January 25, 2017	Notes: Published by Bandai Namco Games; offers online co-op with the anime's most popular characters; Available only in Japanese, since as of December 14, 2018, Global version was shut down.
One Piece Bounty Rush Original release date(s): WW: March 29, 2018; WW: January 31, 2019	Release years by system: 2018—Android, iOS; 2019—Android, iOS
One Piece Bounty Rush Original release date(s): WW: March 29, 2018; WW: January 31, 2019	Notes: Developed by Sega and published by Bandai Namco Entertainment.; A PvP action game with up to 4 on 4 team battles
One Piece: Burning Will Original release date(s): CHN: September 20, 2018	Release years by system: 2018—Android, iOS
One Piece: Burning Will Original release date(s): CHN: September 20, 2018	Notes: Developed by Guangzhou Lingxi Interactive Entertainment and published by Bandai Namco Entertainment; Available only in Chinese; Turn-based RPG game
One Piece Bon! Bon! Journey! Original release date(s): WW: March 17, 2020	Release years by system: 2020—Android, iOS
One Piece Bon! Bon! Journey! Original release date(s): WW: March 17, 2020	Notes: Published by Bandai Namco Entertainment; First puzzle game in the franchise
One Piece: The Voyage / One Piece Fighting Path (航海王热血航线测试服) Original release date(s): CHN: April 23, 2021	Release years by system: Android, iOS
One Piece: The Voyage / One Piece Fighting Path (航海王热血航线测试服) Original release date(s): CHN: April 23, 2021	Notes: Developed by China Mobile Games and Entertainment Group Limited (CMGE) and published by Nuverse / ByteDance; Available only in Chinese; Action RPG game

=== Mobile games not in operation ===
Title	Release	Published by	Notes	Ref(s)
One Piece Grand Collection	2012	Namco Bandai Games	Social-network	
One Piece Straw Wars Pirates Defence		Namco Bandai Games	Tower defense	
One Piece Grand Quiz Battle	2014	Bandai Namco Games	RPG battle game with Quiz gameplay	
One Piece Moja!		Namco Bandai Games	Social-network	
One Piece Run, Chopper, Run!	April 4, 2014	Bandai Namco Entertainment		
One Piece Dance Battle	November 12, 2014	Bandai Namco Games		

== Related games that feature One Piece characters ==
Game	Details
Jump Super Stars Original release date(s): JP: August 8, 2005	Release years by system: 2005—Nintendo DS
Jump Super Stars Original release date(s): JP: August 8, 2005	Notes: Published by Nintendo and developed by Ganbarion; Features one stage and five playable characters from One Piece
Battle Stadium D.O.N Original release date(s): JP: July 20, 2006	Release years by system: 2006—GameCube, PlayStation 2
Battle Stadium D.O.N Original release date(s): JP: July 20, 2006	Notes: Published by Bandai Namco Games and developed by Eighting; Features three stages and six playable characters from One Piece
Jump Ultimate Stars Original release date(s): JP: November 23, 2006	Release years by system: 2006—Nintendo DS
Jump Ultimate Stars Original release date(s): JP: November 23, 2006	Notes: Published by Nintendo and developed by Ganbarion; Features one stage and six playable characters from One Piece
J-Stars Victory VS Original release date(s): JP: March 19, 2014; EU: June 26, 2015; NA: June 30, 2015	Release years by system: 2014—PlayStation 3, PlayStation Vita 2015—PlayStation 4
J-Stars Victory VS Original release date(s): JP: March 19, 2014; EU: June 26, 2015; NA: June 30, 2015	Notes: Published by Bandai Namco Games and developed by Spike Chunsoft.; Known in the U.S. and Europe as J-Stars Victory VS+; Features one stage and four playable characters from One Piece; The North America and Europe version has an additional Arcade Mode.
Jump Force Original release date(s): JP: February 14, 2019; WW: February 15, 2019	Release years by system: 2019—PlayStation 4, Xbox One, Windows
Jump Force Original release date(s): JP: February 14, 2019; WW: February 15, 2019	Notes: Published by Bandai Namco Entertainment and developed by Spike Chunsoft.; Features two stages and seven playable characters from One Piece
Roblox Original release date(s): WW: September 1, 2006	Release years by system: 2006—PlayStation 4, PlayStation 5, Xbox One, Windows, Mobile device, Meta Quest
Roblox Original release date(s): WW: September 1, 2006	Notes: Published and developed by Roblox Corporation.; Features two games themed around One Piece. In the first one "East Blue Brawls", you take on the role of the 5 members of Luffy's crew to fight endless hoards of enemies alongside 4 other players. Another game called "Grand Arena" has you fight 19 other players as One Piece characters and be the last one alive. There is also a side-game called "Netflix Next-World" which you can use to get One Piece themed items for your character.
Fortnite Original release date(s): WW: November 1, 2026	Release years by system: 2026—PlayStation 4, PlayStation 5, Xbox One, Xbox Series X and Series S, Nintendo Switch, Nintendo Switch 2, Windows, macOS, Mobile device
Fortnite Original release date(s): WW: November 1, 2026	Notes: Published and developed by Epic Games.; Monkey D. Luffy, Zoro, Sanji, Nami, Usopp, Buggy the Clown, Nico Robin, and Portgas D. Ace will be available as cosmetic outfits as part of the mini-season "Treasure Hunters."; Tony Tony Chopper will be available as a Sidekick.; The Going Merry ship will replace the Battle Bus.; Zoro’s Three Sword Style, Usopp’s slingshot, Luffy’s Gum-Gum Fruit, and Ace’s Flame-Flame Fruit will be available as abilities.
Rocket League Original release date(s): WW: November 1, 2026	Release years by system: 2026—Windows (Epic Games), Mac OS X (Epic Games), Linux (Epic Games), SteamOS, PlayStation 4, PlayStation 5, Xbox One, Xbox Series X and Series S, Nintendo Switch
Rocket League Original release date(s): WW: November 1, 2026	Notes: Published and developed by Psyonix.; New items based on the series will be available, such as Luffy’s Straw Hat Topper, Straw Hat Crew Boost, Going Merry Sea Trail, and One Piece Antenna.

== See also ==
- List of One Piece media
