= One Piece (video game) =

2005 video game

- Developer: Dimps Corporation
- Publisher: Bandai Games
- Series: One Piece
- Platform: Game Boy Advance
- Release: NA: September 7, 2005
- Genre: Beat 'em up
- Mode: Single-player

One Piece, also referred to as Shonen Jump's One Piece, is a side-scrolling beat 'em up game for the Game Boy Advance. It is based on the One Piece anime series. Developed by Dimps and published by Bandai America's games division, it was released on September 7, 2005. It is the only One Piece game to be released exclusively in North America, and the first of two to not see a release in Japan. Due to being an American-only title released while 4Kids Entertainment was involved in the dubbing and localization of the anime, there are a few discrepancies compared to the canon material, matching 4Kids' edits and changes of the anime.

== Plot ==
"Follow the adventures of Monkey D. Luffy and the Straw Hat Pirates and explore the Grand Line in search of the famed treasure, the "One Piece!" Use your stretchy Gum-Gum abilities to defeat marines and other pirates of the sea that you encounter on your journey!"

Similar to the first One Piece video game, One Piece: Become the Pirate King!, the main game covers the East Blue Saga.

== Gameplay ==
Control Monkey D. Luffy through platformer styled levels, with a one button masher combo system. Roronoa Zolo and other crew members can be used as summons and a total of 15 characters appear in the story mode. There are 12 different bosses, including Buggy the Clown and Chaser. Items that appear in the manga and anime are used as collectable treasure, which the player can revisit after initially clearing a stage. The stages also have interactive environment objects.

This game uses some assets from the WonderSwan Color game One Piece Grand Battle: Swan Colosseum, a Japan-only title.

== Reception ==
Reception

Aggregate scores
Aggregator	Score
GameRankings	72.30%
Metacritic	76/100

Review scores
Publication	Score
GameSpy	4/5
Nintendo Power	8/10

The game was met with positive to average reception upon release, as GameRankings gave it a score of 72.30%, while Metacritic gave it 76 out of 100.
