= From TV Animation - One Piece: Grand Battle! 2 =

2002 video game

One Piece: Grand Battle! 2
- Developer: Ganbarion
- Publisher: Bandai
- Series: One Piece; One Piece: Grand Battle!
- Platform: PlayStation
- Release: JP: March 20, 2002
- Genre: Action
- Modes: Single-player, multiplayer

One Piece: Grand Battle! 2 (Note: Japanese: ONE PIECE(ワンピース) グランドバトル！2, Hepburn: Wan Pīsu: Gurando Batoru! Tsu) is a Japan-exclusive fighting game for the PlayStation developed by Ganbarion and published by Bandai in 2002. It is the second game in the One Piece: Grand Battle! series and the seventh game to be based on the One Piece manga and anime. Similar to the first game, this game uses the song "We Are!" from the One Piece anime, but with different lyrics, which is known as "We Are! Super-EX ver.".

== Plot ==
After Luffy and his crew make it to the grand line, they are faced by an organization of bounty hunters called Baroque Works. This game covers the Alabasta Saga.

== Gameplay ==
Similar to the first game, two characters will duke it out in a 3D arena with items and obstacles. However, more characters, stages and features are added.

=== Returning characters ===
- Monkey D. Luffy
- Roronoa Zoro
- Nami
- Usopp
- Sanji
- Kuro
- Don Krieg
- Arlong

- Buggy
- Alvida
- Chaser
- Tashigi
- Vivi
- Pandaman
- Mihawk
- Shanks

=== New characters ===
- Tony Tony Chopper
- Miss All Sunday
- Wapol
- Karoo
- Portgas D. Ace
- Mr. 0 Crocodile
- Mr. 2 Bon Clay
- Mr. 3

=== Support characters ===
- Yasopp
- Benn Beckman
- Lucky Roo
- Jango
- Butchie and Siam
- Mr. 4

- Miss Merry Christmas
- Hatchan
- Kuroobi
- Chew
- Miss Doublefinger
- Mr. 1

- Kuromarimo
- Chess
- Chessmarimo
- Chaka
- Pell
- Gin

== Soundtrack ==
A CD featuring the game's music was released under the title, "One Piece Grand Battle! 2 Music and Song Collection."

== PocketStation ==
Another One Piece game was available with this game using the PocketStation portable device, it was a role-playing game taking place during the Alabasta arc with a new original character.

== Reception ==
The game sold 247,345 in its first week, with its lifetime sales, as of December 29, 2002, totaling at 545,506 copies in Japan, making it the best-selling original PlayStation game of the year.
