= From TV Animation - One Piece: Grand Battle! =

2001 video game

One Piece: Grand Battle!
- Japanese box art
- Developer(s): Ganbarion
- Publisher(s): Bandai
- Series: One Piece; One Piece: Grand Battle!
- Platform(s): PlayStation
- Release: JP: March 15, 2001; EU: June 23, 2003
- Genre(s): Fighting
- Mode(s): Single-player, multiplayer

From TV Animation - One Piece: Grand Battle! (Note: Japanese: From TV Animation ONE PIECE(ワンピース) グランドバトル！, Hepburn: Furomu Tībī Animēshon Wan Pīsu: Gurando Batoru!) is a Japanese fighting video game developed by Ganbarion and published by Bandai. It is the first game in the One Piece: Grand Battle series and the second game to be based on the One Piece manga and anime. This game's introduction uses the theme song "We Are!" (Note: ウィーアー!, Wī Ā!) from the One Piece anime.

== Plot ==
A boy named Monkey D. Luffy goes on a journey to become king of the pirates. During his journey he fights many foes and little by little gathers a strong and stable crew. This game is based on the East blue saga and Whiskey Peak Arc in the One Piece anime.

== Gameplay ==
=== Main game ===
The gameplay involves two characters fighting it out in a 3D arena with items and obstacles. Items can be used to help the player beat the other character and obstacles only get in the way of the characters. In Event Battle, once the player has beaten enough enemies, each character's rival will appear. Event Battle is completed when the rival is defeated.

=== Playable Characters ===
- Alvida
- Arlong
- Buggy
- Don Krieg
- Kuro
- Mihawk
- Monkey D. Luffy
- Nami
- Miss Wednesday
- Pandaman
- Roronoa Zoro
- Sanji
- Shanks
- Smoker
- Tashigi
- Usopp

== Reception ==
This game had gotten a Gold Reward at the PlayStation Awards 2002 since it had shipped over 600,000 copies after its first year.
