= One Piece: Become the Pirate King! =

2000 video game

- Japanese box art.
- Developer: Soft Machine
- Publisher: Bandai
- Director: Hisayasu Suzuki
- Producers: Yusuke Sasaki; Tsuneo Matsumoto
- Programmers: Kazuka Yamada; Yukiharu Kuroyanagi; Takashi Nomura
- Artists: Hajime Nara; Naoki Murata; Asuka Fujita
- Composer: Kenji Yamamoto
- Series: One Piece
- Platform: WonderSwan
- Release: JP: July 19, 2000
- Genre: Action/Strategy/Role-Playing
- Mode: Single-player

One Piece: Become the Pirate King! (ONE PIECE(ワンピース) めざせ海賊王！, Wan Pīsu: Mezase Kaizoku Ō!) is a Japan-exclusive Action/Strategy/Role Playing game for the WonderSwan. It is the first video game to be based on the manga One Piece and its anime adaptation.

== Plot ==
Gold Roger (ゴールド・ロジャー, Gōrudo Rojā), the king of the pirates had obtained wealth, fame and power from people all over the world. Before his execution, he announced that he had left his treasure, the One Piece, in a single place. Because of this, many pirates from all around the world set sail for the grand line. The time period was known as the "Great Pirate Era". Twenty years later a young man known as Monkey D. Luffy (モンキー･D･ルフィ, Monkī D. Rufi) finally sets out to sea. This game is based on the East Blue saga and the first One Piece film.

== Gameplay ==
=== Main game ===
The player must use playing cards to move around the area in order to reach a certain destination. the card contains the type of pathway and the number of spaces the player can move. Along the way are surprise enemy attacks which are dealt with by using a pathway to reach the opponent standing there and give damage to him/her of the ship itself. The player wins the battle if all three enemies are defeated or the enemy ship is destroyed.

=== Playable characters ===
- Monkey D. Luffy
- Roronoa Zoro
- Nami
- Usopp
- Sanji

=== Bosses ===
- Alvida
- Morgan
- Buggy
- Kuro
- Eldoraggo
- Don Krieg
- Arlong
- Smoker

== Reception ==
As of December 31, 2000 the game was reported to have sold 19,799 copies in Japan.
