= One Piece: World Seeker =

- Developer: Ganbarion
- Publisher: Bandai Namco Entertainment
- Director: Makoto Baba
- Producers: Chikako Yamakura; Koji Nakajima
- Designer: Tsuyoshi Sato
- Programmers: Minoru Sudo; Ryohei Yoshida
- Artist: Tsuyoshi Sato
- Writers: Katsuyuki Kuriyama; Eiichiro Oda
- Composer: Kohei Tanaka
- Series: One Piece
- Platforms: PlayStation 4; Windows; Xbox One; Google Stadia
- Release: JP: March 14, 2019 (PS4); WW: March 15, 2019
- Genre: Action-adventure
- Mode: Single-player

One Piece: World Seeker (Note: Wan Pīsu: Wārudo Shīkā (ONE PIECE(ワンピース): ワールドシーカー) in Japanese) is an action-adventure video game based on the manga series One Piece and its anime adaptation. Developed by Ganbarion and published by Bandai Namco Entertainment, the game is the first video game in the franchise to feature an open world environment. The game was released on March 15, 2019, for PlayStation 4, Windows, and Xbox One. Characters that appear in the game include the entire Straw Hat crew, Akainu, Kizaru, Kuma, Tashigi, Smoker, Sabo, Buggy, Rob Lucci, and Ichiji, Niji, and Yonji from Germa 66.

The game features the talents of One Piece anime producer Hiroki Koyama from Toei Animation, One Piece media supervisor Suguru Sugita from Shueisha, One Piece game supervisor Yuji Suzuki from Shueisha, and One Piece game producer Kōji Nakajima from Bandai Namco Entertainment.

== Gameplay ==
Screenshot of Luffy traversing in the open world environment

One Piece: World Seeker is an action-adventure game which puts players in the role of Monkey D. Luffy from a third-person perspective. One Piece World Seeker is set in the "Prison Island," which is located in the New World. The player will experience and wage battles in an open world environment which can be freely explored.

The game's combat features stealth elements and Luffy can use the Observation Haki to see enemies from behind walls. Techniques from the anime like Gum Gum Rocket which allows Luffy to easily traverse the world and Gum Gum Bazooka are also featured in the game.

The game also features three DLC packs featuring Roronoa Zoro, Sabo, and Trafalgar Law as playable characters.

== Development ==
On November 2, 2017, the game was announced under the codename Dawn and said to be an "unprecedented" game, later in December 2017, the game's Official title One Piece: World Seeker was revealed and at Jump Festa 2018 the Game's First Trailer was revealed and released on YouTube on December 18, 2017.

The One Piece: World Seeker original soundtrack album by Kohei Tanaka, comprising 56 soundtracks, was released on March 15, 2019. The theme song for the Japanese version is "Kimi no Moto e" (君のもとへ, "To You") by Ketsumeishi. The western version uses an original piece called "Road to Ichiban" instead due to licensing issues.

== Reception ==
Reception

Aggregate score
Aggregator	Score
Metacritic	PC: 51/100; PS4: 58/100; XONE: 65/100

Review scores
Publication	Score
Destructoid	4/10
Game Informer	8/10
Hardcore Gamer	70%
HobbyConsolas	70%
IGN	4.5/10
Jeuxvideo.com	65%
PlayStation Official Magazine – UK	60%
The Games Machine (Italy)	65%

The game received "mixed" reviews on all platforms, according to the review aggregation website Metacritic.

In Japan, the game debuted at number two on the charts, selling 51,039 units (PS4 version) in its opening weekend. In two weeks it sold 58,777 units (PS4 version). As of November 2022, World Seeker had sold 1 million copies worldwide.

=== Accolades ===
Despite the mixed reviews, the game was nominated for "Original Light Mix Score, Franchise" at the NAVGTR Awards.

== See also ==
- List of One Piece video games
