= One Piece: Unlimited Cruise =

2008 video games

- European Episode 1 cover art
- Developer: Ganbarion
- Publisher: Bandai Namco Games (Note: Released under the Bandai brand.)
- Series: One Piece
- Platforms: Wii, Nintendo 3DS
- Release: Episode 1: JP: September 11, 2008; EU: June 19, 2009; AU: June 25, 2009; Episode 2: JP: February 26, 2009; EU: September 25, 2009; AU: October 1, 2009
- Genre: Action-adventure
- Modes: Single-player, multiplayer

One Piece: Unlimited Cruise (Note: Japanese: ONE PIECE(ワンピース) アンリミテッドクルーズ, Hepburn: Wan Pīsu: Anrimiteddo Kurūzu) is a two-episode action-adventure video game developed by Ganbarion and published by Namco Bandai Games for the Wii, based on the One Piece manga and its anime adaptation. The game was released in two episodes which act as parts of a single story. The first episode, One Piece: Unlimited Cruise Episode 1 – The Treasure Beneath the Waves (Note: ONE PIECE(ワンピース) アンリミテッドクルーズエピソード1 波に揺れる秘宝, Wan Pīsu: Anrimiteddo Kurūzu Episōdo Wan – Nami ni Yureru Hihō) was released in Japan on September 11, 2008, followed by releases in Europe on June 19, 2009 and in Australia one week later. The second episode, One Piece: Unlimited Cruise Episode 2: Awakening of a Hero (Note: ONE PIECE(ワンピース) アンリミテッドクルーズエピソード2 目覚める勇者, Wan Pīsu: Anrimiteddo Kurūzu Episōdo Tsū - Mezameru Yūsha) was released in Japan on February 26, 2009, followed by Europe on September 25, and in Australia on October 1. Neither game was released in North America.

It was additionally released as One Piece Unlimited Cruise: Double Pack in Germany on June 25, 2010, which contains both games within separate boxes.

Another version of the game, containing both episodes, was released on the Nintendo 3DS in Japan as One Piece: Unlimited Cruise SP (Note: ONE PIECE(ワンピース) アンリミテッドクルーズ スペシャル, Wan Pīsu: Anrimiteddo Kurūzu Supesharu) on May 26, 2011. In Europe, this version was once again split into two releases, with episode 1 released as One Piece: Unlimited Cruise SP on February 10, 2012, and episode 2 as One Piece: Unlimited Cruise SP 2 on July 27, 2012.

Unlike its predecessor, One Piece: Unlimited Adventure, Unlimited Cruise was localised only in PAL regions and the PAL versions only have Japanese voices with multi-lingual subtitles (including English) instead of English voices. It was followed by a sequel, One Piece: Unlimited World Red, in 2013.

== Reception ==
Simon Parkin of Eurogamer rated the European release of One Piece: Unlimited Cruise SP as a 3 out of 10. Both Mark Reece of Nintendo Life and Ashton Raze of GameSpot rated that version as a 4 out of 10. Parkin commented that the Japanese version is "a repackaging of two previous Nintendo Wii titles – One Piece Unlimited Cruise 1: The Treasure Beneath The Waves and One Piece Unlimited Cruise 2: Awakening of a Hero – with some bits removed and some added"; however, the European version dropped "the entire second Episode from the package, a fact the publisher has kept cheekily quiet ahead of release", due to cartridge space concerns as this version included "five different language subs (all voice acting remains in Japanese)". Reece commented that it was "shame for European 3DS owners and One Piece fans alike" to receive "only half the content" that was included in the Japanese version. Parkin called it "a raw deal, especially considering the poor quality of the game that did make it onto the cartridge".

Parkin noted that the release "lacks care and attention" and that "the problems are more deep-rooted than those introduced by the localisation team". Reece felt that "One Piece fans might very well get a kick out of" narrative aspects of the game, "however, taking its incommodious take on 'action', uncompromisingly repetitive progression, occasional technical issues, forgettable plot or the fact that half of its intended content has been needlessly misplaced into account, the number of reasons to recommend a purchase of One Piece: Unlimited Cruise Special is woefully insufficient". Raze commented that "the good news for One Piece fans is that Unlimited Cruise really nails the characters and the vibe". Raze opined that "the character charm and endearment is here, but the rest of the game lets that aspect down". Raze also thought that the presentation needed more thought as "the subtitles are tiny, blurry, and difficult to read" in cutscenes and "coupled with the 3D effects, which are otherwise excellent, this can be a bit of an eye strain".
