= One Piece: Grand Battle! =

2005 video game

One Piece: Grand Battle! Rush
- European PS2 cover art
- Developer: Ganbarion
- Publisher: Bandai
- Series: One Piece; One Piece: Grand Battle!
- Platforms: GameCube, PlayStation 2
- Release: JP: March 17, 2005; NA: September 7, 2005; EU: October 7, 2005 (PS2)
- Genre: Fighting
- Modes: Single-player, multiplayer

One Piece: Grand Battle is a fighting game made in Japan based on the manga series One Piece and its anime adaptation. It is the fourth and final game in One Piece's Grand Battle series and the nineteenth One Piece video game released. The game was released in Japan as One Piece: Grand Battle! Rush. (Note: Japanese: ONE PIECE(ワンピース) グラバト！RUSH(ラッシュ), Hepburn: Wan Pīsu: Gurando batoru! Rasshu) The English version uses the intro from the 4Kids TV series.

== Plot ==
Much like the manga and anime it is based on, Monkey D. Luffy wants to take Gol D. Roger's place to become King of the Pirates. Together with his crew namely, Roronoa Zoro, Nami, Usopp, Sanji, Chopper, and Nico Robin are on a quest to search for the great treasure One Piece (Note: ひとつなぎの大秘宝(ワンピース), Wan Pīsu) and also to fulfill their own dreams. The story is based on the East Blue saga up to the Foxy's Return arc.

== Gameplay ==
There are four different modes in the game: Grand Battle, a one-player/two player mode that features unlocked fighters and stages; Story Mode, a mode that follows every character through the story; Training, a testing mode to test one's skill; and Tourney, a tournament mode that allows to select a character and fight in it and baseball mode.

=== Returning Characters ===
- Monkey D. Luffy
- Roronoa Zoro
- Nami
- Usopp
- Sanji
- Tony Tony Chopper
- Nico Robin
- Kuro
- Don Krieg
- Arlong
- Buggy
- Smoker/Chaser
- Mr. 0 Crocodile
- Mr. 2 Bon Clay
- Mihawk
- Shanks
- Enel

=== New Characters ===
- Foxy
- Aokiji

== Sequel ==
The Sequel of One Piece: Grand Battle entitled One Piece: Grand Adventure, which in Grand Adventure, you play along with 5 captains. Luffy is Easy, Buggy is Normal, Crocodile is Hard, Chaser/Smoker is Insane and especially Usopp is Pirate Panic (from level 40-100).

== Reception ==
Reception

Aggregate score
Aggregator	Score	
Aggregator	GameCube	PS2
Metacritic	67/100	69/100

Review scores
Publication	Score	
Publication	GameCube	PS2
1Up.com	B	B
Famitsu	27/40	27/40
GameSpot	N/A	6/10
GameSpy	4.5/5	4.5/5
GameZone	N/A	6.8/10
IGN	7/10	7/10
Nintendo Power	6.5/10	N/A
Nintendo World Report	5/10	N/A
Official U.S. PlayStation Magazine	N/A	3.5/5
X-Play	2/5	2/5

The game received "average" reviews on both platforms according to the review aggregation website Metacritic. In Japan, Famitsu gave both platforms a score of three sevens and one six for a total of 27 out of 40.

GameSpot awarded it a score of 6.0 out of 10, saying "Fans of the series will love One Piece's visuals but will be disappointed with just about every other aspect of the game." IGN awarded it 7 out of 10, saying "In the end, One Piece: Grand Battle is a fun game marred by a lack of innovation."

As of December 25, in Japan the game sold 88,058 units on the PlayStation 2 and 46,395 units on GameCube totaling 134,453 lifetime sales.
