= One Piece: Romance Dawn =

2012 video game

- Japanese PSP cover art, featuring "Red Haired" Shanks and Monkey D. Luffy
- Developer: Three Rings
- Publisher: Namco Bandai Games
- Series: One Piece
- Platforms: PlayStation Portable (PlayStation Store), Nintendo 3DS
- Release: PlayStation Portable: JP: December 20, 2012; Nintendo 3DS: JP: August 8, 2013; AU: November 28, 2013; EU: November 29, 2013; NA: February 11, 2014
- Genre: RPG
- Mode: Single-player

One Piece: Romance Dawn (ONE PIECE(ワンピース) ROMANCE DAWN(ロマンスドーン) 冒険の夜明け, Wan Pīsu: Romansu Dōn - Bōken no Yoake; "One Piece: Romance Dawn - Dawn of the Adventure") is a role-playing video game based on the One Piece manga series and its anime adaptation, released in Japan and other parts of Asia for the PlayStation Portable on December 20, 2012, via retail and the PlayStation Store. A port for the Nintendo 3DS was released in Japan on August 8, 2013, via retail and the eShop. It was also released in Europe on November 29, 2013, and February 11, 2014, in North America.

The game covers the first half of the series from Luffy's early adventures in the East Blue to the battle at Marineford.

== Gameplay ==
The game is an RPG; it uses turn-based battles and action commands that help guide the player. The player commands the protagonist Luffy and other characters that are in his crew. The characters level up, and the player can strengthen attacks by obtaining points. All characters and enemies are from the One Piece series and play the same roles as seen in the source material. Cutscenes are told in a manga style.

== Development ==
Namco Bandai Games announced in July 2012 that they would be developing their first One Piece game for the PSP, which would be pure RPG. The game features 30 minutes of newly animated cutscenes by Toei Animation. A port for the Nintendo 3DS was released on August 8, 2013. Namco Bandai Games announced the 3DS port would be released in Europe in November 2013, later revealing there are also plans to release the game in North America. The main theme song is Eternal Waves by Triplane member Hyoue Ebata, which is replaced with an original piece in the Western releases due to licensing issues.

== Reception ==
It has a score of 42% on Metacritic.

MyM gave the game a negative review, with a ranking of 3 out of 10. Reviewer Martin Wharmby wrote: "Hideous, slow, repetitive and downright boring, Romance Dawn does a disservice to the One Piece franchise when it should have excelled." GamesRadar gave the game 1.5/5 stars, citing barebones RPG elements and bland, maze-like environments.

IGN awarded it a score of 5.0 out of 10, saying "One Piece: Romance Dawn tries hard to tell the Straw Hats' story, but you'd be better off just watching the anime." Destructoid awarded it 4.5 out of 10, saying "If the presentation wasn't so horrible, One Piece: Romance Dawn would be a decent way for a JRPG fan to spend an afternoon after they've exhausted their library of other more innovative titles" Nintendo Life awarded it 3 out of 10, saying, "Frankly, it's difficult to ascertain who would glean any semblance of enjoyment from One Piece: Romance Dawn." Pocket Gamer awarded it 4 out of 10, saying "It's really difficult to tell who One Piece: Romance Dawn will disappoint more: long-time fans of the franchise or newcomers." Slant Magazine awarded it 1 out of five stars, saying "they've put forth a product so systematically undercooked as to make even the most unflappable One Piece zealots question their faithfulness."

== Gamestop Limited Edition ==
In November 2013, Namco Bandai Games America announced that One Piece: Romance Dawn would receive a limited edition release with a holographic packaging in the US and Canada at GameStop, Club Namco, and EB Canada. 16,800 limited edition versions of the game were produced. Due to the limited nature of the release, One Piece: Romance Dawn is difficult to find in retail stores.
