= One Piece Bounty Rush =

2018 video game

One Piece: Bounty Rush
- Developer: Sega
- Publisher: Bandai Namco Entertainment
- Producer: Tsunehiro Shibata
- Series: One Piece
- Engine: Unity
- Platforms: Android, iOS, Windows
- Release: March 29, 2018 (initial release); January 31, 2019 (re-release); Windows; September 25, 2024
- Genre: Action
- Modes: Multiplayer, Singleplayer

One Piece Bounty Rush is a 2018 free-to-play action game developed by Sega and published by Bandai Namco Entertainment. based on the One Piece franchise. The game is played in real-time with four player teams in battle mode, in which the team that has the most treasure at the end wins. Every battle takes place within a location from the One Piece series.

== Production and gameplay ==
The game is a collaboration between Bandai Namco Entertainment, developer Sega, One Piece author Eiichiro Oda, anime production studio Toei Animation, and the manga publisher Shueisha.

It was initially released on March 29, 2018 for Android and iOS platforms and was taken offline on April 10, 2018 for long-term maintenance and was later re-released with graphics and gameplay overhaul on January 31, 2019.

One Piece Bounty Rush has a team of four players competing against another team of four players in real-time, with each battlefield being based on a location within the One Piece series. The winner is whichever team has the most coins at the end of a battle. Players can enhance a character's level by collecting in-game items from either the story mode or a battlefield.

Each team has to hold more captured treasures than the enemy team to win. There are three types of character classes assigned to every character; Attackers, Defenders, and Runners. Attackers have high ATK with the objective of KOing as many enemies as possible; Defenders have high DEF with the objective of protecting the area around their team's captured treasure; Runners have high SPD with the objective of capturing the enemy's treasure. There are a variety of characters to choose from and each character has their own attacks. The attacks include a basic combo and special skills. When using a basic combo, the player has to attack whatever character is closest. Every point from claiming treasure gives the player a small bonus after the battle. When a basic combo is finished, the enemy is knocked down, but they have the ability to not be harmed while getting back up.

== Reception ==
The game's pre-launch test had one million players. On June 1, 2020, the game's Facebook page reported 20 million downloads.

Dave Aubrey, of Pocket Gamer, wrote, "I don't hate One Piece: Bounty Rush at all, but after getting a feel for how much effort would be required to level up characters and play with a larger variety, it's not something I want to return to." Dan M. Scarborough said in a Blue Moon Game review, "One Piece Bounty Rush is a shift from gacha style to a real-time PvP action game, which is quite a brave move. However, mere bravado is not enough for a game to succeed, a lesson many developers learned the hard way. This game is just not worthy of the effort you need to invest in order to have some reward."
