= From TV Animation - One Piece: Set Sail Pirate Crew! =

2001 video game

- Box art of One Piece: Set Sail Pirate Crew!
- Developer: Aim At Entertainment
- Publisher: Bandai
- Series: One Piece
- Platform: PlayStation
- Release: JP: August 2, 2001
- Genre: Role-Playing Game
- Mode: Single-player

From TV animation - One Piece: Set Sail Pirate Crew! (From TV animation ONE PIECE(ワンピース) とびだせ海賊団！, From TV Animation - Wan Pīsu: Tobidase Kaizoku-dan!) is a Japan-exclusive role-playing game published by Bandai for the PlayStation. It is the fourth game to be based on the One Piece manga and its anime adaptation. This game's introduction uses the theme song Believe from the One Piece anime.

== Plot ==
In story mode, Luffy and his gang of pirates go on a journey to find the treasure called "Inishie no Kakera".

== Gameplay ==
=== Starting a New Game ===
When a new game begins, Luffy will introduce himself and tell the player about the world of One Piece. The player will then create a three different characters (a hero and a male and female partner).

=== Hero Stat Types ===
Luffy Type: Buggy Type: Kuro Type: Krieg Type: Arlong Type:
Attack - 50 Attack - 40 Attack - 30 Attack - 50 Attack - 50
Defense - 40 Defense - 40 Defense - 30 Defense - 50 Defense - 40
Speed - 30 Speed - 30 Speed - 50 Speed - 10 Speed - 20

=== Male Partner Stat Types ===
Zoro Type: Sanji Type: Usopp Type: Gin Type: Chopper Type:
Attack - 50 Attack - 40 Attack - 20 Attack - 40 Attack - 30
Defense - 20 Defense - 30 Defense - 30 Defense - 20 Defense - 50
Speed - 30 Speed - 30 Speed - 50 Speed - 40 Speed - 20

=== Female Partner Stat Types ===
Nami Type: Alvida Type: Tashigi Type: Vivi Type: Kureha Type:
Attack - 50 Attack - 40 Attack - 20 Attack - 40 Attack - 40
Defense - 20 Defense - 30 Defense - 30 Defense - 20 Defense - 10
Speed - 30 Speed - 30 Speed - 50 Speed - 40 Speed - 50
