= Ganbarion =

Japanese video game company

Ganbarion Co., Ltd.
- Native name: ガンバリオン
- Industry: Video games
- Founded: August 13, 1999
- Headquarters: Chūō-ku, Fukuoka, Japan
- Key people: Chikako Yamakura
- Number of employees: 121
- Website: www.ganbarion.co.jp

Ganbarion (ガンバリオン; Ganbarion) is a Japanese video game company based in Fukuoka. Founded on August 13, 1999 by former Technosoft members, such as Chikako Yamakura, It develops games primarily for home consoles. Two of Ganbarion's major clients are Bandai Namco Entertainment and Nintendo. The company is best known for developing games based on One Piece, Jump Super Stars, Jump Ultimate Stars, as well as original titles like Pandora's Tower. Ganbarion also co-developed Wii Fit U in collaboration with Nintendo EAD.

The studio's name is an abbreviation of its former motto "Ganbari switch ON!"; ganbari is derived from the Japanese word ganbaru (頑張る), one meaning of which is "do your best".

== Games developed ==
- From TV Animation - One Piece: Grand Battle! (2001) (Japan and Europe only)
- From TV Animation - One Piece: Grand Battle! 2 (2002) (Japan only)
- Azumanga Donjara Daioh (2002) (Japan only)
- One Piece: Grand Battle! 3 (2003) (Japan only)
- Vattroller X (2004) (Japan only)
- One Piece: Grand Battle! Rush (2005) (Known as "Grand Battle" outside Japan)
- Jump Super Stars (2005)
- One Piece: Grand Adventure (2006) (North America and Europe only)
- Jump Ultimate Stars (2006)
- One Piece: Unlimited Adventure (2007) (Japan and North America only)
- One Piece: Unlimited Cruise Episode 1 (2008) (Japan and Europe only)
- One Piece: Unlimited Cruise Episode 2 (2009) (Japan and Europe only)
- One Piece: Gigant Battle (2010)
- Pandora's Tower (2011)
- One Piece: Unlimited Cruise SP (2011) (Japan and Europe only)
- One Piece: Gigant Battle 2 (2011) (Japan only)
- Issho ni Asobou! Dream Theme Park (2011) (Known as "Family Trainer: Magical Carnival" in Europe and "Active Life: Magical Carnival" in North America outside Japan)
- Wii Fit U (2013, co-developed with Nintendo EAD)
- One Piece: Unlimited World RED (2014)
- One Piece: Super Grand Battle! X (2014) (Japan only)
- World Trigger: Smash Borders (2015) (Japan only)
- Golondia (2015)
- Dragon Ball Fusions (2016)
- Kingdom Seven Flags (2016)
- Shurado (2017)
- One Piece: World Seeker (2019)
- Engawa Danshi to Kemono Tan (2021)
- Dragon Ball: Gekishin Squadra (2025)
