= Jump Force =

2019 video game

- Box art featuring (from left to right) Naruto Uzumaki, Monkey D. Luffy, and Son Goku
- Developer: Spike Chunsoft
- Publisher: Bandai Namco Entertainment
- Director: Toyokazu Sakamoto
- Producers: Hiroyuki Kaneko; Koji Nakajima
- Programmers: Akira Watanabe; Shigeru Saito; Yosuke Yoshida
- Artist: Satoshi Tsurumi
- Writers: Ryuichi Hitori; Yuuya Amano; Hiro Ito
- Composers: Takanori Arima; Zac Zinger; Chad Seiter; Alex Ruger; Jérôme Leroy
- Series: Shōnen Jump
- Engine: Unreal Engine 4
- Platforms: PlayStation 4; Xbox One; Windows; Nintendo Switch
- Release: PlayStation 4, Xbox One: JP: 14 February 2019; WW: 15 February 2019; Windows: WW: 15 February 2019; Nintendo Switch: JP: 27 August 2020; WW: 28 August 2020
- Genre: Fighting
- Modes: Single-player, multiplayer

Jump Force is a 2019 crossover fighting game developed by Spike Chunsoft and published by Bandai Namco Entertainment. It features characters from various manga series featured in Shueisha's Weekly Shōnen Jump anthology in celebration of the magazine's 50th anniversary. The game was released on February 14, 2019, in Japan for PlayStation 4 and Xbox One, and the following day worldwide in addition to Windows. A Nintendo Switch port was released worldwide on August 28, 2020.

The game received mixed reviews from critics, with criticism being directed towards its story, gameplay, and failure to deliver its promises upon launch. The game was delisted from all digital storefronts on February 8, 2022, with its online services shutting down on August 24, 2022.

== Gameplay ==
Jump Force is a 1-v-1 fighting game where the player controls a team of three characters from a selection of various manga series featured in the Weekly Shōnen Jump magazine. Players control one character at a time while the others are used as support, with players able to switch between them during battle. Combat functions similarly to the previous Jump fighting games, such as J-Stars Victory VS, Dragon Ball Xenoverse sub-series, Naruto: Ultimate Ninja Storm sub-series and One Piece: Burning Blood, with players moving around a 3D space and utilizing various combos and special moves to attack their opponents. The match ends when one team depletes the other's health bar.

== Premise ==
When the real world collides with many of the Shōnen Jump universes, humanity is invaded by the "Venoms", an army of mind-controlled villains led by Kane and Galena. In order to fight back, many heroes are recruited to join the "Jump Force" under the leadership of Director Glover and his AI partner Navigator. Though, a suspicious figure is using both the Jump Force and the Venoms as an attempt to gain a mysterious artifact and merge all worlds into one.

=== Plot ===
Frieza attacks New York City with an army of Venoms, being confronted by Son Goku; however, a stray laser blast from Frieza fatally wounds a civilian in the war zone. Trunks revives the civilian with a cybernetic device called an umbras cube, giving them the potential to be a hero like them. Frieza withdraws, allowing Goku and Trunks to take the civilian back to their HQ, where they are greeted by Director Glover. Glover explains that the manga worlds from "Jump" have somehow begun merging with the real world and using their own umbras cubes to turn evil-hearted humans into Venoms, forcing him to create the Jump Force to quell the threat; the organization consists of heroes from the "Jump" worlds, along with other people saved through the cubes.

The group is divided into Alpha, Beta and Gamma teams; Son Goku leads Alpha (along with Piccolo, Zoro and Gaara) to fight off the invading Venoms, Luffy leads Beta (along with Boa Hancock, Sanji, Boruto and later Vegeta) to reclaim the territory from the Venoms, while Naruto leads Gamma (along with Kakashi, Sasuke, Trunks and Sabo) for stealthy reconnaissance. The new hero, who serves as the game's player character, is asked to join one of the divisions to help repel the invasion. Light Yagami, whose Death Note lost its powers by the merging of worlds has also joined, secretly intent on restoring it.

The Jump Force discover other heroes being mind-controlled by umbras cubes charged with evil energy. They free the heroes and recruit them, taking the cubes for inspection, while the recruits join one of the three divisions. Team Alpha is joined by Ichigo Kurosaki, Rukia Kuchiki, Renji Abarai, Yusuke Urameshi, Pharoh Atem, and Asta, Team Beta is joined by Jotaro Kujo, Kenshiro, Ryo Saeba, Kenshin Himura, Kurapika and Izuku Midoriya and Team Gamma is joined by Pegasus Seiya, Dragon Shiryu, Gon Freeces, Killua Zoldyck, Hisoka Morow and Dai. Duplicates of the Jump villains made of the dark umbras cubes also appear, along with the real ones, adding to the confusion, including Frieza, Blackbeard, Kaguya Ōtsutsuki, Cell, Sosuke Aizen, Dio Brando, Toguro and Makoto Shishio.

After an amnesiac girl named Angela is rescued, several members of the Jump Force suddenly become possessed by evil auras during missions, leading them to suspect a traitor is among them. While Sanji is initially blamed, the culprit is revealed to be Angela, who is a disguise for the evil Galena. She steals the collected umbras cubes and gives them to her master Kane, a man seeking to wipe out humanity in revenge for the deaths of his family. The player pursues and defeats Kane, but Glover reveals himself as Prometheus, the true mastermind behind the merging of the worlds and Galena's true master, having used Kane to sow chaos across the worlds. Having outlived his usefulness, Galena seemingly kills Kane and proceeds to stall the heroes to allow Prometheus to continue his plans. The heroes defeat Galena, only for Prometheus to absorb her afterward.

The heroes confront Prometheus, who reveals himself to be a "keyman" charged with showing the real world the stories of "Jump", but grew tired of humanity's vices and attempts to merge the real and the Jump worlds together in order to guide humanity in the right direction. He steals the player's cube for its good energy, planning to use it to balance the evil energy he collected from the villains to become a god. The villains form a temporary truce with the heroes, while a still-alive Kane uses the last of his strength to give his cube to the player and Goku empowers them further with the energy from all of the Jump Force, allowing them to destroy Prometheus.

However, Prometheus's death does not separate the realities, leaving Earth still under threat from the Jump villains. At Trunks' suggestion, the player character becomes the new Jump Force director and continues to protect humanity. Meanwhile, Light finds an umbras cube left behind by Prometheus, planning to use its dark energy to re-power his Death Note.

== Characters ==
The game's launch roster features 40 playable characters from 16 series, with 14 additional characters available as downloadable content via Character Passes and three added as part of a free update for a total of 57 characters. In addition, players are allowed to create their own unique playable character, customizing them with abilities, outfits and accessories earned through gameplay.

=== Playable characters ===
Black Clover

- Asta

Bleach

- Ichigo Kurosaki
- Rukia Kuchiki
- Renji Abarai
- Sousuke Aizen
- Tōshirō Hitsugaya (DLC)
- Grimmjow Jaegerjaquez (DLC)
- Yoruichi Shihōin (DLC)

Boruto: Naruto Next Generations

- Boruto Uzumaki

City Hunter

- Ryo Saeba

Dragon Ball

- Son Goku
- Vegeta
- Trunks
- Piccolo
- Frieza
- Cell
- Majin Buu (DLC)

Dragon Quest: The Adventure of Dai

- Dai

Fist of the North Star

- Kenshiro

Hunter × Hunter

- Gon Freecss
- Killua Zoldyck
- Kurapika
- Hisoka Morow
- Biscuit Krueger (DLC)
- Meruem (DLC)

JoJo's Bizarre Adventure

- Jotaro Kujo
- DIO
- Giorno Giovanna (DLC)

My Hero Academia

- Izuku Midoriya
- All Might (DLC)
- Katsuki Bakugo (DLC)
- Shoto Todoroki (DLC)

Naruto

- Naruto Uzumaki
- Sasuke Uchiha
- Kakashi Hatake
- Gaara
- Kaguya Ōtsutsuki
- Madara Uchiha (DLC)

One Piece

- Monkey D. Luffy
- Roronoa Zoro
- Sanji
- Sabo
- Boa Hancock
- Blackbeard
- Trafalgar D. Water Law (DLC)

Rurouni Kenshin

- Himura Kenshin
- Shishio Makoto

Saint Seiya

- Pegasus Seiya
- Dragon Shiryū

Yu-Gi-Oh!

- Yugi Muto/Yami Yugi
- Seto Kaiba (DLC)

YuYu Hakusho

- Yusuke Urameshi
- Younger Toguro
- Hiei (DLC)

Original Jump Force characters

- Galena (ガレナ, Garena)
- Kane (カイン, Kain)
- Prometheus/"Director Glover" (プロメテウス/グラバー, Purometeusu/Gurabā)

=== Non-playable characters ===
Death Note

- Light Yagami
- Ryuk

Original Jump Force characters

- Navigator (ナビゲーター, Nabigētā)

== Development and release ==
Jump Force was developed by Spike Chunsoft and published by Bandai Namco. The game is using Unreal Engine 4, and was created in commemoration of the 50th anniversary of Weekly Shōnen Jump. Dragon Ball creator Akira Toriyama designed the original characters created for the game. Jump Force was announced at E3 2018 during Microsoft's press conference. It was released on February 14, 2019, for PlayStation 4 and Xbox One in Japan, and on February 15, 2019, in the West for the same platforms, as well as Windows. Collector's Editions for the PS4 and Xbox One versions were released the same day. A Nintendo Switch port was announced in April 2020. The Switch version, titled Jump Force Deluxe Edition, includes the downloadable content from the first Character Pass and was released worldwide on August 28, 2020.

== Discontinuation ==
On November 10, 2021, Bandai Namco announced the discontinuation of the game. It was delisted from digital stores along with its downloadable content on February 8, 2022, and the shutdown of its online server ranked matches happened 6 months later on August 24, 2022.

== Reception ==
Reception

Aggregate score
| Aggregator | Score |
|---|---|
| Metacritic | PC: 60/100; PS4: 56/100; XONE: 61/100; NS: 50/100 |

Review scores
| Publication | Score |
|---|---|
| Destructoid | 6/10 |
| Electronic Gaming Monthly | 6.5/10 |
| Game Informer | 6/10 |
| GamePro | 75/100 |
| GameSpot | 7/10 |
| GamesRadar+ | 3/5 |
| HobbyConsolas | 71/100 |
| IGN | 6.3/10 (English); 7.5/10 (Spanish) |
| Official Xbox Magazine (UK) | 8/10 |
| Shacknews | 7/10 |
| The Games Machine (Italy) | 7.3/10 |
| Softpedia | 4/5 |

The game received "mixed or average reviews" according to review aggregator Metacritic.

=== Sales ===
In Japan, approximately 76,894 physical units for PS4 were sold during its launch week, becoming the top-selling game that week. As of 17 March 2019, the PS4 version has sold 190,214 physical units in Japan. The Nintendo Switch version sold 15,588 retail copies during its first week on sale in Japan, making it the seventh bestselling game of the week in the country.

In North America, the game debuted at number two on NPD's monthly sales chart for February 2019, behind only Anthem. Jump Force is North America's fourth best-selling game of 2019 (behind only Kingdom Hearts III, Anthem, and Resident Evil 2), and had the third highest launch month sales for a Bandai Namco game in the territory.

In Europe, Jump Force debuted at number four on the weekly UK charts, with the PS4 version accounting for 74% of launch sales. It debuted at number one on the weekly Italian charts, and at number three on the weekly Switzerland charts, behind the other two new releases of the week, Metro Exodus and Far Cry New Dawn.

Steam Spy estimates that the PC version sold between 50,000 and 100,000 units worldwide on the Steam platform, as of 23 March 2019. And between 200,000 and 500,000 units as of 22 December 2020.

=== Awards ===
| Year | Award | Category | Result | Ref. |
|---|---|---|---|---|
| 2018 | Game Critics Awards | Best Fighting Game | Nominated | |
| 2019 | The Game Awards 2019 | Best Fighting Game | Nominated | |
| 2020 | 23rd Annual D.I.C.E. Awards | Fighting Game of the Year | Nominated | |
| 2020 | NAVGTR Awards | Game, Franchise Fighting | Nominated | |
