= One Piece: Grand Adventure =

2006 video game

- North American PlayStation 2 cover art
- Developer: Ganbarion
- Publisher: Namco Bandai Games
- Series: One Piece
- Platforms: GameCube, PlayStation 2
- Release: NA: August 30, 2006; EU: September 22, 2006 (PS2); AU: December 8, 2006 (PS2)
- Genre: Fighting
- Modes: Single-player, multiplayer

One Piece: Grand Adventure is a video game for the PlayStation 2 and the GameCube based on the One Piece manga series and its anime adaptation. It was created as a sequel to One Piece: Grand Battle! and its gameplay remains mostly unchanged. Grand Adventure adds more characters, levels, and features. The game was released exclusively for North America, Europe, Australia and Korea.

== Gameplay ==
The main mode of Grand Adventure is Adventure Mode, in which the player must beat 10 levels to complete an adventure. The player uses the Going Merry to sail the Grand Line and visit various islands. On these islands, the player will engage in combat against other characters. Characters defeated this way may join your character's crew, or play in various mini-games. Characters gain experience points by being used and can level up, increasing certain stats of the character (HP, attack, defense, etc.). The game includes 24 characters to choose from, plus almost 50 support characters.

== Reception ==
Reception

Aggregate scores
| Aggregator | Score | |
| Aggregator | GameCube | PS2 |
|---|---|---|
| GameRankings | 73.70% | 68.44% |
| Metacritic | 70/100 | 66/100 |

Review scores
| Publication | Score | |
| Publication | GameCube | PS2 |
|---|---|---|
| 1Up.com | N/A | D+ |
| GameSpot | 5.6/10 | 5.6/10 |
| GameSpy | 4/5 | 4/5 |
| GameTrailers | 6.3/10 | 6.3/10 |
| GameZone | N/A | 7.5/10 |
| IGN | 7.8/10 | 7.8/10 |
| Nintendo Power | 5.5/10 | N/A |
| Official U.S. PlayStation Magazine | N/A | 5/10 |
| PlayStation: The Official Magazine | N/A | 6.5/10 |
| X-Play | N/A | 2/5 |

The game was met with average reception upon release. GameRankings and Metacritic gave it a score of 74% and 70 out of 100 for the GameCube version, and 68% and 66 out of 100 for the PlayStation 2 version.
