= One Piece: Pirates' Carnival =

2005 video game

- North American GameCube cover art
- Developer: h.a.n.d.
- Publishers: JP: Bandai; WW: Namco Bandai Games (Note: Released under the Bandai label outside North America)
- Series: One Piece
- Platforms: PlayStation 2, GameCube
- Release: JP: November 23, 2005; KOR: March 14, 2006; NA: September 12, 2006
- Genre: Party
- Modes: Single-player, multiplayer

One Piece: Pirates' Carnival (ONE PIECE(ワンピース) パイレーツカーニバル, Wan Pīsu: Pairētsu Kānibaru) is a party video game developed by h.a.n.d. and published by Namco Bandai Games for the GameCube and PlayStation 2. It is based on the One Piece manga series and its anime adaptation. It comprises over 30 different minigames, which support up to four players, and includes a Reversi-like board game mode in which winning minigames lets the player take control of squares and recruit pirates for their ship's crew. It uses the opening "Map of the Heart" (ココロのちず, Kokoro no Chizu) in the Japanese version.

== Gameplay ==
The main style of gameplay is the Board Game, which features a massive gameboard consisting of dozens of panels. The objective of the game is to have as much money as possible when every tile belongs to a player. Each player has two varieties of money - the money earned from winning a minigame and the money earned from simply owning a panel. Note that while the latter is easily increased (and just as easily decreased), only three effects in the entire game can affect the former.

Each of the four players take turns uncovering panels around the gameboard; who goes first is determined by a minigame at the beginning that takes place at the center panel. While at the beginning, players can only uncover panels that are close to the central one, as the game goes on, more panels may be uncovered. A panel owned by a player is marked by being bordered with the player's colors; if the color is gray, then nobody owns it and anyone can select it.

Similar to One Piece: Grand Battle! Rush, some gameplay items and features were removed from the American version because the American version of the anime had not progressed as far as the Japanese version (Everything past the Skypiea Arc of the anime was removed) and the soundtrack of the introduction of the game was changed because 4Kids' version of the anime never used any of the original theme songs.

== Reception ==
Reception

Aggregate scores
Aggregator	Score	
Aggregator	GameCube	PS2
GameRankings	45.29%	51.15%
Metacritic	49/100	47/100

Review scores
Publication	Score	
Publication	GameCube	PS2
Famitsu	(C+A) 32/40; 25/40	25/40
Game Informer	4/10	4/10
GamePro	N/A	2.5/5
GameSpot	5.4/10	5.4/10
GameSpy	2/5	2/5
GameZone	N/A	7/10
IGN	4.5/10	4.5/10
Nintendo Power	5.5/10	N/A
Nintendo World Report	3/10	N/A
Official U.S. PlayStation Magazine	N/A	3/10

The game was met with very mixed to negative reception upon release. GameRankings gave it a score of 51% and 47 out of 100 for the PlayStation 2 version, and 45% and 49 out of 100 for the GameCube version. In Japan, Famitsu gave the game a score of one seven and three sixes, bringing it to a total of 25 out of 40. Famitsu Cube + Advance, however, gave the GameCube version a score of one nine, two eights, and one seven, bringing it to a total of 32 out of 40.
