= One Piece Treasure Cruise =

2014 role-playing video game

- Developer: Bandai Namco Entertainment
- Publisher: Bandai Namco Entertainment
- Producer: Tomoya Yoshizawa
- Series: One Piece
- Platforms: Android, iOS
- Release: JP: May 12, 2014; WW: February 8, 2015
- Genres: Turn-based role-playing, Auto battler
- Modes: Single-player, Multiplayer

One Piece Treasure Cruise (ONE PIECE(ワンピース) トレジャークルーズ) is a free-to-play role-playing video game set in the One Piece universe, developed and published by Bandai Namco Entertainment. It was released for Android and iOS platforms. As of September 2019 the game has exceeded 100 million downloads worldwide. It features gacha game mechanics.

== Regional variants ==
The Japanese-language version has been available from May 12, 2014.

The English-language version of the game was released on February 8, 2015 and a French-language version on July 28 that year; both version co-exist in the same server referred to as 'Global'. On 22 July 2015, in collaboration with Line, the game was released for Taiwan, Macau and Hong Kong, and in the fall of that year it was released on several further South East Asian markets, (Thailand, Malaysia, Indonesia, and Singapore). In May 2016, a Korean version was released and was shut down on April 21, 2021, to be merged with Global on December 19, 2021. The South-Asian Line server was closed in December 2017.

== Gameplay ==
Gameplay-wise, it is a light RPG video game in which players can organize crews consisting of six characters; character abilities grow as the player progresses through the game. Combat is dexterity based, based on the timing on taps. The game also summarizes the story of the One Piece manga as the player progresses through the story arc. The game features over 1,000 characters to summon and collect which makes it one of biggest gacha game cast.

== Reception ==
The game has a freemium pricing strategy. Before it was released in English, the Japanese version was one of top 30 grossing mobile games in Japan of 2014, which has been attributed to its efficient design, as well as to the popularity of the One Piece franchise. Within a month of its release, the game was including in the top 100 grossing (mobile) games in the US market.

The Metacritic score, as of September 2016, was 79, with a note that the score shows "Generally favorable reviews based on 4 critics".

The game has been called an improved version of Brave Frontier.
