= Jump Ultimate Stars =

2006 video game

- Developer: Ganbarion
- Publisher: Nintendo
- Platform: Nintendo DS
- Release: JP: November 23, 2006
- Genre: 2D versus fighting
- Modes: Single-player, multiplayer

Jump Ultimate Stars is a 2006 crossover fighting video game developed by Ganbarion and published by Nintendo for the Nintendo DS. It is the sequel to Jump Super Stars and adds numerous more features. The game boasts 305 characters (56 of which are fully playable) from 41 different Shōnen manga series. Jump Ultimate Stars was released in Japan on November 23, 2006.

== Gameplay ==
Gameplay screenshots

The bulk of the gameplay is based around using manga panels that represent characters to create decks on a four by five grid. Panels come in various shapes and sizes, taking up one to eight blocks. There are three kinds of panels that can be initialized in battle: Battle, Support, and Help panels, with decks needing at least one of each type and an assigned leader before being playable. Battle panels are four to eight block panels that represent playable characters. They are based on various manga panels and are used to represent what kind of special attacks the characters have. Support panels are two or three block panels that represent non-playable characters that can perform actions such as attacks, healing or status effects. Help panels are one block panels that can give different boosts to characters they are placed next to. Each battle panel comes with a certain nature. These natures (Knowledge, Strength, and Laughter) act in a Rock, Paper, Scissors relationship with Strength beating Knowledge, Knowledge beating Laughter, and Laughter beating Strength. The stronger type will deal more damage to the weaker type. New panels can be unlocked by clearing challenges in Story Mode, or evolving existing panels using gems collected in Story Mode to unlock new paths and panels, such as stronger variations of Battle panels.

=== Battle ===
Battles commence in arenas made to look like the page of a manga. Each arena has a unique background, obstacles based on the different manga series, and contain a variety of different platforms. Many are static while others will move, break, or disappear and reappear randomly. Certain walls and floors are also destructible. During battles, players use their Battle komas to attack opponents, defeating them once they have taken enough damage or have knocked them off the stage.

=== New features ===
Jump Ultimate Stars has been changed slightly from the gameplay of Jump Super Stars. Jump Ultimate Stars gives battle characters the ability to dash and to do a new attack while guarding, which, instead of breaking the guard of the opponent, forces them to change characters, and can be identified by a green glow coming out of the characters which executes it. Also, certain seven and eight panel koma (along with certain five and six panel koma) obtain a visual difference during battle as opposed to the appearance of the one to six koma of the very same character; some of these variations also bring a totally different set of attacks to the character (e.g. Luffy becomes Luffy (Gear 2nd) for his Level 7 & 8 koma, Naruto Uzumaki becomes Kyubii Naruto for his Level 7 & 8 koma, and Ichigo becomes Bankai Ichigo for his Level 7 & 8 level koma). Battle characters now have a new ability known as Ultimate Actions (UA). These UA are different for each character, as some recover health, other recover SP, while others can be used to dodge enemy attacks. Another new feature added is the Evolution Chart. This area allows players to upgrade their characters by spending gems (currency earned for KO'ing opponents) to buy a new koma. Each character has a chart, starting from the one block help koma and branching off into the two and three block Support and the four to eight block Battle koma. Some characters have alternate block paths which unlock a different type for that character (e.g. Goku as a Laughter type instead of a Power type), while others can be used to unlock koma for characters from the same series, quizzes for the series, and new worlds in the Story Mode.

== Represented series and characters ==
This is a list of represented series in Jump Ultimate Stars. Most of the main characters from each series appear as characters within the game. Note that almost all of the Battle characters are also Support and Help characters. This is also true for Support characters being Help characters. However, the exceptions are Sasuke Uchiha, Raoh, Frieza, Majin Buu and Heihachi Edajima; these characters do not have a Support character koma, but they do have their Help koma alternative. The asterisk marks newly included series. There are 24 returning series with the addition of 17 new ones, concluding 41 in total.

- Black Cat
  - 5 characters (2 Battle, 1 Support, 2 Help)
  - Battle characters: Eve and Train Heartnet
- Bleach
  - 17 characters (4 Battle, 7 Support, 6 Help)
  - Battle characters: Ichigo Kurosaki, Rukia Kuchiki, Tōshirō Hitsugaya and Renji Abarai
  - Ichigo Kurosaki evolves into Bankai Ichigo (Lv7) and Bankai Ichigo with Hollow Mask (Lv8)
- Bobobo-bo Bo-bobo
  - 12 characters (2 Battle, 4 Support, 6 Help)
  - Battle characters: Bobobo-bo Bo-bobo and Don Patch
- Buso Renkin
  - 4 characters (1 Battle, 0 Support, 3 Help)
  - Battle character: Kazuki Muto
- Captain Tsubasa*
  - 5 characters (0 Battle, 3 Support, 2 Help)
- Cobra*
  - 3 characters (all Support)
- D.Gray-man
  - 9 characters (2 Battle, 3 Support, 4 Help)
  - Battle characters: Allen Walker and Lenalee Lee
- Death Note
  - 5 characters (all Support)
  - Light Yagami and Ryuk count as a single character.
- Dr. Slump
  - 7 characters (2 Battle, 2 Support, 3 Help)
  - Battle characters: Arale Norimaki and Dr. Mashirito
- Dragon Ball
  - 13 characters (7 Battle, 2 Support, 4 Help)
  - Battle characters: Son Goku, Vegeta, Son Gohan (Super Saiyan form), Gotenks, Piccolo, Frieza and Majin Buu
  - Goku evolves into Super Saiyan Goku (Lv6), Super Saiyan 2 Goku (Super Saiyan 3 in his Kamehameha state) (Lv7) and Super Saiyan Vegetto (Lv8)
  - Vegeta evolves into Super Saiyan Vegeta (Lv5) and Super Saiyan 2 Vegeta (Lv6)
  - Gohan evolves into Super Saiyan 2 Gohan (Lv5)
  - Gotenks evolves into Super Saiyan 3 Gotenks (Lv5, Lv6)
  - Son Goten, Kami, Nail and Dende were removed from the Dragon Ball cast
- Eyeshield 21
  - 17 characters (0 Battle, 11 Support, 6 Help)
  - The Ha-Ha Brothers count as a single character
- Fist of the North Star*
  - 7 characters (2 Battle, 2 Support, 3 Help)
  - Battle characters: Kenshiro and Raoh
- Gintama
  - 13 characters (2 Battle, 6 Support, 5 Help)
  - Battle characters: Gintoki Sakata and Kagura
- Hoshin Engi*
  - 4 characters (1 Battle, 1 Support, 2 Help)
  - Battle character: Taikoubou
- Hunter × Hunter
  - 7 characters (2 Battle, 3 Support, 2 Help)
  - Battle characters: Gon Freecss and Killua Zoldyck
- I"s*
  - 4 characters (0 Battle, 2 Support, 2 Help)
- Strawberry 100%
  - 7 characters (0 Battle, 4 Support, 3 Help)
- Jigoku Sensei Nūbē*
  - 4 characters (0 Battle, 2 Support, 2 Help)
- JoJo's Bizarre Adventure
  - 10 characters (2 Battle, 6 Support, 2 Help)
  - Battle characters: Jotaro Kujo (with Star Platinum) and Dio Brando (with the World)
- Jungle King Tar-chan*
  - 4 characters (0 Battle, 1 Support, 3 Help)
- Katekyo Hitman Reborn!
  - 10 characters (1 Battle, 6 Support, 3 Help)
  - Battle character: Tsuna Sawada (paired with Reborn)
- Kinnikuman*
  - 10 characters (1 Battle, 7 Support, 2 Help)
  - Battle character: Kinnikuman
- Kochikame
  - 15 characters (1 Battle, 8 Support, 6 Help)
  - Battle character: Kankichi Ryotsu
- Majin Tantei Nōgami Neuro*
  - 4 characters (1 Battle, 0 Support, 3 Help)
  - Battle character: Neuro Nogami (paired with Yako Katsuragi)
- Midori no Makibaō*
  - 3 characters (0 Battle, 2 Support, 1 Help)
- Muhyo & Roji's Bureau of Supernatural Investigation*
  - 7 characters (1 Battle, 4 Support, 2 Help)
  - Battle character: Toru Muhyo
- Naruto
  - 9 characters (4 Battle, 1 Support, 4 Help)
  - Battle characters: Naruto Uzumaki, Sasuke Uchiha, Sakura Haruno and Kakashi Hatake
  - Naruto Uzumaki evolves into Kyūbi Naruto (Lv7)
  - Rock Lee, Neji Hyuuga, Hinata Hyuuga and Shikamaru Nara were removed from the Naruto cast
- Ninku*
  - 3 characters (1 Battle, 0 Support, 2 Help)
  - Battle character: Fuusuke
- One Piece
  - 10 characters (6 Battle, 2 Support, 2 Help)
  - Battle characters: Monkey D. Luffy, Roronoa Zoro, Nami, Sanji, Nico Robin and Franky
  - Kiwi and Mozu count as a single character
  - Monkey D. Luffy evolves into Luffy: Gear Second (Lv7, Lv8)
- Pyu to Fuku! Jaguar
  - 7 characters (1 Battle, 3 Support, 3 Help)
  - Battle character: Jaguar Junichi
- Rokudenashi Blues*
  - 5 characters (0 Battle, 1 Support, 4 Help)
- Rurouni Kenshin
  - 7 characters (1 Battle, 4 Support, 2 Help)
  - Battle character: Himura Kenshin
- Saint Seiya*
  - 7 characters (1 Battle, 4 Support, 2 Help)
  - Battle character: Pegasus Seiya
  - Pegasus Seiya evolves into Sagittarius Seiya (Lv8)
- Sakigake!! Otokojuku*
  - 10 characters (2 Battle, 4 Support, 4 Help)
  - Battle characters: Momotaro Tsurugi and Heihachi Edajima
- Shaman King
  - 8 characters (2 Battle, 1 Support, 5 Help)
  - Battle characters: Yoh Asakura and Anna Kyoyama
- Slam Dunk
  - 7 characters (0 Battle, 5 Support, 2 Help)
- Taizō Mote King Saga*
  - 3 characters (0 Battle, 2 Support, 1 Help)
- The Prince of Tennis
  - 9 characters (all Support)
  - Shuichiro Oishi and Eiji Kikumaru count as a single character
  - No characters of the series were added from Jump Super Stars
- Tottemo! Luckyman*
  - 3 characters (0 Battle, 2 Support, 1 Help)
- Yu-Gi-Oh!
  - 5 characters (1 Battle, 1 Support, 3 Help)
  - Battle character: Yami Yugi
- YuYu Hakusho
  - 6 characters (3 Battle, 1 Support, 2 Help)
  - Battle characters: Yusuke Urameshi, Kurama and Hiei

== Reception ==
Reception

Aggregate score
Aggregator	Score
Metacritic	89/100

Review scores
Publication	Score
Consoles +	18/20
NGamer	82/100

Jump Ultimate Stars garnered "generally favorable reviews", according to review aggregator site Metacritic.
