= One Piece: Unlimited World Red =

2013 action-adventure game

- Packaging artwork released for all territories
- Developer: Ganbarion
- Publisher: Bandai Namco Games
- Director: Shuji Yoshida
- Series: One Piece
- Platforms: Nintendo 3DS, PlayStation 3, PlayStation Vita, Wii U, Nintendo Switch, PlayStation 4, Windows
- Release: Nintendo 3DS: JP: November 21, 2013; AU: June 26, 2014; EU: June 27, 2014; NA: July 8, 2014; PS3, PS Vita, Wii U: JP: June 12, 2014; AU: June 26, 2014; EU: June 27, 2014; NA: July 8, 2014; PS4, Windows (Deluxe Edition): JP: August 24, 2017; EU: August 25, 2017; NA: August 25, 2017; Nintendo Switch (Deluxe Edition): JP: August 24, 2017; EU: September 29, 2017; NA: September 29, 2017
- Genre: Action-adventure
- Modes: Single-player, multiplayer

One Piece: Unlimited World Red (Note: Japanese: ONE PIECE(ワンピース) アンリミテッドワールド レッド, Hepburn: Wan Pīsu: Anrimiteddo Wārudo Reddo) is an action-adventure video game based on the famous One Piece manga and anime. This is the thirty-sixth video game based on the series, and the fifth title in the Unlimited sub-series. It was released for the Nintendo 3DS in Japan on November 21, 2013, and released for additional platforms and in more regions the following year. On March 12, 2014, the game was confirmed to be releasing in North America, Europe, and Japan in 2014 on PlayStation 3, PlayStation Vita, and Wii U. The Wii U version does not have a physical retail release in North America and Australia. Whilst other versions were released by July 8, 2014, in North America, the PlayStation Vita version was released in the region on July 14, 2014, and its limited retail release was sold exclusively via GameStop stores.

An enhanced port of the game was released on the Nintendo Switch and PlayStation 4, as well as Steam in Japan on August 24, 2017.

== Reception ==
Reception

Aggregate score
Aggregator	Score
Metacritic	3DS: 75/100; PS3: 71/100; VITA: 67/100; WIIU: 66/100; PS4: 68/100; NS: 68/100

The game has a score of 71/100 on Metacritic. IGN awarded it a score of 7.0 out of 10 and said "The Straw Hat Pirates all put up a fight in this exciting but sometimes exhausting brawler adventure.". PlayStation LifeStyle awarded it a score of 6.0 out of 10, saying "There is a good game here hidden under layers of tacked on mini-games and half-baked ideas." Destructoid awarded it a score of 7 out of 10, saying "One Piece Unlimited World Red is a very standard action game that won't excite masters of the genre, but it has more than enough charm to make up for its simplicity." Nintendo Life awarded it 7 out of 10, saying "Unlimited World Red is a good example of a licensed game done well."

Following the announcement of the 2017 remaster, Unlimited World Red had sold 1 million copies worldwide.
