= Jump Super Stars =

2005 video game

- Developer: Ganbarion
- Publisher: Nintendo
- Directors: Takao Nakano; Tōru Haga
- Producers: Chikako Yamakura; Hitoshi Yamagami
- Designers: Hiroshi Tsurumoto; Takahiro Hayashi; Tōru Haga
- Programmer: Tsuyoshi Kumagai
- Artists: Aki Sakurai; Chiharu Sakiyama; Sachiko Nakamichi
- Composer: Yūichi Hirose
- Platform: Nintendo DS
- Release: JP: August 8, 2005
- Genre: Fighting
- Modes: Single-player, multiplayer

Jump Super Stars (Note: Japanese: ジャンプスーパースターズ, Hepburn: Janpu Sūpā Sutāzu) is a 2D crossover fighting game for the Nintendo DS, based on Weekly Shōnen Jump characters. It was developed by Ganbarion and published by Nintendo. The game was released on August 8, 2005, in Japan and accompanied the release of a red Nintendo DS. A sequel, Jump Ultimate Stars, was released in Japan on November 23, 2006.

== Gameplay ==
Gameplay screenshots

Jump Super Stars features characters from the Japanese manga magazine Weekly Shōnen Jump. The game supports 2-4 players in multiplayer and features over 75 missions.

Koma (panel) is the term for the characters that the player can use in the game. Each koma uses from 1 to 7 squares of the koma deck at the bottom screen of the Nintendo DS. The deck has 20 squares (4 x 5) for the player to place their koma.

There are three types of koma: help koma, support koma and battle koma.

- Help koma are only one square large. They'll boost up or help players in the game, but they will not appear on Battle Screen.
- Support koma are two to three squares large. These koma will show up briefly on the battle screen to help the player, generally by attacking, blocking, restoring health, or some other move.
- Battle koma are four to seven squares large, and these koma fight throughout each round. These koma represents the characters that the player controls in the battle screen, and the player can switch between characters by tapping their koma in the koma deck like a tag battle.

The player can build and store up to ten koma decks, and each deck must have at least one help koma, one support koma and one battle koma to be valid for use in battle. There are also a set of predefined decks that the player can use, but the player cannot change or delete those. It is also possible to exchange decks between friends, but they won't be able to edit the decks.

Ally boosting is done by placing koma next to each other in the deck maker. If the koma placed next to each other are "compatible", their attributes will go up. Battle characters can get a longer health bar, or increase the maximum number of special attack gauges.

== Represented series ==
This is a list of represented series in Jump Super Stars. Most of the main characters from each series appear as characters within the games. There are 27 series in total.

Black Cat

- 4 characters (1 Battle, 2 Support, 1 Help)
- Eve is a selectable character.
- Train Heartnet and Sven Vollfied are support characters.

Bleach

- 6 characters (1 Battle, 1 Support, 4 Help)
- Ichigo Kurosaki is a selectable character.
- Rukia Kuchiki is a support character.

Bobobo-bo Bo-bobo

- 11 characters (2 Battle, 2 Support, 7 Help)
- Bobobo-bo Bo-bobo and Don Patch are selectable characters.
- Jelly Jiggler and Gasser are support characters.

Buso Renkin

- 3 characters (1 Battle, 0 Support, 2 Help)
- Kazuki Muto is a selectable character.

Death Note

- 3 characters (0 Battle, 2 Support, 1 Help)
- Light Yagami and L are support characters.

D.Gray-man

- 3 characters (1 Battle, 0 Support, 2 Help)
- Allen Walker is a selectable character.

Dragon Ball

- 15 characters (5 Battle, 1 Support, 9 Help)
- Goku, Vegeta, Gohan, Piccolo and Gotenks are selectable characters.
- Krillin is a support character.

Dr. Slump

- 3 characters (2 Battle, 0 Support, 1 Help)
- Arale Norimaki and Dr. Mashirito are selectable characters.

Eyeshield 21

- 7 characters (0 Battle, 3 Support, 4 Help)
- Sena Kobayakawa, Yoichi Hiruma and Ryokan Kurita are support characters.

Gintama

- 8 characters (1 Battle, 2 Support, 5 Help)
- Gintoki Sakata is a selectable character.
- Shinpachi Shimura and Kagura are support characters.

Hunter × Hunter

- 6 characters (1 Battle, 2 Support, 3 Help)
- Gon Freecss is a selectable character.
- Killua Zoldyck and Kurapika are support characters.

Hikaru no Go

- 1 character (0 Battle, 1 Support, 0 Help)
- Hikaru Shindo (paired with Fujiwara-no-Sai) is a support character.

JoJo's Bizarre Adventure

- 2 characters (2 Battle, 0 Support, 0 Help)
- Jotaro Kujo (with Star Platinum) and Dio Brando (with The World) are selectable characters.

Kochira Katsushika-ku Kameari Kōen-mae Hashutsujo

- 7 characters (1 Battle, 3 Support, 3 Help)
- Kankichi Ryotsu is a selectable character.
- Daijiro Ohara, Keiichi Nakagawa and Reiko Katherine Akimoto are support characters.

Mr. Fullswing

- 4 characters (0 Battle, 1 Support, 3 Help)
- Amakuni Saruno is a support character.

Naruto

- 12 characters (4 Battle, 4 Support, 4 Help)
- Naruto Uzumaki, Sasuke Uchiha, Sakura Haruno and Kakashi Hatake are selectable characters.
- Shikamaru Nara, Rock Lee, Neji Hyuga and Hinata Hyuga are support characters.

One Piece

- 8 characters (5 Battle, 2 Support, 1 Help)
- Monkey D. Luffy, Roronoa Zoro, Nami, Sanji and Nico Robin are selectable characters.
- Usopp and Tony Tony Chopper are support characters.

Pyu to Fuku! Jaguar

- 6 characters (1 Battle, 2 Support, 3 Help)
- Junichi Jaguar is a selectable character.
- Piyohiko and Hammer are support characters.

Reborn!

- 4 characters (1 Battle, 1 Support, 2 Help)
- Tsuna Sawada (paired with Reborn) is a selectable character.
- Lambo is a support character.

Rurouni Kenshin

- 4 characters (1 Battle, 2 Support, 1 Help)
- Himura Kenshin is a selectable character.
- Sagara Sanosuke and Saitō Hajime are support characters.

Shaman King

- 7 characters (2 Battle, 1 Support, 4 Help)
- Yoh Asakura and Anna Kyoyama are selectable characters.
- Hao Asakura is a support character.

Slam Dunk

- 4 characters (0 Battle, 2 Support, 2 Help)
- Hanamichi Sakuragi and Kaede Rukawa are support characters.

Steel Ball Run

- 2 characters (0 Battle, 1 Support, 1 Help)
- Gyro Zeppeli is a support character.

Strawberry 100%

- 7 character (0 Battle, 4 Support, 3 Help)
- Aya Toujou, Tsukasa Nishino, Satsuki Kitaoji and Yui Minamito are support characters.

The Prince of Tennis

- 9 character (0 Battle, 6 Support, 3 Help)
- Ryoma Echizen, Kunimitsu Tezuka, Shusuke Fuji, Eiji Kikumaru (with Shuichiro Oishi),
  Takeshi Momoshiro and Kaoru Kaido are support characters.

Yu-Gi-Oh!

- 6 character (1 Battle, 0 Support, 5 Help)
- Yugi Mutou is a selectable character.

Yu Yu Hakusho

- 4 character (1 Battle, 2 Support, 1 Help)
- Yusuke Urameshi is a selectable character.
- Kurama and Hiei are support characters.

== Development and release ==
Jump Super Stars was first revealed in an issue of Weekly Shōnen Jump. Ganbarion was commissioned to develop the game by Hitoshi Yamagami, the head of Nintendo SPD at the time, and the development team had less than a year to finish the title. Jump Super Stars was later shown at Jump Festa 2005, the same event where Nintendo revealed plans to release games based on Eyeshield 21.

Video game company Tommo had exclusive distribution rights to sell Jump Super Stars (and Jump Ultimate Stars) in North America through retailers such as Best Buy and Fry's Electronics. Many small business received minimal stock of these games.

== Reception ==
Reception

Aggregate score
Aggregator	Score
Metacritic	80/100

Review scores
Publication	Score
Consoles +	17/20
Famitsu	32/40
Gamekult	3.5/5
GamesTM	7/10
Hardcore Gamer	4/5
NGC Magazine	4/5
Nintendo Life	9/10
Nintendo World Report	9/10
X-Play	4/5
Play	6.5/10

Jump Super Stars garnered "generally favorable reviews", according to review aggregator site Metacritic. The game sold between 202,139 and 220,912 copies in its first week of availability on the market, according to Famitsu and Media Create. It became one of Japan's best-selling games in 2005, selling between 464,076 and 549,265 copies during its lifetime.
