= One Piece Grand Collection =

2012 mobile video game

- Developer(s): Namco Bandai Games
- Publisher(s): Namco Bandai Games
- Platform(s): Android, iOS
- Genre(s): Social-network

One Piece Grand Collection is a social-network game by Namco Bandai. It has 1 million users.

Namco Bandai started work on the game with the goal of 10 Billion Yen in annual sales. Gameplay revolves around collecting figurines and forming battle groups to defeat bosses.
