= One Piece: Burning Blood =

2016 fighting video game

- European cover art
- Developer: Spike Chunsoft
- Publisher: Bandai Namco Entertainment
- Director: Hiroyuki Kaneko
- Producer: Koji Nakajima
- Designers: Tairi Kikuchi; Satoshi Sumiya; Yukinori Kawamoto
- Programmers: Akira Watanabe; Yuki Hashimoto; Shigeru Saito
- Artists: Tatsunori Oohashi; Nobuyoshi Kanzaki; Hayato Kabe; Satoru Matsuyama
- Composer: Hiromi Mizutani
- Series: One Piece
- Platforms: PlayStation 4 PlayStation Vita; Xbox One; Windows
- Release: PlayStation 4, PlayStation Vita: JP: April 21, 2016; NA: May 31, 2016; EU: June 3, 2016; Xbox One: NA: May 31, 2016; EU: June 3, 2016; Windows: NA: September 1, 2016; EU: September 2, 2016
- Genre: Fighting
- Modes: Single-player, multiplayer

One Piece: Burning Blood (Note: One Piece: Burning Blood (ONE PIECE(ワンピース) バーニングブラッド, Wan Pīsu: Bāningu Buraddo)) is a fighting video game developed by Spike Chunsoft and published by Bandai Namco Entertainment. Based on the One Piece franchise, it was released for PlayStation 4, PlayStation Vita, Xbox One, and Windows. It is the first One Piece video game to be released on an Xbox video game console. It was released in Japan on April 21, 2016, in North America on May 31, 2016, and in Europe on June 3, 2016. The Windows version was released in North America on September 1, 2016, and in Europe on September 2, 2016. The game was not released for Xbox One in Japan.

== Gameplay ==
Gameplay screenshot from One Piece: Burning Blood

One Piece: Burning Blood is a fighting game, which features a cel-shaded artstyle, similar to the One Piece anime. The game also features an "advanced battle system", which allows players to perform stronger attacks and block normal attacks from enemies. Similar to the Grand Battle! series, Burning Blood is a 1-on-1 (and up to 9 vs 9) fighting game. It focuses on fighting as well as devil fruit abilities, with Logia users being able to use their powers to avoid damage.

== Development ==
On September 8, 2015, publisher Bandai Namco Entertainment trademarked three names, one of which is Burning Blood. The game was officially announced at Sony Computer Entertainment Japan Asia's Tokyo Game Show 2015 press conference.

== Reception ==
Reception

Aggregate score
Aggregator	Score
Metacritic	PS4: 66/100; VITA: 62/100; XONE: 60/100

Review scores
Publication	Score
Destructoid	55%
Eurogamer	60%
GameRevolution	50%
GamesMaster	56%
HobbyConsolas	80%
IGN	79%
MeriStation	75%
Official Xbox Magazine (UK)	40%
Push Square	79%
The Games Machine (UK)	55%

The game debuted at number one of the Japanese sales charts, with 35,496 copies sold on PS4 and 32,682 sold on PS Vita in its first week in Japan. In four weeks PS4 and PS Vita versions sold 104,120 units in Japan.

It currently holds an aggregated score of 66 on Metacritic, indicating "mixed or average reviews", based on 45 reviews. IGN awarded it a score of 6.5 out of 10, saying "One Piece: Burning Blood is a bit too much for the uninitiated, and a bit too little for One Piece stalwarts." Destructoid awarded it 5.5 out of 10, saying " The combat here just isn't that fun, and no amount of colorful anime action will change that." Hardcore Gamer awarded it a score of 3 out of five, saying, "One Piece: Burning Blood is one of those middle of the road games that makes game reviewers weep...Neither good nor bad, it exists." Famitsu awarded it four scores of 8 out of 10, which equaled an overall score of 32/40.
