= One Piece: Unlimited Adventure =

2007 video game

- Developer: Ganbarion
- Publisher: Namco Bandai Games (Note: Released under the Bandai label in Japan)
- Director: Hirofumi Irie
- Series: One Piece
- Platform: Wii
- Release: JP: April 26, 2007; NA: January 22, 2008
- Genre: Action-adventure
- Modes: Single-player, multiplayer

One Piece: Unlimited Adventure (Note: Japanese: ONE PIECE(ワンピース) アンリミテッドアドベンチャー, Hepburn: Wan Pīsu: Anrimiteddo Adobenchaa) is an action-adventure video game developed by Ganbarion and published by Namco Bandai Games for the Wii. It is based on the manga One Piece by Eiichiro Oda and its anime adaptation. It was released in Japan on April 26, 2007, and in North America on January 22, 2008.

A sequel, One Piece: Unlimited Cruise, was released for the Wii in 2008.

== Gameplay ==
Story Mode

A basic adventure game with platforms, puzzles, and item collecting. To progress in the game, the player must collect certain items for Franky and Usopp to make new tools in order to create new paths. Fishing and bug hunting are also major side quests; certain bugs and fish must be captured to break seals.

Vs. Mode

The player can choose from any of the over 40 characters that have appeared in the game (including basic enemies and the final boss) in the battle mode. The player can fight against the computer or a friend in the Vs. Mode.

Survival Mode

The player can choose one character from any of the over 40 characters that have appeared in the game (including basic enemies and the final boss) and fight against 1000 opponents.

== Plot ==
The Straw Hat Pirates aboard the Thousand Sunny are in peril as food and water supplies are running low. After Luffy reveals that he, Usopp, and Chopper wasted all the food in an eating contest, Sanji forces him and Chopper to fish to make up for their loss, as well as Usopp looking out for any nearby islands to restock. Instead of catching any fish, Luffy catches what appears to be a jewel. He tries to show the others his newfound mystery jewel, but nobody is interested. They are more worried about the lack of food. "Can't eat it, we don't need it." Luffy decides to use a Gum-Gum Rocket to launch himself into the air to get a better view hoping to see an island. Somehow, the jewel reacts and an island emerges from the sea, under the Thousand Sunny.

Luffy and company decide to search the island for the "Hidden Treasure" which can only be found by breaking all the seals. A strange creature is trying to prevent them from breaking the seals. Not knowing what he is protecting, the Straw Hat Pirates decide to go along with breaking the seals as they look for their missing ship.

Over time, it is revealed the seal is preventing the revival of an evil monster that the island's original inhabitants had created in the hopes of protecting themselves from invaders, and Popora, the island's guardian, has been living alone for 1,000 years since his creator's death, stopping the creature's revival. Luffy and the other Straw Hats decide to help him, breaking the final seals and defeating the monster. After their victory, Popora's creator returns and, to reward him for his service, turns the island into a paradise and allows him to live with several creatures like him. The Straw Hat Pirates sail off after replenishing their food supplies.

== Release ==
Unlimited Adventure was announced for the Wii at E3 2006 with an early demo, the clips of that build featured Luffy, some enemy Marines and the use of the Net with motion controls to catch a bug. Much of the on screen graphics have changed since then. The Health Bar was different, as well as the characters having a much more traditional Leveling system. Another change was the Gem Level Up screen, and the map in the demos being a completely different looking island.

The game lacked any television or website ads in the U.S. Websites such as GameTrailers had online trailers, clips, and teasers, including Smoker, Crocodile, and Arlong's clips, as well as the highly spoilering Franky clip; which revealed his voice for the first time. Unlimited Adventure opening sequence was also revealed in English on Game Trailers, as well as Japanese clips. A few weeks before the game's release dates, Funimation and Bandai Namco created a website to promote the game.

Outside the Internet, the only ads to be seen was entire page ads and game preview articles. Although the preview article stated that there will be "8 Straw Hats to choose from", the English adaptation was only up to Robin's addition to the main cast. In the single page ad, the Thousand Sunny blatantly made an appearance. It would not appear for another 300 chapters in the English Manga. Also, Franky and the Thousand Sunny are both considered a huge spoiler to the series in the United States.

Franky, although confirmed to be in the game, was taken out of all ads, the U.S. box art was edited to remove him. Besides on the actual game, Franky only appears as a cameo in the instruction manual and is a featured character on an ad packed in with the Episode of Alabasta: The Desert Princess and the Pirates DVD.

== Reception ==
Reception

Aggregate scores
Aggregator	Score
GameRankings	69.83%
Metacritic	67/100

Review scores
Publication	Score
1Up.com	B−
GameRevolution	C+
GameSpot	7/10
GameSpy	2.5/5
GameTrailers	6.7/10
GameZone	7/10
IGN	6.8/10
Nintendo Power	6.5/10

The game was met with average reception upon release, as GameRankings gave it a score of 69.83%, while Metacritic gave it 67 out of 100.

In Japan the game sold 110,802 units as of December 30, 2007
