= Roronoa Zoro =

Fictional character from One Piece

- One Piece character
- Roronoa Zoro illustrated by Eiichiro Oda in the color spread of Chapter 598
- First appearance: One Piece chapter 3: "Introducing Pirate Hunter Zoro" (Weekly Shōnen Jump No. 36, August 4, 1997)
- Created by: Eiichiro Oda
- Portrayed by: Mackenyu Maeda (live-action television series); Maximilian Lee Piazza (live-action television series; young); Minosuke Bando (Super Kabuki II: One Piece)
- Voiced by: Japanese; Kazuya Nakai; Megumi Urawa (young); Wataru Takagi (Defeat Him! The Pirate Ganzack); English; Christopher Sabat (Funimation); Cynthia Cranz (Funimation; young); Brina Palencia (Funimation; young); Marc Diraison (4Kids Entertainment); Andrew Rannells (4Kids Entertainment; young); Brian Zimmerman (Odex); Aaron Dismuke (young; One Piece: Unlimited Adventure)
- Birthday: November 11

In-universe information
- Alias: Pirate Hunter
- Relatives: Roronoa Arashi (father); Tera (mother); Roronoa Pinzoro (grandfather); Shimotsuki Furiko (grandmother); Shimotsuki Ushimaru (granduncle); Shimotsuki Ryuma (ancestor)
- Occupation: Pirate; Bounty Hunter (formerly)
- Affiliations: Straw Hat Pirates (combatant / swordsman); Worst Generation (member)
- Age: 19 (debut); 21 (after the timeskip)
- Bounties: 1,111,000,000 (current); 320,000,000 (third); 120,000,000 (second); 60,000,000 (first)

Roronoa Zoro (ロロノア・ゾロ, Roronoa Zoro; spelled as Zolo in some English adaptations), also known as "Pirate Hunter" Zoro (海賊狩りのゾロ, Kaizoku-Gari no Zoro), is a fictional character in the manga series and media franchise One Piece, created by Eiichiro Oda. The character made his first appearance in the third chapter of the series, which was first published in Japan in Shueisha's Weekly Shōnen Jump on August 4, 1997.

Zoro is the second member of the Straw Hat Pirates and the first to join, doing so after being rescued by Monkey D. Luffy from execution. He is a highly skilled swordsman and serves as the crew's combatant. (Note: He is also occasionally referred to simply as the crew's swordsman both in the story and in some media of the One Piece franchise. In the 2023 series, his position is changed to that of first mate; this, however, was eliminated in the Japanese dubbing, where the franchise originates.) He possesses an extremely poor sense of direction, which is a running gag throughout the series.

== Creation and conception ==
Zoro originally used two swords instead of three, and was originally planned to be part of Buggy the Clown's pirate crew before being recruited by Luffy. Zoro's surname, Roronoa, is based on the Japanese pronunciation of the name of the French pirate François l'Olonnais (which is pronounced "Lolonoa" or "Roronoa" in Japanese). In several Western adaptations, his name was spelled Zolo.

=== Design ===
Zoro commonly wears a plain white shirt (though he is sometimes seen wearing other types of shirts), black pants, and a light-green haramaki sash that holds his three swords. These swords are named Enma, Wado Ichimonji, and Sandai Kitetsu. Zoro also has a black bandanna tied around his left bicep that he wears on his head only during serious battles. This bandana was inspired by Nobuhiro Watsuki, one of Oda's best friends and mentors, as well as aspects of his character. Under his shirt, his torso is heavily scarred from many of the battles he has fought, especially since joining the Straw Hats (such as the scar acquired during the battle against Dracule Mihawk, one of the Seven Warlords of the Sea and the Strongest Swordsman in the World). He has three golden earrings in his left ear, which denote his three-sword fighting style. During a two-year time skip, Zoro gains a scar across his left eye (obtained during his training under Dracule Mihawk, although not confirmed by the anime) and replaces his shirt with a long, dark green samurai coat, which he leaves open while fighting (e.g., against the New Fishman Pirates) or in hot environments (e.g., the burning side of Punk Hazard). Regarding his ethnic appearance, Oda stated that he imagines Zoro to be of Japanese descent, albeit in a real-world context.

Zoro has many scars on his body. The most noticeable is the long scar running down his left eye, which he received after returning from the two-year time skip. It is currently unknown how he acquired the scar, but he either cannot or will not open his left eye as a result. He has a heavily scarred torso, including a large diagonal scar running from left shoulder to right hip, which he received from fighting Dracule Mihawk earlier in the series. He has scars on both ankles, which he received while trying to cut off his own legs to escape the candle prison of Mr. 3 (of Baroque Works) in Little Garden, an island in the early Grand Line.

=== Portrayals ===
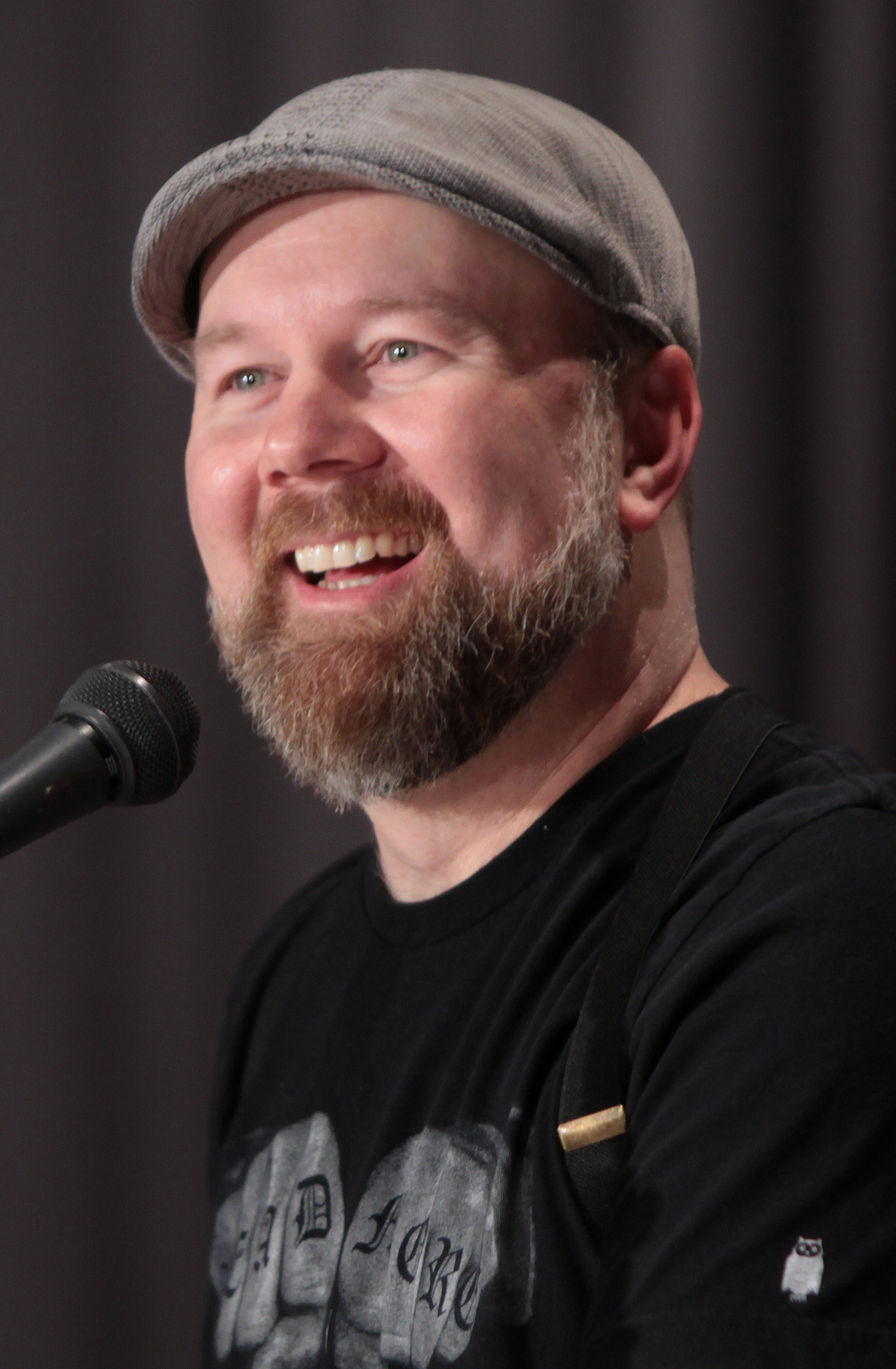
Christopher Sabat voiced Zoro in the Funimation English dub of the anime series.

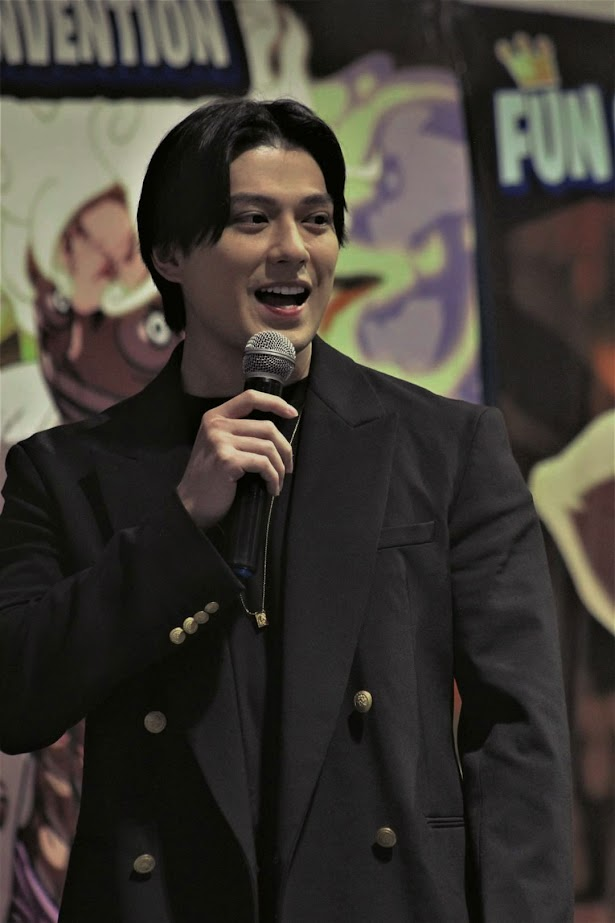
Mackenyu portrays Zoro in the live action series.

In the original Japanese version of the One Piece anime series, Zoro is voiced by Kazuya Nakai as an adult and by Megumi Urawa as a child. In the 1998 OVA Defeat Him! The Pirate Ganzack, Zoro is voiced by Wataru Takagi.

In Odex's dubs of the first 104 episodes of One Piece in Singapore, Zoro was voiced by Brian Zimmerman. In 4kids Entertainment's dub of the first 104 episodes of One Piece, Zoro was renamed "Zolo", which was later adopted in Viz Media's adaptation of the manga; he was voiced by Marc Diraison as an adult and Andrew Rannells as a child. In Funimation Entertainment's dubs of the entire One Piece franchise, adult Zoro is voiced by Christopher Sabat, while child Zoro is voiced by Cynthia Cranz episode 2 and by Brina Palencia for the remainder of the franchise. Sabat compared Zoro's characterization to that of Tsubasa: Reservoir Chronicle's Kurogane and YuYu Hakusho's Kazuma Kuwabara, describing them as "the tough guy with a heart of gold". As a result, Sabat feared that he sometimes performed similar voices, despite the characters being different. He also studied the original actors' performances to avoid developing a more specific delivery.In the game One Piece: Unlimited Adventure, Sabat reprises his role as adult Zoro, while Aaron Dismuke voices child Zoro.

Zoro is portrayed by Mackenyu in the live-action adaptation of One Piece, while Maximilian Lee Piazza portrays young Zoro.

== Characteristics ==
=== Personality ===
Zoro is a confident, serious, and stoic individual who tends to act impulsively, like his captain. He responds to minor conflicts in a comical, short-tempered manner. His notoriously poor sense of direction has become a running gag; he has gotten lost even while walking in a straight line. He is very insecure about this and always blames somebody else after losing his way. While the crew is at sea, Zoro can usually be found sleeping or training to achieve his goal of becoming the world's greatest swordsman. He and Vinsmoke Sanji have a long-running rivalry, often resorting to fights and insults over trivial problems. He notably never calls Sanji by name in the original Japanese manga; instead, he uses phrases like "dumb-cook", " Pervy-cook", and "ero-cook". Sanji calls him phrases such as marimo (moss-head).

Though not a samurai, he appears to maintain a certain degree of bushido and is frequently mistaken for one. Unlike Luffy and most of the Straw Hat Pirates, Zoro has killed his opponents when necessary, though never in cold blood. Zoro enjoys fighting strong opponents and usually faces the second strongest villain in each story arc. Zoro often wears a maniacal grin and serious glare when battling a worthy opponent.

On the ship, he usually either trains with weights or sleeps. The only tasks he is regularly seen doing are hoisting the anchor using his great strength and maintaining a lookout from the ship's crow's nest (which, on the Thousand Sunny, also doubles as his gym). He also likes sake, almost as much as Luffy likes meat, but like Nami, he never gets drunk due to his inhumanly high endurance and tolerance for alcohol. Despite his poor sense of direction, he is often the first to sense an enemy or danger and react. He is often shown to be well aware of dangerous situations and the people around him.

Despite his stern personality, Zoro has a strong sense of loyalty and mutual respect for his crewmates and their pursuit of their dreams. After his humiliating loss to Dracule Mihawk, Zoro pledged his loyalty to Luffy as his captain, vowing that he would never lose again. Zoro often reminds others of the harsh reality of a situation, which sometimes appears too harsh for less emotionally mature members of the crew, although they usually admit he is right in the end. Zoro insisted that Usopp apologize to his crewmates before returning to the Straw Hats from an internal conflict, displaying emotional maturity.

Zoro has stated that he does not pray to any god, does not care one way or the other, and has never believed in anything except himself; he believes that only one man is above him: his captain, Luffy. He has also stated that he would follow Luffy till the end of his journey—becoming the King of the Pirates—but that Luffy should not come between him and his dream of becoming the world's strongest swordsman and surpassing Dracule Mihawk in the process. Zoro knows that he still has much untapped potential and is constantly seen training and improving his fighting skills. He adheres to a sword master's code of honor (bushido) and never brags about or lies about his abilities, sometimes openly admitting a weakness, even to an enemy. He never tries to escape from a fight or use trickery to win, believing that doing so is cowardly and scorning those who use such tactics.

=== Haki ===
Zoro is proficient in Armament and Observation Haki and is one of the few known characters who possesses Conqueror's Haki. During his battle against King, he unlocks an advanced form of Conqueror's Haki that allows him to coat his swords with it, similar to Armament Haki, further increasing the destructive potential of his attacks. This form of Haki is even less common and is limited to only a few individuals at the peak of the One Piece universe. He can also use an advanced form of Armament Haki to project his Haki from a distance (Emission).

== Appearances ==
=== One Piece manga ===
Roronoa Zoro first appears in the manga chapter "Enter Pirate Hunter Zoro" ("海賊狩りのゾロ"登場, Kaizoku-gari no Zoro Tōjō), first published in Japan's Weekly Shōnen Jump magazine on August 4, 1997. He first appears as a captured criminal awaiting execution at the hands of the Marines after offending Helmeppo by killing his pet wolf. Before the beginning of the series' narrative, Zoro made a pact with his childhood friend Kuina, vowing to become the strongest swordsman in the world, only for Kuina to die the next day in an accident. For years, Zoro hunted pirates as a bounty hunter alongside his friends Johnny and Yosaku after getting lost while trying to locate Dracule Mihawk. When Luffy offers Zoro the opportunity to join his crew, Zoro initially refuses. After Luffy saves him from execution, Zoro pledges his loyalty to him. Zoro encounters Mihawk at the Baratie, where he is easily defeated but nevertheless impresses him.

Zoro's loyalty to Luffy develops throughout the series and is unparalleled among the crew. Even though he joined Luffy's crew, his main goal remained becoming the strongest swordsman. Originally, Zoro threatened to kill Luffy if he ever interfered with this goal. He listens to his captain's orders and follows them until the very end. On Jaya, Zoro followed Luffy's orders not to fight an enemy in a bar, no matter what, and did so without hesitation. After fighting Daz Bonez in Alabasta, Zoro's bounty was initially set at 60,000,000 but was later raised to 120,000,000 after his fight against the World Government at Enies Lobby. At Water 7, Zoro upholds Luffy's authority as captain during Luffy's fight with Usopp and Usopp's departure from the crew. Zoro pointedly refuses to allow Usopp to rejoin the crew without an apology and threatens to be the next to leave because letting Usopp "back as if nothing happened" was an insult to Luffy's authority as captain.

At Sabaody Archipelago, Bartholomew Kuma sent the Straw Hats flying across the world, with Zoro trying to save Luffy and Sanji to no avail, as none of the pirates were aware of Kuma's intention to have them separated and sent far away to train for the New World. When he lands, Zoro encounters Mihawk again and trains under him for two years before reuniting with the crew. He receives a bounty of 320,000,000 after defeating an antagonist as large as a mountain and assisting Luffy at the end of Doflamingo's tyrannical rule over Dressrosa. After the events in Wano Country and his contributions in the Onigashima Raid, such as defeating King, he receives a bounty of 1,111,000,000.

In One Piece volume 105, Oda revealed Zoro's family history. His father, Roronoa Arashi, was killed by pirates, and his mother, Tera, died of an illness when he was young. Zoro is a descendant of the Shimotsuki family of Wano Country through his grandmother Furiko, the older sister of Ushimaru, the daimyo of Ringo and Zoro's great-uncle. Zoro and Kuina are distant cousins, and he is a descendant of Shimotsuki Ryuma, the protagonist of the one-shot Monsters and posthumous One Piece character.

=== In other media ===
Zoro has appeared in every One Piece licensed electronic video game to date, as well as crossover games such as Jump Super Stars, Jump Ultimate Stars, Battle Stadium D.O.N., and Jump Force.

== Reception ==
Zoro is always among the three most popular characters, usually only below Luffy in popularity. He ranked second in every Shōnen Jump character popularity poll except the fifth, in which he ranked third after Trafalgar Law. Furthermore, in a 2007 poll by Oricon, Zoro was voted as the fourth-most desired character to receive a spinoff. DVD Talk praises Zoro's "hilarious" three-sword fighting style as a great example of the show's sense of humor. Holly Ellingwood from Activeanime praised Zoro's fight against Luffy as one of the best moments from the series' 10th DVD released by Viz Media, particularly praising the action scenes. Sabat's work with Zoro resulted in his nomination in the "Best Voice Actor (English)" category at the Society for the Promotion of Japanese Animation (SPJA) Awards in 2008. Carl Kimlinger of Anime News Network commented on Sabat's work with Zoro as a "standout", noting that Zoro and Sabat are "well-matched". Kimlinger also found that his and Sanji's flashbacks from the anime "really do jerk tears, even if they are less than gracefully executed".

When Nico Robin refers to Zoro and Sanji as the "Wings of the Pirate King," it "suggests that they're the two most important people to Luffy becoming the Pirate King, for their ability to carry their responsibility effectively and fight at the highest level, if not more."

There has been mixed reception of the live-action version of the character. Kenneth Seward, Jr. opined that Mackenyu "certainly looks the part of Rorona Zoro – especially when playing opposite of Godoy and during fight scenes – but his stiff take on the bounty hunter-turned-Straw Hat is a little off-putting", and Jesse Lab wrote that Mackenyu "comes across as bored and annoyed instead of aloof, turning what should be a badass character into a snarky afterthought."

== See also ==
- Straw Hats
- List of One Piece characters
