= Nami (One Piece) =

Fictional character from One Piece

- One Piece character
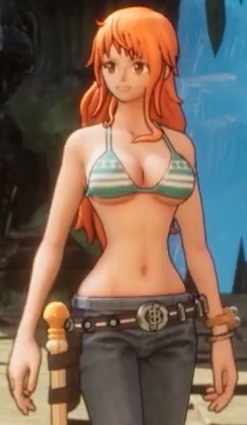
- Nami as depicted in the video game One Piece Odyssey
- First appearance: One Piece chapter 8: "Nami" (Weekly Shōnen Jump No. 42, September 15, 1997)
- Created by: Eiichiro Oda
- Portrayed by: Emily Rudd (live-action television series); Lily Fisher (live-action television series; young); Sophie Ellenbogen (live-action telesion series; toddler); Shun'en Ichikawa (Super Kabuki II: One Piece)
- Voiced by: Japanese; Akemi Okamura; Wakana Yamazaki (episodes 70-78); Megumi Toyoguchi (Defeat the Pirate Ganzack!); English; Luci Christian (Funimation); Kerry Williams (4Kids Entertainment)
- Birthday: July 3

In-universe information
- Alias: Cat Burglar
- Relatives: Belle-Mère (adoptive mother); Nojiko (adoptive sister)
- Affiliations: Straw Hat Pirates (navigator); Straw Hat Grand Fleet; Arlong Pirates (former)
- Age: 18 (debut); 20 (after the time skip)
- Bounties: 366,000,000 (current); 66,000,000 (second); 16,000,000 (first)

Nami (Japanese: ナミ; [na̠mʲi]), also known as "Cat Burglar" Nami, is a fictional character in the One Piece franchise created by Eiichiro Oda. The character made her first appearance in the 8th chapter of the series, which was first published in Japan in Shueisha's Weekly Shōnen Jump magazine on September 15, 1997. She is based on Ann and Silk, two characters from Oda's previous manga Romance Dawn. She is introduced as a thief and pickpocket who possesses cartographical, meteorological, and navigational skills. At first, she is a subordinate of the fishman Arlong, until she is eventually freed of this service and permanently joins Monkey D. Luffy. She is the third member of the Straw Hat Pirates and the second to join.

In the series, Nami is the Straw Hat Pirates' navigator, who dreams of drawing a map of the entire world. Despite her initial distrust of pirates, Nami eventually changes her mind after being around Luffy and the rest of the crew. Nami is depicted as an intelligent girl who is obsessed with obtaining money. She is able to use her three-sectioned staff and her climate skills to create powerful attacks; the most prominent of these staff weapons is the Klima-Tact, in which she manipulates the climate to create weather-based attacks.

== Conception and creation ==
Nami was based on two of Eiichiro Oda's earlier characters named Silk and Ann, from his one-shot manga Romance Dawn. In these stories, Silk and Ann were parentless and had tragic pasts. Oda designed Nami as a human girl. At first, Oda wanted Nami to use a large axe, but he replaced it with a pole-based weapon. In an early concept of the Straw Hats, Nami was the only woman on the crew.

Nami is fashionable and her style changes throughout One Piece. She was first introduced wearing a white-and-blue striped shirt, an orange mini-skirt and orange boots. Throughout the series, Nami is commonly seen wearing a shirt or bikini top, a skirt and high-heeled sandals. Nami often wears blue tattoos throughout the course of the series; the first is a symbol of Arlong's crew which is later removed and replaced with a symbol of a tangerine and pinwheel on her left bicep. Eventually, Nami starts wearing earrings and has her hair, once just barely shoulder-length, grown down to the middle of her back, while usually wearing bikini tops with blue jeans. Concerning her ethnic appearance, Oda revealed that he imagines Nami to be of Swedish nationality, albeit in a real-world context.

=== Portrayals ===
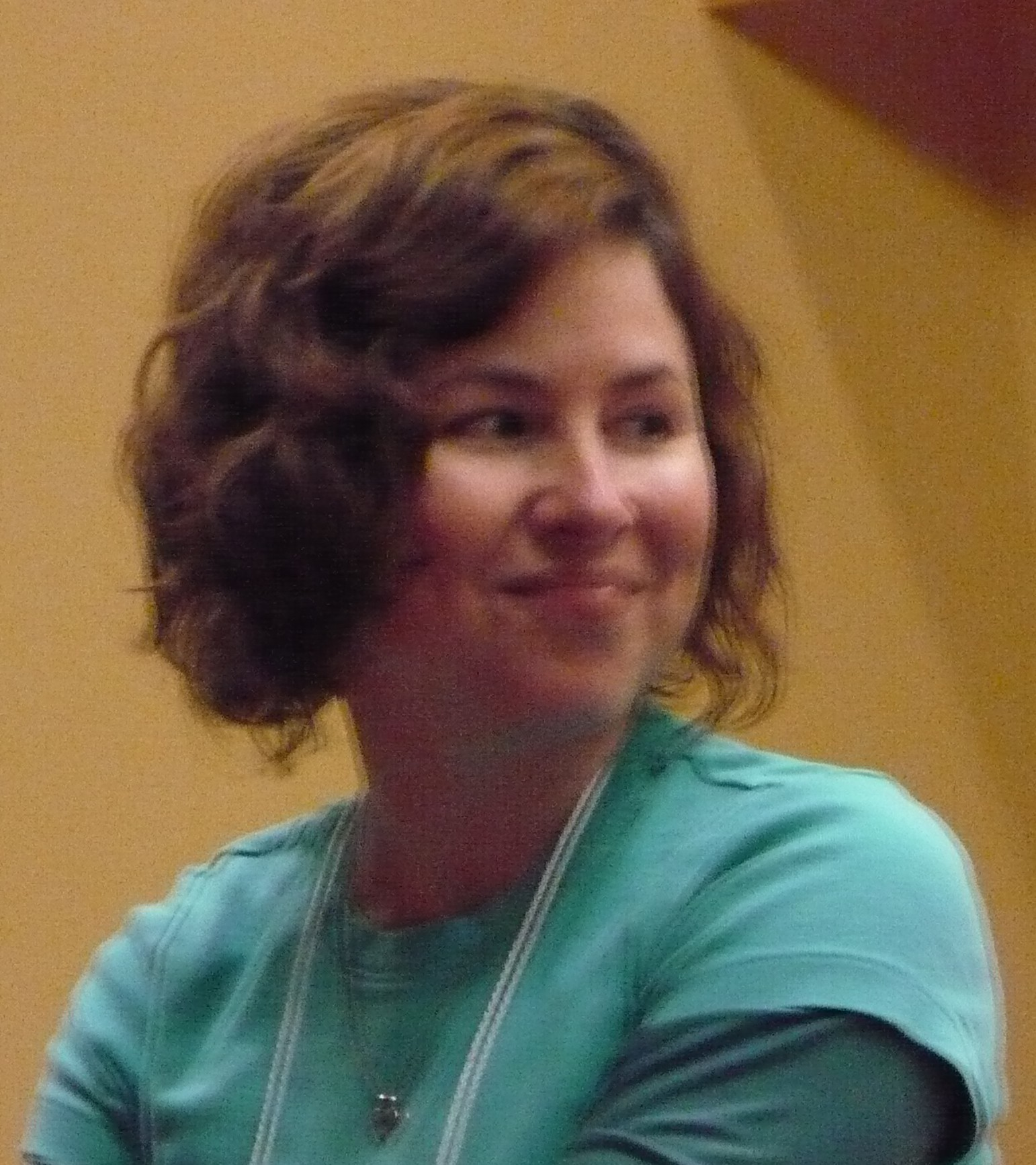
Luci Christian voiced Nami in the Funimation English dub of the anime series.

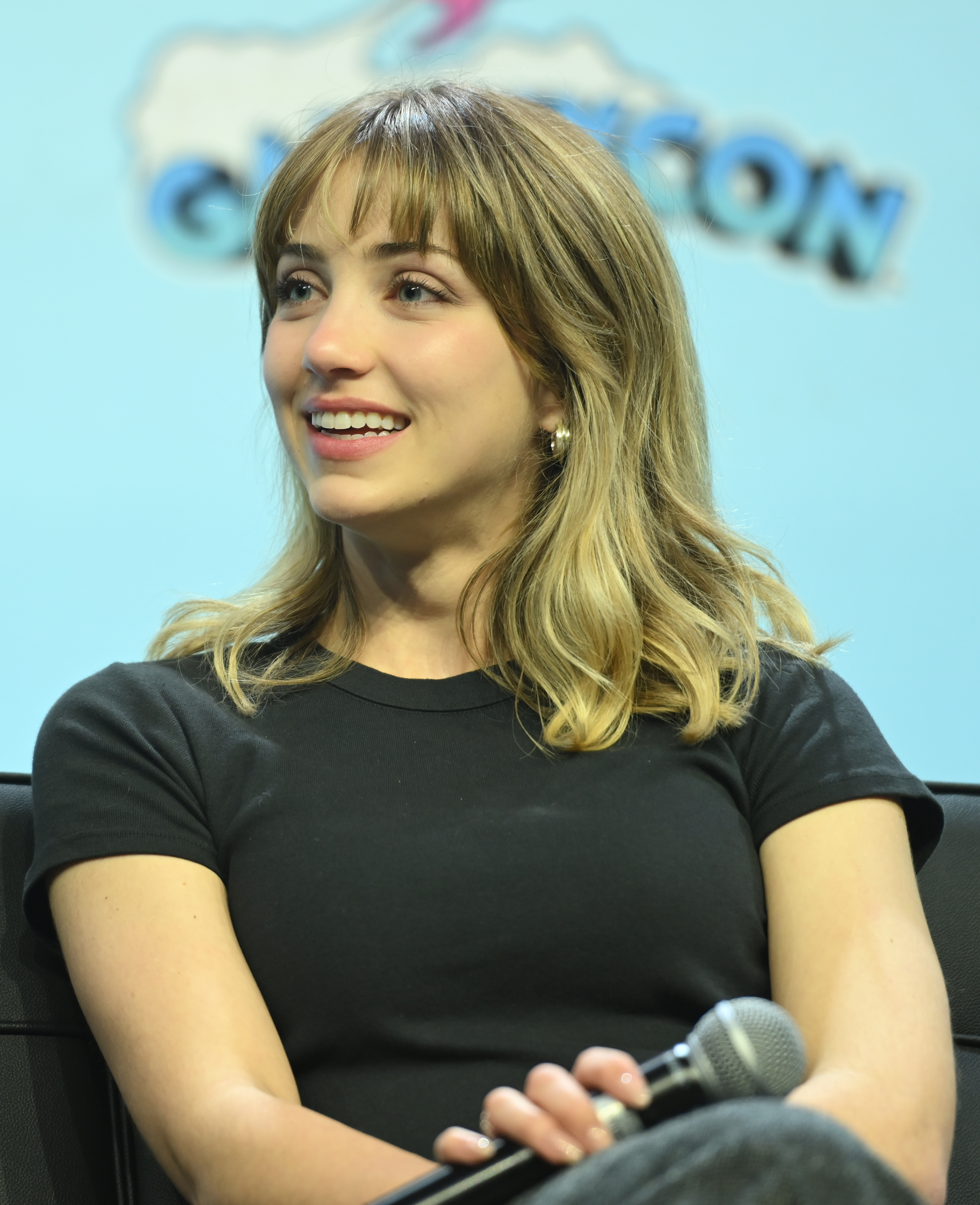
Emily Rudd portrays Nami in the live action series.

In the Japanese version of the One Piece anime series, and related media, Nami has been voiced by Akemi Okamura. In 2001, Okamura temporarily left the series due to her pregnancy; Wakana Yamazaki acted as a substitute for episodes 70–78. In the OVA Defeat the Pirate Ganzack!, Nami was voiced by Megumi Toyoguchi. In 4Kids Entertainment's dub of the anime, Nami is voiced by Kerry Williams. In Funimation Entertainment's dub of the anime, Nami is voiced by Luci Christian.

Nami is portrayed by Emily Rudd in the live action adaptation of One Piece, while Lily Fisher portrays her at age ten and Sophie Ellenbogen portrays her as a toddler.

== Characteristics ==
Nami can tell climate changes and draw sea charts. She is also proficient as a pickpocket. During the early part of the series, Nami possesses a three-sectioned bo staff until Usopp creates a variation of her staff, known as the Clima-Tact (天候棒(クリマ・タクト), Kuraima Takuto; renamed "Climate Baton" in Viz Media's manga translation and "Weather Forcer" in 4Kids' anime dub), which can control the weather at will. Later, Usopp upgrades her weapon to the Perfect Clima-Tact (完全版 "天候棒"(パーフェクト･クリマ･タクト), Pāfekuto Kurima Takuto; renamed "Perfected Climate Baton" in the Viz Media manga translation and "Complete Clima-Tact" in Funimation's anime dub), using Dials to increase her attacks.

Eventually, Nami adds the Sorcery Clima-Tact (Sorcery Climate Baton in the Viz manga and Funimation subs) with Weatheria's technology, which not only has improved abilities, but can also be used for other uses such as producing Milky Clouds for riding across. As with her original staff, these three weapons are also tri-sectional. Later, Usopp gives Nami an improved Sorcery Clima-Tact model she wanted him to make (which he had Franky help him a little bit). Using the knowledge he acquired over the time-skip with the plant-based Pop Greens, Usopp combined this with the Weatheria technology Nami provided him and designed the new Sorcery Clima-Tact to be smaller and more compact than the previous models. Instead, it uses the Pop Greens' growth abilities for the staff to extend and contract, through the use of squeezing or releasing the handle. This improvement also allows Nami to now be able to directly attack with her staff from a distance. Nami later teamed up with Big Mom's thundercloud-based accomplice Zeus, eventually forcing him to become her servant, and is currently part of her arsenal, now living inside her Clima-Tact. Though Zeus' body was later destroyed by his former master, his soul was able to survive and has now completely merged with the Clima-Tact, improving its capabilities and giving it shape-changing abilities, such as transforming it into a mace.

== Appearances ==
=== In One Piece ===
Nami first appears in the manga chapter "Nami" (ナミ登場, Nami Tōjō), first published in Japan's Weekly Shōnen Jump magazine on September 15, 1997. She is introduced as a thief who robs treasure from pirates, and partners with Luffy and Zoro after joining forces to obtain a map of the Grand Line from the clown-like pirate Buggy. As the crew defends the seafaring restaurant Baratie from Don Krieg's pirates, Nami learns of a bounty on the fish-man pirate Arlong and departs with the crew's ship and accumulated treasure, intending to buy back her home village Cocoyashi from Arlong's control.

The crew learns of Nami's past from her adoptive sister Nojiko: Nami and Nojiko were orphaned infants rescued from a war-torn kingdom and adopted by the Marine Bellemere, who raised them as her own. As a child, Nami developed a love for cartography and navigation, dreaming of mapping the entire world. One day, Arlong and his crew invaded Cocoyashi, and Bellemere sacrificed herself to spare Nami and Nojiko. Arlong kidnapped Nami upon discovering her talent for cartography and forced her to chart maps for him, while promising that the village would be freed for 100,000,000 berries. Nami was driven for the following eight years to rob from pirates in order to buy back her village. When Nami's loot is confiscated by a corrupt Marine, she learns that Arlong has been bribing the Navy into ignoring his crimes, and she turns to Luffy in her despair. When the crew defeats Arlong, Nami officially joins the crew, and they enter the Grand Line.

At Whiskey Peak, the crew agrees to escort the princess Nefertari Vivi to Alabasta. While fending off pursuers of Vivi on Little Garden, Nami is bitten by a poisonous tick and falls ill, forcing a detour to Drum Island. Afterward, Nami requests a weapon – the Clima-Tact – from the crew's sniper Usopp, which she uses to defeat Miss Doublefinger in Alabasta. When the crew rescues their archaeologist Nico Robin at Enies Lobby, Nami receives a bounty along with the rest of the crew. In Thriller Bark, Nami is kidnapped by the zombie Absalom, who tries to force her to marry him. Nami is saved by the zombie Lola, who later gives Nami her mother's Vivre Card, a piece of paper representing the owner's soul.

After being separated from the crew by Bartholomew Kuma, Nami ends up on the floating island Weatheria, where she masters the meteorological arts, and she reunites with Luffy and the others two years later. On Fish-Man Island, Nami forgives and comforts the former World Government Warlord Jimbei over his release of Arlong and fights a new crew of fish-man pirates. On Punk Hazard, Nami is abducted, resolves rescue the children being used in Caesar's experiments, undergoes body swaps with her crewmates via the World Government Warlord Trafalgar Law's power, and prevents Caesar's escape with Usopp's help. In Dressrosa, Nami guards the Thousand Sunny, is briefly turned into abstract art by Giolla of the Donquixote Pirates, and is forced to head for Zou when the Big Mom Pirates appear. Following the Dressrosa incident, her bounty increases along with those of the rest of the crew.

On Zou, she aids the devastated Minks, earns their gratitude, and joins the mission to recover the crew's cook Sanji after Capone Bege of the Big Mom Pirates takes him. On Whole Cake Island, Nami encounters Big Mom's children Brulee and Cracker as well as the "homies", a race of sentient animals, plants and objects. Upon learning that Big Mom is Lola's mother, she uses Big Mom's Vivre Card to command the homies and weaken Cracker's "Biscuit Soldiers". Nami is rescued from imprisonment in Mont-d'Or's book by Jimbei, helps rescue the crew's musician Brook, escapes Big Mom's collapsing castle, and acquires the homies Kingbaum and Zeus as servants. In Wano, operating as the kunoichi "Onami", she aids Robin's escape, delivers a message to Kin'emon, engages with the Beast Pirates Ulti and Page One, and defeats Ulti with Zeus after he permanently bonds with Nami's Clima-Tact. Following the events on Wano, her bounty rises again. On Egghead, she stands with the crew against Saint Saturn to protect Robin.

=== In other media ===
Nami has made several appearances in other media, including, but not limited to, every One Piece video game to date. She has also appeared in crossover games, including Jump Super Stars, Jump Ultimate Stars, and Battle Stadium D.O.N.. In addition to her in-game appearances, Nami has also been featured and mentioned in some songs. "Music" features Nami singing about herself listening to music while chasing her dreams. "Between the Wind" features Nami singing about weather and drawing sea charts.

== Reception ==
Nami ranked in the Top 10 of all three Shōnen Jump character popularity polls.^{[vol. 7:148 (ja),]}^{[vol. 24:206–209 (ja),]}^{[vol. 43:214–219 (ja)]} Her backstory has been found to be a "touching story" as it "unfolds with a lot of emotion" by Mania Entertainment writer, Jarred Pine. Pine also mentioned Nami was his favorite character from the series, and satisfied with how the manga showed her past. While reviewing the eighth DVD from Viz Media, Activeanime mentioned Nami is one of the best characters from the series as "She's got guts, smarts, and can heft a mean punch when needed". Like Pined, Activeanime liked Nami's background and added that his "itty bitty heart went out to her." Nami was ranked as #28 in a survey conducted by Newtype Japan for Favorite Anime Heroine in 2002. In the SPJA 2008, Nami was nominated in the category "Best Female Character." At the 10th Crunchyroll Anime Awards in 2026, Marisa Marciel was nominated in the "Best Voice Artist Performance (Castilian)" category for her performance as Nami, but lost to Carles Teruel's Akaza.

== See also ==
- Straw Hats
- List of One Piece characters
