= List of One Piece media =

- Created by: Eiichirō Oda
- Original work: One Piece (1997 – present)

Print publications
- Book(s): List of books
- Novel(s): List of novels
- Comics: List of comics
- Comic strip(s): Straw Hat Theater (2005–12)
- Magazine(s): One Piece Magazine (2017–25)

Films and television
- Film(s): List of films
- Short film(s): List of shorts
- Television series: One Piece (2023–present)
- Web series: Koisuru One Piece (2025)
- Animated series: One Piece (1999–present); One Piece: Heroines (2026)
- Television special(s): List of television specials

Theatrical presentations
- Play(s): List of plays
- Musical(s): One Piece Sound Banquet: East Blue Arc (2018)

Games
- Video game(s): List of video games

Audio
- Soundtrack(s): List of soundtracks

Miscellaneous
- Theme park attraction(s): Tokyo One Piece Tower

Official website
- http://one-piece.com

One Piece is a Japanese media franchise created by Eiichirō Oda in 1997. The initial manga, written and illustrated by Eiichirō Oda, has been serialized in Shueisha's Weekly Shōnen Jump magazine since July 22, 1997, and has been collected into 111 tankōbon volumes. By March 2026, the manga has sold over 600 million copies worldwide, making it the best-selling manga series in history. It became the best-selling manga for the eleventh consecutive year in 2018.

The manga has been adapted into a festival film produced by Production I.G in 1998, an anime series produced by Toei Animation, which began broadcasting in Japan in 1999, and a live-action series produced by Tomorrow Studios, released by Netflix in 2023, while an anime series produced by Wit Studio is scheduled to premiere in 2027. Additionally, Toei has developed 15 animated feature films, original video animations, and 13 television specials. Several companies have developed various types of merchandise like trading card games and numerous video games. In addition, there has been other material released based on the franchise, such as spin-off manga, light novels, anime comics, artbooks, soundtracks, databooks, magazines, attractions, and theatrical plays.

== Manga ==
=== Ongoing series ===
| No. | Title | Run | Creator | Serialization | Volumes | Chapters | Schedule | Note | Ref(s) |
|---|---|---|---|---|---|---|---|---|---|
| 1 | One Piece | July 19, 1997 – present | Eiichirō Oda | Weekly Shonen Jump | 113 | 1164 | Weekly | Inaugural media | |
| 2 | Chopperman: Go Go! Everyone's Chopper-sensei (チョッパーマン ゆけゆけ! みんなのチョッパー先生 Choppāman: Yuke Yuke! Minna no Choppā-sensei) | December 3, 2010 - October 7, 2011 | Hirofumi Takei | Saikyo Jump | 1 | 4 | Quarterly | Spin-off | |
| 3 | Chopperman (チョッパーマン Choppāman) | December 3, 2011 - January 4, 2014 | Hirofumi Takei | Saikyo Jump | 5 | 25 | Monthly | Spin-off | |
| 4 | One Piece Party (ワンピースパーティー Wan Pīsu Pātī) | December 5, 2014 – February 2, 2021 | Ei Andō | Saikyo Jump | 7 | 34 | Bi-monthly | Spin-off | |
| 5 | Chin Piece (チンピース Chin Pīsu) | June 1, 2018 – April 2, 2020 | Yoshikazu Amami | Saikyo Jump | 2 | 12 | Bi-monthly | Spin-off | |
| 6 | Koisuru One Piece (恋するワンピース Koisuru Wan Pīsu) | June 18, 2018 – present | Daiki Ihara | Shounen Jump+ | 9 | 141 | Weekly | Spin-off; Indefinite hiatus since November 7, 2021 | |
| 7 | One Piece: Kobiyama Who Looks Like Koby - Two Piece in a Pod (ONE PIECE コビー似の小日山～ウリふたつなぎの大秘宝～ Wan Pīsu Kobī ni no Kobiyama～Urifutatsu Nagi no Ōhihō～) | June 18, 2018 – July 1, 2019 | Nakamaru | Shounen Jump+ | 3 | 47 | Weekly | Spin-off | |
| 8 | Shokugeki no Sanji (食戟のサンジ Shokugeki no Sanji) | July 23, 2018 – July 25, 2022 | Yūto Tsukuda, Shun Saeki | Weekly Shonen Jump | 1 | 7 | | Spin-off | |
| 9 | Fischer's x One Piece - Search for the 7 Treasures (Fischer's×ONE PIECE 7つなぎの大秘宝 Fisshāzu Wan Pīsu: Nanatsunagi no Daihihōu) | August 3, 2018 – present | Semimaro Aburakouji | Saikyo Jump | 3 | 21 | | Spin-off | |
| 10 | One Piece School (ONE PIECE学園 Wan Pīsu Gakuen) | August 2, 2019 – present | Sōhei Kōji | Saikyo Jump | 7 | 36 | Monthly | Spin-off | |
| 11 | One Piece episode A | September 16, 2020 – December 2, 2021 | Ryo Ishiyama, Boichi | One Piece Magazine | 2 | 4, + 2 one-shots by Boichi | | Side story | |

=== Limited series ===
| No. | Title | Run | Author | Issues | Publisher | Schedule | Note |
|---|---|---|---|---|---|---|---|
| 1 | One Piece Omake | 1999–2017 | Eiichiro Oda | 13 | Various, Shueisha | Random | Yonkoma shorts No formal announcement of completion |
| 2 | One Piece Movie: Dead End Adventure (劇場版ONE PIECE デッドエンドの冒険) | 2003 | N/A | 2 | Shueisha | One-time release | Adaption of One Piece The Movie: Dead End no Bōken |
| 3 | One Piece Movie: Curse of the Sacred Sword (劇場版ONE PIECE —呪われた聖剣—) | 2004 | N/A | 2 | Shueisha | One-time release | Adaption of One Piece: The Cursed Holy Sword |
| 4 | One Piece Film: STRONG WORLD (ONE PIECE FILM: STRONG WORLD ワンピース フィルム ストロング ワールド) | 2010 | N/A | 2 | Shueisha | One-time release | Adaption of One Piece Film: Strong World |
| 5 | ONE PIECE FILM Z (ワンピース フィルム ゼット) | 2013 | N/A | 2 | Shueisha | One-time release | Adaption of One Piece Film: Z |
| 6 | ONE PIECE FILM GOLD (ワンピース フィルム ゴールド) | 2017 | N/A | 2 | Shueisha | One-time release | Adaption of One Piece Film: Gold |
| 7 | Special Episode "Luff" | 2017 | Eiichiro Oda | 3 | Shueisha | Monthly | "What if?" story |
| 8 | A Big Fan of One Piece | 2017 | Semimamo Aburakouji, Nakamaru | 4 | Shueisha | Monthly | "Day in the life" of One Piece superfan, Kenji Kamiki |
| 9 | Eyes of Eiichiro's Staff | 2017 | Haruto Ikezawa, Ei Andō, Yusaku Shibata | 3 | Shueisha | Monthly | "Day in the life" of One Piece editors |
| 10 | ONE PIECE STAMPEDE | 2020 | N/A | 2 | Shueisha | One-time release | Adaptation of One Piece: Stampede |
| 11 | ONE PIECE FILM RED | 2023 | N/A | 2 | Shueisha | One-time release | Adaptation of One Piece Film: Red |

=== One shots ===
| No. | Title | Release date | Author | Pages | Publisher | Note |
|---|---|---|---|---|---|---|
| 1 | Monsters | October 30, 1994 | Eiichiro Oda | 45 | Shueisha | First published in Shonen Jump Autumn Special and part of the 1998 Wanted anthology. The protagonist Ryuma and this story retroactively became part of the One Piece canon in the Thriller Bark arc. Confirmed in the FAQ (SBS) section of volume 47. |
| 2 | One Piece Movie: The Giant Mechanical Soldier of Karakuri Castle (ONE PIECE THE MOVIE カラクリ城のメカ巨兵) | 2006 | N/A | 352 | Shueisha | Adaption of the film One Piece: The Giant Mechanical Soldier of Karakuri Castle |
| 3 | One Piece Movie: Episode of Alabasta: The Desert Princess and the Pirates (劇場版ONE PIECE エピソード オブ アラバスタ 砂漠の王女と海賊たち) | 2008 | N/A | 352 | Shueisha | Adaption of One Piece Movie: The Desert Princess and the Pirates: Adventures in Alabasta |
| 4 | One Piece The Movie: Episode of Chopper Plus: Bloom in Winter, Miracle Sakura (ONE PIECE THE MOVIE エピソード オブ チョッパー+ 冬に咲く、奇跡の桜) | 2009 | N/A | 368 | Shueisha | Adaption of One Piece The Movie: Episode of Chopper Plus: Bloom in Winter, Miracle Cherry Blossom |
| 5 | Chapter 0 | 2009 | Eiichiro Oda | 23 | Shueisha | Special chapter released with manga chapter 565, a prequel to One Piece Film: Strong World. Collected in Databook 5, and adapted into an OVA |
| 6 | Memories with Oda-san (尾田さんとの思い出漫画! Oda-san to no omoide-manga!) | July 15, 2017 | Mitsutoshi Shimabukuro | 15 | Shueisha | Special chapter to commemorate One Piece's 20th anniversary |
| 7 | One Piece Short! (ONE PIECEショート！ Wan Pīsu Shōto!) | December 25, 2017 | Nakamaru, Tatsuya Suganuma, Ryosuke Sonoda, Masahiro Hirakata, Tadaichi Nakama, Daiki Ihara | 24 | Shueisha | Six short One Piece parody stories |
| 8 | Roronoa Zoro Falls Into the Sea | July 22, 2019 | Boichi | 46 | Shueisha | Cover Comic 1 one-shot covering the Zoro vs. Mihawk battle, collected in One Piece episode A volume 1 |
| 9 | My Plans Never Fail!! (おれの計画は絶対に狂わない!! Ore no keikaku wa zettai ni kuruwanai!!) | August 9, 2019 | Ryo Nakama | 5 | Shueisha | Special chapter to commemorate the film One Piece: Stampede |
| 10 | One Piece 1000 Story Memorial (ONE PIECE 1000話記念! 特別番外編 Wan Pīsu Sen-wa Kinen Tokubetsu Bangai-hen) | January 4, 2021 | Various | 22 | Shueisha | A series of short stories by the authors of Weekly Shonen Jump. Commemorates One Piece chapter 1000 |
| 11 | Vivi's Adventure (ビビの冒険) | August 30, 2021 | Naoshi Komi | 48 | Shueisha | Cover Comic 2 one-shot covering Vivi's departure |
| 12 | Nami vs. Kalifa (ナミvsカリファ) | April 5, 2022 | Boichi | 50 | Shueisha | Cover Comic 3 one-shot covering the Nami vs. Kalifa battle, collected in One Piece episode A volume 2 |

=== Comic strips ===
| Title | Run | Creator | Volumes | Chapters | Publisher | Schedule | Note |
|---|---|---|---|---|---|---|---|
| Straw Hat Theater | November 30, 2005 - December 4, 2012 | Eiichiro Oda | 1 | 13 | Shueisha | Random | Published in One Piece databooks, Collected on September 16, 2020 as Straw Hat Grand Theater |

=== Collected editions ===
| No. | Collection | Format | Volumes | Publisher | Schedule | Note | Ref(s) |
|---|---|---|---|---|---|---|---|
| 1 | One Piece tankōbon releases | Tankōbon | 111 | Shueisha | Random | Original in Japanese | |
| 2 | One Piece tankōbon digitally colored version releases | Tankōbon | 99 | Shueisha | Random | Original in Japanese | |
| 3 | One Piece three-in-one collections series | Omnibus | 33 | Viz Media | Random | Original in English | |
| 4 | One Piece Log Books | Jump | 28 | Shueisha | Random | Original in Japanese | |

== Anime ==
=== Television ===
==== Ongoing series ====
| Title | Medium | Run | Original network | Production company | Seasons | Episodes | Ref(s) |
|---|---|---|---|---|---|---|---|
| One Piece | Animation | 1999 – present | FNS (Fuji TV) | Toei Animation | 22 | 1167 | |

==== Upcoming series ====
| Title | Medium | Run | Original network | Production company | Seasons | Episodes | Ref(s) |
|---|---|---|---|---|---|---|---|
| One Piece: Heroines | Animation | TBA | TBA | TBA | 1 | TBA | |
| The One Piece | Animation | TBA | Netflix | Wit Studio | 2 | TBA | |

==== Specials ====
| No. | Title | Airdate | Length | Ref(s) |
|---|---|---|---|---|
| 1 | One Piece TV Special: Adventure in the Ocean's Navel (Wan Pīsu Terebi Supesharu: Umi no Heso no Daibōken" (ワンピース TVスペシャル 海のヘソの大冒険) | December 20, 2000 | 50 minutes | |
| 2 | One Piece: Open Upon the Great Sea! A Father's Huge, HUGE Dream (Wan Pīsu: Daiunabara ni Hirake! Dekkai Dekkai Chichi no Yume!" (ワンピース 大海原にひらけ!でっかいでっカイ父の夢!) | April 6, 2003 | 46 minutes | |
| 3 | "One Piece: Protect! The Last Great Stage" "Wan Pīsu: Mamoru! Saigo no Daibutai" (ワンピース 守れ!最後の大舞台) | December 14, 2003 | 46 minutes | |
| 4 | "One Piece: End-of-Year Special Plan! Chief Straw Hat Luffy's Detective Story" "Wan Pīsu: Nenmatsu Tokubetsu Kikaku! Mugiwara no Rufi Oyabun Torimonochō" (ワンピース年末特別企画!麦わらのルフィ親分捕物帖) | December 18, 2005 | 42 minutes | |
| 5 | "Episode of Nami: Tears of a Navigator and the Bonds of Friends" "Episōdo obu Nami: Kōkaishi no Namida to Nakama no Kizuna" (エピソードオブナミ ～航海士の涙と仲間の絆～) | August 25, 2012 | 1 hr 46 min | |
| 6 | "Episode of Luffy: Adventure on Hand Island" "Episōdo obu Rufi – Hando Airando no Bōken" (エピソードオブルフィ ～ハンドアイランドの冒険～) | December 15, 2012 | 1 hr 42 min | |
| 7 | "Episode of Merry: The Tale of One More Friend" "Episōdo obu Merī: Mō Hitori no Nakama no Monogatari" (エピソードオブメリー ～もうひとりの仲間の物語～) | August 24, 2013 | 1 hr 46 min | |
| 8 | "~~3D~~2Y: Overcome Ace's Death! Luffy's Vow to his Friends" "~~Surī-Dī~~ Tsū-Wai: Ēsu no Shi o Koete! Rufi Nakama to no Chikai" (〝~~3D~~2Y〟 エースの死を越えて! ルフィ仲間との誓い) | August 30, 2014 | 1 hr 47 min | |
| 9 | "Episode of Sabo: The Three Brothers' Bond – The Miraculous Reunion and the Inherited Will" "Episōdo obu Sabo: San-Kyōdai no Kizuna – Kiseki no Saikai to Uketsugareru Ishi" (エピソードオブサボ 〜3兄弟の絆 奇跡の再会と受け継がれる意志〜) | August 22, 2015 | 1 hr 46 min | |
| 10 | "One Piece: Adventure of Nebulandia" "Wan Pīsu: Adobenchā obu Neburandia" (ワンピース アドベンチャー オブ ネブランディア) | December 19, 2015 | 1 hr 46 min | |
| 11 | "One Piece: Heart of Gold" "Wan Pīsu: Hāto obu Gōrudo" (ワンピース ハートオブ ゴールド) | July 23, 2016 | 1 hr 44 min | |
| 12 | "One Piece: Episode of East Blue: Luffy and His 4 Crewmates' Big Adventure" "Wan Pīsu: Episōdo obu Īsuto Burū: ~Rufi to Yo-nin no Nakama no Dai-bōken~" (ワンピース エピソードオブ東の海（イーストブルー）～ルフィと4人の仲間の大冒険～) | August 26, 2017 | 1 hr 46 min | |
| 13 | "One Piece: Episode of Sky Island" "Wan Pīsu: Episōdo obu Sorajima" (ワンピース エピソードオブ空島) | August 25, 2018 | 2 hr 10 min | |

=== Films ===
| No. | Title | Release date | Director | Writer | Box Office | |
| No. | Title | Release date | Director | Writer | Japan | Other territories |
|---|---|---|---|---|---|---|
| 1 | One Piece: The Movie | March 4, 2000 | Junji Shimizu | Michiru Shimada | ¥2,160,000,000 | |
| 2 | Clockwork Island Adventure | March 3, 2001 | Junji Shimizu | Michiru Shimada | ¥3,000,000,000 | |
| 3 | Chopper's Kingdom on the Island of Strange Animals | March 2, 2002 | Junji Shimizu | Michiru Shimada | ¥2,000,000,000 | |
| 4 | Dead End Adventure | March 1, 2003 | Konosuke Uda | Yoshiyuki Suga | ¥2,000,000,000 | $22,989 |
| 5 | The Cursed Holy Sword | March 6, 2004 | Kazuhisa Takenouchi | Yoshiyuki Suga | ¥1,800,000,000 | |
| 6 | Baron Omatsuri and the Secret Island | March 5, 2005 | Mamoru Hosoda | Masahiro Itō | ¥1,200,000,000 | $28,298 |
| 7 | Giant Mecha Soldier of Karakuri Castle | March 4, 2006 | Kōnosuke Uda | Masahiro Itō | ¥900,000,000 | $271,529 |
| 8 | The Desert Princess and the Pirates: Adventures in Alabasta | March 3, 2007 | Takahiro Imamura | Hirohiko Kamisaka | ¥900,000,000 | $14,967 |
| 9 | Episode of Chopper Plus: Bloom in the Winter, Miracle Cherry Blossom | March 1, 2008 | Junji Shimizu | Hirohiko Kamisaka | ¥920,000,000 | $34,995 |
| 10 | One Piece Film: Strong World | December 12, 2009 | Munehisa Sakai | Hirohiko Kamisaka | ¥4,800,000,000 | $1,078,971 |
| 11 | Straw Hat Chase | March 19, 2011 | Hiroyuki Satō | Yasuyuki Tsutsumi | ¥790,000,000 | |
| 12 | One Piece Film: Z | December 15, 2012 | Tatsuya Nagamine | Osamu Suzuki | ¥6,870,000,000 | $2,636,587 (Note: One Piece: Film Z: Hong Kong & Taiwan – $1,382,211; Philippines, Singapore, Thailand – $681,794; South Korea – ₩626,891,000 ($572,580)) |
| One Piece television specials Korea theatrical release | | 2014 | | | | $47,725 |
| 13 | One Piece Film: Gold | July 23, 2016 | Hiroaki Miyamoto | Tsutomu Kuroiwa | ¥5,180,000,000 | $18,724,464 (Note: One Piece: Film Gold: China – $15.8 million; South Korea – ₩1,710,761,100 ($1,276,424); North America, France, Italy, Spain, New Zealand, Thailand – $1,319,785; Australia – $91,294) |
| Regional total | | | | | ¥32,520,000,000 ($390,260,900) | $26,343,492 |
| 14 | One Piece: Stampede | August 9, 2019 | Takashi Otsuka | Atsuhiro Tomioka, Takashi Otsuka | $94,684,223 (Note: One Piece Stampede: Worldwide (as of Nov 13, 2019) – ¥10 billion ($93,000,000); After Nov 13, 2019 - All BOM tracked territories – $1,684,223) | |
| 15 | One Piece Film: Red | August 6, 2022 | Gorō Taniguchi | Tsutomu Kuroiwa | ¥19,700,000,000 | |
| Worldwide total | | | | | $511,304,974 | |

==== Shorts ====
| No. | Title | Medium | Release date | Production company | Length | Attached to |
|---|---|---|---|---|---|---|
| 1 | Jango's Dance Carnival | Animation | March 3, 2001 | Toei Animation | 5 minutes and 30 seconds | Clockwork Island Adventure |
| 2 | Dream Soccer King | Animation | March 2, 2002 | Toei Animation | 5 minutes and 30 seconds | Chopper's Kingdom on the Island of Strange Animals |
| 3 | One Piece: The Adventure in Grand Line | Animation | July 6, 2002 | Toei Animation | 20 minutes | N/A |
| 4 | Take Aim! The Pirate Baseball King | Animation | March 6, 2004 | Toei Animation | 5 minutes and 30 seconds | The Cursed Holy Sword |
| 5 | ONE PIECE 3D! Trap Coaster | Animation | December 1, 2011 | Toei Animation | 12 minutes | N/A |
| 6 | The Great Treasure of Tongari Island | Animation | April 21, 2018 | Toei Animation | 11 minutes | Luffy's Endless Adventure |
| 7 | Luffy, Law | Animation | January 19, 2025 | Toei Animation | 5 minutes | N/A |

=== Others ===
| No. | Title | Length | Airdate | Production company | Note | Ref(s) |
|---|---|---|---|---|---|---|
| 1 | "Defeat Him! The Pirate Ganzack!" "Taose! Kaizoku Gyanzakku" (倒せ!海賊ギャンザック) | 29 minutes | July 26, 1998 | Production I.G | Festival film shown at the 1998 Jump Super Anime Tour. Not related with the Toei Animation series and media | |
| 2 | "Emergency Planning, A Perfect Strategy for the One Piece" "Kinkyū Kikaku Wan Pīsu Kanzen Kōryakuhō" (緊急企画 ワンピース完全攻略法) | 24 minutes | December 22, 1999 | Toei Animation | Recap of the first five episodes of the One Piece anime, with minor changes | |
| 3 | "One Piece New Year Special: Secret of the Straw Hat Pirates!" "Otoshidama Supesharu: Mugiwara Kaizoku-dan no Himitsu!" (お年玉スペシャル 麦わら海賊団の秘密!) | 1 hour and 25 minutes | January 3, 2006 | Toei Animation | Recap of the first 363 chapters of One Piece, with a New Years' message from the Straw Hat Pirates | |
| 4 | "Romance Dawn Story" "Romansu Dōn Sutōrī" (ロマンス ドーン ストーリー) | 33 minutes | September 21, 2008 | Toei Animation | Festival film shown at the 2008 Jump Super Anime Tour | |
| 5 | "Strong World: Episode 0" "Sutorongu Wārudo: Episōdo Zero" (ストロングワールド Episode 0) | 18 minutes | December 12, 2009 | Toei Animation | Animated version of Chapter 0, and prequel to One Piece Film: Strong World | |
| 6 | "Infiltrate!! Thousand Sunny" | 12 minutes | March 4, 2011 | Toei Animation | A bonus DVD included with the home release of the film Straw Hat Chase | |
| 7 | "Glorious Island" Part 1 | 5 minutes | December 23, 2012 | Toei Animation | Prequel to One Piece Film: Z, released for smartphones | |
| 8 | "Glorious Island" Part 2 | 5 minutes | December 30, 2012 | Toei Animation | Prequel to One Piece Film: Z, released for smartphones | |
| 9 | Dream 9 Toriko & One Piece & Dragon Ball Z Super Collaboration Special!! | | April 7, 2013 | Toei Animation | Crossover special, Episode 590 of One Piece anime | |
| 10 | "One Piece: Long Ring Long Land Arc - A One Night Abridged Special" "Wan Pīsu ~ Rongu Ringu Rongu Rando-hen ~ ichiya kagiri no tokubetsu henshū-ban" (ワンピース～ロングリングロングランド編～ 一夜限りの特別編集版) | 1 hour and 15 minutes | December 11, 2015 | Toei Animation | Recap of the Long Ring Long Land Arc, aired in preparation of the One Piece: Adventure of Nebulandia TV special | |
| 11 | "One Piece Characters Log" "Wan Pīsu Kyarakutāzu Log" (ワンピース キャラクターズLog) | 30 minutes per episode | June 19, 2016 - September 11, 2016 | Toei Animation | A series of recaps narrated by Bartolomeo, covering the Straw Hat Pirates' backstories. Includes 9 episodes, each covering a different Straw Hat. | |
| 12 | "One Piece Film: Gold Episode 0" | 10 minutes | July 2, 2016 | Toei Animation | Prequel to One Piece Film: Gold, released for smartphones | |
| 13 | "ROMANCE DAWN" | 24 minutes | October 20, 2019 | Toei Animation | Special adaptation, Episode 907 of One Piece anime | |
| 14 | "Monsters: 103 Mercies Dragon Damnation" "Monsutāzu: Ippyakusanjō Hiryū Jigoku" (MONSTERS 一百三情飛龍侍極) | 24 minutes | January 21, 2024 | E&H Production | Adaptation of the one-shot Monsters | |

== Live-action series ==
| Title | Run | Seasons | Episodes | Production company(s) | Network | Ref(s) |
|---|---|---|---|---|---|---|
| One Piece | 2023 – present | 2 | 16 | Tomorrow Studios | Netflix | |

== Video games ==
| No. | Title | Original release date (JP) | Platform(s) | Ref(s) |
|---|---|---|---|---|
| 1 | From TV Animation - One Piece: Become the Pirate King! | July 19, 2000 | WonderSwan | |
| 2 | From TV Animation - One Piece: Grand Battle! | March 15, 2001 | PlayStation | |
| 3 | From TV Animation - One Piece: Birth of Luffy's Dream Pirate Crew! | April 27, 2001 | Game Boy Color | |
| 4 | From TV Animation - One Piece: Set Sail Pirate Crew! | August 2, 2001 | PlayStation | |
| 5 | From TV Animation - One Piece: Legend of the Rainbow Island | September 13, 2001 | WonderSwan Color | |
| 6 | From TV Animation - One Piece: Treasure Wars | January 3, 2002 | WonderSwan Color | |
| 7 | From TV Animation - One Piece: Grand Battle! 2 | March 20, 2002 | PlayStation | |
| 8 | From TV Animation - One Piece: Grand Line Dream Adventure Log | June 28, 2002 | Game Boy Color | |
| 9 | From TV Animation - One Piece: Grand Battle Swan Colosseum | July 12, 2002 | WonderSwan Color | |
| 10 | From TV Animation - One Piece: Treasure Battle! | November 1, 2002 | GameCube | |
| 11 | From TV Animation - One Piece: Big Secret Treasure of the Seven Phantom | November 15, 2002 | Game Boy Advance | |
| 12 | From TV Animation - One Piece: Treasure Wars 2 Welcome to Buggyland | December 20, 2002 | WonderSwan Color | |
| 13 | From TV Animation - One Piece: Aim! The King of Berry | March 28, 2003 | Game Boy Advance | |
| 14 | From TV Animation - One Piece: Ocean's Dream! | May 1, 2003 | PlayStation | |
| 15 | From TV Animation - One Piece: Chopper's Big Adventure | October 16, 2003 | WonderSwan Color | |
| 16 | One Piece: Grand Battle! 3 | December 11, 2003 | GameCube | |
| 17 | One Piece: Going Baseball | March 11, 2004 | Game Boy Advance | |
| 18 | One Piece: Round the Land | July 29, 2004 | PS2 | |
| 19 | One Piece: Grand Battle! Rush | March 17, 2005 | GameCube, PS2 | |
| 20 | One Piece: Dragon Dream | April 28, 2005 | Game Boy Advance | |
| 21 | One Piece | September 7, 2005 | Game Boy Advance | |
| 22 | Fighting for One Piece | September 8, 2005 | PS2 | |
| 23 | One Piece: Pirates' Carnival | November 23, 2005 | GameCube, PS2 | |
| 24 | One Piece: Grand Adventure | August 29, 2006 (NA) | GameCube, PS2 | |
| 25 | One Piece: Unlimited Adventure | April 26, 2007 | Wii | |
| 26 | One Piece: Gear Spirit | August 30, 2007 | Nintendo DS | |
| 27 | One Piece: Unlimited Cruise: Episode 1 | September 11, 2008 | Wii | |
| 28 | One Piece: Unlimited Cruise: Episode 2 | February 26, 2009 | Wii | |
| 29 | One Piece: Gigant Battle! | September 9, 2010 | Nintendo DS | |
| 30 | One Piece Unlimited Cruise SP | May 26, 2011 | Nintendo 3DS | |
| 31 | One Piece: Gigant Battle! 2 New World | November 17, 2011 | Nintendo DS | |
| 32 | One Piece: Pirate Warriors | March 1, 2012 | PS3 | |
| 33 | One Piece: Romance Dawn | December 20, 2012 | PlayStation Portable, Nintendo 3DS | |
| 34 | One Piece: Pirate Warriors 2 | March 20, 2013 | PS3, Vita | |
| 35 | One Piece: Unlimited World Red | November 21, 2013 | Nintendo 3DS, PS3, PS4, Vita, Wii U, Windows, Switch | |
| 36 | One Piece: Super Grand Battle! X | November 13, 2014 | Nintendo 3DS | |
| 37 | One Piece: Pirate Warriors 3 | March 26, 2015 | PS3, PS4, Vita, Windows, Switch | |
| 38 | One Piece: Burning Blood | April 21, 2016 | PS4, Vita, Xbox One, Windows | |
| 39 | One Piece: Great Pirate Colosseum | September 21, 2016 | Nintendo 3DS | |
| 40 | One Piece Grand Cruise | May 23, 2018 | PlayStation 4, PlayStation VR | |
| 41 | One Piece: World Seeker | March 15, 2019 | PS4, Xbox One, Windows | |
| 42 | One Piece: Pirate Warriors 4 | March 26, 2020 | PS4, Xbox One, Windows, Switch | |
| 43 | One Piece Odyssey | January 13, 2023 | PS4, PS5, Windows, Xbox One, Xbox Series X/S | |

=== Mobile games ===
| No. | Title | Release | Note | Ref(s) |
|---|---|---|---|---|
| 1 | One Piece Grand Collection | 2012 | Not in operation | |
| 2 | One Piece Straw Wars Pirates Defence | | Not in operation | |
| 3 | One Piece Grand Quiz Battle | | Not in operation | |
| 4 | One Piece Moja! | | Not in operation | |
| 5 | One Piece Run, Chopper, Run! | April 4, 2014 | Not in operation | |
| 6 | One Piece Treasure Cruise | May 12, 2014 | Available worldwide | |
| 7 | One Piece: Dance Battle | November 12, 2014 | Not in operation | |
| 8 | One Piece Set Sail | January 20, 2015 | Available only in Chinese | |
| 9 | One Piece Thousand Storm | April 21, 2016 | Available only in Japanese | |
| 10 | One Piece Bounty Rush | March 29, 2018 | Available worldwide | |
| 11 | One Piece: Burning Will | September 20, 2018 | Available only in Chinese | |
| 12 | One Piece Bon! Bon! Journey!! | March 17, 2020 | Available worldwide | |
| 13 | One Piece: The Voyage / One Piece Fighting Path (航海王热血航线测试服) | April 23, 2021 | Available only in Chinese | |

== Books ==
=== Novels ===
| No. | Title | Release date | Author | Pages | ISBN | Publisher | Note | Ref(s) |
|---|---|---|---|---|---|---|---|---|
| 1 | One Piece: Defeat Him! The Pirate Ganzack (ONE PIECE 倒せ！海賊ギャンザック) | June 3, 1999 | Tatsuya Hamazaki | 228 | 4-08-703084-9 | Shueisha | Adaptation of the OVA | |
| 2 | One Piece: Loguetown Arc (ONE PIECE ローグタウン編) | July 17, 2000 | Tatsuya Hamazaki | 244 | 4-08-703096-2 | Shueisha | Featuring deleted scenes from the Loguetown Arc that were incorporated into the anime in the same year, the Daddy Masterson subplot in episode 50 | |
| 3 | One Piece: Clockwork Island Adventure (One Piece ねじまき島の冒険) | March 19, 2001 | Tatsuya Hamazaki | 236 | 4-08-703102-0 | Shueisha | Adaptation of film | |
| 4 | One Piece: The Legend of Thousand Year Dragon (One Piece 千年竜伝説) | December 25, 2001 | Tatsuya Hamazaki | 224 | 4-08-703107-1 | Shueisha | | |
| 5 | One Piece: Chopper's Kingdom on the Island of Strange Animals (One Piece 珍獣島のチョッパー王国) | March 22, 2002 | Tatsuya Hamazaki | 228 | 4-08-703110-1 | Shueisha | Adaptation of film | |
| 6 | One Piece: Dead End Adventure (One Piece デッドエンドの冒険) | March 10, 2003 | Tatsuya Hamazaki | 228 | 4-08-703124-1 | Shueisha | Adaptation of film | |
| 7 | One Piece: Curse of the Sacred Sword (One Piece 呪われた聖剣) | March 22, 2004 | Tatsuya Hamazaki | 228 | 4-08-703137-3 | Shueisha | Adaptation of film | |
| 8 | One Piece: Baron Omatsuri and the Secret Island (One Piece オマツリ男爵と秘密の島) | March 14, 2005 | Tatsuya Hamazaki | 228 | 4-08-703153-5 | Shueisha | Adaptation of film | |
| 9 | One Piece: The Giant Mechanical Soldier of Karakuri Castle (One Piece カラクリ城のメカ巨兵) | March 6, 2006 | Tatsuya Hamazaki | 228 | 4-08-703168-3 | Shueisha | Adaptation of film | |
| 10 | King of the Pirates | January 1, 2007 | Micheal Anthony Steele | 112 | | Scholastic | Adapted from the 4Kids version of the anime | |
| 11 | The Circus Comes to Town | March 1, 2007 | Howie Dewin | 112 | | Scholastic | Adapted from the 4Kids version of the anime | |
| 12 | One Piece: Episode of Alabasta: The Desert Princess and the Pirates (One Piece エピソード オブ アラバスタ 砂漠の王女と海賊たち) | March 12, 2007 | Tatsuya Hamazaki | 224 | 978-4-08-703178-2 | Shueisha | Adaptation of film | |
| 13 | Tall Tales | 2007 | Michael Anthony Steele | 88 | | Scholastic | Adapted from the 4Kids version of the anime | |
| 14 | Pirate Attack | 2007 | Michael Anthony Steele | 85 | | Scholastic | Adapted from the 4Kids version of the anime | |
| 15 | Recipe For Disaster | 2007 | Michael Anthony Steele | 90 | | Scholastic | Adapted from the 4Kids version of the anime | |
| 16 | One Piece: Episode of Chopper Plus: Bloom in Winter, Miracle Sakura (One Piece エピソードオブチョッパー+ 冬に咲く、奇跡の桜) | February 25, 2008 | Tatsuya Hamazaki | 240 | 978-4-08-703190-4 | Shueisha | Adaptation of film | |
| 17 | One Piece Film: Strong World (One Piece Film Strong World [ストロング ワールド]) | December 14, 2009 | Tatsuya Hamazaki | 208 | 978-4-08-703219-2 | Shueisha | Adaptation of film | |
| 18 | One Piece 3D: Straw Hat Chase (One Piece 麦わらチェイス ゲキジョウバン ワンピース) | March 22, 2011 | Tatsuya Hamazaki | 192 | 978-4-08-703241-3 | Shueisha | Adaptation of film | |
| 19 | One Piece Film: Z (One Piece Film Z [ワンピース フィルム ゼット]) | December 17, 2012 | Tatsuya Hamazaki | 256 | 978-4-08-703285-7 | Shueisha | Adaptation of film | |
| 20 | One Piece "3D2Y" (ONE PIECE "3D2Y"エースの死を越えて！ ルフィ仲間との誓い) | October 3, 2014 | Tatsuya Hamazaki | 240 | 978-4-08-703331-1 | Shueisha | Adaptation of TV special | |
| 21 | One Piece Film: Gold (One Piece Film Gold [ワンピース フィルム ゴールド]) | July 25, 2016 | Tatsuya Hamazaki | 244 | 978-4-08-703398-4 | Shueisha | Adaptation of film | |
| 22 | 『ONE PIECE』に学ぶ最強ビジネスチームの作り方 | July 26, 2017 | | 242 | 978-4-08-786087-0 | Shueisha | | |
| 23 | One Piece novel: Straw Hat stories (ONE PIECE novel 麦わらストーリーズ) | November 2, 2017 | Tomohito Ohsaki | 208 | 978-4-08-703434-9 | Shueisha | | |
| 24 | One Piece novel A (ONE PIECE novel A スペード海賊団結成篇 1) | April 4, 2018 | Shou Hinata | 176 | 978-4-08-703445-5 | Shueisha | Adapted into a manga by Boichi | |
| 25 | One Piece novel A (ONE PIECE novel A 新世界篇 2) | June 4, 2018 | Tatsuya Hamazaki | 240 | 978-4-08-703449-3 | Shueisha | Adapted into a manga by Boichi | |
| 26 | One Piece: Stampede (劇場版 ONE PIECE STAMPEDE) | August 9, 2019 | Tatsuya Hamazaki | 276 | 978-4-08-703482-0 | Shueisha | Adaptation of film | |
| 27 | One Piece: Law | April 3, 2020 | Akinari Sakagami | 272 | 978-4-08-703495-0 | Shueisha | | |
| 28 | One Piece: Heroines | June 4, 2021 | Jun Esaka | 180 | 978-4-08-703510-0 | Shueisha | | |
| 29 | One Piece Film: Red | August 9, 2022 | Jun Esaka, Tsutomu Kuroiwa | 228 | 978-4-08-703523-0 | Shueisha | Adaptation of film | |

=== Databooks ===
| No | Title | Release date | Pages | ISBN | Publisher | Ref(s) |
|---|---|---|---|---|---|---|
| 1 | One Piece Red: Grand Characters (ワンピース レッド グランド キャラクターズ Wan Pīsu Reddo Gurando Kyarakutāzu) | January 5, 2002 | 226 | 978-4088732114 | Shueisha | |
| 2 | One Piece Blue: Grand Data File (ワンピース ブルー グランドデータファイル) | August 2, 2002 | 196 | 978-4088733586 | Shueisha | |
| 3 | One Piece Yellow: Grand Elements (ワンピース イエロー グランド エレメンツ Wan Pīsu Ierō Gurando Erementsu) | April 2, 2007 | 300 | 978-4088740980 | Shueisha | |
| 4 | One Piece Green: Secret Pieces | November 4, 2010 | 394 | 978-4-08-874848-1 | Shueisha | |
| 5 | One Piece Blue Deep: Characters World | March 2, 2012 | 298 | 978-4-08-870445-6 | Shueisha | |
| 6 | Vivre Card - One Piece Visual Dictionary (VIVRE CARD～ONE PIECE図鑑～) | September 4, 2018 - present | | 978-4-08-908320-8 | Shueisha | |

=== Color Walks ===
| No. | Title | Release date | Pages | ISBN | Publisher | Ref(s) |
|---|---|---|---|---|---|---|
| 1 | One Piece Color Walk 1 | July 19, 2001 | 104 | 978-4088592176 | Shueisha | |
| 2 | One Piece Color Walk 2 | November 4, 2003 | 106 | 978-4088593760 | Shueisha | |
| 3 | One Piece Color Walk 3 Lion | January 5, 2005 | 106 | 978-4088595382 | Shueisha | |
| 4 | One Piece Color Walk 4 Eagle | May 4, 2010 | 104 | 978-4087822670 | Shueisha | |
| 5 | One Piece Color Walk 5 Shark | December 3, 2010 | 104 | 978-4087823561 | Shueisha | |
| 6 | One Piece Color Walk 6 Gorilla | January 4, 2014 | 104 | 978-4-08-782747-7 | Shueisha | |
| 7 | One Piece Color Walk 7 Tyrannosaurus | July 4, 2016 | 104 | 978-4-08-792509-8 | Shueisha | |
| 8 | One Piece Color Walk 8 Wolf | March 2, 2018 | 114 | 978-4-08-792523-4 | Shueisha | |
| 9 | One Piece Color Walk 9 Tiger | September 16, 2020 | 112 | 978-4087925579 | Shueisha | |
| 10 | One Piece Color Walk Compendium: East Blue to Skypiea | July 3, 2018 | 312 | 978-1-4215-9850-5 | Viz Media | |
| 11 | One Piece Color Walk Compendium: Water Seven to Paramount War | October 1, 2019 | 312 | 978-1-4215-9851-2 | Viz Media | |

=== Animation logbooks ===
| No. | Title | Release date | Pages | ISBN | Publisher | Ref(s) |
|---|---|---|---|---|---|---|
| 1 | One Piece Animation Logbook | February 25, 2002 | 168 | 978-4088592916 | Shueisha | |
| 2 | One Piece Rainbow! | May 1, 2007 | 288 | 978-4088740997 | Shueisha | |
| 3 | One Piece White! | August 3, 2012 | 288 | 978-4-08-870576-7 | Shueisha | |

=== Special volumes ===
| No. | Title | Release date | Pages | Publisher | Note | Ref(s) |
|---|---|---|---|---|---|---|
| 1 | One Piece Volume 0 "Strong World" | December 12, 2009 | 85 | Shueisha | Tie-in to the film One Piece Film: Strong World | |
| 2 | One Piece Volume 1000 "Z" | December 15, 2012 | 84 | Shueisha | Tie-in to the film One Piece Film: Z | |
| 3 | One Piece Volume 777 | July 23, 2016 | | Shueisha | Tie-in to the film One Piece Film: Gold | |
| 4 | One Piece Volume 794 | | | Shueisha | A guide to the One Piece x Kyoto event | |
| 5 | One Piece Volume 333 | March 9, 2018 | | Shueisha | Tie-in to the Tokyo One Piece Tower | |
| 6 | One Piece Volume 10089 | August 9, 2019 | 81 | Shueisha | Tie-in to the film One Piece: Stampede | |
| 7 | One Piece Volume 4000000000 "RED" | August 6, 2022 | | Shueisha | Tie-in to the film One Piece Film: Red | |

=== Others ===
| No. | Title | Release date | Pages | ISBN | Publisher | Note | Ref(s) |
|---|---|---|---|---|---|---|---|
| 1 | One Piece Grand Paper Adventure 3D | June 1, 2007 | 12 | 978-4087804676 | Shueisha | | |
| 2 | One Piece 10th Treasures | July 27, 2007 | | | Shueisha | | |
| 3 | One Piece Film STRONG WORLD Eiichiro Oda Artbook | December 18, 2009 | 120 | 978-4087822519 | Shueisha | Artbook by Oda Eichiro | |
| 4 | One Piece Strong Words Vol. 1 of 2 | March 9, 2011 | 206 | 978-4087205824 | Shueisha | Quote book written by Uchida Tatsuru | |
| 5 | One Piece Strong Words Vol. 2 of 2 | April 1, 2011 | 222 | 978-4087205879 | Shueisha | Quote book written by Uchida Tatsuru | |
| 6 | ONE PIECE 海賊キャラ弁当BOOK (FLOWER&BEE BOOK) | 2011/9/12 | | 4081021295 | Shueisha | The franchises first cook book | |
| 7 | One Piece 15th Anniversary: Dive to Grand World | August 6, 2012 | 35 | | Shueisha | | |
| 8 | One Piece Pirate Recipes: Sanji's Gut-Stuffers (サンジの満腹ごはん Sanji no manpuku gohan) | November 28, 2012 | 96 | 978-4-08-780658-8 | Shueisha | Cook book | |
| 9 | One Piece 500 Quiz Book | March 4, 2014 | 230 | 978-4-08-880099-8 | Shueisha | | |
| 10 | One Piece 500 Quiz Book 2 | September 4, 2014 | 230 | 978-4-08-880253-4 | Shueisha | | |
| 11 | One Piece Strong Words 2 (ONE PIECE STRONG WORDS 2 Wan Pīsu Sutorongu Wāzu Sekando) | March 4, 2014 | | 978-4-08-720728-6 | Shueisha | Quote book written by Uchida Tatsuru | |
| 12 | ONE PIECE BURNING BLOOD BURNING BATTLE BOOK | April 21, 2016 | 192 | 978-4-08-779738-1 | Shueisha | | |
| 13 | ONE PIECE picture book | March 2, 2018 | 64 | 978-4-08-780835-3 | Shueisha | | |
| 14 | One Piece Doors! 1 | June 4, 2018 | 288 | 978-4-08-881559-6 | Shueisha | Cover page collection | |
| 15 | One Piece Doors! 2 | June 4, 2018 | 288 | 978-4-08-881560-2 | Shueisha | Cover page collection | |
| 16 | One Piece: World Seeker Guide | March 14, 2019 | 160 | 978-4-08-779773-2 | Shueisha | Game guide book | |
| 17 | One Piece Doors! 3 | October 4, 2019 | 272 | 978-4-08-882098-9 | Shueisha | Cover page collection | |

== Magazines ==
| Publication | Issue | Release date | Pages | ISBN | Sales | Publisher | Ref(s) |
|---|---|---|---|---|---|---|---|
| One Piece Magazine | Vol.1 | July 7, 2017 | 170 | 978-4081022328 | | Shueisha | |
| One Piece Magazine | Vol.2 | August 4, 2017 | 170 | 978-4081022335 | | Shueisha | |
| One Piece Magazine | Vol.3 | September 1, 2017 | 170 | 978-4081022342 | | Shueisha | |
| One Piece Magazine | Vol.4 | October 19, 2018 | 148 | 978-4-08-102273-1 | | Shueisha | |
| One Piece Magazine | Vol.5 | January 25, 2019 | 156 | 978-4-08-102274-8 | | Shueisha | |
| One Piece Magazine | Vol.6 | June 17, 2019 | 164 | 978-4-08-102275-5 | 63,093 (Week 3) | Shueisha | |
| One Piece Magazine | Vol.7 | August 9, 2019 | 172 | 978-4-08-102294-6 | 58,323 (Week 2) | Shueisha | |
| One Piece Magazine | Vol.8 | December 13, 2019 | 172 | 978-4-08-102401-8 | | Shueisha | |
| One Piece Magazine | Vol.9 | April 24, 2020 | 172 | 978-4-08-102404-9 | | Shueisha | |
| One Piece Magazine | Vol.10 | September 16, 2020 | 202 | 978-4-08-102406-3 | | Shueisha | |
| One Piece Magazine | Vol.11 | February 4, 2021 | 204 | 978-4-08-102407-0 | | Shueisha | |
| One Piece Magazine | Vol.12 | September 2, 2021 | 180 | 978-4-08-102409-4 | | Shueisha | |
| One Piece Magazine | Vol.13 | December 2, 2021 | 188 | 978-4-08-102411-7 | | Shueisha | |
| One Piece Magazine | Vol.14 | April 5, 2022 | 196 | 978-4-08-102412-4 | | Shueisha | |
| One Piece Magazine | Vol.15 | August 8, 2022 | 172 | 978-4-08-102414-8 | | Shueisha | |
| One Piece Magazine | Vol.16 | March 2, 2023 | 164 | 978-4-08-102417-9 | | Shueisha | |
| One Piece Magazine | Vol.17 | September 4, 2023 | 172 | 978-4-08-102420-9 | | Shueisha | |
| One Piece Magazine | Vol.18 | June 4, 2024 | 180 | 978-4-08-102423-0 | | Shueisha | |
| One Piece Magazine | Vol.19 | December 4, 2024 | 220 | 978-4-08-102426-1 | | Shueisha | |
| One Piece Magazine | Vol. 20 | June 4, 2025 | 132 | 978-4-08-102434-6 | | Shueisha | |

== Plays ==
| No. | Name | Run | Locality | Note | Ref(s) |
|---|---|---|---|---|---|
| 1 | One Piece Premier Show | 2007 – present | Universal Studios Japan | | |
| 2 | One Piece Pirate Sweeping Operation | 2012–2013 | Universal Studios Japan | | |
| 3 | Chopper Man Show | 2013–2014 | Various (Japan) | | |
| 4 | One Piece Water Battle | 2014–2018 | Universal Studios Japan | | |
| 5 | Super Kabuki II: One Piece | 2015–2018 | Various (Japan) | | |
| 6 | One Piece Live Attraction | 2015–2020 | Tokyo Tower | | |
| 7 | One Piece Sound Banquet: East Blue Arc | 2018 | Tokyo International Forum | Musical | |

== Music ==
| No. | Year | Title | Release date | Tracks | Label | Notes | Ref(s) |
|---|---|---|---|---|---|---|---|
| 1 | 2000 | ONE PIECE MUSIC & SONG Collection | Mar 18, 2000 | 25 | Nippon Columbia | | |
| 2 | 2000 | ONE PIECE MUSIC & SONG Collection 2 | Sep 21, 2000 | 20 | Nippon Columbia | | |
| 3 | 2000 | ONE PIECE MUSIC & SONG Collection 3 | Dec 21, 2000 | 22 | Nippon Columbia | | |
| 4 | 2001 | ONE PIECE "The Adventure in Nejimaki Island" MUSIC FILE | Mar 14, 2001 | 32 | Avex | | |
| 5 | 2001 | ONE PIECE MUSIC & BEST SONG Collection | Jul 20, 2001 | 19 | Nippon Columbia | | |
| 6 | 2001 | ONE PIECE Grand Battle! 2 - Music & Song Collection | Dec 21, 2001 | 37 | Nippon Columbia | | |
| 7 | 2002 | ONE PIECE THE MOVIE Chinjuujima no Chopper Oukoku Music Collection | Mar 13, 2002 | 36 | Avex | Movie OST | |
| 8 | 2003 | One Piece: Oceans of Dreams! Shudaika | Feb 05, 2003 | 4 | Avex | | |
| 9 | 2003 | ONE PIECE THE MOVIE The Dead End Adventure MUSIC COLLECTION | Mar 05, 2003 | 29 | Avex | Movie OST | |
| 10 | 2003 | One Piece | Jun 13, 2003 | 14 | BMG Ariola | | |
| 11 | 2003 | ONE PIECE BEST ALBUM - One Piece Shudaikashuu | Jul 30, 2003 | 14 | Avex | | |
| 12 | 2003 | A to Z - One Piece Edition / ZZ | Nov 12, 2003 | 6 | Avex | | |
| 13 | 2004 | BON VOYAGE! / BON-BON BLANCO | Jan 14, 2004 | 4 | Nippon Columbia | | |
| 14 | 2004 | ONE PIECE THE MOVIE Norowareta Seiken Soundtrack | Mar 10, 2004 | 52 | Avex | Movie OST | |
| 15 | 2005 | ONE PIECE THE MOVIE OMATSURI DANSHAKU TO HIMITSU NO SHIMA | Mar 02, 2005 | 27 | Avex | Movie OST | |
| 16 | 2005 | ONE PIECE BEST ALBUM One Piece Shudaikashuu 2nd Piece / Limited Edition | Mar 24, 2005 | Disc 1 - 12 Disc 2 - 5 | Avex | | |
| 17 | 2006 | ONE PIECE THE MOVIE Karakurijou no Mecha Kyohei | Mar 01, 2006 | 39 | Avex | Movie OST | |
| 18 | 2007 | From TV animation ONE PIECE Eizou Ongaku Kanzenban | Jan 31, 2007 | Disc 1 - 22 Disc 2 - 23 Disc 3 - 22 | Nippon Columbia | | |
| 19 | 2007 | ONE PIECE THE MOVIE "Episode of Alabasta: Sabaku no Oujo to Kaizokutachi" | Feb 21, 2007 | 55 | Avex | Movie OST | |
| 20 | 2007 | ONE PIECE 10TH ANNIVERSARY ~SUPER BEST | Mar 07, 2007 | Disc 1 - 14 Disc 2 - 14 Disc 3 - 3 | Avex | | |
| 21 | 2008 | ONE PIECE Chopper Special CD!! | Feb 27, 2008 | Disc 1 - 41 Disc 2 - 14 | Avex | Movie OST | |
| 22 | 2009 | One Piece: Binks's Booze | Mar 25, 2009 | 6 | Avex | | |
| 23 | 2009 | ONE PIECE Brook Special CD Brook to Mugiwara no Ichimi no Ongakukai | Apr 01, 2009 | 13 | Avex | | |
| 24 | 2009 | ONE PIECE FILM STRONG WORLD ORIGINAL SOUNDTRACK | Dec 09, 2009 | 34 | Avex | Movie OST | |
| 25 | 2010 | ONE PIECE MEMORIAL BEST / Limited Edition | Mar 17, 2010 | Disc 1 - 16 Disc 2 - 17 Disc 3 - 3 | Avex | | |
| 26 | 2011 | ONE PIECE NEW WORLD BGM | Nov 23, 2011 | 5 | Avex | | |
| 27 | 2012 | ONE PIECE: KAIZOKU MUSOU ORIGINAL SOUNDTRACK | Mar 01, 2012 | 10 | NAMCO BANDAI Games | Video Game OST | |
| 28 | 2012 | ONE PIECE FILM Z ORIGINAL SOUNDTRACK | Dec 12, 2012 | 30 | Sony Music Japan International | Movie OST | |
| 29 | 2013 | ONE PIECE 15th Anniversary Best Album | Jan 16, 2013 | Disc 1 - 15 Disc 2 - 12 Disc 3 - 11 | Avex | | |
| 30 | 2013 | ONE PIECE: PIRATE WARRIORS 2 ORIGINAL SOUNDTRACK | Mar 20, 2013 | 13 | NAMCO BANDAI Games | Video Game OST | |
| 31 | 2013 | ONE PIECE BGM BEST SELECTION | Jul 26, 2013 | 44 | Avex | | |
| 32 | 2013 | ONE PIECE BGM COLLECTION - NEW WORLD | Aug 14, 2013 | 15 | Avex | | |
| 33 | 2014 | Wake up! - AAA / Limited Edition | Jul 02, 2014 | Disc 1 - 4 Disc 2 - 2 | Avex | | |
| 34 | 2015 | ONE PIECE NIPPON JUUDAN! 47 CRUISE CD | Jan 28, 2015 | Albums - 47 Tracks - 94 | Avex | | |
| 35 | 2015 | Liberator/Afureru Mono / Goodbye holiday [ONE PIECE Edition] | Oct 28, 2015 | 2 | Avex | | |
| 36 | 2016 | ONE PIECE NIPPON JUUDAN! 47 CRUISE CD - Collection | Feb 24, 2016 | Albums - 4 Tracks - 52 | Avex | | |
| 37 | 2016 | ONE PIECE Arrange Collection CLASSIC | Mar 30, 2016 | 10 | Avex | | |
| 38 | 2016 | ONE PIECE Arrange Collection ROCK | Mar 30, 2016 | 10 | Avex | | |
| 39 | 2016 | ONE PIECE Arrange Collection EUROBEAT | Mar 30, 2016 | 10 | Avex | | |
| 40 | 2016 | ONE PIECE Arrange Collection EDM | Mar 30, 2016 | 10 | Avex | | |
| 41 | 2016 | ONE PIECE Original Soundtrack "New World" | Jul 20, 2016 | Disc 1 - 33 Disc 2 - 33 | Avex | Anime OST | |
| 42 | 2016 | One Piece Character Song Best "Festival" | Jul 20, 2016 | Disc 1 - 17 Disc 2 - 19 Disc 3 - 15 | Avex | | |
| 43 | 2016 | ONE PIECE FILM GOLD Original Soundtrack | Jul 27, 2016 | Disc 1 - 23 Disc 2 - 36 | Avex | Movie OST | |
| 44 | 2017 | ONE PIECE: Big Mom's Music Concert | Jul 19, 2017 | Disc 1 - 10 Disc 2 - 2 | Avex | Anime OST | |
| 45 | 2018 | ONE PIECE WE ARE! Song Complete | Feb 28, 2018 | 14 | Avex | | |
| 46 | 2018 | ONE PIECE Island Song Collection | Aug 24, 2018 | Disc 1 - 14 Disc 2 - 13 | Avex | | |
| 47 | 2019 | ONE PIECE CharacterSong AL | Jan 25, 2019 | Albums - 9 | Avex | | |
| 48 | 2019 | ONE PIECE MUSIC MATERIAL / Limited Edition | Feb 22, 2019 | Disc - 5 | Avex | | |
| 49 | 2019 | ONE PIECE WORLD SEEKER ORIGINAL SOUNDTRACK | Mar 15, 2019 | Disc 1 - 22 Disc 2 - 34 | Avex | Video Game OST | |
| 50 | 2019 | ONE PIECE 20th Anniversary BEST ALBUM / Limited Edition | Mar 27, 2019 | Disc 1 - 13 Disc 2 - 15 Disc 3 - 10 | Avex | | |
| 51 | 2019 | OVER THE TOP | September 25, 2019 | | Avex | Anime opening | |
| 52 | 2019 | ONE PIECE STAMPEDE ORIGINAL SOUNDTRACK | October 30, 2019 | 40+ | Avex | Movie OST | |

== Miscellaneous ==
=== Theme park attractions and other establishments ===
| No. | Location | Name | Opened | Closed | Note | Ref(s) |
|---|---|---|---|---|---|---|
| 1 | Tokyo Tower, Japan | Tokyo One Piece Tower (Indoor theme park) | March 13, 2015 | July 31, 2020 | It offers several games and attractions, entertainment shows, merchandise shops, restaurants, and seasonal events and campaigns. | |

=== Restaurants ===
| No. | Location | Name | Opened | Ref(s) |
|---|---|---|---|---|
| 1 | Fuji Television headquarters, Japan | One Piece Restaurant Baratie | June 2013 (Closed now) | |
| 2 | Taipei, Taiwan | One Piece Restaurant | November 2016 | |
| 3 | Hong Kong | One Piece Restaurant | | |
