= One Piece: Stampede =

2019 anime film

- Theatrical release poster by Eiichiro Oda
- Directed by: Takashi Otsuka
- Screenplay by: Atsuhiro Tomioka; Takashi Otsuka
- Based on: One Piece by Eiichiro Oda
- Produced by: Kei Kajimoto; Yūta Kano
- Starring: Mayumi Tanaka; Kazuya Nakai; Akemi Okamura; Kappei Yamaguchi; Hiroaki Hirata; Ikue Ohtani; Yuriko Yamaguchi; Kazuki Yao; Chō; Tsutomu Isobe; Yūsuke Santamaria; Ryōta Yamasato; Fischer's
- Cinematography: Naoyuki Wada
- Edited by: Masahiro Gotō
- Music by: Kohei Tanaka
- Production company: Toei Animation
- Distributed by: Toei Company, Ltd.
- Release dates: August 1, 2019 (premiere); August 9, 2019 (Japan)
- Running time: 120 minutes
- Country: Japan
- Language: Japanese
- Box office: $94.7 million (Note: One Piece Stampede: Worldwide (as of Nov 13, 2019) – ¥10 billion ($93,000,000); After Nov 13, 2019 - All BOM tracked territories – $1,684,223)

One Piece: Stampede (Japanese: ワンピース スタンピード, Hepburn: Wan Pīsu Sutanpīdo) is a 2019 anime fantasy action-adventure film directed by Takashi Otsuka and produced by Toei Animation. It is the fourteenth feature film of the One Piece film series, based on the manga series of the same name by Eiichiro Oda, and commemorates the anime's 20th anniversary. Oda was involved with the film as creative supervisor.

One Piece Film: Stampede had its world premiere at the Osaka Station City Cinema in Osaka on August 1, 2019, and later released in Japan on August 9, 2019. It received praise for its animation, storytelling and fight sequences.

== Plot ==
The Straw Hat Pirates arrive at Delta Island for the Pirate Fest, a large pirate gathering organized by Buena Festa. Festa sends the pirates to a floating island to hunt for a treasure that belonged to the Pirate King, Gold Roger. The Straw Hats and many other pirate crews, including those from the Worst Generation as well as other past allies and enemies, set sail on a Knock Up Stream and battle each other as they race towards the treasure. However, this event is secretly set up as part of a plan between Festa and legendary pirate Douglas Bullet, who had been the most dangerous criminal in the prison Impel Down for two decades until being freed two years ago. Trafalgar Law discovers this and is attacked, but escapes onto the Thousand Sunny and warns the Straw Hats.

Nico Robin, Sanji, Tony Tony Chopper and Brook go with him to investigate, followed by the undercover Smoker. After sneaking into Festa's hideout, they discover that he has conspired with the Marines to send a Buster Call on Delta Island, which would destroy it and everyone on it. As the treasure is found, a ship arrives and destroys the floating island. The pirates fall into the bay below, where Bullet takes the treasure and challenges the members of the Worst Generation to a fight. Monkey D. Luffy and the other Worst Generation members are quickly overwhelmed by his strength and Devil Fruit powers. Bullet attempts to kill Luffy, but Usopp distracts him, causing Bullet to attack him instead. The other pirates meanwhile attempt to flee from Delta Island, but find the Marine Buster Call fleet headed toward them. As the Marines disembark and clash with the pirates, Law's group encounters Smoker in Festa's lair, and Sanji battles him while Law and Robin escape. Sanji reveals to Smoker that Festa arranged for a Buster Call to arrive; Smoker was unaware and realizes that the Marines were set up. Law and Robin run into the former Warlord Crocodile, who wants to involve Law in a plan.

Bullet confronts the Buster Call fleet and reveals his awakened Devil Fruit powers, which disassemble the fleet and the town around him and form their parts into a gigantic colossus, with which he overwhelms the pirates and Marines. Festa reveals that the treasure in Bullet's possession is an Eternal Pose that can guide ships to Laugh Tale, the location of the most famous treasure One Piece. Bullet's dream is to become Pirate King by defeating the world's strongest people, and Festa intends to use his warpath and treasure to start a new era. After hearing of Bullet's actions, Marine Fleet Admiral Sakazuki orders a second Buster Call to attack the island.

Sanji, Robin, Chopper, and Brook meet up, and the latter two split off to look for Luffy. They find Luffy and Usopp half dead, and Chopper treats them. After regaining consciousness, Luffy sets off to attack Bullet, but is overwhelmed. Boa Hancock finds Luffy, though inadvertently brings along Buggy, Smoker, Law, and Luffy's adoptive brother Sabo in the process. Law shares his plan to defeat Bullet by tearing apart his colossus, and they do battle with the pirate which Crocodile as well as a lurking Rob Lucci assist them in. Their combined attacks destroy one of its arms, and Luffy destroys the other one with Gear Fourth. Shots fired by Usopp earlier then destroy the rest of the colossus. Luffy and Bullet engage in a fistfight, and Luffy ultimately is victorious. Crocodile and Lucci attempt to obtain the Eternal Pose, but Luffy destroys it, claiming he will find the One Piece with his crew without help.

Festa mourns the failure of his plans before being defeated and captured by Sabo. Luffy reunites with his crew and they attempt to escape along with the other pirates, but are confronted by the second Buster Call fleet. However, Smoker contacts his superiors to say there is no longer a need for the Buster Call, and Sabo helps the pirates pass through the fleet safely by summoning a wall of fire. It is revealed that Roger disapproved of the Eternal Pose and threw it away, believing that the One Piece could not be obtained by someone who would rely on it. Luffy's crew is shocked that he destroyed the Eternal Pose, except for Usopp. Luffy claims that if that they had taken it, they would have missed out on many great adventures.

== Voice cast ==
=== Original characters ===
- Douglas Bullet

Voiced by: Tsutomu Isobe (Japanese); Daman Mills (English)
A former member of Gol. D Roger's pirate crew who escaped Impel Down. Bullet possesses the power of the Clank-Clank Fruit, and he is capable of utilizing Armament and Conqueror's Haki.

- Buena Festa

Voiced by: Yūsuke Santamaria (Japanese); Mick Wingert (English)
Known as "Master of Festivities", a promoter for the Pirate's World Fair who invites the Straw Hat Crew.

- Ann

Voiced by: Rino Sashihara (Japanese); Macy Anne Johnson (English)
Previously voiced by Saori Hayami in a Tokyo One Piece Tower live show in which she was a singer with the ability to create illusions.

- Donald Moderate

Voiced by: Ryōta Yamasato (Japanese); Anthony Bowling (English)

=== Returning cast ===
Character	Japanese	English
Monkey D. Luffy	Mayumi Tanaka	Colleen Clinkenbeard
Roronoa Zoro	Kazuya Nakai	Christopher R. Sabat
Nami	Akemi Okamura	Luci Christian
Usopp	Kappei Yamaguchi	Sonny Strait
Sanji	Hiroaki Hirata	Eric Vale
Tony Tony Chopper	Ikue Ōtani	Brina Palencia
Nico Robin	Yuriko Yamaguchi	Stephanie Young
Franky	Kazuki Yao	Patrick Seitz
Brook	Chō	Ian Sinclair
Trafalgar Law	Hiroshi Kamiya	Matthew Mercer
Smoker	Mahito Ōba	Greg Dulcie
Tashigi	Junko Noda	Monica Rial
Buggy	Shigeru Chiba	Mike McFarland
Galdino	Nobuyuki Hiyama	Duncan Brannan
Alvida	Yōko Matsuoka	Laurie Steele
Cabaji	Endō Moriya	Greg Ayres
Richie	Tetsu Inada	Mike McFarland
Boa Hancock	Kotono Mitsuishi	Lydia Mackay
Dracule Mihawk	Hirohiko Kakegawa	John Gremillion
Crocodile	Ryūzaburō Ōtomo	John Swasey
Perona	Kumiko Nishihara	Felecia Angelle
Sakazuki	Fumihiko Tachiki	Andrew Love
Sengoku	Tōru Ōkawa	Philip Weber
Borsalino	Ryōtarō Okiayu	Ray Hurd
Issho	Ikuya Sawaki	Charles C. Campbell
Monkey D. Garp	Hiroshi Naka	Brian Mathis
Koby	Mika Doi	Micah Solusod
Helmeppo	Kōichi Nagano	Mike McFarland
Hina	Tomoko Naka	Rachael Messer
Fullbody	Hideo Ishikawa	John Burgmeier
Jango	Kazuki Yao	Kenny Green
Sentomaru	Kazue Ikura	Greg Ayres
Rob Lucci	Tomokazu Seki	Jason Liebrecht
Wapol	Bin Shimada	Andy Mullins
Sabo	Tōru Furuya	Johnny Yong Bosch
Koala	Satsuki Yukino	Jeannie Tirado
Gold Roger	Masane Tsukayama	Sean Hennigan
Marshall D. Teach	Akio Ōtsuka	Chris Rager
Eustass Kid	Daisuke Namikawa	Justin Cook
Killer	Kenji Hamada	Leo Fabian
Jewelry Bonney	Reiko Kiuchi	Laura Wetsel
Capone Bege	Naoki Tatsuta	Kyle Hebert
Basil Hawkins	Shigenori Sōya	Taliesin Jaffe
Scratchmen Apoo	Mitsuaki Madono	Brad Venable
Urouge	Taiten Kusunoki	Major Attaway
X Drake	Eiji Takemoto	D. C. Douglas
Bartolomeo	Showtaro Morikubo	Tyson Rinehart
Cavendish	Akira Ishida	Matt Shipman
Foxy	Bin Shimada	Jonathan Brooks
Porche	Sara Nakayama	Tia Ballard
Hamburg	Hirohiko Kakegawa	Garret Storms

== Production ==
=== Development ===
The film was first announced following the broadcast of a One Piece Television special, Episode of Skypiea on August 25, 2018 and the title was announced alongside a teaser trailer on December 11, 2018. In December 2018, at Jump Festa 2019, Shueisha released several of Eiichiro Oda's new costume and character designs for the film. On February 20, 2019, a second trailer was released announcing Oda as the film's creative supervisor and featuring his characters designs for Bullet and Festa, movie original characters.

On July 31, 2019, Takashi Otsuka announced through Twitter that the film had completed production.

=== Music and soundtrack ===
External videos
- "GONG"; The official music video of the main theme song by Wanima.

The film score is composed by Kohei Tanaka. The original soundtrack, containing more than 40 tracks, was released on October 30, 2019, by Avex Trax. On June 14, 2019, it was announced that WANIMA would perform the film's theme song "GONG", which was released on July 17, 2019.

== Marketing ==
As a promotion, it was announced that the first 3 million moviegoers would receive the One Piece Comic -Kan-Banpaku manga. A two part prequel story aired as episodes 895 and 896 of the anime series in the two weeks leading up to the film's release. Collaborated with Uniqlo to release T-shirts based on films's designs. On August 3, 2019, Puma announced collaboration with One Piece, released shoes based on One Piece: Stampede on same day of the film release.

On August 26, 2019, it was announced that from August 30, 2019, five hundred thousand moviegoers would receive an exclusive DVD with voice acting bloopers from the movie and behind the Scenes.

The merchandise sales of the film have earned ¥5.5 billion in Japan.

== Release ==
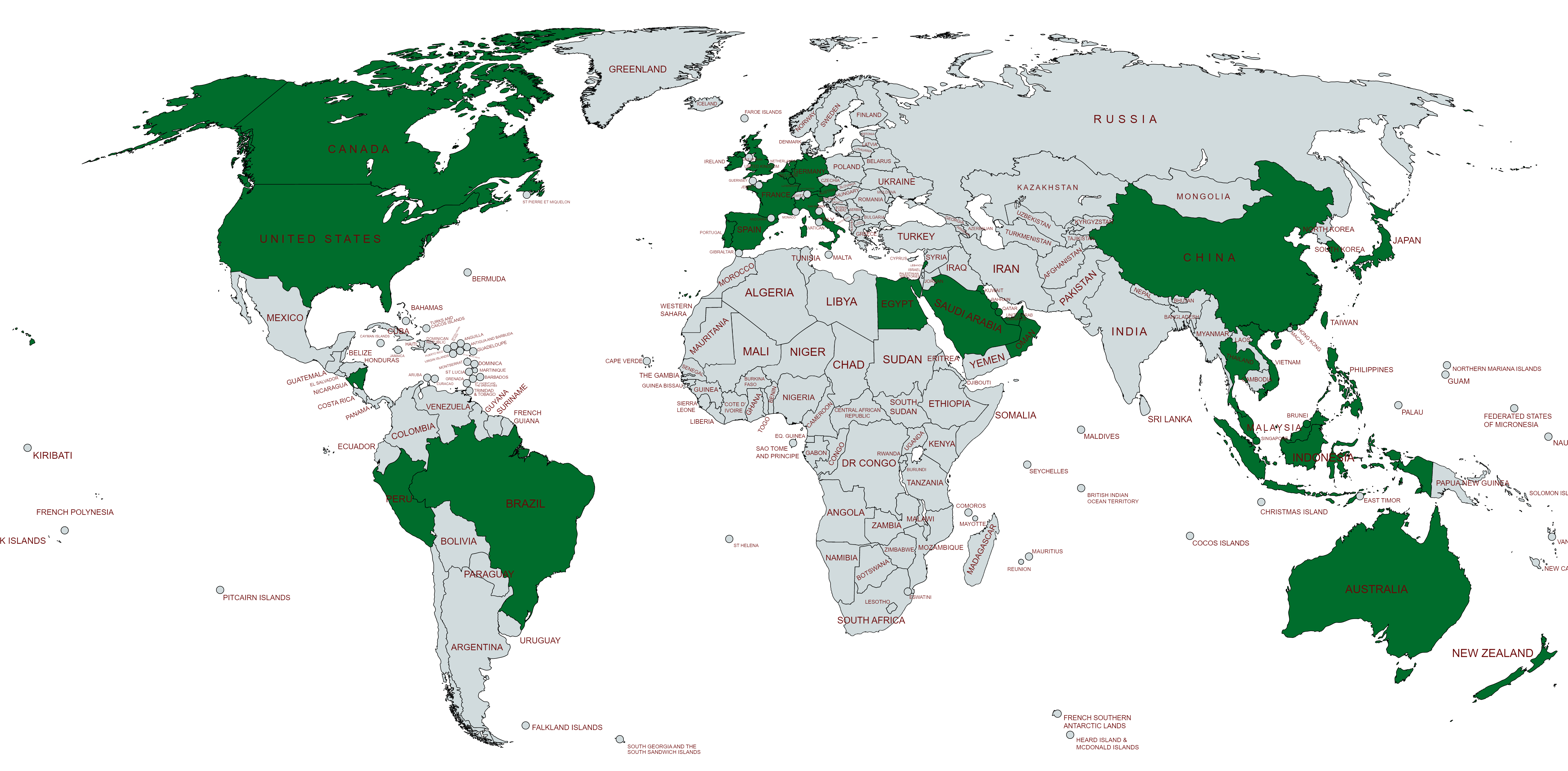
World map showing countries and regions where the movie was released theatrically (green)

The film was released in Japan on August 9, 2019, by its distributor Toei Company, on 429 screens in 352 theatres across the country.

In Asia, the film was released in Taiwan on August 21, 2019, and Neofilms released the film in Hong Kong on August 22, 2019. ODEX acquired the license to screen the film in Southeast Asia that is Singapore, Malaysia, Brunei, Indonesia and Philippines. It released the film in Singapore on September 5, 2019. Dream Express and Five Stars Agency had special previews of the film in select theaters in Thailand during September 2 to 8, 2019 and JAM released the film in Thailand nationwide on September 19, 2019. With ODEX, CBI Pictures released the film in Indonesia on September 18, 2019, GSC Movies released the film in Malaysia on September 19, 2019, The Mall Cineplex released the film in Brunei on September 19, 2019, SM Cinema released the film in Philippines on September 20, 2019. The film released in China on October 18, 2019.

In Europe, CGR Events premiered the film in France, Belgium and Luxembourg on September 12, 2019 and released in theaters on October 9, 2019, in France. Kazé screened the film in Germany and Austria on September 24, 2019, as part of the Kazé anime nights. On October 13, 2019, Stampede was screened during Scotland Loves Anime as a "mystery film", with an additional screening after its identity was announced. Koch Media released the film in Italy on October 24, 2019. Selecta Visión released the film in Spain on November 15, 2019. NOS Audiovisuais released the film in Portugal on November 28, 2019. Manga Entertainment released the film in select cinemas with both Subs and Dubs in United Kingdom on February 2, 2020.

In Australia, Madman Entertainment premiered the film in Australia on September 15, 2019, during the Madman Anime Festival with English-subtitled and Australian wide release is on November 14, 2019.

In North America, Funimation Films released the film in select theaters in United States on October 24, 29 and 31, 2019 (Sub), October 26 and 30, 2019 (Dub) and in Canada on October 25 and November 5, 2019 (Sub), October 28 and November 8, 2019 (Dub).

In Middle East, the film was released on November 14, 2019. VOX Cinemas released the film in United Arab Emirates, Cinescape released the film in Kuwait and also the film released in Oman, Saudi Arabia, Qatar and Bahrain on November 14, 2019.

== Reception ==
=== Box office ===
The film saw the largest first day attendance in Japan in 2019. It opened at number one in the Japanese box office, earning ¥1,646,321,500 (about US$15.64 million) from 1,254,372 ticket sales in its first four days. The film sold 2.31 million tickets in nine days, earning ¥3.05 billion (about US$28.7 million), making it the fastest Toei-distributed film to reach ¥3 billion milestone since 2000. As of August 25, 2019, the movie has earned ¥4,133,257,100 (about US$39 million) from 3,117,929 ticket sales in seventeen days. As of September 8, 2019, the film has earned over ¥5 billion (about US$47 million) and has sold more than 3.7 million tickets. The US box office grossed $1,298,528 as of June 12, 2020.

The film has grossed ¥5.55 billion ($50.57 million) in Japan as of December 2019, and $30.7 million in China as of 3 November 2019. As of November 13, 2019, the film earned ¥10 billion (US$93 million) worldwide.

=== Critical response ===
The review aggregator website Rotten Tomatoes reported that 94% of critics have given the film a positive review based on 16 reviews, with an average rating of 7.2/10.

== Novel adaptation ==
A novelization of the film by Tatsuya Hamazaki was released on August 9, 2019.

== See also ==
- One Piece (1999 TV series)
- List of One Piece films
- List of One Piece media
