= List of One Piece manga volumes =

First Volume of One Piece, released in Japan by Shueisha on December 24, 1997

One Piece is a Japanese manga series written and illustrated by Eiichiro Oda which has been translated into various languages and spawned a substantial media franchise, including animated and live action television series, films, video games, and associated music and merchandise. It follows the adventures of the teenaged boy and pirate captain Monkey D. Luffy, whose body gained the properties of rubber after he accidentally ate a supernatural fruit, as he travels the oceans in search of the series' titular treasure and organizes a diverse crew, named the Straw Hats.

In Japan, the series is published by Shueisha. Individual chapters have been published regularly in the shōnen manga anthology Weekly Shōnen Jump since July 22, 1997 and tankōbon format volumes (each collecting 10 to 12 chapters) have been published since December 24, 1997. The series spans over 1175 chapters and, as of March 2026, has 114 tankōbon volumes, making One Piece the 20th longest manga series by volume count.

The series has been translated and released in multiple countries. English localization began in North America, where Viz Media currently serializes One Piece in the Shonen Jump digital vault simultaneously with Japan. It originally published its English language adaptation of the series in the now-defunct monthly print anthology Shonen Jump starting with the magazine's launch in November 2002. It also publishes tankōbon format books since June 2003, which have been collected into omnibus editions incorporating three tankōbon each since December 2009; chapters and books also are published digitally through its website. In the United Kingdom, the tankōbon were published by Gollancz Manga, starting March 2006, until Viz Media took over after the fourteenth volume. In Australia and New Zealand, the English volumes have been distributed by Madman Entertainment since November 10, 2008. By October 6, 2009, only 22 volumes had been released in English. However, as announced in July 2009, Viz Media increased that number to 53 by June 2010, using an accelerated publishing schedule of five volumes per month during the first half of 2010. As of November 2025, 110 volumes of the English version have been officially released by Viz Media.

== Volumes ==
=== Volumes 1–20 ===
No.	Title	Original release date	English release date
1	Romance Dawn; Romance Dawn: Bōken no Yoake (Romance Dawn —冒険の夜明け—)	December 24, 1997; 4-08-872509-3	June 30, 2003; 1-56931-901-4
2	Buggy the Clown; Versus!! Bagī Kaizoku-Dan (Versus!! バギー海賊団)	April 3, 1998; 4-08-872544-1	November 19, 2003; 1-59116-057-X
3	Don't Get Fooled Again; Itsuwarenu Mono (偽れぬもの)	June 4, 1998; 4-08-872569-7	March 17, 2004; 1-59116-184-3
4	The Black Cat Pirates; Mikazuki (三日月)	August 4, 1998; 4-08-872594-8	July 14, 2004; 1-59116-337-4
5	For Whom the Bell Tolls; Tagatameni Kane wa Naru (誰が為に鐘は鳴る)	October 2, 1998; 4-08-872619-7	November 17, 2004; 1-59116-615-2
6	The Oath; Chikai (誓い)	December 3, 1998; 4-08-872642-1	March 1, 2005; 1-59116-723-X
7	The Crap-Geezer; Kuso Jijī (クソジジイ)	March 4, 1999; 4-08-872683-9	July 5, 2005; 1-59116-852-X
8	I Won't Die; Shinanē yo (死なねェよ)	April 30, 1999; 4-08-872712-6	October 10, 2005; 1-4215-0075-2
9	Tears; Namida (涙)	July 2, 1999; 4-08-872735-5	January 3, 2006; 1-4215-0191-0
10	OK, Let's STAND UP!	October 4, 1999; 4-08-872773-8	April 4, 2006; 1-4215-0406-5
11	The Meanest Man in the East; Higashi Ichiban no Waru (東一番の悪)	December 2, 1999; 4-08-872797-5	July 5, 2006; 1-4215-0663-7
12	The Legend Begins; Densetsu wa Hajimatta (伝説は始まった)	February 2, 2000; 4-08-872822-X	October 3, 2006; 1-4215-0664-5
13	It's All Right! Daijōbu!!! (大丈夫!!!)	April 28, 2000; 4-08-872863-7	January 2, 2007; 1-4215-0665-3
14	Instinct; Honnō (本能)	July 4, 2000; 4-08-872888-2	April 3, 2007; 1-4215-1091-X
15	Straight Ahead!!! Massugu!!! (まっすぐ!!!)	September 4, 2000; 4-08-873009-7	August 7, 2007; 1-4215-1092-8
16	Carrying on His Will; Uketsugareru Ishi (受け継がれる意志)	December 4, 2000; 4-08-873045-3	November 6, 2007; 1-4215-1093-6
17	Hiruluk's Cherry Blossoms; Hiruruku no Sakura (ヒルルクの桜)	February 2, 2001; 4-08-873073-9	March 4, 2008; 1-4215-1511-3
18	Ace Arrives; Ēsu Tōjō (エース登場)	April 4, 2001; 4-08-873100-X	June 3, 2008; 1-4215-1512-1
19	Rebellion; Uneri (反乱)	July 4, 2001; 4-08-873133-6	October 7, 2008; 1-4215-1513-X
20	Showdown at Alubarna; Kessen wa Arubāna (決戦はアルバーナ)	September 4, 2001; 4-08-873158-1	February 3, 2009; 1-4215-1514-8

=== Volumes 21–40 ===
No.	Title	Original release date	English release date
21	Utopia; Risōkyō (理想郷)	December 4, 2001; 4-08-873194-8	June 2, 2009; 978-1-4215-2429-0
22	Hope!!	February 4, 2002; 4-08-873222-7	October 6, 2009; 1-4215-2430-9
23	Vivi's Adventure; Bibi no Bōken (ビビの冒険)	April 4, 2002; 4-08-873252-9	December 1, 2009; 978-1-4215-2844-1
24	People's Dreams; Hito no Yume (人の夢)	July 4, 2002; 4-08-873282-0	January 5, 2010; 1-4215-2845-2
25	The 100 Million Berry Man; Ichioku no Otoko (一億の男)	September 4, 2002; 4-08-873313-4	January 5, 2010; 1-4215-2846-0
26	Adventure on Kami's Island; Kami no Shima no Bōken (神の島の冒険)	December 4, 2002; 4-08-873336-3	January 5, 2010; 1-4215-3442-8
27	Overture; Ōbāchua (序曲)	February 4, 2003; 4-08-873379-7	January 5, 2010; 1-4215-3443-6
28	Wyper the Berserker "Senki" Waipā (「戦鬼」ワイパー)	May 1, 2003; 4-08-873418-1	January 5, 2010; 1-4215-3444-4
29	Oratorio 聖譚曲	July 4, 2003; 4-08-873480-7	February 2, 2010; 1-4215-3445-2
30	Capriccio; Kapuritchio (狂想曲)	October 3, 2003; 4-08-873502-1	February 2, 2010; 1-4215-3446-0
31	We'll Be Here; Koko ni Iru (ここにいる)	December 19, 2003; 4-08-873551-X	February 2, 2010; 1-4215-3447-9
32	Love Song; Rabu Songu (島の歌声)	March 4, 2004; 4-08-873571-4	February 2, 2010; 1-4215-3448-7
33	Davy Back Fight; Davy Back Fight!!	June 4, 2004; 4-08-873593-5	February 2, 2010; 1-4215-3449-5
34	The City of Water, Water Seven "Mizu no Miyako" Wōtā Sebun (「水の都」ウォーターセブン)	August 4, 2004; 4-08-873638-9	March 2, 2010; 1-4215-3450-9
35	Captain; Kyaputen (船長)	November 4, 2004; 4-08-873667-2	March 2, 2010; 1-4215-3451-7
36	The Ninth Justice; Kyūbanme no Seigi (9番目の正義)	February 4, 2005; 4-08-873768-7	March 2, 2010; 1-4215-3452-5
37	Tom; Tomu-san (トムさん)	April 28, 2005; 4-08-873802-0	March 2, 2010; 1-4215-3453-3
38	Rocketman!! Rokettoman!! (ロケットマン!!)	July 4, 2005; 4-08-873839-X	March 2, 2010; 1-4215-3454-1
39	Scramble; Sōdatsusen (争奪戦)	November 4, 2005; 4-08-873872-1	April 6, 2010; 1-4215-3455-X
40	Gear; Gia (ギア)	December 26, 2005; 4-08-874003-3	April 6, 2010; 1-4215-3456-8

=== Volumes 41–60 ===
No.	Title	Original release date	English release date
41	Declaration of War; Sensen Fukoku (宣戦布告)	April 4, 2006; 4-08-874047-5	April 6, 2010; 1-4215-3457-6
42	Pirates vs. CP9; Kaizoku vs CP9 (海賊 VS CP9)	July 4, 2006; 4-08-874127-7	April 6, 2010; 1-4215-3458-4
43	Legend of a Hero; Eiyū Densetsu (英雄伝説)	September 4, 2006; 4-08-874149-8	April 6, 2010; 1-4215-3459-2
44	Let's Go Back; Kaerou (帰ろう)	December 4, 2006; 4-08-874287-7	May 4, 2010; 1-4215-3460-6
45	You Have My Sympathies; Shinchū Osasshisuru (心中お察しする)	March 2, 2007; 978-4-08-874314-1	May 4, 2010; 1-4215-3461-4
46	Adventure on Ghost Island; Gōsuto Airando no Bōken (ゴースト島の冒険)	July 4, 2007; 978-4-08-874382-0	May 4, 2010; 1-4215-3462-2
47	Cloudy, Partly Bony; Kumori Tokidoki Hone (くもり時々ホネ)	September 4, 2007; 978-4-08-874411-7	May 4, 2010; 1-4215-3463-0
48	Adventures of Oars; Ōzu no Bōken (オーズの冒険)	December 4, 2007; 978-4-08-874442-1	May 4, 2010; 1-4215-3464-9
49	Nightmare Luffy; Naitomea Rufi (ナイトメア・ルフィ)	March 4, 2008; 978-4-08-874485-8	June 1, 2010; 1-4215-3465-7
50	Arriving Again; Futatabi Tadoritsuku (再び辿りつく)	June 4, 2008; 978-4-08-874521-3	June 1, 2010; 1-4215-3466-5
51	The Eleven Supernovas; Jūichinin no Chōshinsei (11人の超新星)	September 4, 2008; 978-4-08-874563-3	June 1, 2010; 1-4215-3467-3
52	Roger and Rayleigh; Rojā to Reirī (ロジャーとレイリー)	December 4, 2008; 978-4-08-874602-9	June 1, 2010; 1-4215-3468-1
53	Natural Born King; Ō no Shishitsu (王の資質)	March 4, 2009; 978-4-08-874640-1	June 1, 2010; 1-4215-3469-X
54	Unstoppable; Mō Dare ni mo Tomerarenai (もう誰にも止められない)	June 4, 2009; 978-4-08-874662-3	July 6, 2010; 1-4215-3470-3
55	A Ray of Hope; Jigoku ni Okama (地獄に仏)	September 4, 2009; 978-4-08-874727-9	October 5, 2010; 1-4215-3471-1
56	Thank You; Arigatō (ありがとう)	December 4, 2009; 978-4-08-874761-3	February 1, 2011; 978-1-4215-3850-1
57	Paramount War; Chōjō Kessen (頂上決戦)	March 4, 2010; 978-4-08-870010-6	June 7, 2011; 1-4215-3851-2
58	The Name of This Era Is "Whitebeard"; Kono Jidai no Na o "Shirohige" to Yobu (この時代の名を"白ひげ"と呼ぶ)	June 4, 2010; 978-4-08-870045-8	September 13, 2011; 1-4215-3926-8
59	The Death of Portgas D. Ace; Pōtogasu Dī Ēsu Shisu (ポートガス・D・エース死す)	August 4, 2010; 978-4-08-870083-0	December 6, 2011; 978-1-4215-3959-1
60	My Little Brother; Otōto yo (弟よ)	November 4, 2010; 978-4-08-870125-7	January 3, 2012; 978-1-4215-4085-6

=== Volumes 61–80 ===
No.	Title	Original release date	English release date
61	Romance Dawn for the New World	February 4, 2011; 978-4-08-870175-2	March 6, 2012; 1-4215-4144-0
62	Adventure on Fish-Man Island; Gyojintō no Bōken (魚人島の冒険)	May 2, 2011; 978-4-08-870217-9	May 1, 2012; 978-1-4215-4196-9
63	Otohime and Tiger; Otohime to Taigā (オトヒメとタイガー)	August 4, 2011; 978-4-08-870270-4	July 3, 2012; 978-1-4215-4307-9
64	100,000 vs. 10; Jūman Bāsasu Jū (10万vs.10)	November 4, 2011; 978-4-08-870301-5	September 4, 2012; 978-1-4215-4329-1
65	To Nothing; Zero ni (ゼロに)	February 3, 2012; 978-4-08-870367-1	November 6, 2012; 978-1-4215-4979-8
66	The Road Toward the Sun; Taiyō e to Tsuzuku Michi (タイヨウへと続く道)	May 2, 2012; 978-4-08-870416-6	March 5, 2013; 978-1-4215-5237-8
67	Cool Fight	August 3, 2012; 978-4-08-870476-0	June 4, 2013; 978-1-4215-5371-9
68	Pirate Alliance; Kaizoku Dōmei (海賊同盟)	November 2, 2012; 978-4-08-870531-6	September 3, 2013; 978-1-4215-5881-3
69	S.A.D. SAD	March 4, 2013; 978-4-08-870614-6	December 3, 2013; 978-1-4215-6143-1
70	Enter Doflamingo; Dofuramingo Arawaru (ドフラミンゴ現る)	June 4, 2013; 978-4-08-870660-3	March 4, 2014; 978-1-4215-6460-9
71	Coliseum of Scoundrels; Kusemono-tachi no Koroshiamu (曲者達のコロシアム)	August 2, 2013; 978-4-08-870781-5	June 3, 2014; 978-1-4215-6945-1
72	Dressrosa's Forgotten; Doresurōza no Wasuremono (ドレスローザの忘れ物)	November 1, 2013; 978-4-08-870833-1	September 2, 2014; 978-1-4215-7344-1
73	Operation Dressrosa S.O.P. Doresurōza Esu Ō Pī Sakusen (ドレスローザSOP作戦)	March 4, 2014; 978-4-08-880022-6	January 6, 2015; 978-1-4215-7683-1
74	Ever at Your Side; Itsudemo Kimi no Soba ni Iru (いつでもキミのそばにいる)	June 4, 2014; 978-4-08-880069-1	April 7, 2015; 978-1-4215-7867-5
75	Repaying the Debt; Ore no Ongaeshi (おれの恩返し)	September 4, 2014; 978-4-08-880171-1	August 4, 2015; 978-1-4215-8029-6
76	Just Keep Going; Kamawazu Susume (構わず進め)	December 27, 2014; 978-4-08-880219-0	November 3, 2015; 978-1-4215-8260-3
77	Smile; Sumairu (スマイル)	April 3, 2015; 978-4-08-880326-5	February 2, 2016; 978-1-4215-8514-7
78	Champion of Evil; Aku no Karisuma (悪のカリスマ)	July 3, 2015; 978-4-08-880422-4	May 3, 2016; 978-1-4215-8584-0
79	Lucy!!	October 3, 2015; 978-4-08-880496-5	August 2, 2016; 978-1-4215-8815-5
80	Opening Speech; Kaimaku Sengen (開幕宣言)	December 28, 2015; 978-4-08-880578-8	November 1, 2016; 978-1-4215-9024-0

=== Volumes 81–100 ===
No.	Title	Original release date	English release date
81	Let's Go See the Cat Viper; Nekomamushi no Danna ni Ai ni Yukou (ネコマムシの旦那に会いに行こう)	April 4, 2016; 978-4-08-880648-8	February 7, 2017; 978-1-4215-9159-9
82	The World Is Restless; Zawatsuku Sekai (ざわつく世界)	July 4, 2016; 978-4-08-880726-3	May 2, 2017; 978-1-4215-9269-5
83	Emperor of the Sea, Charlotte Linlin; Kaizoku "Yonkō" Shārotto Rinrin (海賊「四皇」シャーロット・リンリン)	November 4, 2016; 978-4-08-880801-7	August 1, 2017; 978-1-4215-9433-0
84	Luffy vs. Sanji; Rufi Bāsasu Sanji (ルフィVSサンジ)	February 3, 2017; 978-4-08-881002-7	November 7, 2017; 978-1-4215-9700-3
85	Liar; Usotsuki (ウソつき)	May 2, 2017; 978-4-08-881070-6	February 6, 2018; 978-1-4215-9820-8
86	Emperor Assassination Plan; Yonkō Ansatsu Sakusen (四皇暗殺作戦)	August 4, 2017; 978-4-08-881198-7	May 1, 2018; 978-1-9747-0042-4
87	Bittersweet; Amaku nai (甘くない)	November 2, 2017; 978-4-08-881225-0	August 7, 2018; 978-1-9747-0141-4
88	Lion; Shishi (獅子)	March 2, 2018; 978-4-08-881362-2	November 6, 2018; 978-1-9747-0378-4
89	Bad End Musical; BADEND MUSICAL	June 4, 2018; 978-4-08-881496-4	February 5, 2019; 978-1-9747-0521-4
90	Sacred Marijoa; Seichi Marījoa (聖地マリージョア)	September 4, 2018; 978-4-08-881562-6	May 7, 2019; 978-1-9747-0700-3
91	Adventure in the Land of Samurai; Samurai no Kuni no Bōken (侍の国の冒険)	December 4, 2018; 978-4-08-881644-9	August 6, 2019; 978-1-9747-0701-0
92	Introducing Komurasaki the Oiran; Oiran Komurasaki Tōjō (花魁小紫登場)	March 4, 2019; 978-4-08-881758-3	November 5, 2019; 978-1-9747-1015-7
93	The Star of Ebisu; Ebisu-chō no Ninkimono (えびす町の人気者)	July 4, 2019; 978-4-08-881877-1	April 7, 2020; 978-1-9747-1255-7
94	A Soldier's Dream; Tsuwamono-domo ga Yume (兵どもが夢)	October 4, 2019; 978-4-08-882054-5	August 4, 2020; 978-1-9747-1537-4
95	Oden's Adventure; Oden no Bōken (おでんの冒険)	December 28, 2019; 978-4-08-882169-6	December 1, 2020; 978-1-9747-1813-9
96	I Am Oden, and I Was Born to Boil; Niete Nanbo no Oden ni Sōrō (煮えてなんぼのおでんに候)	April 3, 2020; 978-4-08-882252-5	April 6, 2021; 978-1-9747-1999-0
97	My Bible; Boku no Baiburu (僕の聖書)	September 16, 2020; 978-4-08-882347-8	August 17, 2021; 978-1-9747-2289-1
98	Vassals of Glory; Chūshin Nishiki (忠臣錦)	February 4, 2021; 978-4-08-882423-9	December 7, 2021; 978-1-9747-2519-9
99	Straw Hat Luffy; Mugiwara no Rufi (麦わらのルフィ)	June 4, 2021; 978-4-08-882691-2	May 3, 2022; 978-1-9747-2900-5
100	Color of the Supreme King; Haōshoku (覇王色)	September 3, 2021; 978-4-08-882780-3	August 2, 2022; 978-1-9747-3217-3

=== Volumes 101–current ===
No.	Title	Original release date	English release date
101	The Stars Take the Stage; Hanagata Tōjō (花形登場)	December 3, 2021; 978-4-08-883003-2	December 6, 2022; 978-1-9747-3420-7
102	The Pivotal Clash; Tennōzan (天王山)	April 4, 2022; 978-4-08-883120-6	April 4, 2023; 978-1-9747-3655-3
103	Warrior of Liberation; Kaihō no Senshi (解放の戦士)	August 4, 2022; 978-4-08-883190-9	July 4, 2023; 978-1-9747-3870-0
104	Shogun of Wano, Kozuki Momonosuke; Wano Kuni Shōgun – Kōzuki Momonosuke (ワノ国将軍 光月モモの助)	November 4, 2022; 978-4-08-883287-6	November 7, 2023; 978-1-9747-4129-8
105	Luffy's Dream; Rufi no Yume (ルフィの夢)	March 3, 2023; 978-4-08-883436-8	March 12, 2024; 978-1-9747-4327-8
106	A Genius's Dream; Tensai no Yume (天才の夢)	July 4, 2023; 978-4-08-883644-7	July 2, 2024; 978-1-9747-4586-9
107	The Hero of Legend; Densetsu no Eiyū (伝説の英雄)	November 2, 2023; 978-4-08-883785-7	November 12, 2024; 978-1-9747-4979-9
108	Better Off Dead In This World; Shinda Hō ga Ii Sekai (死んだ方がいい世界)	March 4, 2024; 978-4-08-884013-0	March 4, 2025; 978-1-9747-5222-5
109	On Your Side; Kimi no Mikata (きみの味方)	July 4, 2024; 978-4-08-884196-0	July 1, 2025; 978-1-9747-5590-5
110	The Upheaval of the Era; Jidai no Uneri (時代のうねり)	November 1, 2024; 978-4-08-884314-8	November 11, 2025; 978-1-9747-5896-8
111	Adventure in Elbaph; Erubafu no Bōken (エルバフの冒険)	March 4, 2025; 978-4-08-884491-6	March 10, 2026; 978-1-9747-6228-6
112	The Harley; Hārei (神典)	July 4, 2025; 978-4-08-884563-0	July 7, 2026; 978-1-9747-1652-4
113	The Birth of Loki; Roki Tanjō (ロキ誕生)	November 4, 2025; 978-4-08-884738-2	November 10, 2026; 978-1-9747-6670-3
114	The God Valley Incident; Goddo Barē Jiken (ゴッドバレー事件)	March 4, 2026; 978-4-08-885019-1	March 2, 2027; 978-1-9747-7159-2
115	The Strongest Thing in the World; Sekai de Ichiban Tsuyoi Mono (せかいで1ばんつよいもの)	July 3, 2026; 978-4-08-885130-3	—
116	— — (—)	December 4, 2026; 978-4-08-885234-8	—

== Digitally colored version ==
Volumes	Japanese release
1–12	June 15, 2012
13–23	September 28, 2012
24–63	December 4, 2012
64, 65	April 5, 2013
66–68	December 20, 2013
69, 70	August 25, 2014
71, 72	September 16, 2015
73–75	October 4, 2016
76	December 2, 2016
77	March 3, 2017
78	June 2, 2017
79	September 4, 2017
80	December 4, 2017
81, 82	March 2, 2018
83	October 4, 2018
84–86	August 2, 2019
87–92	September 16, 2020
93	March 4, 2021
94, 95	October 4, 2021
96–98	May 2, 2022
99	September 2, 2022
100–102	August 2, 2024
103, 104	December 4, 2024
105	April 4, 2025
106	April 3, 2026
107–	TBA

== See also ==
- List of One Piece media
