= One Piece: Baron Omatsuri and the Secret Island =

2005 film by Mamoru Hosoda

- DVD cover

Japanese name
- Kanji: ONE PIECE THE MOVIE オマツリ男爵と秘密の島
Transcriptions
- Revised Hepburn: Wan Pīsu Za Mūbī: Omatsuri Danshaku to Himitsu no Shima
- Directed by: Mamoru Hosoda
- Screenplay by: Masahiro Itō
- Based on: One Piece by Eiichiro Oda
- Starring: Mayumi Tanaka; Kazuya Nakai; Akemi Okamura; Kappei Yamaguchi; Hiroaki Hirata; Ikue Ohtani; Yuriko Yamaguchi; Akio Ōtsuka
- Cinematography: Tomokazu Shiratori
- Edited by: Masahiro Gotō
- Music by: Kōhei Tanaka
- Production company: Toei Animation
- Distributed by: Toei Company, Ltd.
- Release date: March 5, 2005
- Running time: 91 minutes
- Country: Japan
- Language: Japanese
- Box office: US$10.5 million

One Piece: Baron Omatsuri and the Secret Island (Japanese: ONE PIECE THE MOVIE オマツリ男爵と秘密の島, Hepburn: Wan Pīsu za Mūbī Omatsuri Danshaku to Himitsu no Shima) is a 2005 anime film directed by Mamoru Hosoda and produced by Toei Animation. It is the sixth animated feature film in the film series of the One Piece anime, based on the manga of the same name written and illustrated by Eiichiro Oda. It premiered in Japan on March 5, 2005, and was released to DVD on July 21, 2005.

One Piece: Baron Omatsuri and the Secret Island is considered one of the darkest of the One Piece films, due to its more serious tone and disturbing subject matter. Director Mamoru Hosoda would later found Studio Chizu and produce acclaimed films of this style.

== Plot ==
The Straw Hat Pirates receive an invitation to an island resort on the Grand Line run by Baron Omatsuri, and the crew travels to the island intent on relaxing and having fun. The Baron welcomes them to the resort and encourages them to enjoy themselves, but only after they complete The Trials Of Hell. The crew is hesitant, but Luffy accepts the challenge. The Straw Hats (represented by Usopp) win the first trial, but the outraged Baron demands they compete in another challenge. Luffy, Chopper, and Robin wait at the resort while the rest of the crew participates in the second trial.

Robin questions Muchigoro, one of Baron's crewmates, about a flower on the island. Muchigoro mentions something about the Lily Carnation being at the island's summit before running off. Luffy and Chopper wander off, both meeting other pirates who had previously arrived and participated in the trials. Luffy receives an ominous warning about Baron planning to split up his crew. Chopper learns about Baron's past, but right before he figures out the mystery, he is stricken with an arrow shot by Baron. The Straw Hats (represented by two pair of duos, Zoro/Sanji and Nami/Usopp) win the second trial, but rifts begin to grow between the crew members.

The crew notices Chopper is missing, but Baron interrupts them with a dinner party. The Baron notices Robin leaving, and she reveals to him that she was looking for the Lily Carnation. Baron reveals the flower's secret to Robin while Robin looks shocked. The Straw Hats realize that Chopper, Usopp, and Robin are gone. Arguments over who's to blame for their disappearances ensue before Baron announces the final trial. Tension between the crew results in the crew splitting up. The island was revealed to be a trap where Baron raises tensions between pirate crews before killing them by feeding the crew to the Lily Carnation, a flower of reincarnation, which gives life to Baron's crew. Luffy fights Baron after knowing the truth about the Lily Carnation, demanding Baron to return his crew. After a difficult and traumatizing battle, Luffy kills Baron with a single punch, saving his crew from the Lily Carnation.

Baron cries for his friends that were lost and how he is alone. He had been fooling himself for years with the false constructs of his crew created by the Lily Carnation. Each of his dead crewmates speak with him, telling him that they were happy to be remembered, but not with his corrupted charade. They apologize for leaving him alone for so long but believe it would be for the best if he forgets the night they died and finds new friends. Luffy lays exhausted on the ground while the crew all appear unharmed with no memory of the incident. The Straw Hats gather around Luffy, wondering how he can sleep in such a place, and Luffy laughs.

== Voice cast ==
| Character | Japanese |
|---|---|
| Monkey D. Luffy | Mayumi Tanaka |
| Roronoa Zoro | Kazuya Nakai |
| Nami | Akemi Okamura |
| Usopp | Kappei Yamaguchi |
| Sanji | Hiroaki Hirata |
| Tony Tony Chopper | Ikue Ohtani |
| Nico Robin | Yuriko Yamaguchi |
| Baron Omatsuri | Akio Ohtsuka |
| Muchigoro | Takeshi Kusao |
| Kerojii | Takeshi Aono |
| Keroshot | Masaharu Satou |
| Kerodeek | Jouji Yanami |
| Keroko | Keiko Yamamoto |
| Daisy | Anzu Nagai |
| DJ Gappa | Sosuke Ikematsu |
| Rosa | Makiko Ohmoto |
| Rick | Daisuke Sakaguchi |
| Lily Carnation | Misa Watanabe |
| Brief | Yoshito Yasuhara |
| Kotetsu | Shō Ayanokōji |
| Ochanomappa | Takeharu Kunimoto |

== Production ==
The animation in this film is very different from the television series, using the style often seen in Mamoru Hosoda's films. Some of the later episodes use styles similar to those seen in this film.

== Related media ==
Tatsuya Hamazaki adapted the film's story into a 228 pages light novel, released on March 14, 2005.

=== Box office ===
The film had a six-week run in the Top 10 of the Japanese box office. It made third place in its first week, fourth place in its second week, followed by two weeks at sixth place, fifth place in its fifth week, and seventh place in the sixth week.

== See also ==
- One Piece (1999 TV series)
- List of One Piece films
- List of One Piece media
