= One Piece: Heroines =

Japanese light novel series

- First light novel volume cover
- Created by: Eiichiro Oda
- Light novel
- Written by: Jun Esaka
- Illustrated by: Sayaka Suwa
- Published by: Shueisha
- English publisher: NA: Viz Media
- Imprint: Jump J-Books
- Original run: June 4, 2021 – present
- Volumes: 2
- Anime television film
- Directed by: Haruka Kamatani
- Written by: Momoka Toyoda
- Music by: Arisa Okhezama
- Studio: Toei Animation
- Licensed by: Crunchyroll (streaming)
- Original network: FNS (Fuji TV)
- Released: July 5, 2026

One Piece: Heroines is a Japanese light novel series written by Jun Esaka and illustrated by Sayaka Suwa. It began publication under Shueisha's Jump J-Books imprint in June 2021. The series is a female-centric spin-off of the One Piece manga series by Eiichiro Oda. An anime television special adaptation of the first chapter premiered on July 5, 2026.

== Synopsis ==
One Piece: Heroines is a collection of stand-alone short stories set in the One Piece universe that spotlight various female characters outside the main narrative. Nami participates in a fashion show that impacts her perspective on style, Robin assists Koala and Sabo in deciphering an ancient tablet, Princess Vivi becomes involved in an incident surrounding an unsolicited love letter, and Perona, Zoro, and Mihawk contend over a bottle of wine. Each vignette focuses on the respective heroine's minor adventure or interaction, drawing on character traits established in the original series.

== Media ==
=== Light novel ===
Written by Jun Esaka and illustrated by Sayaka Suwa, One Piece: Heroines began publication under Shueisha's Jump J-Books light novel imprint on June 4, 2021. Two volumes have been released as of March 4, 2024.

In May 2024, Viz Media announced that they had licensed the series and released the first volume on April 22, 2025.

No.	Original release date	Original ISBN	North American release date	North American ISBN
1	June 4, 2021	978-4-08-703510-0	April 22, 2025	978-1-9747-5283-6
1. "Nami: The Shoe Must Go On!"; 2. "Robin: The Archeologist's Unscrambled Eggs"; 3. "Vivi: The Blue Rose and the Writingale"; 4. "Perona: Nightmare of the Drifting Barrel"; 1. "Nami: Don't Let Me Go"
2	March 4, 2024	978-4-08-703510-0	July 22, 2025	978-1-9747-5541-7
1. "Hancock: Why Grandma Nyon Keeled Over"; 2. "Tashigi: There's Something Over There"; 3. "Reiju: A Terrible Cook"; 4. "Uta: Where the Wind Goes"; 1. "Nami & Robin: A Fleeting Moment"

=== Anime adaptation ===
An anime adaptation was announced during the "One Piece Day" event and livestream on August 10, 2025. It is directed by Haruka Kamatani, with Momoka Toyoda writing the screenplay and Takashi Kojima designing the characters. Cast members of the anime reprise their roles, while Maaya Sakamoto and Takehito Koyasu voice the characters Miucha (ミウチャ) and Lubun (ルブノ, Rubuno), respectively. The special premiered on July 5, 2026, on Fuji TV and its affiliates, airing during the main show's timeslot. The theme song is "Blue Shining Star" by Aina the End. Crunchyroll streamed the special. The English dub was released on October 13, 2026.
