= One Piece Film: Gold =

2016 film

- Theatrical release poster
- Directed by: Hiroaki Miyamoto
- Screenplay by: Tsutomu Kuroiwa
- Based on: One Piece by Eiichiro Oda
- Produced by: Kei Kajimoto; Yūta Kano
- Starring: Mayumi Tanaka; Kazuya Nakai; Akemi Okamura; Kappei Yamaguchi; Hiroaki Hirata; Ikue Ōtani; Yuriko Yamaguchi; Chō; Kazuhiro Yamaji; Hikari Mitsushima; Gaku Hamada; Nanao; Kendo Kobayashi; Kin'ya Kitaōji
- Cinematography: Naoyuki Wada
- Edited by: Masahiro Gotō
- Music by: Yuki Hayashi
- Production company: Toei Animation
- Distributed by: Toei Company, Ltd.
- Release dates: July 15, 2016 (Emirates Palace); July 23, 2016 (Japan)
- Running time: 120 minutes
- Country: Japan
- Language: Japanese
- Box office: $70.8 million (Note: One Piece: Film Gold: Japan – ¥5.18 billion ($51.6 million); China – CN¥107 million ($16,103,544); South Korea – ₩1,710,761,100 ($1,495,486); North America, France, Italy, Spain, New Zealand, Thailand – $1,319,785; Australia – $91,294; Taipei – $210,000)

One Piece Film: Gold (Japanese: ワンピース フィルム ゴールド, Hepburn: Wan Pīsu Firumu Gōrudo) is a 2016 Japanese animated fantasy action adventure film directed by Hiroaki Miyamoto and produced by Toei Animation. It is the thirteenth feature film in the One Piece film series, based on the manga series of the same name by Eiichiro Oda. It had its world premiere at the Emirates Palace hotel in Abu Dhabi on July 15, 2016, and later premiered in Japan on July 23, 2016. On October 5, 2016, Funimation announced that they acquired the rights to screen the film in the United States and Canada on January 10–17, 2017.

== Plot ==
Following the events of One Piece: Heart of Gold, the Straw Hat Pirates arrive at Gran Tesoro, a ship which is an entertainment city and independent nation ruled by Gild Tesoro. The concierge Baccarat gives the Straw Hats a VIP stay due to their fame, and lends them large sums of money with which to begin gambling. They participate in games where they win a lot of money. Baccarat then takes them to the VIP lounge to meet Tesoro, who challenges them to a dice game.

However, Baccarat uses her Devil Fruit abilities to strip Monkey D. Luffy of his luck, causing him to lose. She reveals her foul play and demands the Straw Hats repay the money they lost. Since the money was loaned from Gran Tesoro, the Straw Hats cannot afford to repay it, causing them to fight Baccarat, Tesoro, and his subordinates Mr. Tanaka and Dice. They are overwhelmed, and Tesoro, who can manipulate gold, captures Roronoa Zoro; it turns out that the gold dust which fell on the crew like snow when entering Gran Tesoro is used to place everyone under the power of Gild Tesoro so that they must do his bidding. Tesoro gives the Straw Hats until midnight the next day to repay their debt or he will execute Zoro. Outside, the Straw Hats run into Carina, a former acquaintance of Nami who is now working for Tesoro.

They hatch a plan with Carina to steal Tesoro's fortune from a hotel vault, and find out that most people in the city are enslaved to Tesoro. The next day, the Straw Hats split up into two teams and infiltrate the hotel. Luffy and Franky scale it from the outside in order to disable its surveillance network, but are caught by security. Tesoro binds Luffy's arms in gold, and Mr. Tanaka sends them plummeting into the Golden Prison, a large cavern filled with nothing but gold.

Luffy and Franky make their way through a pipe system to get to a pump room with seawater that can wash the gold off Luffy. Meanwhile, the rest of the Straw Hats and Carina sneak into the supposed treasure room, only to find themselves on a stage as part of a trap laid by Tesoro. Tesoro reveals that he knows where Luffy and Franky are and attempts to drown them by flooding their location with seawater. He then attempts to execute Zoro, but when trying to release liquid gold from Gran Tesoro's fountains, seawater comes out instead.

The Straw Hats reveals that they had intended for all of this to happen in order for the seawater to be released and free everyone from Tesoro's control. Gran Tesoro's citizens and prisoners rise up against Tesoro and his crew. Marine forces then attack Gran Tesoro.

The Straw Hats defeat Baccarat, Tanaka and Dice, and Luffy uses Gear Four to defeat Tesoro, sending him flying into the Marine fleet where he is arrested. Gran Tesoro then appears to go into a self-destruct sequence. Carina volunteers to stay behind and steer the ship away while everyone else evacuates. After the Straw Hats depart, they realize the protocol was merely a fireworks countdown, and Carina has stolen the entire ship. As the Straw Hats are chased by the Marine fleet, Carina sails Gran Tesoro into the distance.

== Voice cast ==
Character	Japanese Voice Actor	English Voice Actor
Monkey D. Luffy	Mayumi Tanaka	Colleen Clinkenbeard
Roronoa Zoro	Kazuya Nakai	Christopher R. Sabat
Nami	Akemi Okamura	Luci Christian
Usopp	Kappei Yamaguchi	Sonny Strait
Sanji	Hiroaki Hirata	Eric Vale
Tony Tony Chopper	Ikue Ōtani	Brina Palencia
Nico Robin	Yuriko Yamaguchi	Stephanie Young
Franky	Kazuki Yao	Patrick Seitz
Brook	Chō	Ian Sinclair
Gild Tesoro	Kazuhiro Yamaji	Keith Silverstein
Gild Tesoro	Takahiro Sakurai (young)	Dallas Reid (young)
Baccarat	Nanao	Amber Lee Connors
Dice	Kendo Kobayashi	Tyson Rinehart
Tanaka	Gaku Hamada	Daman Mills
Carina	Hikari Mitsushima	Michele Knotz
Raise Max	Kin'ya Kitaōji	Garrett Schenck
Sakazuki	Fumihiko Tachiki	Andrew Love
Rob Lucci	Tomokazu Seki	Jason Liebrecht
Spandam	Masaya Onosaka	Christopher Corey Smith
Sabo	Tōru Furuya	Vic Mignogna
Koala	Satsuki Yukino	Jeannie Tirado
Kent Beef Jr.	Arata Furuta	Brian Olvera
Pork	Arata Furuta	Josh Grelle
Jimmy Myers	Korokke	Alejandro Saab
Long Long	Wataru Takagi	Chad Cline
Morkin	Nadal	Joel McDonald
Narcie	Nobuyuki Hiyama	Scott Frerichs
Lepre	Rena Takeda	Kristi Kang
Bit	Ayaka Miyoshi	Kristen Lee
Kiruko	Arisa Sato	Jennifer Green
Alba	Nanase Nishino	Katy Tye
Curve	Ryō Narita	David Trosko
Rikka	Chika Sakamoto	Jill Harris
Tempo	Naoko Watanabe	Bryn Apprill
Double Down	Naoto Takenaka	TBC
Whitejack	Naoto Takenaka	Keith Kubal
Camael	Masakazu Mimura	Keith Kubal
Stella	Gi Ryoko	Madeleine Morris

== Production ==
=== Music and soundtrack ===
External videos
- "Ikari o Kure yo" Music video for the film's theme song by Glim Spanky.

The film score was composed by Yuki Hayashi and the film's theme song is "Ikari o Kure yo" (怒りをくれよ) by Glim Spanky. As a fan of the band, Eiichiro Oda personally requested that they provide the theme. The film's staff asked the group to write something different than what would typically be associated with One Piece and to evoke the feeling of "battling Luffy." The first song they brought was not what the staff had in mind and they were suggested to write something more "unrefined" and "Iggy Pop-ish", to which Glim Spanky responded with "Ikari o Kure yo".

ONE PIECE FILM GOLD Original Soundtrack (Disc 1)
#	Title			Length
#	English	Romaji	Japanese	Length
01	GOLD & JIVE～SILVER OCEAN	Gold & Jive-Silver Ocean	GOLD & JIVE～SILVER OCEAN	11:11
02	Embarkation	Jyousenn	乗船	0:12
03	Baccarat Appears	Bakaratouzyou	バカラ登場	1:13
04	Welcome to Gran Tesoro!	Youkoso Grantesoro he!	ようこそグラン・テゾーロへ!	2:20
05	Funky White Suit	Funky Shiro Suit	ファンキー白スーツ	1:18
06	Slave of Gold	Kinn No Dorei	金の奴隷	0:32
07	Gold Emperor	Ougontei	黄金帝	2:26
08	Go Go Casino	Go Go Casino	GOGO カジノ	0:52
09	HOT CHELL	HOT CHELL	HOT CHELL	4:46
10	Win	Kachimakuri	勝ちまくり	0:32
11	VIP Room	Vip Room	VIPルーム	1:05
12	Exciting Chouhan	Exciting Chouhan	エキサイティング丁半	1:09
13	Tesoro and Crew	Tesoro To Ichimi	テゾーロと一味	3:58
14	I Was Tricked!?	Hamerareta!?	ハメられた!?	1:31
15	Ultimate Gambling	Kyukyoku No Gambling	究極のギャンブル	2:01
16	Thief and Vixen	Dorobouneko To Megitsune	泥棒猫と女狐	0:50
17	WILD COW	WILD COW	WILD COW	0:37
18	Tesoro Money	Tesoro Money	テゾーロマネー	2:14
19	Slave's Hopelessness	Dorei No Heisokukan	奴隷の閉塞感	1:49
20	Crossing Prediction	Kousasuru Omowaku	交錯する思惑	2:32
21	Tactical Preparation	Sakusenkaigichuu	作戦準備中	0:37
22	The Pair's Past	Furtarinokako	二人の過去	2:35
23	Strategic Meeting	Sakusenkaigi	作戦会議	2:17
Disc length				48:37

ONE PIECE FILM GOLD Original Soundtrack (Disc 2)
#	Title			Length
#	English	Romaji	Japanese	Length
01	Dokidoki Spy Item	DokiDoki Spy Time	ドキドキスパイアイテム	3:14
02	Natural Trap	Tennen Trap	天然トラップ	1:52
03	Gum Gum Infiltration	Gomugomu No Sennyu	ゴムゴムの潜入	1:12
04	An Intruder is Found!!!	Shinnyusya Hakken!!!	侵入者発見!!!	0:37
05	Tesoro's Power	Tsoro No Chikara	テゾーロの力	2:06
06	The Upcoming Crisis	Semaru Kiki	迫る危機	0:42
07	Celestial Dragons	Tenryubito	天竜人	0:39
08	Gold Prison	Gold Prison	ゴールドプリズン	0:43
09	Prisoner Blues	Syuujin No Blues	囚人のブルース	0:42
10	Legendary Gambler	Densetsu No Gambler	伝説のギャンブラー	0:55
11	Faint Possibility	Kasukana Kanousei	かすかな可能性	1:30
12	The Secret Plan of Reversal	Gyakuten No Hisaku	逆転の秘策	0:21
13	Fake Celestial Dragons	Nise Tenryubito	ニセ天竜人	1:04
14	The Way to Escape	Dassyutu Heno Michi	脱出への道	1:12
15	Max's Determination	Max No Ketsui	マックスの決意	1:13
16	In Pursuit of Freedom	Jiyuu Wo Motomete	自由を求めて	1:22
17	Betrayal	Uragiri	裏切り	1:40
18	A Desperate Situation	Zettaizetsumei	絶体絶命	3:34
19	An Emergency Situation	Masaka No Jitai	まさかの事態	1:13
20	Extreme Entertainment!	Kyukyoku No Entertainment	究極のエンターテインメント	2:21
21	Tesoro's Past	Tesoro No Kako	テゾーロの過去	1:12
22	Tesoro's Madness	Tesoro No Kyouki	テゾーロの狂気	1:24
23	God's Power	Kami No Chikara	神の力	1:29
24	The Three Executives Appear	Sankanbu Touzyou	3幹部登場	1:45
25	The Strength to Stand Up	Tachiagaru Chikara	立ち上がる力	1:18
26	Oppressed Crew	Osareru Ichimi	押される一味	1:13
27	The Terror of Luck	Lucky No Osoroshisa	ラッキーの恐ろしさ	2:17
28	The Subsequent Battle	Tuduku Battle	続くバトル	1:41
29	The Strongest Brother Appears	Saikyou No Anitouzyou	最強の兄登場	1:35
30	Believe In Your Nakamas	Nakama Wo Shinjite	仲間を信じて	2:31
31	The Great Turnabout	Daigyakuten	大逆転	3:35
32	Mad God	Kuruttakami	狂った神	1:24
33	Last Battle	Last Battle	ラストバトル	1:21
34	Triumphant Liberty	Jiyuu No Shouri	自由の勝利	0:53
35	The Final Trick	Saigo No Shikake	最後の仕掛け	1:43
36	Give Me Rage (Short ver.)	Ikari Wo Kureyo (Short Version)	怒りをくれよ(Short ver.)	1:38
Disc length				55:11

== Release ==
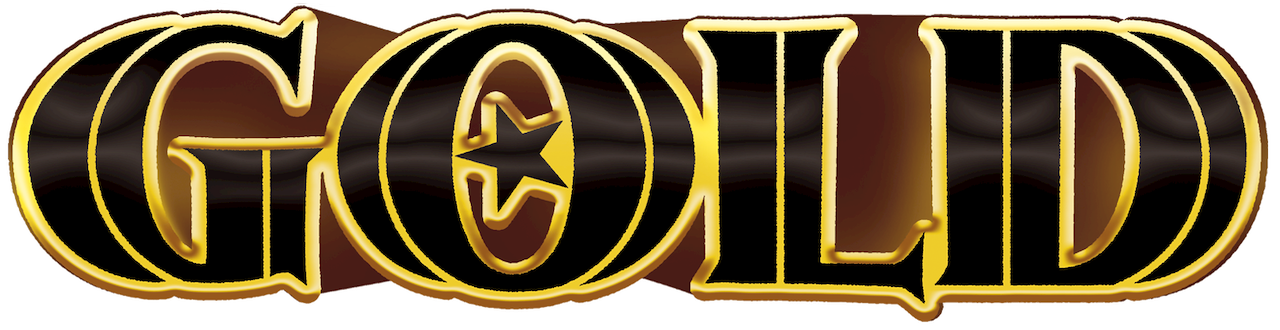
Logo of One Piece Film: Gold

The film was released in Japan on July 23, 2016, by its distributor Toei Company, on 739 screens in 344 theatres across the country.

The Blu-ray was released on December 28, 2016, in Japan and was released on 7 April 2017 in Germany, and 2 May 2017 in the U.S.

Selecta Visión released the film in Spain and Portugal on DVD and Blu-ray on 12 April 2017, featuring Japanese, Spanish and Catalan audio, as well as subtitles in Spanish, Catalan and Portuguese. Previously, the film had been premiered in theaters in Spain on 4 November 2016, dubbed in Spanish and Catalan. It was the first One Piece film to be released in cinemas in Spain.

== Reception ==
=== Box office ===
The film grossed $10.9 million on its opening weekend in Japan. It earned ¥1,516,450,600 from the 1,088,166 ticket sales in its first four days. It grossed $35.6 million by August 16, 2016. It grossed over ¥5 billion ($48.8 million) in Japan by early September 2016. By the end of 2016, it had grossed ¥5.18 billion in Japan, and was one of the year's top five highest-grossing domestic films.

In China, it grossed the biggest three-day total (CN¥105.5 million) in China of any Japanese film for 2016, up until the release of Your Name. Film: Gold went on to gross CN¥107 million ($16,103,544) in China. The film also grossed ₩1,710,761,100 ($1,495,486) in South Korea, and $423,593 in the United States and Canada. The worldwide total box office is about $70.84 million.

=== Critical reception ===
On review aggregator website Rotten Tomatoes, the film holds an approval rating of 67%, based on 9 reviews, and an average rating of 6.2/10. On Metacritic, the film has a weighted average score of 43 out of 100, based on 4 critics, indicating "mixed or average reviews".

=== Home media ===
The film was released in Japan in standard and limited edition DVD and Blu-ray formats on December 28, 2016. The limited edition "Golden Limited Edition" contains with interview of Eiichiro Oda, making of and application card for event, TV spot, trailer, and much more. Comes with golden earphones, a pen, Gran Tesoro Adventure original board game, golden casino-chip menko cards, and an unreleased press material. By the end of the year in Japan, the movie Gold had sold approximately 79,932 copies of DVDs and Blu-rays.

Koch Media released the film in Italy on DVD and Blu-ray on April 6, 2017. Selecta Visión released the film in Spain on DVD and Blu-ray on 12 April 2017, featuring Japanese, Spanish and Catalan audio, also with subtitles in Spanish and Catalan. On April 17, 2017, Kazé Anime launched Germany two versions of the home video, the Standard Edition Blu-ray/DVD and the Limited Deluxe Edition. In North America, Funimation released the film on DVD and Blu-ray on May 2, 2017.

== See also ==
- List of One Piece films
- List of One Piece media
