= One Piece Film: Z =

2012 film by Tatsuya Nagamine

One Piece: Z
- Theatrical release poster
- Directed by: Tatsuya Nagamine
- Screenplay by: Osamu Suzuki
- Based on: One Piece by Eiichiro Oda
- Produced by: Yoshihiko Taneda; Masato Jōno
- Starring: Mayumi Tanaka; Kazuya Nakai; Akemi Okamura; Kappei Yamaguchi; Hiroaki Hirata; Ikue Ohtani; Yuriko Yamaguchi; Kazuki Yao; Chō; Hōchū Ōtsuka; Ryoko Shinohara; Teruyuki Kagawa
- Cinematography: Takeo Ogiwara
- Edited by: Nobuhiro Maki
- Music by: Kohei Tanaka; Shirō Hamaguchi
- Production company: Toei Animation
- Distributed by: Toei Company, Ltd.
- Release date: December 15, 2012
- Running time: 107 minutes
- Country: Japan
- Language: Japanese
- Box office: $85 million (Note: One Piece: Film Z: Japan – ¥6.87 billion (US$82.3 million) (2012); Hong Kong & Taiwan – $1,382,211; Philippines, Singapore, Thailand – $681,794; South Korea – ₩626,891,000 ($572,580))

One Piece Film: Z (Japanese: ワンピース フィルム ゼット, Hepburn: Wan Pīsu Firumu Zetto) is a 2012 Japanese anime fantasy action adventure film directed by Tatsuya Nagamine. It is the twelfth feature film in the One Piece film series, based on the manga series of the same name by Eiichiro Oda. The film stars the regular television cast of Mayumi Tanaka, Kazuya Nakai, Akemi Okamura, Kappei Yamaguchi, Hiroaki Hirata, Ikue Otani, Yuriko Yamaguchi, Kazuki Yao, and Chō. It also features Hōchū Ōtsuka as Zephyr, an ex-naval Admiral, with Ryoko Shinohara and Teruyuki Kagawa as Zephyr's henchmen Ain and Benz respectively. The events of the film takes place near the end of the fifteenth season of the One Piece anime series during the "Z's Ambition" story arc, which serves as a prologue. The film revolves around the Straw Hat Pirates battling against Zephyr, considered to be the most powerful enemy they have faced yet.

== Plot ==
"Black Arm" Zephyr (黒腕のゼファー, Kokuwan no Zefā), leader of the "Neo Marines", commences an assault on the navy on Firs Island, a volcanic island. While there, Zephyr steals the Dyna Stones. To defeat Kizaru and the marines, Zephyr starts an eruption by crushing a Dyna Stone, only to be sent flying into the ocean.

The Straw Hat Pirates eventually discover an unconscious Zephyr floating on the sea. Monkey D. Luffy reels him in, but when grabbing Zephyr's prosthetic arm (a weapon made with sea prism stone known as the battle smasher), Luffy loses all his strength. Tony Tony Chopper attends to Zephyr's wounds. Zephyr comes too and, after learning that he is the presence of pirates, fights Luffy, Roronoa Zoro and Sanji.

Having discovered Zephyr's location with a Vivre Card, his henchmen Ain (アイン) and Binz (ビンズ, Binzu) join him in the fight. Ain uses her powers to de-age Nami, Chopper, Brook and Nico Robin, while Binz uses his powers to trap Franky, Usopp and Brook with vines. Luffy is defeated by Zephyr and the Battle Smasher. Realizing that Luffy is the grandson of Monkey D. Garp, Zephyr attempts to kill them, so the Straw Hats are forced to flee. At Marine Headquarters, the navy discovers Zephyr's whereabouts and decides to recover the Dyna Stones. Landing on Dock Island, Franky repairs the Thousand Sunny, which has been damaged by Zephyr.

All pirates who come to that island say that they have been attacked by Zephyr. Local Mobston (モブストン, Mobusuton), angered by Zephyr destroying the pirates' dreams, decides to give the Straw Hats his strongest equipment. While there, they gather information on Zephyr's location from the navy and meet up with Kuzan, who has left the navy after being defeated by Akainu on Punk Hazard. Using the Sea Train, the Straw Hats enter Secon Island just as the volcano erupts. They confront Zephyr's group and are defeated once again.

According to Garp, Zephyr used to be an Admiral in the navy. When Zephyr's wife and son were killed by a pirate who resented him, Zephyr became an instructor. One day, most of Zephyr's recruits were killed and he lost his arm after being attacked by a pirate with Devil Fruit powers. Zephyr then acquired the Battle Smasher, a weapon developed by the navy's scientist to defeat Devil Fruit users, and organized a strike unit. However, when the pirate who attacked him was chosen to serve as a Warlord, Zephyr left the Navy, organizing the Neo Marines as a result. On Dock Island, Kuzan reveals that Zephyr is targeting the three volcanic islands known as End Points. If all three islands erupt in a short period of time of each other, it would result in a giant eruption that would cover the New World's oceans, killing everyone in them. The Straw Hats confront the Neo Marines on the third End Point.

The Straw Hats are victorious against the Neo Marines and converted Pacifista's. With Ain defeated, Nami, Chopper, Robin and Brook return to their original age. In the battle between Luffy and Zephyr, the Battle Smasher breaks, and the two simultaneously knock the other one down. Zephyr admits defeat, believing that Luffy will now kill him. However, Luffy spares Zephyr, not wanting to kill anyone.

Realizing that not all pirates are the same and that his actions were driven by anger, Zephyr apologizes to Ain and Binz. Kizaru and the navy then appear and choose to execute Zephyr, the Neo Marines, and the Straw Hats. Zephyr states that he has done everything he wanted to do and now he will pay the price for his actions. Then, a wall of ice appears and separates him from the others, thus giving the Straw Hats, Ain and Binz the chance to escape.

As the Straw Hats sail away, Zephyr battles against the marines until he succumbs to his injuries and dies. Later, (Note: In a mid-credit scene.) the Straw Hats return to Dock Island, giving their gear and weapons back to Mobston, before going their separate ways.

== Voice cast ==
| Character | Japanese voice actor | English voice actor |
|---|---|---|
| Monkey D. Luffy | Mayumi Tanaka | Colleen Clinkenbeard |
| Roronoa Zoro | Kazuya Nakai | Christopher R. Sabat |
| Nami | Akemi Okamura | Luci Christian |
| Usopp | Kappei Yamaguchi | Sonny Strait |
| Sanji | Hiroaki Hirata | Eric Vale |
| Tony Tony Chopper | Ikue Ohtani | Brina Palencia |
| Nico Robin | Yuriko Yamaguchi | Stephanie Young |
| Franky | Kazuki Yao | Patrick Seitz |
| Brook | Cho | Ian Sinclair |
| Z | Hōchū Ōtsuka; Masami Suzuki (young) | Jeremy Schwartz; Tia Ballard (young) |
| Ain | Ryoko Shinohara | Lauren Landa |
| Binz | Teruyuki Kagawa | Matthew Mercer |
| Borsalino | Unshō Ishizuka | Ray Hurd |
| Sakazuki | Fumihiko Tachiki | Andrew Love |
| Aokiji | Takehito Koyasu | Jason Douglas |
| Monkey D. Garp | Hiroshi Naka | Brian Mathis |
| Sengoku | Takkou Ishimori | Ed Blaylock |
| Mobstone | Masashi Hirose | Mark Fickert |
| Koby | Mika Doi | Micah Solusod |
| Helmeppo | Kōichi Nagano | Mike McFarland |
| Tsuru | Minori Matsushima | Juli Erickson |
| Kirin | Shun Takagi | Darryl Roberds |
| Gali | Kumiko Watanabe | Bryn Apprill |
| Purin | Yui Kano | Angela Chase |

== Development and production ==
In November 2011, Fuji Television announced that production on One Piece Film: Z has begun. One month later, Viz Media's Shonen Jump and Hisashi Suzuki, deputy director of Shueisha's Shonen manga group announced through their Twitter accounts that Eiichiro Oda would be the executive producer for the film. On January 30, 2012, Toei issued a press release announcing the film's plot and also announced the film's director Tatsuya Nagamine and the film's release in December.

The April 23, 2012 issue of Weekly Shonen Jump revealed character designs for Zephyr and also revealed minor information, including staff information as well as the premiere date, December 15. The screenplay was written by Osamu Suzuki, who serves as one of the writers of the television program SMAP x SMAP, and the film's character designer and animation supervisor is Masayuki Sato, who was previously involved as an animation supervisor and character designer of One Piece Film: Strong World.

== Promotion ==
On April 21, 2012, Toei's official website for the One Piece films was updated with a teaser trailer.

A special pre-sale collaboration ticket with the Dragon Ball Z: Battle of Gods movie was made to commemorate the release of the two films. The dual-ticket good for both films has a special new illustration by both Akira Toriyama (author of Dragon Ball) and Eiichirō Oda. Limited to 8,989 across Japan, the tickets went on sale on November 23, 2012, for ¥2,600 ($31.51 US) apiece.

== Music ==
The film's theme songs are covers of Nickelback's "How You Remind Me" and Joan Jett's "Bad Reputation", both performed by Canadian singer Avril Lavigne. Oda sent a personal thank you letter to Lavigne after hearing her cover of "How You Remind Me". "Bad Reputation" is one of Oda's favorite songs. Lavigne agreed to contribute the songs for the film. The film's soundtrack, containing 30 tracks, was released on December 12, 2012, by Sony Music Entertainment Japan.

== Release ==
=== Box office ===
One Piece Film: Z opened at number one in the Japanese box office, earning ¥1.37 billion (US$16.3 million) during its opening weekend. Film attendees received 1 of 2 million copies of an 84-page "Volume 1,000" of One Piece, which contains designs about Character Z (also known as Zephyr) and an exclusive One Piece Treasure World card. The film grossed ¥6.87 billion in Japan

The movie was released across several other Asian countries including Taiwan, Hong Kong, Singapore, Philippines, Thailand, and South Korea. A French dub was released for One Piece's "Straw Hat Day" on May 15, 2013. The worldwide total box office from Japan and above countries is about $85 million.

=== Critical response ===
Toshi Nakamura, writing for Kotaku, called Z "something [he] was totally not expecting." Nakamura particularly praised the film's villain, calling its backstory "dramatic, and more importantly, convincing," as well as the pacing of the storyline, saying that it feels "organic." However, Nakamura had mixed opinions of the film's secondary characters, stating that "some of the characters have their own plot lines that connect nicely with the [film's] original story," but said they eventually end up as "foils to build on the character of Z." Although Nakamura disapproved of the film's unresolved plotlines, he would declare that the film is "definitely well worth seeing for any fan of the series."

=== Home media ===
Z was released in Japan on June 28, 2013, on DVD and Blu-ray, with both formats having a regular edition and a limited "Greatest Armored Edition". The regular editions for both formats include trailers, with the first copies having one of nine randomly distributed holographic stickers of a straw hat. The limited editions for both formats include all nine straw hat holographic stickers, Zephyr's weapon Smasher as a keychain, a stand with a voice recording, and not-for-sale press material. The limited editions also has a bonus DVD which includes the prologue to the film, titled One Piece: Glorious Island, "event footage", and interviews. By the end of the year in Japan, it had sold 125,667 DVDs and 80,016 Blu-rays.

In the Philippines, Z was released on DVD and VCD by C-Interactive Digital Entertainment on October 17, 2013.

On April 7, 2014, Funimation announced its acquisition of the home video rights to the film in the United States and Canada. The film was released in a Blu-ray/DVD combo on September 30, 2014, which includes the English dub recorded by Funimation, promos for the film, and a video of Patrick Seitz at Sakura-Con in 2014.

Selecta Visión released the film in Spain on DVD and Blu-ray on November 30, 2016, featuring Japanese and Spanish audio, as well as subtitles in Spanish.

== See also ==
- List of One Piece films
- List of One Piece media
