= Tatsuya Nagamine =

Japanese anime director (1971–2025)

- 長峯 達也
- Born: October 6, 1971
- Died: August 20, 2025 (aged 53)
- Occupation: Anime director
- Employer: Toei Animation
- Known for: One Piece Film Z, Dragon Ball Super: Broly, HeartCatch PreCure!, Happiness Charge PreCure!

Tatsuya Nagamine (長峯 達也, Nagamine Tatsuya; October 6, 1971 – August 20, 2025) was a Japanese anime director who worked for Toei Animation.

== Death ==
He died on 20 August, 2025, after a year-long battle with an undisclosed illness. His death was not publicly disclosed until November 13, when a memorial service was held at Toei's studio in Higashi-Ōizumi, Nerima, Tokyo, and was announced on X by several of his colleagues. Nagamine's family followed by posting an announcement on his account.

== Works ==
=== Television shows ===
Year(s)	Title	Credited as	Notes	Ref(s)
Year(s)	Title	director	Notes	Ref(s)
2004	Interlude	Yes	OVA	
2004–2005	Beet the Vandel Buster	Yes	TV series	
2005–2006	Beet the Vandel Buster: Excellion	Yes	TV series	
2006–2007	Powerpuff Girls Z	No	TV series; Transformation animation with Yoshikazu Tomita	
2010–2011	HeartCatch PreCure!	Yes	TV series	
2013–2014	Saint Seiya Omega	Yes	TV series (#52–77)	
2014–2015	HappinessCharge PreCure!	Yes	TV series	
2016	One Piece: Heart of Gold	Yes	TV special	
2017–2018	Dragon Ball Super	Yes	TV series; co-directed with Ryota Nakamura (#77–131)	
2019–2024	One Piece	Yes	TV series (#892–1122)	

=== Films ===
Year	Title	Credited as	Ref(s)
Year	Title	director	Ref(s)
2006	Digimon Savers: Ultimate Power! Activate Burst Mode!!	Yes	
2007	Dr. Slump: Dr. Mashirito and Abale-chan	Yes	
2007	Yes! Precure 5: Great Miraculous Adventure in the Mirror Kingdom!	Yes	
2008	Yes Pretty Cure 5 GoGo! The Movie: Happy Birthday in the Land of Sweets	Yes	
2012	One Piece Film Z	Yes	
2018	Dragon Ball Super: Broly	Yes	
