= Tokyo One Piece Tower =

Former indoor theme park in Japan

- Tokyo One Piece Tower Indoor theme park
- Interactive map of Tokyo One Piece Tower
- Location: 4-2-8, Shiba Park, Minato, Tokyo
- Coordinates: 35°39′31″N 139°44′44″E
- Status: Defunct
- Opened: March 13, 2015
- Closed: July 31, 2020
- Operated by: Amusequest Tokyo Tower LLP
- Theme: One Piece
- Website: https://onepiecetower.tokyo

Tokyo One Piece Tower was an indoor theme park for the popular Japanese manga series, One Piece. It opened on March 13, 2015 inside Tokyo Tower. After its opening, it underwent a partial renovation and reopened on June 18, 2016. It offered several games and attractions based on characters of the Straw Hat Crew from One Piece, entertainment shows, merchandise shops and themed restaurants, and seasonal events and campaigns.

The park closed permanently on July 31, 2020, due to the impact of the COVID-19 pandemic on its management.

== Concept and history ==
The park was themed as Tongari Island (トンガリ島) in the New World; after the Straw Hat Crew landed there, they created games and attractions for their fans with the islanders. The island's leader is Tongari Den Den Mushi who frequently appeared as the guide in some attractions and the website. Tongari (トンガリ) means "pointed" or "sharp" in Japanese and it refers to the shape of Tokyo Tower.

In 2016, it ranked 7th in TripAdvisor 2016 Traveler's Choice Top 10 Amusement Parks in the Japan region.

== Attractions ==
Tokyo One Piece Tower attractions and shops
Floor	Attractions	Shops	Notes
1F		Mugiwara Store, Sanji's Oresama Restaurant, Cafe Mugiwara	Free admission
3F	Welcome Wall, 360° Log Theatre ~The World of One Piece~, The Plaza of Origin, Straw Hat Crew's Great Feast, Luffy's Endless Adventure	Tongari Store	Ticket booths
4F	Zoro's Soul of Edge, Nami's Casino House, Usopp's Road to Sogeking, Chopper's Thousand Sunny Tours, Robin's Finding Ponegliff, Franky's Park, Brook's Horror House, Children's Playground	Franky's Cola Bar	Restrooms
5F	Manga Walk, One Piece Live Attraction, Tongari Theater	—N/a	Restrooms

=== 360 Log Theatre -The World of One Piece ===
An attraction where scenes of the Straw Hat Crew's adventures from the manga series were projected onto a 360-degree omnidirectional screen. It was located on the third floor, the entrance floor of One Piece Tower, and was the first attraction to welcome visitors to the island.

=== Luffy's Endless Adventure ===
A walkthrough attraction that followed the history of the protagonist, Monkey D. Luffy and his fellow characters. It was located on the 5th floor. There were life-size statues of characters, miniatures, and exhibition panels.

There was a movie theater with a wide screen at the end showing an original short film only available at Tokyo One Piece Tower.

=== Zoro's Soul of Edge ===
An interactive game based on one of Straw Hat Crew, Roronoa Zoro located on the fourth floor. Inside was a Dojo that Zoro established and the players must slash down cannons fired from the screen in front to defeat Marines with a sword using Zoro's skills.

Also, Zoro's and other characters' swords and weapons were displayed on the wall inside this attraction.

=== Nami's Casino House ===
An interactive attraction based on the navigator of Straw Hat Crew, Nami located on the fourth floor. It was a casino game where the players bet a certain amount of Berries, the world currency in One Piece, for a three-point match to win a jackpot. The winners with over a certain amount of Berries received a VIP card.

=== Usopp's Road to Sogeking ===
An interactive game based on one of Straw Hat Crew, Usopp located on the fourth floor. Players shoot the Marines with a slingshot, Usopp's iconic weapon for a given time. The last enemy was the World Government.

=== Chopper's Thousand Sunny Tours ===
An interactive walkthrough attraction guided by one of Straw Hat Crew, Tony Tony Chopper located on the fourth floor. The whole attraction imitated the interior of Straw Hat Crew's second ship, Thousand Sunny. It included the kitchen and dining, Nami and Robin's bedroom, and other facilities inside Thousand Sunny.

=== Robin's Finding Poneglyph ===
An interactive game based on one of Straw Hat Crew, Nico Robin located on the fourth floor involving the whole park. The players were given one Transponder Snail to find many ancient characters hidden all over the park to finally discover Poneglyph in the ancient remains.

=== Franky's Park ===
An area dedicated to the shipwright, Franky on the fourth floor. There was a pinball machine called "Franky's Ball Run" in the shape of Franky, a colorful children's area with toys, and a small cafe called Franky's Cola Bar offering light meals and beverages.

=== Brook's Horror House ===
A haunted house based on one of Straw Hat Crew, Brook. The players were given one salt ball (塩玉) to defeat zombies roaming inside the haunted house.

=== Tongari Island Photo Spots ===
There were numerous photo spots inside the park including characters' life-size statues, portraits, special exhibitions, etc.

== One Piece Live Attraction live show ==
One Piece Live Attraction original entertainment show where live One Piece characters unfolded an adventurous story on stage. The theater was located on the 5th floor. Approximately four to six shows were held every day. The storyline changes seasonally.

Title	Performance period
One Piece Live Attraction 1: Welcome to Tongari Mystery Tour	March 13, 2015 – April 10, 2016
One Piece Live Attraction 2	April 23, 2016 – April 9, 2017
One Piece Live Attraction 3: Phantom	April 29, 2017 – April 7, 2019
One Piece Live Attraction 4: Marionette	April 24, 2019 – 2020

== Shops and restaurants ==
=== Tongari Store ===
A merchandise shop inside the park on the third floor offering exclusive goods and items with original designs only at Tokyo One Piece Tower.

=== One Piece Mugiwara store ===
A One Piece official merchandise shop outside the park on the first floor of Tokyo Tower offering One Piece goods and items. There were exclusive items only on sale at Tokyo Tower.

=== Franky's Cola Bar ===
A small cafe inside the park managed by cola lover Franky. It offered various light meals and beverages, and some tables and chairs to rest.

=== Cafe Mugiwara ===
A library cafe located on the first floor of Tokyo Tower that offered foods and beverages inspired by different characters and stories from One Piece. It had more than six hundred books and comics from the world related to ONE PIECE, including original manga series, for visitors to read freely while they eat and rest.

It offered special monthly birthday menus for a certain character from One Piece. Also, it often collaborates with other events such as Ichiban Kuji

It is open from 10 a.m. to 10 p.m.

=== Sanji's Oresama Restaurant ===
A restaurant run by Straw Hat Crew's cook, Sanji located on the ground floor of Tokyo Tower beside Cafe Mugiwara. It offered various meals in buffet style from 11 a.m. to 3 p.m. (maximum 70 minutes stay) and a la carte style from 3 p.m. to 10 p.m. including a course menu and special events related menus.

"ORESAMA (俺様)" is a narcissistic way of saying "me" in Japanese and the first personal pronoun Sanji refers to himself in the One Piece series. His statue stood between Mugiwara Cafe and Sanji's ORESAMA Restaurant.

The interiors imitated various items or scenes from ONE PIECE such as a mast, prison bars, etc. for visitors to indulge in the world of ONE PIECE.
