= Eiichiro Oda =

Japanese manga artist (born 1975)

Eiichiro Oda 尾田 栄一郎
- Born: January 1, 1975 (age 51); Kumamoto, Kumamoto Prefecture, Japan
- Occupation: Manga artist
- Spouse: Chiaki Inaba (m. 2004)
- Children: 2
- Writing career
- Years active: 1992–present
- Notable work: One Piece
- Notable awards: Grand Prize at 41st Japan Cartoonists Association Award

Eiichiro Oda (Japanese: 尾田 栄一郎, Hepburn: Oda Eiichirō; born January 1, 1975) is a Japanese manga artist and the creator of the series One Piece, the best-selling manga in history and the best-selling comic series printed in volume. With more than 600 million tankōbon copies of One Piece in circulation worldwide, Oda is one of the best-selling fiction authors. The series' popularity resulted in Oda being named one of the artists who changed the history of manga.

== Early life ==
Eiichiro Oda was born on January 1, 1975, in Kumamoto, Japan. At the age of four he resolved to become a manga artist in order to avoid having to get a "real job". His biggest influence was Akira Toriyama and his series Dragon Ball. He recalls that his interest in pirates was probably sparked by the popular TV animation series titled Vicky the Viking.

== Career ==
At the age of 17, Oda submitted his work Wanted! and won several awards, including second place in the coveted Tezuka Award. That got him into a job at the Weekly Shōnen Jump magazine, where he originally worked as assistant manga artist/assistant to Shinobu Kaitani's series Suizan Police Gang before moving to Masaya Tokuhiro on Jungle King Tar-chan and Mizu no Tomodachi Kappaman, which gave him an unexpected influence on his artistic style. At the age of 19, he began working as an assistant to Nobuhiro Watsuki on Rurouni Kenshin, before winning the Hop Step Award for new manga artists. Watsuki credits Oda for helping create the character Honjō Kamatari who appears in Rurouni Kenshin.

During this time, Oda drew two pirate-themed one-shot stories called "Romance Dawn", which were published in Akamaru Jump and Weekly Shōnen Jump respectively in late 1996. "Romance Dawn" featured Monkey D. Luffy as the protagonist, who then became the protagonist of One Piece.

In 1997, One Piece began serialization in Weekly Shōnen Jump and has become not only one of the most popular manga in Japan, but the best-selling manga series of all time. It sold 100 million collected tankōbon volumes by February 2005, over 200 million by February 2011, had 320,866,000 copies printed worldwide by December 2014, 430 million volumes in circulation worldwide as of October 2017, 440 million copies sold as of May 2018, 450 million in print as of March 2019, and 600 million in print as of March 2026.

Additionally, individual volumes of One Piece have broken publishing records in Japan. Volume 56 received the highest initial print run of any manga, 2.85 million copies, in 2009. Volume 57's print of 3 million in 2010 was the highest first print for any book in Japan, not just manga. A record that was broken several times by subsequent volumes and currently held by 67's 4.05 million initial printing in 2012. In 2013, the series won the 41st Japan Cartoonists Association Award Grand Prize, alongside Kimuchi Yokoyama's Nekodarake Nice.

In a 2008 poll, conducted by marketing research firm Oricon, Oda was elected fifth most favorite manga artists of Japan. He shared the place with Yoshihiro Togashi, creator of YuYu Hakusho and Hunter × Hunter. In their 2010 poll on the Mangaka that Changed the History of Manga, Oda came in fourth.

For the tenth One Piece animated theatrical film, Strong World, Oda created the film's story, drew over 120 drawings for guidance and insisted Mr. Children provide the theme song. Additionally, a special chapter of the manga was created and included in tankōbon volume 0, which was given free to attendees of the film and also contained his drawings for the film. Following the particular success of this film, Oda also provided the character design for and executive produced the subsequent movies Z (2012), Gold (2016), Stampede (2019), and Red (2022).

Oda and Akira Toriyama created a 2007 crossover one-shot called Cross Epoch, that contains characters from Toriyama's Dragon Ball and Oda's One Piece. In 2013, they each designed a Gaist character for the video game Gaist Crusher. In 2011, Oda and Mitsutoshi Shimabukuro created the One Piece and Toriko crossover one-shot Taste of the Devil Fruit. Shimabukuro stated that he came up with the bulk of the story while Oda gave suggestions.

== Personal life ==
Since November 7, 2004, Eiichiro Oda has been married to Chiaki Inaba, a former model, actress and tarento. Oda met her in December 2003 during a Jump Festa 2004 where Chiaki Inaba played the role of Nami during the stage show "One Piece Spectacle Stage". Oda and Inaba have two daughters, one born in 2005 and the other in 2009.

Oda regarded many mangaka both as his friends and rivals. Among these were his fellow assistants under Nobuhiro Watsuki; Hiroyuki Takei, and Mikio Itō. Still many years later, they remained good friends. For the title page illustration of One Piece chapter 766, which ran in 2014's 50th issue of Weekly Shōnen Jump alongside the final two chapters of Masashi Kishimoto's series Naruto, Oda included a hidden message and other tributes in the art. Kishimoto himself also gave tribute in the ending of Naruto where the character Boruto Uzumaki makes a drawing of the Straw Hat Jolly Roger on a mountain. Upon the release of Chapter 1,000 of One Piece, several of Oda's fellow mangaka rivals paid tribute in the author's comment section of Weekly Shōnen Jump by congratulating Oda for achieving this milestone.

According to Oda himself and his manga editors, he is an ardent worker and perfectionist, sleeping only three hours per day during a typical work week.

He was hospitalized for a peritonsillar abscess in 2013 and later discharged from the hospital after two weeks. After a year, he underwent a tonsillectomy to completely cure his condition.

Oda gifted Kumamoto Prefecture ¥800 million (US$8M/£4.9M) in 2018 after it suffered a damaging earthquake in 2016 that had affected its iconic Kumamoto Castle. Oda's ¥800M donation was offered in two separate gifts, one for ¥500M under Luffy's name (Luffy's current bounty at the time in Berries, the currency of One Piece) and a second donation of ¥300M. Eiichiro Oda has long been a supporter of earthquake-stricken areas, writing supportive messages, contributing art for local products, and participating in the ONE PIECE Kumamoto Revival Project.

== Awards ==
Eiichiro Oda has received several awards and titles. His Awards lists:

- Second half of 1992: second place Tezuka Award for Wanted!
- 1993: Hop☆Step Award for Ikki Yakō
- 2000: Tezuka Osamu Cultural Prize finalist for One Piece
- 2001: Tezuka Osamu Cultural Prize finalist for One Piece
- 2002: Tezuka Osamu Cultural Prize finalist for One Piece
- 2005: Sondermann Award in the International Manga category for One Piece
- 2006: Japanese Media Arts Festival 100 Manga Selection for One Piece
- 2008: Sondermann Award in the International Manga category for Volume 44 of One Piece
- 2009: Sondermann Award in the International Manga category for Volume 48 of One Piece
- 2012: Received Grand Prize at 41st Japan Cartoonists Association Award for One Piece
- 2015: Guinness World Record for "the most copies published for the same comic book series by a single author" with 320,866,000 copies printed worldwide up until December 2014.
- 2018: Kumamoto Prefecture Honorary Prize
- 2019: Most Searched Author at The Yahoo! Japan Search Awards
- 2019: Included in the list of Newsweek Japan's "100 Globally respected Japanese people".
- 2022: Special Lifetime Achievement Award at Napoli Comicon 2022 in Italy.
- 2022: Guinness World Record for "the most copies published for the same comic book series by a single author" with 516,566,000 copies in printed worldwide up until July 2022.
- 2023: 18th Shin Watanabe Award, an award for a producer or creator who has created a major movement in the entertainment business and made a significant contribution to the development of popular entertainment culture.

== Works ==
=== Manga ===
- Wanted! (one-shot, 1992)
- God's Present for the Future (神から未来のプレゼント, Kami Kara Mirai no Purezento; one-shot, 1993)
- Ikki Yakō (一鬼夜行; one-shot, 1993)
- Monsters (one-shot, 1994)
- Romance Dawn (first version; one-shot, 1996)
- Romance Dawn (second version; one-shot, 1996)
- One Piece (1997–present)
  - Cross Epoch (one-shot, 2007) – crossover between One Piece and Dragon Ball with Akira Toriyama
  - Taste of the Devil Fruit (実食! 悪魔の実!!, Jisshoku! Akuma no Mi!!; one-shot, 2011) – crossover between One Piece and Toriko with Mitsutoshi Shimabukuro
- Wanted! Eiichiro Oda Short Stories (WANTED! 尾田栄一郎短編集, Oda Eiichirō Tanpenshū; collection of previous one-shots, 1998)

==== Art books ====
- One Piece Color Walk 1
- One Piece Color Walk 2
- One Piece Color Walk 3 Lion
- One Piece Color Walk 4 Eagle
- One Piece Color Walk 5 Shark
- One Piece Color Walk 6 Gorilla
- One Piece Color Walk 7 Tyrannosaurus
- One Piece Color Walk 8 Wolf
- One Piece Color Walk 9 Tiger
- One Piece Color Walk 10 Dragon

==== Films ====
- One Piece Film: Strong World (2009) – costume design, creature design, story and executive producer
- One Piece Film: Z (2012) – character design, costume design and executive producer
- One Piece Film: Gold (2016) – character design (Straw Hat costume design, Carina, Tesoro, Dice and Baccarat character design) and executive producer
- One Piece: Stampede (2019) – character design, costume design, creative supervisor and executive producer
- One Piece Film: Red (2022) – executive producer, character design, and script reviewer

=== Other ===
- Drew an illustration for Chibi Maruko-chan manga creator Momoko Sakura after her death. The illustration showed Luffy sharing barbecue with Maruko-chan with accompanying message that the two authors got along well in both their professional and personal lives and that he is praying for Sakura.
- Collaborated with fashion brand, Gucci and created a Lookbook featured both Monkey D. Luffy and Roronoa Zoro sporting poses with a series of images of the two rocking the latest Gucci line.
- Drew Original Illustration for the President and all One Piece fans in France.
- Drew Original Illustration for sport "Karate" for the Olympic Games Tokyo 2020 Official Programme book which highlights the defining traits, history, rules, top athletes, venue, schedule, and the major tournament records for each of the 33 featured sports.
- One of the executive producers for the 2023 One Piece live-action series by Netflix and Tomorrow Studios.
- Designed a new character and monsters for the 2023 role-playing video game One Piece Odyssey.
