= Four Emperors (One Piece) =

Strongest pirate crews in One Piece

One Piece's Four Emperors of the Sea. From right to left: Monkey D. Luffy, Blackbeard, Shanks, and Buggy.

The Four Emperors (四皇, Yonkō) of the Sea are four fictional powerful pirates considered great powers in Eiichiro Oda's One Piece series. In the second half of the Grand Line known as the New World, the Four Emperors rule over separate empires consisting of several islands. An alliance between two or more of the Four Emperors is feared by the World Government, which maintains hegemony over most of the world. The geopolitical struggle between the World Government and the Four Emperors is the main conflict through the story.

Initially the Four Emperors consists of Shanks, Whitebeard, Kaido, and Big Mom, forming a precarious balance of power with the Seven Warlords of the Sea and the Marines that keeps the world at peace; they are allowed to do as they please without interference from or to the World Government. Blackbeard's capture of Ace leads to a war between the Whitebeard Pirates and the World Government, which results in Whitebeard's death.^{[ch. 432, 483, 576, 581]} Two years later, Blackbeard is considered to have assumed Whitebeard's position.^{[ch. 650]} Following the events of the Onigashima war, where Big Mom and Kaido were defeated, Monkey D. Luffy and Buggy were considered the new members to replace them.

== Evolution of the Emperors ==
Monkey D. Garp explains about the Four Emperors for the first time in the manga, behind him appearing the silhouettes of the initial members: Shanks, Whitebeard, Big Mom and Kaido.

There have been seven different Emperors of the Sea during the story of One Piece. Big Mom was the first to form a pirate empire, followed by Whitebeard and Kaido.^{[ch. 853]}^{[ch. 963]}^{[ch. 1049]} Shanks was the most recent Emperor of the Sea at the start of the story, and is now the longest-ruling Emperor at the present part of the story.^{[ch. 957]}^{[ch. 1053]}

Four Emperors
Initial Emperor of the Sea		Current
Emperor	Transition	Current
"Red-Haired" Shanks	Became an Emperor of the Sea after the Roger Pirates were disbanded, six years after giving his straw hat to Luffy, and six years before the current story. Active pirate.^{[ch. 957]}	"Red-Haired" Shanks
"Whitebeard" Edward Newgate	Became an Emperor of the Sea after the Rocks Pirates were disbanded. Defeated during the Paramount War by the Marines and the Blackbeard Pirates. Deceased.^{[ch. 576]} The Blackbeard Pirates defeated the remnants of the Whitebeard Pirates in the Grudge War a year later, and Blackbeard became a new Emperor of the Sea.^{[ch. 820]}	"Blackbeard" Marshall D. Teach
Kaido, "King of the Beasts"	Became an Emperor of the Sea after the Rocks Pirates were disbanded. Defeated during the Raid on Onigashima by Monkey D. Luffy. Presumably deceased.^{[ch. 1064]} Monkey D. Luffy replaced Kaido as the Emperor allied with the Wano Country and became a new Emperor of the Sea.^{[ch. 1053]}	"Straw Hat" Monkey D. Luffy
"Big Mom" Charlotte Linlin	Became an Emperor of the Sea after the Rocks Pirates were disbanded. Defeated during the Raid on Onigashima by Trafalgar Law and Eustass Kid. Presumably deceased.^{[ch. 1064]} Around the same time, Buggy the Clown, Dracule Mihawk, and Sir Crocodile allied to form the Cross Guild.^{[ch. 1058]} After news of both Big Mom's defeat and the formation of the Cross Guild spread, Buggy was declared an Emperor of the Sea.^{[ch. 1053]}	Buggy, "the Genius Jester"

== Whitebeard Pirates ==
Whitebeard Pirates
Edward Newgate Leader (Quake-Quake)
Marco "The Phoenix"		Portgas D. "Fire Fist" Ace		"Diamond" Jozu		Thatch	
Div.1	(Bird-Bird: Phoenix)	Div.2	(Flame-Flame)	Div.3	(Twinkle-Twinkle)	Div.4	Chef
Vista "The Flower Swords"		Blamenco		Rakuyo		Namur	
Div.5	Swordsman	Div.6	(Pocket-Pocket)	Div.7	—N/a	Div.8	—N/a
Blenheim		Curiel		Kingdew		Haruta	
Div.9	—N/a	Div.10	—N/a	Div.11	—N/a	Div.12	—N/a
"Water Buffalo" Atmos		Speed Jiru		Fossa		Izo	
Div.13	—N/a	Div.14	—N/a	Div.15	—N/a	Div.16	—N/a

The Whitebeard Pirates (白ひげ海賊団, Shirohige Kaizokudan) are a crew led by Whitebeard and sixteen division commanders, each in charge of one hundred men.

Following Whitebeard's death at the hands of the Blackbeard Pirates, some of its remnants went into hiding after failing to avenge his death.

=== Edward Newgate ===
Edward Newgate (エドワード・ニューゲート, Edowādo Nyūgēto), better known as Whitebeard (白ひげ, Shirohige), is the 21 ft. captain of the Whitebeard Pirates and one of the Four Emperors who comes from the island of Sphinx.^{[ch. 432, 474]} He is an unnaturally large and burly old man who fights with a naginata as his weapon and uses the ability of the Paramecia-type Tremor-Tremor Fruit (グラグラの実, Gura Gura no Mi) to create shock waves powerful enough to cause earthquakes and tsunamis.^{[ch. 434, 552]} Whitebeard was capable of utilizing all three types of Haki and was capable of using the advanced application for both and Haoshoku and Busoshoku Haki.^{[ch. 567, 570]} Whitebeard is regarded as the world's strongest man and the only one to have matched the King of the Pirates Gold Roger in combat when Whitebeard was a member of the Rocks Pirates.^{[ch. 957f.]}

After his crew member Portgas D. Ace is sentenced to death, Whitebeard declares war on the Marines and attacks their stronghold with his fleet. Eventually after being badly wounded in the war and revealing that he saw the One Piece while not claiming it, Whitebeard is killed by the Blackbeard Pirates just before he proclaims that the One Piece is real. After Whitebeard's death, Blackbeard uses an unknown method to steal his Devil Fruit power.^{[ch. 576]} At the time of his death, Whitebeard held a bounty of 5,046,000,000, the second-highest bounty ever for a pirate after Roger.

When asked, Whitebeard reveals his ultimate ambition is to have a family. Later in life, when he forms his own pirate crew, he calls all the crewmembers his "sons" and they address him as "Father" or "pops".^{[ch. 552, 553]}

In the original Japanese series, he was originally voiced by Kinryu Arimoto, until his death on February 1, 2019, and was replaced by Ryūzaburō Ōtomo. In the Funimation English adaptation, his voice is supplied by R Bruce Elliott.

The character is named after the real life pirate Edward Teach.

=== Division Commanders ===
==== Portgas D. Ace ====
Portgas D. Ace (ポートガス・D・エース, Pōtogasu Dī Ēsu), also called "Fire Fist" Ace (火拳のエース, Hiken no Ēsu), is the 2nd division commander of the Whitebeard Pirates, captain of the Spade Pirates, and Luffy's older sworn brother.^{[ch. 157, 159]} He is the son of Gol D. Roger and Portgas D. Rouge.^{[ch. 525, 550]} Having eaten the Logia-type Flare-Flare Fruit/Flame-Flame Fruit (メラメラの実, Mera Mera no Mi), Ace is capable of manipulating, creating, and transforming into fire.^{[ch. 159]} Ace was capable of using utilizing all three types of Haki.^{[ch. 587]} Eventually, after being saved from execution, he shields Luffy from Akainu's magma attack at the cost of his own life.^{[ch. 574]} He is buried on an unnamed island in the New World alongside his captain Whitebeard.^{[ch. 590]}

He is voiced by Toshio Furukawa, while he is voiced by Daisuke Sakaguchi as a child. In the 4Kids English adaptation, his names are changed to Portgaz D. Trace and "Heat Fist" Trace, and he is voiced by Jesse Hooker. In the Funimation English adaptation, his name is spelled Portgas D. Ace, and his voice is supplied by Travis Willingham. In the live-action series, Ace is portrayed by Xolo Maridueña.

==== Marco ====
Marco "The Phoenix" (不死鳥のマルコ, Fushichō no Maruko) is Whitebeard's 1st division commander who can transform into a phoenix or a phoenix-human hybrid using the Bird-Bird Fruit: Model Phoenix. He is a skilled user of Haki.^{[ch. 434, 554]} Like the rest of the crew, he participated in the war at Marineford to rescue Ace. After the crew disbanded, he settled in Sphinx, his captain's home island, working as a doctor for the citizens.^{[ch. 909]} Later, he accompanied Cat Viper to Wano Country to help the Straw Hats defeat the Animal Kingdom Pirates.

Marco is voiced by Masakazu Morita in the original Japanese version. In the Funimation dub, he is voiced by Bill Jenkins in Episode 151 and by Kyle Phillips starting in Episode 316.

==== Izo ====
Izo (イゾウ, Izō) was the 16th division commander, who was one of Kozuki Oden's retainers in Wano as well as Kikunojo's older brother. He was later killed in the battle of Onigashima fighting Guernic and Maha of CP0. Izo is voiced by Yūsei Oda in the original Japanese version while Masamu Ono voiced him in his youth. In the Funimation dub, he is voiced by Colton Jones in earlier episodes and by Jessie James Grelle starting in Episode 963 while Kelsey Maher voiced him in his youth.

==== Other Commanders ====
- Kozuki Oden was the 2nd division commander during his time sailing with the Whitebeard Pirates.
- "Diamond" Jozu (ダイヤモンド・ジョズ, Daiyamondo Jozu): The 3rd division commander who can turn parts of his body into diamond via the Twinkle-Twinkle Fruit.^{[ch. 553]} Jozu is voiced by Takashi Nagasako in the original Japanese version and by Matt Thurston in the Funimation dub.
- Thatch (サッチ, Satchi): The late 4th division commander. He was killed by Blackbeard during his secession from the Whitebeard Pirates. Thatch is voiced by Mitsuaki Madono in the original Japanese version and by Parker Fitzgerald in the Funimation dub.
- Vista "The Flower Swords" (花剣のビスタ, Kaken no Bisuta): The 5th division commander. Vista is voiced by Masaya Takatsuka in the original Japanese version and by Hunter Barnett in the Funimation dub.
- Blamenco (ブラメンコ, Buramenko): A short rotund man with gray skin who is the 6th division commander. He ate the Pocket-Pocket Fruit, which enables him to create pockets in his body. Blamenco is voiced by Keiji Hirai in the original Japanese version and by Jessie James Grelle in the Funimation dub.
- Rakuyo (ラクヨウ, Rakuyō): The 7th division commander. Rakuyo is voiced by Takahiro Fujimoto in the original Japanese version and by James Chandler in the Funimation dub.
- Namur (ナミュール, Namyūru): A shark-type fish-man who is the 8th division commander. Namur is voiced by Daisuke Matsubara in the original Japanese version.
- Blenheim (ブレンハイム, Burenhaimu): The 9th division commander. Blenheim is voiced by Nobuyuki Hiyama in the original Japanese version and by Mark Rios in the Funimation dub.
- Curiel (クリエル, Kurieru): The 10th division commander who wields two bazookas that he carries on his back. Curiel is voiced by Kōhei Fukuhara in the original Japanese version and by Ricco Fajardo in the Funimation dub.
- Kingdew (キングデュー, Kingudyū): The 11th division commander. Kingdew is voiced by Hiromi Miyazuki in the original Japanese version and by Patric Carroll in the Funimation dub.
- Haruta (ハルタ, Haruta): The 12th division commander. Haruta is voiced by Junko Noda in the original Japanese version and by Clifford Chapin in the Funimation dub.
- Atmos (アトモス, Atomosu): The 13th division commander who sports a horned helmet. Atmos is voiced by Kōhei Fukuhara in the earlier parts of the original Japanese anime and by Kenji Hamada starting in Episode 485 of the English dub. In the Funimation dub, he is voiced by Paul Giovanni Ramirez.
- Speed Jiru (スピード・ジル, Supīdo Jiru): The 14th division commander. Speed Jiru is voiced by Yūsuke Numata in the original Japanese version and by Jeff Johnson in the Funimation dub.
- Fossa (フォッサ, Fossa): The 15th division commander. Fossa is voiced by Kōichi Nagano in the original Japanese version and by Kent Williams in the Funimation dub.

=== Other Whitebeard Pirates members ===
- Tate (テート, Tēto): A nurse who, along with the other nurses of the crew's medical division, was in charge of Whitebeard's health care.^{[ch. 234]} She is voiced by Yuka Shioyama in the original Japanese version of the anime.
- Marshall D. Teach was part of the crew until he leaves and starts his own crew after murdering Thatch.^{[ch. 440]}
- Dogstorm and Cat Viper were apprentices of the crew while accompanying Kozuki Oden.
- Kozuki Hiyori traveled with the crew while accompanying Oden.

=== Subordinate Captains ===
There are subordinate captains with their own pirate crews who are loyal to Whitebeard:

- Epoida (エポイダ, Epoida): A subordinate captain and former member of the Whitebeard Pirates. Epoida is voiced by Hiromi Miyazuki in the original Japanese version and by Larry Brantley in the Funimation dub.
- Whitey Bay (ホワイティベイ, Howaitibei): A subordinate captain and former member of the Whitebeard Pirates. Whitey Bay is voiced by Yuka Shioyama in the original Japanese version and by Jennifer Green in the Funimation dub.
- Andre (アンドレ, Andore): A subordinate captain and former member of the Whitebeard Pirates. Andre is the twin brother of Marines officer Candre. Andre is voiced by Yasunori Matsutani in the original Japanese version and by Tyler Walker in the Funimation dub.
- Kinga (キンガ, Kinga): A subordinate captain and former member of the Whitebeard Pirates.
- Islewan (アイルワン, Airuwan): A subordinate captain and former member of the Whitebeard Pirates who has a walrus-like face. Islewan is voiced by Takehiro Fujiwara in the original Japanese version and by Neil Rogers in the Funimation dub.
- Doma (ドーマ, Dōma): A subordinate captain who is accompanied by an unnamed monkey. Doma is voiced by Kōji Haramaki in the Japanese version and by Nick Landis in the Funimation dub.
- McGuy (マクガイ, Makugai): A subordinate captain. McGuy is voiced by Yasunori Matsutani in the original Japanese version and by Ian Ferguson in the Funimation dub.
- The Decalvan Brothers (ディカルバン兄弟, Dikaruban Kyōdai): Twin brother subordinate captains and the captains of their own pirate crew. They both wield clawed gloves. The Decalvin Brothers are voiced by Eiji Takemoto and Masaya Takatsuka in the original Japanese version respectively and by Jeff Plunk and Wyn Delano in the Funimation dub respectively.
- Little Oars Jr. (リトルオーズJr., Ritoru Ōzu Junia): A 196 ft. ancient giant who is a subordinate captain and the captain of the Little Pirates who model their outfits after him. He is a descendant of Oars. Little Oars Jr. is voiced by Kenji Hirai in the original Japanese version and by Jeremy Schwartz in the Funimation dub.
- Squard (スクアード, Sukuādo): A subordinate captain and the captain of the Maelstrom Spider Pirates who has a personal hatred towards Gold Roger, who killed some of his pirate crew. Squard is voiced by Seiji Sasaki in the original Japanese version and by Jason Kane in the Funimation dub.
- Elmy (エルミー, Erumi): A subordinate captain. Elmy is voiced by Kimiko Saitō in the original Japanese version and by Dawn M. Bennett in the Funimation dub.
- Ramba (ランバ, Ranba): A subordinate captain. Ramba is voiced by Kōhei Fukuhara in the original Japanese version and by Phil Parsons in the Funimation dub.
- A O (A・O, Ā Ō): A subordinate captain and the captain of the A O Pirates. A O is voiced by Kōhei Fukuhara in the original Japanese version and by Mark Fickert in the Funimation dub.
- Delacuaji (デラクアヒ, Derakuahi): A subordinate captain. Delacuaji is voiced by Takahiro Fujimoto in the original Japanese version and by Michael Speck in the Funimation dub.
- Zodia (ゾディア, Zodia): A subordinate captain. Zodia is voiced by Patrick McAllister in the Funimation dub.
- Palms (パームス, Pāmusu): A subordinate captain wearing a giant panda-headed indument. Palms is voiced by Kōhei Fukuhara in the original Japanese version and by Justin Briner in the Funimation dub.
- Bizarre (ビザール, Bizāru): A subordinate captain who sports a golden jaw-like structure over his mouth. Bizarre is voiced by Shunzō Miyasaka in the original Japanese version and by Wilbur Penn in the Funimation dub.
- Karma (カルマ, Karuma): An octopus-type fish-man who is the captain of the Takotopus Pirates. Karma is voiced by Hiroshi Okamoto in the original Japanese version and by Ben Bryant in the Funimation dub.
- Blondie (ブロンディ, Burondi): A subordinate captain who is accompanied by a small lion who rides in his hat. Blondie is voiced by Kenji Akibane in the original Japanese version and by Jarod Warren in the Funimation dub.
- Pavlik (パブリク, Paburiku): A subordinate captain. Pavlik is voiced by Alejandro Saab in the Funimation dub.
- Hangan (ハンガン, Hangan): A long-necked subordinate captain. Hangan is voiced by Aaron Roberts in the Funimation dub.
- Arthur (アーサー, Āsā): A subordinate captain who has sharp claws.
- Amadob (アマドブ, Amadobu): A subordinate captain. Amadob is voiced by Keiji Hirai in the original Japanese version and by Ryan O'Mara in the Funimation dub.
- Choi (チョイ, Choi): A subordinate captain.
- Baggaley (バガリー, Bagarī): A subordinate captain.
- Wallem (ウォレム, Waremu): A subordinate captain. Wallem is voiced by Phil Alford in the Funimation dub.
- Brew (ブリュー, Buryū): A subordinate captain. Brew is voiced by Takehiro Fujimoto in the original Japanese version.
- Brocca (ブロッカ, Burokka): A subordinate captain. Brocca is voiced by Chris Rager in the Funimation dub.
- Nosgarl (ノスガール, Nosugāru): A subordinate captain.
- Rush (ラッシュ, Rasshu): A subordinate captain.
- Zucca (ズッカ, Zukka): A subordinate captain.
- Agsilly (アグシリー, Agushirī): A subordinate captain.
- Julius (ユリウス, Yuriusu): A subordinate captain.
- Great Michael (グレートミカエル, Gurēto Mikaeru): A subordinate captain.
- Vitan (ヴィタン, Vitan): A subordinate captain.
- Kechatch (ケチャッチ, Kechatchi): A subordinate captain.
- Ninth (ナインス, Nainsu): A subordinate captain.
- Reforte (リフォルト, Riforuto): A subordinate captain.
- Cands (キャンズ, Kyanzu): A long-necked subordinate captain who wears a giraffe-like hood.
- Colscon (コルスコン, Korusukon): A subordinate captain.
- Happygun (ハッピーガン, Happīgan): A subordinate captain.
- Forliewbs (フォーリュウブス, Fōryūbusu): A subordinate captain.
- Sleepy (スリーピー, Surīpī): An oval-shaped man who is A subordinate captain.

== Big Mom Pirates ==
Charlotte Family
Linlin "Big Mom" (Soul-Soul)
Name	Gender / Order	Devil Fruit	Sibling group	[Father] Tribe	Minister of
Perospero	M/01	(Lick-Lick)	?	?	Candy
Compote	F/01	—N/a	?	?	Fruits
Katakuri	M/02	(Mochi-Mochi)	triplets	?	Flour
Daifuku	M/03	(Puff-Puff)	triplets	?	Beans
Oven	M/04	(Heat-Heat)	triplets	?	Browned Foods
Mondée	F/02	—N/a	quadruplets	Snake-neck	?
Amande	F/03	—N/a	quadruplets	Snake-neck	Nuts
Hachée	F/04	—N/a	quadruplets	Snake-neck	?
Effilée	F/05	—N/a	quadruplets	Snake-neck	?
Opera	M/05	(Cream-Cream)	quintuplets	?	Whipped Cream
Counter	M/06	—N/a	quintuplets	?	?
Cadenza	M/07	—N/a	quintuplets	?	?
Cabaletta	M/08	—N/a	quintuplets	?	?
Gala	M/09	—N/a	quintuplets	?	?
Custard	F/06	—N/a	triplets	?	?
Cracker	M/10	(Bis-Bis)	triplets	?	Biscuits
Angel	F/07	—N/a	triplets	?	?
Zucotto	M/11	—N/a	?	?	Alcohol
Brulee	F/08	(Mirror-Mirror)	twins	?	?
Broyé	F/09	—N/a	twins	?	Meringue
Nusstorte	M/12	—N/a	triplets	?	Transport
Basskarte	M/13	—N/a	triplets	?	?
Dosmarche	M/14	—N/a	triplets	?	Tea
Noisette	M/15	—N/a	?	?	Finance
Moscato	M/16	—N/a	triplets	?	Gelato
Mash	F/10	—N/a	triplets	?	?
Cornstarch	F/11	—N/a	triplets	?	Love
Compo	M/17	—N/a	twins	?	Pie
Laurin	M/18	—N/a	twins	?	?
Mont-d'Or	M/19	(Book-Book)	?	?	Cheese
Mozart	F/12	—N/a	twins	?	?
Marnier	F/13	—N/a	twins	?	Yeast
High-Fat	M/20	—N/a	twins	?	?
Tablet	M/21	—N/a	twins	?	Toppings
Smoothie*	F/14	(Wring-Wring)	triplets	Long-leg	Juice
Citron	F/15	—N/a	triplets	Long-leg	Eggs
Cinnamon	F/16	—N/a	triplets	Long-leg	?
Saint-Marc	M/22	—N/a	twins	?	Essence
Basans	M/23	—N/a	twins	?	?
Melise	F/17	—N/a	?	?	?
Dacquoise	M/24	—N/a	?	?	Jam
Galette	F/18	(Butter-Butter)	twins	?	Butter
Poire	F/19	—N/a	twins	?	?
Snack	M/25	—N/a	twins	?	Fries
Bavarois	M/26	—N/a	twins	?	?
Prim	F/20	—N/a	twins	Octopus mermaid	?
Praline	F/21	—N/a	twins	Shark mermaid	?
Kanten	M/27	—N/a	triplets	?	Agar
Kato	M/28	—N/a	triplets	?	Seeds
Montb	M/29	—N/a	triplets	?	?
Chiboust	M/30	—N/a	—N/a	?	Mix
Chiffon	F/22	—N/a	twins	[Pound]	Puff
Lola	F/23	—N/a	twins	[Pound]	Chocolate (former)
Mobile	M/31	—N/a	quadruplets	Long-arm	Tasting
Marble	F/24	—N/a	quadruplets	Long-arm	?
Myukuru	F/25	—N/a	quadruplets	Long-arm	?
Maple	F/26	—N/a	quadruplets	Long-arm	?
Brownie	M/32	—N/a	—N/a	?	?
Joconde	F/27	—N/a	—N/a	?	?
Raisin	M/33	—N/a	—N/a	?	?
Panna	F/28	—N/a	—N/a	?	?
Mascarpone	M/34	—N/a	twins	Snake-neck	Tableware
Joscarpone	F/29	—N/a	twins	Snake-neck	?
Yuen	M/35	—N/a	—N/a	?	?
Newichi	M/36	—N/a	decuplets	?	?
Newji	M/37	—N/a	decuplets	?	?
Newsan	M/38	—N/a	decuplets	?	?
Newshi	M/39	—N/a	decuplets	?	?
Newgo	M/40	—N/a	decuplets	?	?
Nutmeg	F/30	—N/a	decuplets	?	?
Akimeg	F/31	—N/a	decuplets	?	?
Allmeg	F/32	—N/a	decuplets	?	?
Harumeg	F/33	—N/a	decuplets	?	?
Fuyumeg	F/34	—N/a	decuplets	?	?
Nougat	M/41	—N/a	—N/a	?	?
Pudding	F/35	(Memo-Memo)	—N/a	3-eyed	Chocolate
Flampe	F/36	—N/a	—N/a	?	Honey
Anglais	M/42	—N/a	—N/a	?	?
Wafers	F/37	—N/a	—N/a	?	?
Wiro	M/43	—N/a	—N/a	Snake-neck	?
De-Chat	M/44	—N/a	—N/a	Fish-man	?
Normande	F/38	—N/a	—N/a	Tontatta	?
Dolce	M/45	—N/a	twins	?	?
Dragée	M/46	—N/a	twins	?	?
Anana	F/39	—N/a	—N/a	?	?

The Big Mom Pirates (ビッグ・マム海賊団, Biggu Mamu Kaizokudan) are the crew led by the member of the Four Emperors, Charlotte Linlin. Each of its members are named after foods and are themed after different fairy tales. Some of them are ministers on the islands of Totto Land.

The Sun Pirates and the Fire Tank Pirates are former subordinates of the crew.

=== Charlotte Linlin ===
Charlotte Linlin (シャーロット・リンリン, Shārotto Rinrin), better known as Big Mom (ビッグ・マム, Biggu Mamu), is the 28 ft. captain of the Big Mom Pirates, the matriarch of the large Charlotte Family (シャーロット家, Shārotto-ke) and the queen of Totto Land, where she rules with her 46 sons and 39 daughters.

In her childhood, she was abandoned by her parents for being too big and was raised by Mother Carmel (マザー・カルメル, Mazā Karumeru), a nun who inspired her to create a kingdom and a family in which all the races of the world live together. At some point, Big Mom earned the ire of the giants after her eating disorder for semla during a fast before the Winter Solstice led to her rampage throughout Elbaph, which injured many giants. She has repeatedly tried to reconcile with the giants, but to no avail.

Big Mom's children include twenty-two single children, eleven sets of twins, six sets of triplets, two sets of quadruplets, one set of quintuplets, and one set of decuplets. None of her children are safe from her wrath.

Big Mom is also the only female member of the Four Emperors, and a former member of the Rocks Pirates. She currently has the second-highest bounty of any pirate after Kaido, with a bounty of 4,388,000,000.

Big Mom possesses the power of the Soul-Soul Fruit, which previously belonged to Carmel, with which she can give life to objects or make animals act like humans by giving them a fragment of a person's soul transforming them into Homies. Big Mom is capable of utilizing all three types of Haki and is capable of using the advanced application for both and Haoshoku and Busoshoku Haki.

Big Mom is voiced by Toshiko Fujita in Episode 571 of the original Japanese version and by Mami Koyama in later episodes starting in Episode 786 of the original Japanese version. In the Funimation dub, she is voiced by Pam Dougherty.

=== Sweet Generals ===
The Sweet Generals (スイート将星, Suīto Shōsei; Sweet Commanders) are the highest-ranking officers of the Big Mom Pirates. They were originally 4 Sweet Generals, but after one of them was defeated in past and demoted, they are known as the Sweet 3 Generals (スイート3将星, Suīto San Shōsei; Three Sweet Commanders).

- Charlotte Katakuri (シャーロット・カタクリ, Shārotto Katakuri) is Big Mom's second son and the Minister of Flour at Kumogi Island who has the power to generate mochi thanks to the powers of the Mochi-Mochi Fruit. Charlotte Katakuri is in the same triplet set as Charlotte Daifuku and Charlotte Oven and the oldest of the group. He also capable of utilizing all three types of Haki and is capable of using the advanced application for Kenbunshoku Haki. Charlotte Katakuri is voiced by Tomokazu Sugita in the original Japanese version and by Jonah Scott in the Funimation dub.
- Charlotte Smoothie (シャーロット・スムージー, Shārotto Sumūjī): Big Mom's 14th daughter and the Minister of Juice at %100 Island who has the ability to squeeze any object including living things thanks to the powers of the Wring-Wring Fruit. She is a longleg/human hybrid who is in the same triplet set as Charlotte Citron and Charlotte Cinnamon and the oldest of the group. Charlotte Smoothie is voiced by Masako Katsuki in the original Japanese version and by Dawn M. Bennett in the Funimation dub.
- Charlotte Cracker (シャーロット・クラッカー, Shārotto Kurakkā): Big Mom's 10th son and the Minister of Biscuits at Biscuits Island who has the ability to generate biscuits thanks to the powers of the Bis-Bis Fruit and even form Biscuit Soldiers. He is in the same triplet set as Charlotte Custard and Charlotte Angel and the oldest of the group. Charlotte Cracker is voiced by Takuya Kirimoto in the original Japanese version and by David Matranga in the Funimation dub.

=== Big Mom Pirates Officers ===
Officer positions are filled by the majority of Linlin's sons and daughters.

- Charlotte Perospero (シャーロット・ペロスペロー, Shārotto Perosuperō): Big Mom's 1st son and the Minister of Candy at Candy Island who has the ability to generate candy thanks to the powers of the Lick-Lick Fruit. Charlotte Perospero is voiced by Yūya Uchida in the original Japanese version and by Aaron Campbell in the Funimation dub.
- Charlotte Compote (シャーロット・コンポート, Shārotto Konpōto): Big Mom's 1st daughter and the Minister of Fruits at Fruits Island. Charlotte Compote is voiced by Mami Kingetsu in the original Japanese version and by Monica Rial in the Funimation dub.
- Charlotte Daifuku (シャーロット・ダイフク, Shārotto Daifuku) is Big Mom's 3rd son and the Minister of Beans at Poripori Island who can summon a genie from his body by rubbing himself thanks to the powers of the Puff-Puff Fruit. He is in the same triplet set as Charlotte Katakuri and Charlotte Oven. Charlotte Daifuku is voiced by Shunsuke Sakuya in the original Japanese version and by Frank Todaro in the Funimation dub.
- Charlotte Oven (シャーロット・オーブン, Shārotto Ōbun): Big Mom's 4th son and the Minster of Browned Foods at Yakigashi Island who has the power to generate heat thanks to the powers of the Heat-Heat Fruit. He is in the same triplet set as Katakuri and Daifuku and the youngest of the group. Oven is voiced by Masafumi Kimura in the original Japanese version and by Jason Marnocha in the Funimation dub.
- Charlotte Mondée (シャーロット・モンデ, Shārotto Monde): Big Mom's 2nd daughter. She is a snakeneck/human hybrid is in the same quadruplet set as Charlotte Amande, Charlotte Hachée, and Charlotte Effilée and the oldest of the group. Charlotte Mondée is voiced by Kimiko Saitō in the original Japanese version and by Natalie Van Sistine in the Funimation dub.
- Charlotte Amande (シャーロット・アマンド, Shārotto Amando): Big Mom's 3rd daughter and the Minister of Nuts at Nuts Island. She is a snakeneck/human hybrid and in the same quadruplet set as Charlotte Mondée, Charlotte Hachée, and Charlotte Effilée. Charlotte Amande is voiced by Wasabi Mizuta in the original Japanese version and by Terri Doty in the Funimation dub.
- Charlotte Hachée (シャーロット・アッシュ, Shārotto Asshu): Big Mom's 4th daughter. She is a snakeneck/human hybrid and is in the same quadruplet set as Charlotte Mondée, Charlotte Amande, and Charlotte Effilée.
- Charlotte Effilée (シャーロット・エフィレ, Shārotto Efire): Big Mom's 5th daughter. She is a snakeneck/human hybrid and is in the same quadruplet set as Charlotte Mondée, Charlotte Amande, and Charlotte Hachée and the youngest of the group. Charlotte Effilée is voiced by Aiko Hibi in the original Japanese version and by Alex Moore in the Funimation dub.
- Charlotte Opera (シャーロット・オペラ, Shārotto Opera): Big Mom's 5th son and the Minister of Whipped Cream at Noko Island who has the ability to generate cream thanks to the powers of the Cream-Cream Fruit. He is in the same quintuplet set as Charlotte Counter, Charlotte Cadenza, Charlotte Cabaletta, and Charlotte Gala and the oldest of the group. Charlotte Opera is voiced by Yoshihisa Kawahara in the original Japanese version and by Justin Duncan in the Funimation dub.
- Charlotte Counter (シャーロット・カウンター, Shārotto Kauntā): The 6th son of Big Mom. He is in the same quintuplet set as Charlotte Opera, Charlotte Candenza, Charlotte Cabaletta, and Charlotte Gala. Charlotte Counter is voiced by Tsuyoshi Koyama in the original Japanese version and by Nazeeh Tarsha in the Funimation dub.
- Charlotte Cadenza (シャーロット・カデンツァ, Shārotto Kadentsa): The 7th son of Big Mom. He is in the same quintuplet set as Charlotte Opera, Charlotte Counter, Charlotte Cabaletta, and Charlotte Gala. Charlotte Cadenza is voiced by Toshiaki Kuwahara in the original Japanese version and by Taylor Harris in the Funimation dub.
- Charlotte Cabaletta (シャーロット・カバレッタ, Shārotto Kabaretta): The 8th son of Big Mom. He is in the same quintuplet set as Charlotte Opera, Charlotte Counter, Charlotte Cadenza, and Charlotte Gala. Charlotte Cabaletta is voiced by Yoshihisa Kawahara in the original Japanese version and by Matt Thurston in the Funimation dub.
- Charlotte Gala (シャーロット・ガラ, Shārotto Gara): The 9th son of Big Mom. He is in the same quintuplet group as Charlotte Opera, Charlotte Counter, Charlotte Cadenza, and Charlotte Cabaletta.
- Charlotte Custard (シャーロット・カスタード, Shārotto Kasutādo): The 6th daughter of Big Mom. She is in the same triplet set as Charlotte Cracker and Charlotte Angel. Charlotte Custard is voiced by Yui Kano in the original Japanese version and by Kimberly Grace in the Funimation dub.
- Charlotte Angel (シャーロット・エンゼル, Shārotto Enzeru): The 7th daughter of Big Mom. She is in the same triplet set as Charlotte Cracker and Charlotte Custard and the youngest of the group.
- Charlotte Zuccotto (シャーロット・ズコット, Shārotto Zukotto): The 11th son of Big Mom and the Minister of Alcohol at Liqueur Island.
- Charlotte Brulee (シャーロット・ブリュレ, Shārotto Buryure): Big Mom's 8th daughter and the older twin sister of Broyé who has the power of mirrors thanks to the powers of the Mirror-Mirror Fruit which can also create reflections of people or trap them inside mirrors while gaining access to the Mirro-World. Her house is located in the Seducing Woods. Charlotte Brulee is voiced by Yūko Mita in the original Japanese version and by Rachel Robinson in the Funimation dub.
- Charlotte Broyé (シャーロット・ブロワイエ, Shārotto Burowaie): The 9th daughter of Big Mom and the younger twin sister of Charlotte Brulee who is the Minster of Meringue at Milenge Island.
- Charlotte Nusstorte (シャーロット・ヌストルテ, Shārotto Nusutorute): The 12th son of Big Mom and the Minister of Transport at Package Island. He is in the same triplet set as Charlotte Basskarte and Charlotte Dosmarche and the oldest of the group. Charlotte Nusstorte is voiced by Kazuya Nakai in the original Japanese version and by Brienne Olvera in the Funimation dub.
- Charlotte Basskarte (シャーロット・バスカルテ, Shārotto Basukarute): The 13th son of Big Mom. He is in the same triplet set as Charlotte Nusstorte and Charlotte Dosmarche. Charlotte Basskarte is voiced by Takahiro Fujiwara in the original Japanese version and by Michael Stimac in the Funimation dub.
- Charlotte Dosmarche (シャーロット・ドスマルシェ, Shārotto Dosumarushe): The 14th son of Big Mom and the Minister of Tea at Black Island. He is in the same triplet set as Charlotte Nusstorte and Charlotte Basskarte and the youngest of the group. Charlotte Dossmarche is voiced by Kappei Yamaguchi in the original Japanese version and by Jim Foronda in the Funimation dub.
- Charlotte Noisette (シャーロット・ノアゼット, Shārotto Noazetto): The 15th son of Big Mom and the Minister of Finance of Kinko Island. Charlotte Noisette is voiced by Keiichiro Yamamoto in the original Japanese version and by Jeff Johnson in the Funimation dub.
- Charlotte Moscato (シャーロット・モスカート, Shārotto Mosukāto) is the 16th son of Big Mom and the Minister of Gelato at Ice Island. He is in the same triplet set as Charlotte Mash and Charlotte Cornstarch and the oldest of the group. Charlotte Moscatto is voiced by Kazuya Ichijō and by Brad Kurtz in the Funimation dub.
- Charlotte Mash (シャーロット・マッシュ, Shārotto Masshu): The 10th daughter of Big Mom. She is in the same triple set as Charlotte Moscato and Charlotte Cornstarch. Charlotte Mash is voiced by Arisa Sekine in the original Japanese version and by Celeste Perez in the Funimation dub.
- Charlotte Cornstarch (シャーロット・コンスターチ, Shārotto Konsutāchi): The 11th daughter of Big Mom and the Minister of Love at Loving Island. She is in the same triplet set as Charlotte Moscato and Charlotte Mash and the youngest of the group. Charlotte Cornstarch is voiced by Maki Tsuruta in the original Japanese version and by Casie Ewulu in the Funimation dub.
- Charlotte Compo (シャーロット・コンポ, Shārotto Konpo) is the 17th son of Big Mom and the older twin brother of Charlotte Laurin who is the Minister of Pie at Piepie Island. Charlotte Compo is voiced by Takahiro Fujiwara in the original Japanese version and by Lee George in the Funimation dub.
- Charlotte Laurin (シャーロット・ラウリン, Shārotto Raurin): The 18th son of Big Mom and the younger twin brother of Charlotte Compo. Charlotte Laurin is voiced by Takahiro Fujiwara in the original Japanese version and by Matthew David Rudd in the Funimation dub.
- Charlotte Mont-d'Or (シャーロット・モンドール, Shārotto Mondōru) is Big Mom's 19th son and the Minister of Cheese at Cheese Island who can control the books and catch the people inside them thanks to the powers of the Book-Book Fruit. Charlotte Mont-d"Or is voiced by Atsushi Imaruoka in the Japanese version and by Cody Savoie in the Funimation dub.
- Charlotte Mozart (シャーロット・モーツアルト, Shārotto Mōtsaruto): The 12th daughter of Big Mom and the older twin sister of Charlotte Marnier.
- Charlotte Marnier (シャーロット・マルニエ, Shārotto Marunie): The 13th daughter of Big Mom and the younger twin sister of Charlotte Mozart who is the Minister of Yeast at Kibo Island. Charlotte Marnier is voiced by Yui Kano in the original Japanese version and by Heather Walker in the Funimation dub.
- Charlotte High-Fat (シャーロット・ハイファット, Shārotto Haifatto): The 20th son of Big Mom and the older twin brother of Charlotte Tablet. Charlotte High-Fat is voiced by Takahiro Fujiwara in the original Japanese version and by John Stimac in the Funimation dub.
- Charlotte Tablet (シャーロット・タブレット, Shārotto Taburetto): The 21st son of Big Mom and the younger twin brother of Charlotte High-Fat who is the Minister of Toppings at Topping Island. Charlotte Tablet is voiced by Kazuki Yao in the original Japanese version and by Cory Jordan Phillips in the Funimation dub.
- Charlotte Citron (シャーロット・シトロン, Shārotto Shitoron): The 15th daughter of Big Mom and the Minister of Eggs at Kimi Island. She is a longleg/human hybrid and is in the same triplet set as Charlotte Smoothie and Charlotte Cinnamon. Charlotte Citron is voiced by Hiromi Konno in the original Japanese version and by Heather Walker in the Funimation dub.
- Charlotte Cinnamon (シャーロット・シナモン, Shārotto Shinamon): The 16th daughter of Big Mom. She is a longleg/human hybrid and is in the same triplet set as Charlotte Smoothie and Charlotte Citron and the youngest of the group. Charlotte Cinnamon is voiced by Masami Suzuki in the original Japanese version and by Erica Muse in the Funimation dub.
- Charlotte Saint-Marc (シャーロット・サンマルク, Shārotto Sanmaruku): The 22nd son of Big Mom and the older twin brother of Charlotte Basans who is the Minister of Essence at Flavor Island. Charlotte Saint-Marc is voiced by Osamu Ryūtani in the original Japanese version and by John Stimac in the Funimation dub.
- Charlotte Basans (シャーロット・バサンズ, Shārotto Basanzu): The 23rd son of Big Mom and the younger twin brother of Charlotte Saint-Marc.
- Charlotte Melise (シャーロット・メリゼ, Shārotto Merize): The 17th daughter of Big Mom.
- Charlotte Dacquoise (シャーロット・ダクワーズ, Shārotto Dakuwāzu) is the 24th son of Big Mom with bat-like wings on his back and the Minister of Jam at Jam Island. Charlotte Dacquoise is voiced by Yoshihisa Kawahara in the original Japanese version.
- Charlotte Galette (シャーロット・ガレット, Shārotto Garetto): The 18th daughter of Big Mom and the older twin sister of Charlotte Poire who is the Minister of Butter at Margarine Island. She possesses the powers of the Butter-Butter Fruit which enables her to generate and control butter. Charlotte Galette is voiced by Ai Maeda in the original Japanese version and by Brianna Roberts in the Funimation dub.
- Charlotte Poire (シャーロット・ポワール, Shārotto Powāru): The 19th daughter of Big Mom and the younger twin sister of Charlotte Galetta. Charlotte Poire is voiced by Reimi in the original Japanese version and by Corinne Sudberg in the Funimation dub.
- Charlotte Snack (シャーロット・スナックスナック, Shārotto Sunakku): A former Sweet General, and Big Mom's 25th child who is the older twin brother of Charlotte Bavarois and the Minister of Fries at Potato Island. He lost his Sweet General position when he was defeated by Urouge and was reassigned to Charlotte Oven's army. Charlotte Snack is voiced by Jiro Saito in the original Japanese version and by Travis Mullenix in the Funimation dub.
- Charlotte Bavarois (シャーロット・ババロア, Shārotto Babaroa): The 26th son of Big Mom and the younger twin brother of Charlotte Snack. Charlotte Bavarois is voiced by Ryota Takeuchi in the original Japanese version and by Anthony DiMascio in the Funimation dub.
- Charlotte Prim (シャーロット・プリム, Shārotto Purimu): An octopus-type mermaid/human hybrid who is the 20th daughter of Big Mom and the older twin sister of Charlotte Praline of the Sun Pirates.
- Charlotte Kanten (シャーロット・カンテン, Shārotto Kanten): The 27th son of Big Mom and the Minister of Agar at Jelly Island. He is in the same triplet set as Charlotte Kato and Charlotte Motb and the oldest of the group.
- Charlotte Kato (シャーロット・カトウ, Shārotto Katō): The 28th son of Big Mom and the Minister of Seeds at Tanega Island. He has a Jack-o'lantern head and is in the same triplet set as Charlotte Kanten and Charlotte Montb. Charlotte Kato is voiced by Keiji Hirai in the original Japanese version and by Nicholas Corda in the Funimation dub.
- Charlotte Montb (シャーロット・モンブ, Shārotto Monbu): The 29th son of Big Mom. He is in the same triplet set as Charlotte Kanten and Charlotte Kato.
- Charlotte Chiboust (シャーロット・シブースト, Shārotto Shibūsuto): The 30th son of Big Mom and the Minister of Mix and Shanshoku Island. Charlotte Chiboust is voiced by Koji Haramaki in the original Japanese version and by Josh Putnam in the Funimation dub.
- Charlotte Mobile (シャーロット・モービル, Shārotto Mōbiru): The 31st son of Big Mom and the Minister of Tasting at Futoru Island. He is a longarm/human hybrid who is in the same quadruplet set as Charlotte Marble, Charlotte Myukuru, and Charlotte Maple and the oldest of the group. Charlotte Mobile is voiced by Yoshihashi Kawahara in the original Japanese version and by Comona Lewin in the Funimation dub.
- Charlotte Marble (シャーロット・マーブル, Shārotto Māburu): The 24th daughter of Big Mom. She is a longarm/human hybrid who is in the same quadruplet set as Charlotte Mobile, Charlotte Myukuru, and Charlotte Maple.
- Charlotte Myukuru (シャーロット・ミュークル, Shārotto Myūkuru): The 25th daughter of Big Mom. She is a longarm/human hybrid who is in the same quadruplet set as Charlotte Mobile, Charlotte Marble, and Charlotte Maple. Charlotte Myukuru is voiced by Momo Ishibashi in the original Japanese version and by Hayden Daviau in the Funimation dub.
- Charlotte Maple (シャーロット・メープル, Shārotto Mēpuru): The 26th daughter of Big Mom. She is a longarm/human hybrid who is in the same quadruplet set as Charlotte Mobile, Charlotte Marble, and Charlotte Myukuru.
- Charlotte Brownie (シャーロット・ブラウニー, Shārotto Buraunī): The 32nd son of Big Mom. Charlotte Brownie is voiced by Hiromi Miyazuki in the original Japanese version and by Tom Cullum in the Funimation dub.
- Charlotte Joconde (シャーロット・ジョコンド, Shārotto Jokondo): The 27th daughter of Big Mom. Charlotte Joconde is voiced by Hiroko Ishida in the original Japanese version and by Lisette Monique Diaz in the Funimation dub.
- Charlotte Raisin (シャーロット・レザン, Shārotto Rezan): The 33rd son of Big Mom. Charlotte Raisin is voiced by Yōhei Azakami in the original Japanese version and by Zeno Robinson in the Funimation dub.
- Charlotte Panna (シャーロット・パンナ, Shārotto Panna): The 28th daughter of Big Mom.
- Charlotte Mascarpone (シャーロット・マスカルポーネ, Shārotto Masukarupōne): The 34th son of Big Mom and the Minister of Tableware at Cutlery Island. He is a snakeneck/human hybrid and the older twin brother of Charlotte Joscarpone. Charlotte Mascarpone is voiced by Yūsuke Numata in the original Japanese version and by Van Barr Jr. in the Funimation dub.
- Charlotte Joscarpone (シャーロット・ジョスカルポーネ, Shārotto Josukarupōne): The 29th daughter of Big Mom. She is a snakeneck/human hybrid and the younger twin brother of Charlotte Mascarpone. Charlotte Joscarpone is voiced by Yuriko Yamaguchi in the original Japanese version and by Madeleine Morris in the Funimation dub.
- Charlotte Yuen (シャーロット・ユーエン, Shārotto Yūen): The 35th son of Big Mom. Charlotte Yuen is voiced by Makoto Yuruse in the original Japanese version and by Kyle Phillips in the Funimation dub.
- The Charlotte Decuplets (10つ子達, Juttsugo-tachi): The 36-40th sons of Big Mom and the 30-34th daughters of Big Mom. The males consist of Charlotte Newichi, Charlotte Newji, Charlotte Newson, Charlotte Newshi, and Charlotte Newgo. The females consist of Charlotte Nutmeg, Charlotte Akimeg, Charlotte Allmeg, Charlotte Harumeg, and Charlotte Fuyumeg. Newishi is the user of the Pile-Pile Fruit (ゴチャゴチャの実, Gocha Gocha no Mi), which allows him to fuse together with other people, using his power to fuse with his nine decuplet siblings into a giant lanky figure, fighting with an enlarged scythe.^{[ch. 900]}
  Newichi, Newji, Newshi, Newson, and Newgo are voiced by Ryōhei Arai, Hiroshi Okamoto, Yuta Kasuya, and Toshiya Chiba in the original Japanese version respectively. In the Funimation dub, they are voiced by Cedric Williams, Ben Balmaceda, Dylan Mobley, Garrett Storms, and Ry McKeand in the Funimation dub respectively.
  Nutmeg, Akimeg, Allmeg, Harumeg, and Fuyumeg are voiced by Chihiro Ikki, Momoko Soyama, Yūki Kaneko, Arisa Sekine, and Yui Kano in the original Japanese dub respectively. In the Funimation dub, they are voiced by Kristin Sutton, Meg McClain, Jad Saxton, Jennifer Alyx, and Veronica Laux respectively.
- Charlotte Nougat (シャーロット・ヌガー, Shārotto Nugā): The 41st son of Big Mom. Charlotte Nougat is voiced by Sōta Arai in the original Japanese version and by Andrew Love in the Funimation dub.
- Charlotte Pudding (シャーロット・プリン, Shārotto Purin): Big Mom's 35th daughter who is a descendant of the Three-Eyed People, often hiding the third eye on her forehead under a fringe, and a candidate for the position of Minister of Chocolate. She possesses the powers of the Memo-Memo Fruit which enables her to turn people's memories into film strips and manipulate their memories.^{[ch. 851]} Her mother and Vinsmoke Judge arranged a marriage between her and Sanji,^{[ch. 824]} which was interrupted by the Straw Hats and the Fire Tank Pirates.^{[ch. 863]} Although she tried to manipulate Sanji, she eventually developed feelings for him because he praised her third eye,^{[ch. 862]} which led her to help the Straw Hats escape from Totto Land.^{[ch. 874-902]} Time later, she was kidnapped by the Blackbeard Pirates,^{[ch. 1064 cover]} and taken to Hachinosu.^{[ch. 1126]} Charlotte Pudding is voiced by Miyuki Sawashiro in earlier episodes of the original Japanese version and by Houko Kuwashima in later episodes of the original Japanese version, while in the Funimation dub she is voiced by Jill Harris.
- Charlotte Flampe (シャーロット・フランペ, Shārotto Furanpe): Big Mom's 36th daughter and the Minister of Honey at Rokumitsu Island who is a great admirer of Charlotte Katakuri. Charlotte Flampe is voiced by Chiwa Saitō in the original Japanese version and by Marianne Bray in the Funimation dub.

=== Combatants ===
The crew Combatants include:

- Pekoms (ペコムズ, Pekomuzu): A lion-type mink who can turn into a turtle or a turtle-mink hybrid via the Turtle-Turtle Fruit. He later betrayed the Big Mom Pirates to help the Straw Hat Crew escape Totto Land. Pekoms is voiced by Nobuo Tobita in the original Japanese version and by Christopher Guerrero in the Funimation dub.
- Tamago (タマゴ, Tamago): An egg-shaped man originating from the Longleg Tribe and the partner of Pekoms who can change his appearance to chick, rooster, and egg form again thanks to the powers of the Egg-Egg Fruit. Tamago is voiced by Mugihito in the original Japanese version and by David Wald in the Funimation dub.
- Bobbin (ボビン, Bobin): A short and broad man. Bobbin is voiced by Tsubasa Yonaga in the original Japanese version and by Aaron Roberts in the Funimation dub.
- Capone Bege is a former combatant of the crew.

=== Homies ===
The Homies (ホーミーズ, Hōmīzu) are creatures that Big Mom can create with her Devil Fruit by infusing objects or animals with soul fragments. The Vivre Card created by Big Mom can be used to control the Homies.

The three objects close to her who have a fragment of her own soul are:

- Napoleon (ナポレオン, Naporeon): A Homie created from Big Mom's tricorn. Napoleon is voiced by Yū Mizushima in the original Japanese version and by Aaron Campbell in the Funimation dub.
- Prometheus (プロメテウス, Purometeusu): A sun Homie. Prometheus is voiced by Yū Mizushima in the original Japanese version and by Alex Mai in the Funimation dub.
- Zeus: A thundercloud Homie, who left the Big Mom Pirates to become Nami's battle companion.

Big Mom later created two more Homies with a fragment of her own soul who were loyal to her:

- Hera (ヘラ, Hera): A thundercloud Homie who Big Mom created as a replacement for Zeus. Hera is voiced Yumi Kakazu in the original Japanese version.
- Misery (三千里, Mizarī): A female genie-like Homie who Big Mom created from the combination of Prometheus, Hera, and Napoleon's attacks during the raid on Onigashima.

The following are other Homies created by Big Mom:

- Queen Mama Chanter (クイーン・ママ・シャンテ号, Kuīn Mama Shante-gō): A Homie created from the ship of the Big Mom Pirates. Queen Mama Chanter is voiced by Keiji Hirai in the original Japanese version and by Oscar Seung in the Funimation dub.
- Nitro (ニトロ, Nitoro): A jelly Homie who is often seen with Charlotte Pudding. Nitro is voiced by Kappei Yamaguchi in the original Japanese version and by Cedric Williams in the Funimation dub.
- Rabiyan (ラビヤン, Rabiyan): A magic carpet Homie who is often seen with Charlotte Pudding while serving as her mode of transportation. Rabiyan is voiced by Hiroshi Okamoto in the original Japanese version and by Caleb Yen in the Funimation dub.
- Randolph (ランドルフ, Randorufu): A humanoid rabbit Homie and a member of the Big Mom Pirates. Randolph is voiced by Kappei Yamaguchi in the original Japanese version and by Caleb Yen in the Funimation dub.
- Noble Croc (貴族ワニ, Kizoku Wani): A humanoid crocodile Homie who lives in Whole Cake Island's Seducing Woods. Noble Croc is voiced by Sōta Arai in the original Japanese version and by Dallas Reid in the Funimation dub.
- Kingbaum (キングバーム, Kingubāmu): A tree Homie who lives in Whole Cake Island's Seducing Woods which he is the master of. Kingbaum is voiced by Takahiro Fujiwara in the original Japanese version and by Jeremy Inman in the Funimation dub.
- Lady Tree (レディツリー, Redi Tsurī): A tree Homie who lives in Whole Cake Island's Seducing Woods and is Kingbaum's fiancée. Lady Tree is voiced by Yui Kano in the original Japanese version and by Olivia Swasey in the Funimation dub.
- The Chess Soldiers (チェス戎兵, Chesu Jūhei): A group of Homies created from chess pieces. They serve as the military force of Totto Land.

=== Other Big Mom Pirates ===
The following are the rest of the members of the Big Mom Pirates:

- Charlotte Anglais (シャーロット・アングレ, Shārotto Angure): The 42nd son of Big Mom who rides a motorized metal caterpillar. Charlotte Anglais is voiced by Masami Kikuchi in the original Japanese version and by Marti Ethridge in the Funimation dub.
- Charlotte Dulce (シャーロット・ドルチェ, Shārotto Doruche) and Charlotte Dragée (シャーロット・ドラジェ, Shārotto Doraje): The 45th and 46th twin sons of Big Mom. Dolce and Dragée are voiced by Aiko Hibi and Yukiko Morishita in the original Japanese version and are both voiced by Dallas Reid in the Funimation dub.
- Charlote Anana (シャーロット・アナナ, Shārotto Anana): The 39th daughter of Big Mom and the youngest of her daughters as well as her being the youngest of her children. She has a habit of mutilating her stuffed animals and annoying Dolce and Dragée by popping their balloons. Anana is voiced by Naomi Ōzora in the original Japanese version and by Madeleine Morris in the Funimation dub.
- Streusen (シュトロイゼン, Shutoroizen): An elderly man who is the executive chef of the Big Mom Pirates and possesses the power of the Cook-Cook Fruit, which enables him to turn any object into food. Having accompanied Big Mom since her youth, he followed her onto the Rocks Pirates, where he served as a member until its disbandment.^{[ch. 1156]} He was also responsible for helping Big Mom in establishing Totto Land. Streusen is voiced by Haruhiko Jō in the original Japanese version and by Ben Phillips in the Funimation dub.
- Diesel (ディーゼル, Dīzeru): A Longarm Tribe member who wears a hat that resembles a steam locomotive and aspires to be fast. Diesel is voiced by Ken Uo in the original Japanese version and by Spencer Liles in the Funimation dub.

== Animal Kingdom Pirates ==
Animal Kingdom Pirates
Kaido "King of the Beasts" (Fish-Fish: Azure Dragon)
Lead Performers	King "Wildfire"		Queen "The Plague"		Jack "The Drought"	
Lead Performers	Lunarian (Dragon-Dragon: Pteranodon)		Cyborg (Dragon-Dragon: Brachiosaurus)		Fish-Man (Elephant-Elephant: Mammoth)	
Tobi Roppo	Page One	Ulti	Sasaki	Black Maria	Who's Who	X. Drake
Tobi Roppo	(Dragon-Dragon: Spinosaurus)	(Dragon-Dragon: Pachycephalosaurus)	(Dragon-Dragon: Triceratops)	(Spider-Spider: Rosamygale Grauvogeli)	(Cat-Cat: Saber-tooth Tiger)	(Dragon-Dragon: Allosaurus)
Shinuchi (selected)	Basil Hawkins	Scratchmen Apoo	Hold'em	Speed	Dobon	Babanuki
Shinuchi (selected)	(Straw-Straw)	(Tone-Tone)	(SMILE: Lion / belly)	(SMILE: Horse / legs)	(SMILE: Hippopotamous / mouth)	(SMILE: Elephant / belly)
Gifters (successful SMILE)	Alpacaman, Gazelleman, Madilloman					
Pleasures (failed SMILE)	—N/a					
Waiters (no SMILE)	—N/a					
Numbers (giants)	Jaki, Nangi, Hatcha					

The Animal Kingdom Pirates (百獣海賊団, Hyakujū Kaizokudan; lit. Beasts Pirates) are the crew led by Kaido, one of the Four Emperors. They allied with the Kurozumi Family to take over the Wano Country. Most members possess powers of the SMILE Devil Fruits created by Caesar Clown, being able to obtain the abilities of a specific animal, but having only partially a part of the animal.

=== Kaido ===
Kaido (カイドウ, Kaidō), also known as "Kaido, The King of the Beasts" (百獣のカイドウ, Hyakujū no Kaidō; lit. "Kaido of the Beasts"), is the 23 ft. Supreme Commander (総督, Sōtoku; Governor-General) of the Animal Kingdom Pirates, a former member of the Four Emperors, and also a former member of the Rocks Pirates as an apprentince. Kaido consumed the Fish-Fish Fruit: Model Azure Dragon which enables him to transform into an Azure Dragon or an Azure Dragon-human hybrid. It is later revealed that Big Mom intended to give the Fish-Fish Fruit to Charlotte Katakuri before Kaido stole it.^{[ch. 1160]}^{[ch. 1165]}

Kaido's a believer in might makes right and has subjugated several pirates by breaking their wills. He's rather unstable and prone to changing his mind as he both wants a death as glorious as Whitebeard, but also wants a worthy enemy as he has spent a long time without any opponent that matched his power, along with often shifting from open cruelty and mocking to respect towards his adversaries. Kaido was on the verge of being executed several times and has a fondness for attempting suicide as a hobby, but he always ends up unscathed due to his great resilience, being known in the world as "The Strongest Creature" (最強の生物, Saikyō no Seibutsu).

For years he was controlling Kurozumi Orochi, the Shogun of Wano. They did this by boiling alive Kozuki Oden, and forced their way to becoming the Shogun. His headquarters is at Onigashima, which was invaded by the alliance formed by the Kozuki family allies, the Straw Hat Crew, and the Heart Pirates, defeating his officers, and with him ended up being defeated by Monkey D. Luffy.

Kaido is voiced by Tesshō Genda in the original Japanese version and by David Sobolov in the Funimation dub.

=== Lead Performers ===
The three men who act as Kaido's right hand are the Lead Performers (大看板, Ōkanban; All-Stars), the crew's executive officers, also known as the Disasters/Calamities.

- King (キング, Kingu): Born Arber (アルベル, Aruberu), is a Lunarian who can transform into a Pteranodon or a Pteranodon-human hybrid using the powers of the Dragon-Dragon Fruit: Model Pteranodon (リュウリュウの実 モデル プテラノドン, Ryū Ryū no Mi Moderu Puteranodon). King has the epithet of "The Conflagration/Wildfire". At one point, King and Kaido were held on Punk Hazard. His Lineage Factor was later used by Dr. Vegapunk to create his Seraphim. King is voiced by Makoto Tamura in the original Japanese version and by Gabe Kunda in the Funimation dub.
- Queen (クイーン, Kuīn): A cyborg scientist who can transform into a Brachiosaurus or a Brachiosaurus-human hybrid using the powers of the Dragon-Dragon Fruit: Model Brachiosaurus (リュウリュウの実 モデル ブラキオサウルス, Ryū Ryū no Mi Moderu Burakiosaurusu). Queen has the epithet of "The Plague". Queen is also a former colleague of Caesar Clown, Vinsmoke Judge, Dr. Vegapunk, and Buckingham Stussy as a part of MADS, a group of scientists. Born Scien (サイエン, Saien), he is the father of Cutty Flam, abandoning him out of hatred of his preference of mechanical inventions prior to his scientific career.^{[vol. 113:SBS]} Queen is voiced by Hiroki Takahashi in the original Japanese version and by Major Attaway in the Funimation dub.
- Jack (ジャック, Jakku): A giant grouper-type fish-man who can transform into a mammoth or a mammoth-human hybrid with a centaur-like appearance using the powers of the Elephant-Elephant Fruit: Model Mammoth (ゾウゾウの実 モデル "マンモス", Zō Zō no Mi: Moderu Manmosu). Jack has the epithet of "The Drought". Jack is voiced by Ken Nomura in the original Japanese version and by Bill Butts in the Funimation dub.

=== Tobi Roppo ===
The Tobi Roppo (飛び六胞, Tobi Roppō; lit. "Flying Six Fellows") are the six elite Headliners and the crew's first grade officers who serve directly under the Lead Performers. Like the Lead Performers, the members can transform into ancient creatures through their Ancient Zoan Devil Fruits.

- Page One (ページワン, Pējiwan): A Shinuchi and Ulti's younger brother whose Devil Fruit called the Dragon-Dragon Fruit: Model Spinosaurus enables him to transform into a Spinosaurus or a Spinosaurus-human hybrid. Page One is voiced by Yutaka Aoyama in the original Japanese version and by Tom Laflin in the Funimation dub.
- Ulti (うるティ, Uruti): A Shinuchi and Page One's elder sister whose Devil Fruit called the Dragon-Dragon Fruit: Model Pachycephalosaurus enables her to transform into a Pachycephalosaurus or a Pachycephalosaurus-human hybrid. Ulti is voiced by Tomoyo Kurasawa in the original Japanese version and by Christina Kelly in the Funimation dub.
- Sasaki (ササキ, Sasaki): A bluespine unicornfish-type fish-man and Shinuchi whose Devil Fruit called the Dragon-Dragon Fruit: Model Triceratops enables him to transform into a Triceratops or a Triceratops-human hybrid. In Triceratops form, Sasaki can rotate his frill to move through the air. Sasaki is voiced by Volcano Ōta in the original Japanese version and by Heath Morrow in the Funimation dub.
- Black Maria (ブラックマリア, Burakkumaria): A Shinuchi whose Devil Fruit called the Spider-Spider Fruit: Model Rosamygale Grauvogeli enables her to transform into a Rosamygale or a Rosamygale-human hybrid. Black Maria is voiced by Yū Kobayashi in the original Japanese version and by Alicyn Packard in the Funimation dub.
- Who's-Who (フーズ・フー, Fūzu Fū): A Shinuchi whose Devil Fruit called the Cat-Cat Fruit: Model Saber-Tooth Tiger enables him to transform into a saber-toothed tiger or a saber-toothed tiger-human hybrid. Who's-Who is voiced by Hirofumi Nojima in the original Japanese version and by Reagan Murdock in the Funimation dub.
- X. Drake was formerly a member of this group.

=== Headliners ===
The Headliners (真打ち, Shin'uchi) are the second-grade officers of the Animal Kingdom Pirates. Most of them are elite Gifters who utilize SMILE fruits, Many of its members defect after being tamed by Kurozumi Tama's Devil Fruit ability, which allows her to control animals and animal hybrids.

Known Headliners include:

- Basil Hawkins
- Sheepshead (シープスヘッド, Shīpusuheddo): A Shinuchi who possesses sheep horns in place of hands. Sheepshead is voiced by Katsuyuki Konishi in the original Japanese version and by Armen Taylor in the Funimation dub.
- Holed'em (ホールデム, Hōrudemu): A Shinuchi who possesses the head and legs of a lion named Kamijiro (噛二郎, Kamijirō) on his waist and a lion tail on his back. Holed'em and Kamijiro are voiced by Tsuyoshi Koyama in the original Japanese version and by Davon Oliver in the Funimation dub.
- Speed (スピード, Supīdo): A Shinuchi who has a centaur-like appearance. Speed is voiced by Satomi Satō in the original Japanese version and by Naya Moreno in the Funimation dub.
- Dobon (ドボン): A Shinuchi who has the body of a pink hippopotamus, with his human body being contained in the hippopotamus' mouth. Dobon is voiced by Taro Yamaguchi in the Japanese version and by Phillip Annarella in the Funimation dub.
- Ginrummy (ジンラミー, Jinramī): A Shinuchi who has large squirrel-like cheeks that become visible when she eats. Ginrummy is voiced by Sakiko Uran in the original Japanese version and by Katelyn Gault in the Funimation dub.
- Babanuki (ババヌキ): A Shinuchi and the warden of the Prisoner Mine who has an elephant head on his chest. Babanuki is voiced by Susumu Akagi in the original Japanese version and by Alex Hom in the Funimation dub.
- Daifugo (ダイフゴー, Daifugō): A Shinuchi who has a scorpion stinger in place of hair and six legs. Daifugo is voiced by Tōru Nakane in the original Japanese version and by Josh Martin in the Funimation dub.
- Solitaire (ソリティア, Soritia): A Shinuchi who has a monkey tail and two additional pairs of arms. Solitaire is voiced by Umeka Shōji in the original Japanese version and by Kayla Parker in the Funimation dub.
- Mizerka (ミゼルカ, Mizeruka): A Shinuchi who has a pink-furred gorilla named Gorishiro (ゴリシロ, Gorishiro) growing from her waist. Mizerka is voiced by Arisa Sekine in the original Japanese version and by Rowan Gilvie in the Funimation dub.
- Briscola (ブリスコラ, Burisukora): A Shinuchi who has a gorilla growing from his left hand. Briscola is voiced by Yasuhiro Mamiya in the original Japanese version and by Mac McGee in the Funimation dub.
- Fourtricks (フォートリックス, Fōtorikkusu): A Shinuchi who has a chicken-like body, with his face and arms at its rear end. Fourtricks is voiced by Kōhei Amasaki in the original Japanese version and by Jim Foronda in the Funimation dub.
- Hamlet (ハムレット, Hamuretto): A Shinuchi who has a giraffe's body emerging from his upper back. Hamlet is voiced by Ryōta Takeuchi in the original Japanese version and by Alan Lee in the Funimation dub.
- Poker (ポーカー, Pōkā): A Shinuchi who has rattlesnakes in place of legs. Poker is voiced by Tomohisa Hashizume in the original Japanese version and by Matthew Elkins in the Funimation dub.
- The Doubt Brothers (ダウト兄弟, Dauto Kyōdai): Two Shinuchi who possess unknown owl-based abilities.

=== Gifters ===
The Gifters (与えられた者達, Gifutāzu) are the elite soldiers of the Animal Kingdom Pirates. They all wield variants of the SMILE fruit. Many of its members defect after being tamed by Kurozumi Tama's Devil Fruit ability.

Known Gifters include:

- Batman (バットマン, Battoman): A Gifter who has bat ears and wings. Batman is voiced by Junji Kitajima in the original Japanese version and by Brandon Solis in the Funimation dub.
- Gazelleman (ガゼルマン, Gazeruman): A Gifter who has the hindquarters of a gazelle, enabling him to run at superhuman speeds. Gazelleman is voiced by Yasunori Masutani in the original Japanese version and by Josh Bangle in the Funimation dub.
- Mouseman (マウスマン, Mausuman): A Gifter who has the ears of a mouse. Mouseman is voiced by Masami Kikuchi in the original Japanese version and by Parker Gray in the Funimation dub.
- Snakeman (スネークマン, Sunēkuman): A Gifter who has a snake protruding from his abdomen. Snakeman is voiced by Masaya Takatsuka in the original Japanese version and by Dalton Walker in the Funimation dub.
- Rabbitman (ラビットマン, Rabbitoman): A Gifter who has rabbit ears on his shoulders, a rabbit face on his beard, and a rabbit tail. Rabbitman is voiced by Kappei Yamaguchi in the original Japanese version and by Gary Furlong in the Funimation dub.
- Sarahebi (さらへび先生, Sarahebi-sensei): A teacher in Wano's Flower Capital loyal to Black Maria who has a snake-like neck, fangs, and tongue. Sarahebi is voiced by Yuka Komatsu in the original Japanese version and by Emily Fajardo in the Funimation dub.
- Alpacaman (アルパカマン, Arupakaman): A Gifter who has an alpaca-like head. Alpacaman is voiced by Takeharu Onishi in the original Japanese version and by Bryson Baugus in the Funimation dub.
- Madilloman (マジロマン, Majiroman): A Gifter who has an armadillo's shell on his back. Madilloman is voiced by Toshitsugu Takashina in the original Japanese version and by Gary Furlong in the Funimation dub.
- Dachoman (ダチョウマン, Dachōman): A Gifter who has the neck of an ostrich. Dachoman is voiced by Hiromi Miyazuki in the original Japanese version and by Kiba Walker in the Funimation dub.
- Tenjo-Sagari (天井下り, Tenjō-Sagari): A Gifter loyal to Black Maria who has snake-like fangs and an extendable torso. Tenjo-Sagari is voiced by Momo Ishibashi in the original Japanese version and by Givoannie Cruz in the Funimation dub.
- Nure-Onna (濡れ女, Nure-Onna): A Gifter loyal to Black Maria who has the neck of a hognose snake. Nure-Onna is voiced by Yūki Yamamoto in the original Japanese version and by Morgan Lauré Garrett in the Funimation dub.
- Wanyudo (輪入道, Wanyūdō): A Gifter who has the body of a pug while retaining his human head. He can move around on a hamster wheel-like device that serves as his mode of transportation. Wanyudo is voiced by Mark Fickert in the Funimation dub.
- Hawkman (ホークマン, Hōkuman): A Gifter who has a green hawk growing out of his back, with its head serving as a hood and its wings granting him flight. Hawkman is voiced by Hiromi Miyazaki in the original Japanese version.
- Agehe Woman (AGEHAウーマン, Ageha Ūman): A Gifter who has the antenna and wings of a swallowtail butterfly. Ageha Woman is voiced by Mai Aizawa in the original Japanese version and by Emily Lopez in the Funimation dub.
- Koshi Falcon (KOSHIファルコン, Koshi Farukon): A Gifter who has pink peregrine falcon wings on his lower back.
- Horseman (ホースマン, Hōsuman): A Gifter and an attendant of Bao Huang who has the head of a horse and superhuman speed. Horseman is voiced by Kazumasa Fukugawa in the original Japanese version.
- Beegirl (ビーガール, Bīgāru): A Gifter who has wasp wings and additional arms.
- Jumper (ジャンパー, Janpā): A Gifter who has Chinese grasshopper mandibles and wings.
- Battaman (バッタマン, Battaman): A Gifter who can sharpen his fingers into grasshopper-like claws.
- Kamakirigirl (カマキリガール, Kamakirigāru): A Gifter who has mantis claws in place of hands. Kamakirigirl is voiced by Hitomi Ueda in the original Japanese version and by Monét Lerner in the Funimation dub.
- Redwolf (レッドウルフ, Reddo Urufu): A Gifter whose Wolf SMILE variant gives him a wolf-like torso emerging from his midriff.
- Bishonure-Onna (びしょ濡れ女, Bishonure-Onna): A Gifter loyal to Black Maria who can unhinge her jaw like a python and secrete mucus.
- Yamanba (山姥, Yamanba): An above average height Gifter loyal to Black Maria whose Japanese Rat Snake SMILE ability is unknown.
- Trio the Grip (トリオ・ザ・グリップ, Torio za Gurippu): Three unnamed anime-exclusive Gifters who partook in the attack on Zou. They respectively possess a bat for a forearm, the right arm of a snake, and the left arm of a crab.
- Bearman (ベアマン, Beaman): An anime-exclusive Gifter who resembles an anthropomorphic green bear with his human face being contained in the bear's mouth. Bearman is voiced by Ken Uo in the original Japanese version and by Jonathan Rigg in the Funimation dub.

=== Armored Division ===
The Armored Division (装甲部隊, Sōkō Butai) is a group of Shinuchis and Gifters who work for Sasaki and ate SMILE Fruits that are based on animals who are hard-skinned animals or hard-shelled animals. Many of its members defect after being tamed by Kurozumi Tama's Devil Fruit ability.

- Saitank (サイタンク, Saitanku): A Gifter and a member of the Armored Division who has a rhinoceros in place of his legs, with his waist emerging from the back of the rhinoceros' neck.
- Bisley (ビズリー, Bizurī): A Shinuchi and a member of the Armored Division who has hedgehog quills in place of hair.
- Scorpionlady (スコーピオンレディ, Sukōpionredi) is a Gifter and a member of the Armored Division who has the claws and legs of a scorpion.
- Usunoro (うすのろ, Usunoro): A Shinuchi and a member of the Armored Division who has the lower body of a giant tortoise.
- Nokokuwa Police (ノコクワポリス, Nokokuwaporisu): A tall muscular Shinuchi and a member of the Armored Division who has Japanese stag beetle mandibles on his shoulders and additional arms.
- Beetleman (ビートルマン, Bītoruman): A Gifter and a member of the Armored Division who has a rhinceros beetle horn and additional arms.
- Caucasusman (コーカサス人, Kōkasasuhito): A Gifter and a member of the Armored Division who has the horns of a caucasus beetle and additional arms.

=== Marys ===
The Marys (メアリーズ, Mearīzu) are the surveillance crew of the Animal Kingdom Pirates. They consist of humans and cyborg animals who wear paper masks and utilize SMILE fruits.

- Bao Huang (バオファン, Baofan): A Shinuchi and member of the Marys who has a large flying squirrel tail and gliding abilities. Bao Huang is voiced by Ryoko Shiraishi in the original Japanese version and by Molly Zhang in the Funimation dub.
- Caimanlady (カイマンレディ, Kaiman Redi): A Gifter and member of the Marys who has a backwards-facing caiman in place of her legs. Caimanlady is voiced by Maki Tsuruta in the original Japanese version.
- Chochinman (提灯マン, Chōchinman): A Gifter and member of the Marys who has elongated limbs as the result of eating a Phasmid SMILE.

=== Numbers ===
The Numbers (ナンバーズ, Nanbāzu) are a group of artificial animalistic giants who were created by Punk Hazard and serve the Animal Kingdom Pirates. They are also known to be messy drinkers which annoys Queen.

- Inbi (一美, Inbi): A Number who has a devil-like appearance. Inbi is voiced by Yōhei Azakami in the original Japanese version and by Jordan Dash Cruz in the Funimation dub.
- Fuga (二牙, Fūga): A 121 ft. Number who has a centaur-like appearance due to consuming a Horse SMILE variant. Fuga is voiced by Takayuki Kondo in the original Japanese version and by Brandon Solis in the Funimation dub.
- Zanki (三鬼, Zanki): A Number who has slender outward horns. Zanki is voiced by Kōji Takeda in the original Japanese version and by Comona Lewin in the Funimation dub.
- Jaki (四鬼, Jaki): A Number who has tusks. Jaki is voiced by Yasunori Masutani in the original Japanese version and by Kamen Casey in the Funimation dub.
- Goki (五鬼, Gōki): A Number who has a long neck. Goki is voiced by Masaya Takatsuka in the original Japanese version and by Jarrod Greene in the Funimation dub.
- Rokki (六鬼, Rokki): A Number who is bald, has black horns, body hair, and tattoos.
- Nangi (七鬼, Nangi): A Number who resembles an Oni and has green hair. Nangi is voiced by Yūsei Oda in the original Japanese version and by Kellen Goff in the Funimation dub.
- Hatcha (八茶, Hatcha): A 120 ft. Number with horns. Hatcha is voiced by Hirofumi Miyazaki in the original Japanese version and by Alejandro Saab in the Funimation dub.
- Kunyun (九忍, Kunyun): A Number who has horns and snake-like fangs. Kunyun is voiced by Hinako Takahishi in the original Japanese version and by Dani Chambers in the Funimation dub.
- Juki (十鬼, Jūki): A hunchbacked Number who has an elongated dragon-like head and a hunchbacked appearance. Juki is voiced by Kōji Haramaki in the original Japanese version and by Alfie Coy in the Funimation dub.

=== Pleasures ===
The Pleasures (笑う者達, Purejāzu) are mid-level foot soldiers who ate dud SMILE Fruits and can only feel joy. Many of them defect after Tony Tony Chopper saves them from the Ice Oni virus that Queen created.

=== Waiters ===
The Waiters (待つ者達, Weitāzu) are low-level foot soldiers who lack SMILE powers. Many of them defect after Tony Tony Chopper saves them from the Ice Oni virus that Queen created.

- Massui (マッスイ, Massui): A muscular Waiter who wears a bat mask. Massui is voiced by Tomahisa Hashizumi in the original Japanese version and by Spencer Liles in the Funimation dub.
- Pudos (プドス, Pudosu): A tall Waiter who works as Prisoner Mine guard. Pudos is voiced by Geoff Galneda in the Funimation dub.
- Ibiributsu (イビリブツ, Ibiributsu): A stocky Waiter who works as a Prisoner Mine guard. All prisoners must give him meal tickets in exchange for kibi dango. Ibiributsu is voiced by Spencer Liles in the Funimation dub.
- Donannoyo (ドウナンノヨ, Dōnannoyo): A Waiter who works as a Prisoner Mine guard. Donannoyo is voiced by Dalton Tindall in the Funimation dub.
- Nokotti (ノコッティ, Nokotti): A female slender Waiter who works as a Prisoner Mine guard. When Queen holds the Sumo Inferno at the Prisoner Mine, Nokotti serves as its Gyōji.
- Uwattsura (ウワッツラー, Uwattsurā): A muscular Waiter who works as the Prisoner Mine's chief guard. Uwattsura is voiced by Brad Kurtz in the Funimation dub.

=== Ninjas and samurai ===
There are several ninjas and samurai who serve the Animal Kingdom Pirates following the apparent death of Kurozumi Orochi. The ninjas made up a group called Orochi's Oniwabanshu (オロチお庭番衆, Orochi Oniwabanshū) when they worked for Orochi, while the samurai made up a group called the Mimawari-gumi (見廻組), Wano's samurai police force. Only Fukurokuju stayed loyal to Orochi after Kaido betrayed him, with the rest officially joining the Animal Kingdom Pirates.

- Fukurokuju (福ロクジュ, Fukurokuju): A tall bald-headed ninja with an elongated head and long earlobes who leads the ninjas and samurai. Fukurokuji is voiced by Masahiro Ogata in the original Japanese version and by Nazeeh Tarza in the Funimation dub.
- Daikoku (大黒, Daikoku): A large ninja with red hair and a horned headband. Daikoku is voiced by Takashi Matsuyama in the original Japanese version and by Monty Thompson in the Funimation dub.
- Fujin (風刃, Fūjin): A ninja who uses a terrestrial catfish as his mode of transportation. Fujin is voiced by Yusuke Honda in the original Japanese version and by Zac Loera in the Funimation dub.
- Raijin (雷刃, Raijin): A ninja in a blue and yellow goggled mask who uses a terrestrial catfish as his mode of transportation. Raijin is voiced by Kappei Yamaguchi in the original Japanese version and by Landon McDonald in the Funimation dub.
- Hanzo (半ぞう, Hanzō): A large and thickset ninja. Hanzo is voiced by Kohei Fukuhara in the original Japanese version and by Jason Lord in the Funimation dub.
- Chome (ちょめ, Chome): A young kunoichi with armpit-length hair and a rabbit-like face. Chome is voiced by Ayaka Saitō in the original Japanese version and by Shelby Chambers in the Funimation dub.
- Jigoku Benten (地獄弁天, Jigoku Benten): A tall kunoichi. Jugoku Benten is voiced by Akiko Utsumi in the original Japanese version and by Kasi Hollowell in the Funimation dub.
- Bishamon (ビシャ門, Bishamon): A short red-skinned ninja. Bishamon is voiced by Ikuto Kanemasa in the original Japanese version and by Stephen Miller in the Funimation dub.
- Yazaemon (矢ざえもん, Yazaemon): A hunched over ninja with a bandaged face. Yazaemon is voiced by Takahiro Fujimoto in the original Japanese version and by Howard Wang in the Funimation dub.
- Kazekage (風影, Kazekage): A ninja with waist-like hair and is mostly seen carrying a scroll in his mouth. Kazekage is voiced by Shogo Sakata in the original Japanese version and by Branden Loera in the Funimation dub.
- Sarutobi (猿飛, Sarutobi): A large ninja who wears a horned gorilla-like mask. Sarutobi is voiced by Keiji Hirai in the original Japanese version and by Chris Niosi in the Funimation dub.
- Hotei (ホテイ, Hotei): A samurai and former captain of the Mimawarigumi prior to Kurozumi Orochi being deposed by Kaido. Hotei is voiced by Masaya Takatsuka in the original Japanese version and by Kieran Flitton in the Funimation dub.
- Jizo (地蔵, Jizō): A tall and rotund samurai and former member of the Mimawarigumi. Jizo is voiced by Toshiya Chiba in the original Japanese version and by John Gerhardt in the Funimation dub.

=== Other Animal Kingdom Pirates members ===
Other members of the crew include:

- Scotch (スコッチ, Sukotchi): A cyborg who protects an unnamed winter island of Kaido. Scotch is voiced by Masaya Takatsuka in the original Japanese version and by Chad Cline in the Funimation dub.
- Hihimaru (ひひ丸, Hihimaru): A towering white baboon who worked as a guard for the Animal Kingdom Pirates. He defects after being tamed by Kurozumi Tama's Devil Fruit ability. Hihimaru's vocal effects are provided by Shinichi Yamada in the original Japanese version and by Bryan Massey in the Funimation dub.
- Scratchmen Apoo also worked as an informant for the crew.

== Red-Haired Pirates ==
Red-Haired Pirates
"Red-Haired" Shanks
Name	Role
Ben Beckmann	First Mate
Lucky Roux	Cook
Yasopp	Sniper
Limejuice	?
Bonk Punch	Musician
Building Snake	Navigator
Hongo	Doctor
Gab	?

The Red-Haired Pirates (赤髪海賊団, Akagami Kaizokudan) are led by "Red-Haired" Shanks. Members in the crew include:

=== Shanks ===
"Red-Haired" Shanks (赤髪のシャンクス, Akagami no Shankusu) is the captain of the Red Haired Pirate crew.^{[ch. 434]} The son of Celestial Dragon Figarland Garling and Magnolia, he was separated as an infant by a young Monkey D. Dragon from his twin brother Shamrock during the God Valley incident. He was found in a treasure chest looted by the Roger Pirates after the ordeal and the crew took him in. A young Shanks was an apprentice of the late Pirate King Gold Roger and served as an apprentice with fellow pirate Buggy the Clown. As an adult, Shanks formed his own crew of pirates called the Red-Haired Pirates, which were named after his distinctive crimson-colored hair.^{[ch. 19, 434, 506]} Some time after this, he returned to Marijoa to serve as a Devoted Blade, feigning hatred and loyalty for a period of time, during which he freed Fisher Tiger.^{[ch. 1167]} He is a mentor and hero to Luffy, having known Luffy since the latter was a young child. When Luffy was seven, Shanks saved his life from a sea serpent-type Sea King which cost Shanks his left arm and caused that Sea King to become frightened of him. When the Red Haired Pirates left Luffy's hometown of Foosha Village, Shanks gave the boy his straw hat that had in turn been passed down to him from Gold Roger and instructed Luffy to return the hat to him when he had become a great pirate. Shanks eventually becomes one of the Four Pirate Emperors.^{[ch. 1, 432]} Shanks currently has a bounty of 4,048,900,000.

Shanks is one of the most powerful characters in the series, defeating characters like Eustass Kid effortlessly with his master swordsmanship and rivaling Dracule Mihawk in their youths. Shanks is also a master of Conqueror's Haki, using it from a far distance against Greenbull and urging him to retreat from battle, he is also capable of using the advanced application for all types of Haki.

In the original Japanese series, his voice actor is Shūichi Ikeda. In the 4Kids English adaptation, he is voiced by Tom Souhrada. In the Funimation English adaptation, his voice actor is Brandon Potter. In the Netflix adaptation he is portrayed by Peter Gadiot.

=== Ben Beckman ===
Ben Beckman (ベン・ベックマン, Ben Bekkuman) is the first mate of the Red-Haired Pirates. He is often shown as a fairly calm and rational man, and carries a rifle as his weapon.^{[ch. 1]}

Ben Beckman is voiced by Kazuyuki Sogabe in Episode 4 of the original Japanese anime, Kenichi Ono in Grand Battle! Rush!, and by Aruno Tahara starting in Episode 151. In the 4Kids dub, he is voiced by Andrew Paull. In the Funimation dub, he is voiced by Shean Hennigan. In the Netflix adaptation, Ben Beckman is played by Laudo Liebenberg.

=== Lucky Roux ===
Lucky Roux (ラッキー・ルウ, Rakkī Ruu) is a large cook and combatant who is one of the Red-Haired Pirates' senior officers. He is often portrayed holding and eating a leg of meat.

Lucky Roux is voiced by Jin Domon in the original Japanese version. In the 4Kids dub, he is voiced by David Brimmer. In the Funimation dub, he is voiced by John Burgmeier. In the live-action series, Lucky Roux is played by Ntlanhla Morgan Kutu.

=== Yasopp ===
Yasopp (ヤソップ, Yasoppu) is a senior officer in and the main sniper of the Red-Haired Pirates. Yasopp is also the father of Usopp (and the husband of Usopp's late mother Banchina), who like his father before him becomes the sniper of a pirate crew when he joins the Straw Hats. Yasopp notably wears a blue bandana with his name on it.

Yasopp is voiced by Michitaka Kobayashi in the original Japanese version. In the 4Kids dub, he is voiced by Jason Griffith. In the Funimation dub, he is voiced by Scott Freeman in 2007-2014 and by Jeff Johnson in 2019–present. In the live-action series, Yasopp is played by Stevel Marc.

=== Senior Officers ===
- Limejuice (ライムジュース, Raimujūsu): One of the Red-Haired Pirates' senior officers. Limejuice is voiced by Kenichi Ono in the original Japanese version and by Jessie James Grelle in the Funimation dub.
- Bonk Punch (ボンクパンチ, Bonkupanchi): A musician who is one of the Red-Haired Pirates' senior officers. Bonk Punch is voiced by Kotaro Nakamura in the original Japanese version and by Josh Martin in the Funimation dub.
  - Monster (モンスター, Monsutā): A large intelligent monkey and a musician who is one of the Red-Haired Pirates' senior officers. He can often be seen riding around on Bonk Punch's shoulders. Monster's vocal effects are provided by Bin Shimada in the original Japanese version and by J. Paul Slavens in the Funimation dub.
- Building Snake (ビルディングスネーク, Birudingusunēku): A navigator who is one of the Red-Haired Pirates' senior officers. Building Snake is voiced by Issei Futamata in the original Japanese version and by Aaron Roberts in the Funimation dub.
- Hongo (本郷, Hongō): A doctor who is one of the Red-Haired Pirates' senior officers. Hongo is voiced by Hikaru Midorikawa in the original Japanese version and by Ricco Fajardo.
- Gab (ガブ, Gabu): One of the Red-Haired Pirates' senior officers who has sharp teeth. Gab is voiced by Jouji Nakata in the original Japanese version and by J. Paul Slavens in the Funimation dub.

== Blackbeard Pirates ==
Blackbeard Pirates
Marshall D. Teach (Dark-Dark)+(Quake-Quake)
No.	01	02	03	04	05
Name	"Champion" Jesus Burgess	Shiryu "of the Rain"	Van Augur "the Supersonic"	"Corrupt King" Avalo Pizarro	"Demon Sheriff" Lafitte
Devil Fruit	(Strong-Strong)	(Clear-Clear)	(Warp-Warp)	(Isle-Isle)	?
Joined	Original	Impel Down	Original	Impel Down	Original
No.	06	07	08	09	10
Name	"Crescent Moon Hunter" Catarina Devon	"Colossal Battleship" Sanjuan Wolf	"Heavy Drinker" Vasco Shot	"Death God" Doc Q	Kuzan
Devil Fruit	(Dog-Dog: Nine-tailed fox)	(Huge-Huge)	(Glug-Glug)	(Sick-Sick)	(Chilly-Chilly)
Joined	Impel Down	Impel Down	Impel Down	Original	ex-Navy

The Blackbeard Pirates (黒ひげ海賊団, Kurohige Kaizokudan) are a powerful pirate crew led by Marshall D. Teach. While originally having five members, the Blackbeard Pirates' membership was later expanded with a number of prisoners from Impel Down and Kuzan himself.

=== Marshall D. Teach ===
Marshall D. Teach (マーシャル・D・ティーチ, Māsharu Dī Tīchi), better known as Blackbeard (黒ひげ, Kurohige), is the 11 ft. captain, later commodore (admiral in the Japanese version), of the Blackbeard Pirates and the son of Rocks D. Xebec and Eris. As a member of the Whitebeard Pirates, he killed his crewmate Thatch to get hold of the Devil Fruit he has sought for several decades, the Dark-Dark Fruit (ヤミヤミの実, Yami Yami no Mi). It grants him the ability to create and control black holes, which are represented as flowing darkness, as well as the ability to disable the Devil Fruit powers of others, as long as he is touching the person.^{[ch. 440]}

For betraying Whitebeard's crew and the murder of his crewmate, he is pursued by Ace who eventually confronts him.^{[ch. 159, 440f.]} After defeating Ace and turning him in to the World Government, he is appointed Crocodile's replacement as one of the Seven Warlords of the Sea, a position he promptly abuses to expand his crew with prisoners from Impel Down and resigns once he is finished.

After killing Whitebeard with the help of his new crew, Blackbeard somehow adds his former captain's Devil Fruit ability to his own and manages to take Whitebeard's place as one of the Four Emperors.^{[ch. 486, 576f., 650]} In the Japanese anime television series, his voice actor is Akio Ōtsuka. In its Funimation English adaptation, his voice was supplied by Cole Brown until his death in November 2016, being replaced by Chris Rager.

The character is based on and named after the historical pirate Edward "Blackbeard" Teach.^{[ch. 474]}

=== Ten Titanic Captains ===
The Ten Titanic Captains (10人の巨漢船長, Jū-nin no Kyokan Senchō) are the top officers of the Blackbeard Pirates who are second only to Blackbeard by command and are listed in order of who commands each ship in order of appearance.

- Jesus Burgess (ジーザス・バージェス, Jīzasu Bājesu): The crew's helmsman who is very strong. He is the captain of the crew's first ship. Burgess has the epithet of "Champion". He was later revealed to have consumed a Devil Fruit called the Strong-Strong Fruit, which gives him super-strength. Burgess is voiced by Tetsu Inada in the original Japanese version and by Phil Parsons in the Funimation dub.
- Shiryu (シリュウ, Shiryū): He was Impel Down's former deposed chief jailer who becomes the captain of the crew's second ship and later gained Absalom's invisibility.^{[ch. 576]} He has the epithet of "Of the Rain". Shiryu is voiced by Takayuki Sugō in the original Japanese version and by Matt Thurston in the Funimation dub.
- Van Augur (ヴァン・オーガー, Van Ōgā): The crew's marksman and captain of the crew's third ship. He has the epithet of "The Supersonic". He was later revealed to have consumed a Devil Fruit called the Warp-Warp Fruit, which enables him to teleport himself and other people. Augur is voiced by Masaya Takatsuka in the original Japanese version and by Barry Yandell in the Funimation dub.
- Avalo Pizarro (アバロ・ピサロ, Abaro Pisaro): A 16 ft. man who was the tyrannical former king of a kingdom in the North Blue who Blackbeard sprung from Impel Down. He is the captain of the crew's 4th ship. Pizarro has the epithet of "Corrupt King". He later gained the powers of the Isle-Isle Fruit which allows him to fuse with the environment of the island they are on.^{[ch. 1080]} Pizarro is voiced by Kazunari Tanaka in earlier episodes and Masaya Takatsuka in later episodes of the original Japanese version. In the Funimation dub, he is voiced by Greg Silva.
- Lafitte (ラフィット, Rafitto): An exiled police officer from the West Blue, who serves as the crew's navigator and chief of staff. He is the captain of the crew's 5th ship. Laffitte has the epithet of "Demon Sheriff". He is later implied to have consumed a Devil Fruit that enables him to sprout bird-like wings. Lafitte is voice by Taiki Matsuno in the original Japanese version and by Christopher Bevins in the Funimation dub. The character is named after the real life pirate Jean Lafitte.
- Catarina Devon (カタリーナ・デボン, Katarīna Debon): An 11 ft. woman and former inmate of Impel Down who can turn into a Kyubi no Kitsune or a Kyubi no Kitsune-human hybrid with the powers of the Dog-Dog Fruit: Model Nine Tailed Fox (イヌイヌの実 モデル九尾の狐, Inu Inu no Mi, Model: Kyubi no Kitsune), which also grants her the ability to transform into other people. She is the captain of the crew's 6th ship. Devon has the epithet of "Crescent Moon Hunter". Devon is voiced by Kimiko Saitō in the original Japanese version and by Natalie Hoover in the Funimation dub.
- Sanjuan Wolf (サンファン・ウルフ, Sanfan Urufu): The biggest giant whose 519 ft. size comes from the ability of the Huge-Huge Fruit.^{[ch. 1080]} After Blackbeard sprung him from Impel Down, He is the captain of the crew's 7th ship, and has the epithet of "Colossal Battleship" and was big enough to stand in certain parts of the ocean which would get him exhausted over time. Wolf is voiced by Kenichi Ono in the original Japanese version and by Jason Bunch in the Funimation dub.
- Vasco Shot (バスコ・ショット, Basuko Shotto): An 18 ft. legendary criminal with a love of alcoholic beverages. He is the captain of the crew's 8th ship. Shot has the epithet of "Heavy Drinker". He later gained the powers of the Glug-Glug Fruit, though its powers are currently unclear aside from making use of the alcohol's flammable properties.^{[ch. 1080]} Shot is voiced by Naoki Tatsuta in the original Japanese version and by Clint Ford in the Funimation dub.
- Doc Q (ドクQ, Doku Kyū):^{[ch. 234]} The crew's sickly physician. He is the captain of the crew's 9th ship, and has the epithet of "Death God" or "Grim Reaper". Doc Q is later revealed to have consumed a Devil Fruit called the Sick-Sick Fruit, which enables him to inflict diseases on anyone. Doc Q is voiced by Naoya Uchida in the original Japanese version and by Kenny Green in the Funimation dub.
  - Stronger (ストロンガー, Sutorongā): Doc Q's equally sickly horse.^{[ch. 223]} He is later revealed to have consumed a Devil Fruit called the Horse-Horse Fruit: Model Pegasus, which enables him to transform into a Pegasus.
- Kuzan (クザン): Formerly known as Admiral Aokiji (青雉; lit. "Blue Pheasant"), is a seemingly lazy but morally upright former naval officer with the ability of the Logia-type Chilly-Chilly Fruit (ヒエヒエの実, Hie Hie no Mi), which allows him to generate, control, or become ice.^{[ch. 319f., 393]} He encountered the Straw Hat Crew for first time on Long Ring Long Land, where he froze Nico Robin, and although Luffy tried to fight him, he too ended up being frozen.^{[ch. 319, 320, 321]} In the past, he was present at the Buster Call on Ohara, where he helped Robin escape.^{[ch. 397]} After the Marineford war, Sengoku advocated Aokiji to succeed him as fleet admiral.^{[ch. 594]} Aokiji dueled with Akainu for the position, but lost. Not wanting to serve under Akainu, he left the Navy thanks to his disillusionment with the World Government's Absolute Justice and joins the Blackbeard Pirates soon after for unknown reasons^{[ch. 650]} and becomes the captain of the crew's 10th ship.^{[ch. 1081]} Aokiji's appearance is modeled after Yūsaku Matsuda.^{[ch. 558]} He is voiced by Takehito Koyasu in the original Japanese version. In the Funimation English adaptation, his voice is initially supplied by Bob Carter and was later voiced by Jason Douglas.

=== Other Blackbeard Pirates members ===
- Kikipatsu (キキパツ, Kikipatsu): A man with a blonde beard who is a member of the Blackbeard Pirates.
- Maki (マキ, Maki): A female member of the Blackbeard Pirates with shoulder-length purple hair.
- Tori (トリ, Tori): A female member of the Blackbeard Pirates with long blonde hair.
- Peachbeard (桃ひげ, Momohige): The captain of the Peachbeard Pirates who aligns his crew with the Blackbeard Pirates.^{[ch. 904]} Peachbeard is voiced by Kotaro Nakamura in the original Japanese version and by Kenny James in the Funimation dub.

== Cross Guild ==
Key members of Buggy's Band of Pirates (East Blue)
Name	Rank	Devil Fruit	Anime voice actor(s)		Live actor(s)
Name	Rank	Devil Fruit	JP	US	Live actor(s)
Buggy	Captain	Chop-Chop	Shigeru Chiba	David Wills Mike McFarland	Jeff Ward
Mohji	First Mate	—N/a	Shigenori Sōya	Tom Souhrada Chuck Huber	?
Cabaji	Chief of Staff	—N/a	Endō Moriya	J. Ward Regan Greg Ayres	Sven Ruygrok
Richie	Mohji's Pet	—N/a	Tetsu Inada	Mike McFarlane	—N/a

Buggy's Band of Pirates (バギー海賊団, Bagī Kaizokudan) is a circus-themed group of pirates led by Buggy the Clown, one of the Seven Warlords of the Sea after the 2-year timeskip. Following Buggy's escape from Impel Down, the Buggy Pirates are joined by some of his fellow escapees.^{[ch. 593]}

Cross Guild
"Genius Jester" Buggy (Chop-Chop)
[unofficial leaders]	"Sir" Crocodile			Dracule "Hawk-Eye" Mihawk		
[unofficial leaders]	(Sand-Sand)			—N/a		
Other key members	Daz Bonez "Mr. 1"	Galdino "Mr. 3"	Alvida	Mohji	Richie	Cabaji
Other key members	(Dice-Dice)	(Wax-Wax)	(Slip-Slip)	Animal tamer	Lion	Acrobat
Originally from	Baroque Works		Alvida	Buggy's Band		

With the collapse of the Warlords system, all former Warlords become wanted once again, but when the Marine attack on Buggy commences, by pure coincidence, Sir Crocodile and Dracule Mihawk arrive, making the Marines and Buggy's crew think the two other ex-Warlords are in Buggy's command. Crocodile and Mihawk ultimately agree to let Buggy take the public face of their new organization, Cross Guild (クロス・ギルド, Kurosu Girudo), as its president and figurehead while the other two are the actual heads. Cross Guild has quickly become so powerful, they now offer their own bounties against the Marines.^{[ch. 1056, 1058]}

=== Buggy ===
Buggy (バギー, Bagī) is a clown-themed pirate with a preference for fighting with knives, a love of cannons, and a prominent red nose. While a junior member of the Roger Pirates, he gets hold of a devil fruit and a treasure map, intending to sell the fruit and search for the treasure, but Shanks accidentally causes him to swallow the fruit and drop the map into the sea, earning Buggy's resentment.^{[ch. 19, 434]} Having consumed the Paramecia-type Chop-Chop Fruit (バラバラの実, Bara Bara no Mi), Buggy can separate his body into levitating parts and control them independently as long as they remain close, and at least one of his feet is on the ground. This ability also makes him immune to cutting attacks which will only separate him into parts.^{[ch. 526f.]} Following the Roger Pirates' dissolution, Buggy becomes captain of the Buggy Pirates and achieves limited notoriety as "Buggy the Clown" (道化のバギー, Dōke no Bagī).^{[ch. 9]} Eventually his involvement in the first mass breakout of Impel Down, and the Paramount War, earns him a sizable following of escapees and worldwide infamy as "The Genius Jester" (千両道化, Senryō Dōke), and a seat among the Seven Warlords of the Sea.^{[ch. 549, 700]}

In the anime series, Buggy the Clown's voice actor is Shigeru Chiba. In the 4Kids dub, he is voiced by David Wills. In the Funimation dub, his voice was supplied by Mike McFarland until his passing in 2026. In the live-action series, he is portrayed by Jeff Ward. Unlike the anime and manga, Buggy's head upon his defeat was briefly found by the Arlong Pirates. He would later meet Alvida in a bar.

Oda said that Buggy is his favorite antagonist, because of all of them he is the easiest to draw. Buggy has received much praise and criticism. Carl Kimlinger of Anime News Network said that Luffy's fight with Buggy "sets the series' precedent for battles that are simultaneously tense and hilarious". Jacob Hope Chapman of the same site said that seeing Buggy during the Jaya Arc was "entertaining". Bryce Coulter of Mania Entertainment praised Chibi Buggy's Adventure as one of the best arcs, and Buggy for his "slap-stick humour" and "Voltron-esque combining sequence". He was "disappointed" that Buggy, Smoker, and the Strawhats did not have a conflict at sea. On Luffy and Buggy's alliance in Impel Down, Chris Beveridge said, "the two do make an amusing pairing as their flight through the first level goes on". He went on to say, "he never really cared for Buggy", but the Impel Down arc turned him into an "engaging character". He said that he believes that Buggy is being set up as a regular character because he was "afraid he might lose him". Pedro Cortes of Japanator said, "Buggy is always good for a laugh, so his bit was a welcomed respite from the oppressive marines beating down Luffy and the Whitebeard pirates."

=== Crocodile ===
"Sir" Crocodile (サー・クロコダイル, Sā Kurokodairu) is a pirate with the ability of the Logia-type Sand-Sand Fruit (スナスナの実, Suna Suna no Mi), allowing him to generate and control sand,^{[ch. 170]} absorb moisture with his right hand,^{[ch. 201]} and, as long as he is not wet, turn his body into sand.^{[ch. 199]} He wears a large golden alloy hook in place of a left hand,^{[ch. 160]} which contains a potent poison and a dagger underneath.^{[ch. 204]} Initially a member of the Seven Warlords of the Sea,^{[ch. 113]} his title is revoked by Tashigi when it is discovered that he, under the code name of "Mr. 0" (ミスター・ゼロ, Misutā Zero),^{[ch. 127, 211]} headed the criminal organization known as Baroque Works as president and attempted a coup of Alabasta. After he was defeated by Luffy, he was subsequently arrested and sent to Impel Down.^{[ch. 211]}

Sometime after the mass-prison break at Impel Down, Crocodile founds the Cross Guild along with Mihawk and becomes one of its chief officers.^{[ch. 1058]}

In the original Japanese series, he is voiced by Ryūzaburō Ōtomo. In the 4Kids adaptation, Crocodile is voiced by David Brimmer. In the Funimation English adaptation, his voice is supplied by John Swasey. In the live-action series, Crocodile is portrayed by Joe Manganiello.

=== Dracule Mihawk ===
Dracule Mihawk (ジュラキュール・ミホーク, Jurakyūru Mihōku), also called "Hawk-Eye" Mihawk (鷹の目のミホーク, Taka no Me no Mihōku), is a pirate who is one of the former Seven Warlords of the Sea, and is known under the title of "The Strongest Swordsman in the World".^{[ch. 50, 52, 69]} His primary weapon is a Grosse Messer that Mihawk calls Yoru. He also often carries around a dagger that he conceals in a crucifix pendant. His personal ship is called the Hitsugibune, an all-black boat that resembles a coffin and has candles lit on the edges that burn with green fire.^{[ch. 50, ?]} The Hitsugibune's mast is notable for the fact that it is shaped like Yoru.

Physically, Mihawk is a tall man with pale skin and black hair (generally has distinctive side burns and a beard), a muscular build, and a generally deadpan expression. His most distinctive physical trait are his yellow-and-black eyes, which are the source of his nickname "Hawk-Eye" Mihawk. Mihawk commonly wears a white shirt and a black coat and hat with red as a secondary coloring.

Mihawk is a loner and solitary in his nature. He has a deadpan and reserved demeanor that fully matches his general expression. Unlike many pirates in the world of One Piece, Mihawk does not have a crew and usually travels and lives alone. Mihawk is very self-confident in his abilities and his status as the world's greatest swordsman, but he is always eager to test his abilities against new opponents and has an equal level of appreciation for the skills and work ethics of others for his own and is not arrogant. For example, Mihawk is one of the few people to actually respect Luffy's abilities and ambitions and sees him as a capable and brave warrior instead of a foolhardy boy/young man many of Luffy's enemies mistakenly believe him to be.

Roronoa Zoro, due to his dream of becoming the world's greatest swordsman, aims to one day defeat Mihawk in a duel. Zoro first challenged Mihawk to a duel to the death when the latter was hunting the pirate captain Don Krieg at Baratie and lost, though Mihawk deemed that despite not being a worthy opponent for him at that point, Zoro would be able to grow into a worthy competitor given the time and allowed him to live. Mihawk even trained Zoro during the series' two year time jump due to a combination of reasons: he was humored by the concept of training a man who sought to one day kill him and take his title and he respected Zoro's dedication to his craft and his skill and for putting aside his pride so that he could help Luffy and his friends by continuing to hone his skills as a combatant. After the Warlord system is abolished, Mihawk creates the Cross Guild with Crocodile.^{[ch. 1058]}

Takeshi Aono provided his voice in the anime until 2010, after which he was replaced by Hirohiko Kakegawa. In the 4Kids English adaptation, he is voiced by Wayne Grayson. In the Funimation English adaptation, his voice is supplied by John Gremillion. In the live-action adaptation, he is portrayed by Steven John Ward as an adult and by Theo Le Ray in a flashback sequence.

=== Alvida ===
Alvida (アルビダ, Arubida) is introduced as the fat captain of the Alvida Pirates until she was defeated by Luffy. When she later resurfaced and sided with Buggy following the dissolving of her pirate crew, Alvida gained the powers of the Slip-Slip Fruit which makes her slippery as she also claimed that all her body fat slipped off her.^{[ch. 50, 98]}

Alvida is voiced by Yōko Matsuoka in the original Japanese version except in Grand Battle! Rush, where she was voiced by Yuko Tachibana. In the 4Kids and Funimation dubs, she is voiced by Kathleen Delaney and Laurie Steele respectively. In the live-action series, Alvida is portrayed by Ilia Isorelýs Paulino.

The character is named after the legendary pirate Awilda.

=== Daz Bonez ===
Daz Bonez (ダズ・ボーネス, Dazu Bōnesu), code named "Mr. 1" (ミスター・ワン, Misutā Wan), was the highest-ranking male Officer Agent of Baroque Works whose body possesses the qualities of bladed steel thanks to the powers of the Dice-Dice Fruit, and his partner was Ms. Doublefinger.^{[ch. 190]} Following the organization's dissolution and arrest, he was sent to Level 5 of Impel Down.^{[ch. 533]} Daz Bonez later escapes and joins up with Buggy's crew.

Daz Bonez is voiced by Tetsu Inada in the original Japanese version and by Scottie Ray and Brett Weaver in the 4Kids and Funimation dub respectively. In the live-action series, he is portrayed by Awdo Awdo.

=== Galdino ===
Galdino (ギャルディーノ, Gyarudīno), better known under his Baroque Works code name "Mr. 3" (ミスター・スリー, Misutā Surī) and an Officer Agent of the organization, is a sculptor with the ability of the Paramecia-type Wax-Wax Fruit (ドルドルの実, Doru Doru no Mi), which allows him to generate and control candle wax.^{[ch. 120, 532]} Following the dissolution of the organization, he was captured and taken to Impel Down, where he joined Buggy to escape, then participated in the Marineford War, and subsequently joined Buggy's crew.

He is voiced by Nobuyuki Hiyama in the original Japanese version of the franchise. In the English versions of the series, he is voiced by Tom Souhrada in the 4Kids dub and by Duncan Brannan in the Funimation dub. In the live-action series, he is portrayed by David Dastmalchian.

=== Mohji ===
Mohji (モージ, Mōji) is Buggy's initial first mate and is a beast tamer. He confronts Luffy in Orange Town along with his pet lion Richie, being defeated. Mohji would later continue to follow Buggy even when the Cross Guild is formed.

Mohji is voiced by Shigenori Sōya in the original Japanese version and by Tom Souhrada and Chuck Huber in the 4Kids and Funimation dubs respectively.

==== Richie ====
Richie (リッチー, Richī) is Mohji's pet lion.^{[ch. 12]} He is a big-sized lion with orange fur and a red mane (in Toei Animation's anime, his fur is green and his mane purple). After Buggy's defeat in Orange Town, Richie briefly becomes captain of the Buggy Pirates, turning the group into the Richie Pirates temporarily. Richie continued to join his master in following Buggy even when the Cross Guard is formed.

Richie is voiced by Tetsu Inada in the original Japanese version and by Mike McFarland in the Funimation dub.

=== Cabaji ===
Cabaji (カバジ, Kabaji) is an acrobat, and Buggy's chief of staff.^{[ch. 15]} He confronts Zoro in Orange Town, being defeated. Cabaji would later continue to follow Buggy even when the Cross Guild is formed.

Cabaji is voiced by Endō Moriya in the original Japanese version and by J. Ward Regan and Greg Ayres in the 4Kids and Funimation dubs respectively.

In the live-action series, Cabaji is portrayed by Sven Ruygrok. His history in the live-action series was that he had a brother that was killed by Zoro and tried to have his revenge on him only to be defeated by Zoro and Nami.

=== Other Cross Guild members ===
- The Tightrope Walking Funan Bros (綱渡りフナンボローズ, Tsunawatari Funan Borōzu): Three unnamed brothers and members of the Buggy Pirates who were deceived by Nami and robbed by her on the high seas. The Tightrope Walking Funan Bros are voiced by Tetsu Inada, Osamu Ryutani, and Naoki Imamura in the original Japanese version. In the Funimation dub, they are voiced by Sonny Strait, Justin Cook, and J. Michael Tatum.
- The Superhuman Domingos (怪力ドミンゴス, Kairiki Domingosu): Three strongmen who are members of the Buggy Pirates.
- The Acrobatic Fuwas (軽業フワーズ, Karuwaza Fuwāzu): A group of four acrobats who are members of the Buggy Pirates.
- Kinoko (キノコ, Kinoko): A large, corpulent man and former prisoner of Impel Down's Level 5 who sided with Buggy the Clown during the mass prison break.

== See also ==
- List of One Piece characters
- List of One Piece pirates
- World Government (One Piece)
