= Monkey D. Luffy =

Fictional character from One Piece

- One Piece character
- First appearance: One Piece chapter 1: "Romance Dawn" (Weekly Shōnen Jump No. 34, 1997)
- Created by: Eiichiro Oda
- Portrayed by: Iñaki Godoy
- Voiced by: See Portrayals
- Birthday: May 5

In-universe information
- Aliases: Straw Hat (麦わら, Mugiwara)
- Occupation: Pirate (Captain)
- Relatives: Monkey D. Dragon (father); Monkey D. Garp (grandfather); Portgas D. Ace (sworn brother); Sabo (sworn brother)
- Affiliations: Straw Hat Crew (captain); Straw Hat Grand Fleet (de facto commodore); Worst Generation (member); Four Emperors (member); Ninja-Pirate-Mink-Samurai Alliance (co-leader, disbanded)
- Age: 7 (debut); 17 (pre-time skip); 19 (post-time skip)
- Devil Fruit: Human-Human Fruit, Model: Nika (ヒトヒトの実 モデル"ニカ", Hito Hito no Mi, Moderu: Nika) (better known as Gum-Gum Fruit (ゴムゴムの実, Gomu Gomu no Mi)) (Note: Popularly known as the Gum-Gum Fruit (ゴムゴムの実, Gomu Gomu no Mi). It is a Mythical Zoan-type Devil Fruit that allows the user to transform into the legendary "Sun God Nika" or "Warrior of Liberation", and can gain his attributes, namely a body with the properties of rubber.)
- Bounties: 3,000,000,000 (current, seventh); 30,000,000 (first); 100,000,000 (second); 300,000,000 (third); 400,000,000 (fourth); 500,000,000 (fifth); 1,500,000,000 (sixth)

Monkey D. Luffy (/ˈluːfi/ LOO-fee) (Japanese: モンキー・D・ルフィ, Hepburn: Monkī Dī Rufi; [ɾɯꜜɸiː]), also known as "Straw Hat" Luffy, (Note: 麦わらのルフィ, Mugiwara no Rufi) is a fictional character and the main protagonist of the manga series One Piece, created by Eiichiro Oda, as well as the central character of the franchise generated from it. Luffy made his debut as a young boy who acquires the physical properties of rubber after accidentally eating one of the Devil Fruits.

Monkey D. Luffy is the captain of the Straw Hat Crew, and has dreamt of becoming a pirate since childhood inspired by his idol and mentor Red-Haired Shanks. At the age of 17, Luffy sets sail from the East Blue Sea to the Grand Line in search of the legendary treasure One Piece, to succeed Gold Roger as the King of the Pirates. He fights multiple antagonists, and aids and befriends the inhabitants of several islands on his journey. Usually cheerful and carefree, he becomes serious and even aggressive when he fights or if one of his friends is harmed. Luffy has developed a range of attacks around the rubber properties of his body. In his signature attack, the Gum-Gum Pistol, he slingshots punches at opponents from a distance. Luffy also grows stronger over the course of the story by transforming his body through different "Gears"; this is reflected in his bounty, which is used to measure the threat he poses to the World Government, which forbids piracy. Luffy clashes with the three kinds of great powers in One Piece: the World Government's Marines and its allied privateers known as the Seven Warlords of the Sea, and the most influential pirate captains known as the Four Emperors.

Luffy born on May 5, is the son of Revolutionary Army Leader Monkey D. Dragon, the grandson of Marine Vice-Admiral Monkey D. Garp, and sworn brother to Portgas D. Ace and Sabo. During the course of Luffy's journey, he makes many friends and recruits to the Straw Hats the swordsman Roronoa Zoro, navigator Nami, sniper Usopp, chef Sanji, doctor Tony Tony Chopper, archaeologist Nico Robin, shipwright Franky, musician Brook, and helmsman Jimbei. Luffy's rise alters the balance of power between great powers on the Blue Planet. After two years, Luffy puts Fish-Man Island and the Wano Country under his protection, gains a grand fleet of over 5,600 pirates and becomes one of the Four Emperors of the Sea. Luffy is currently one of the three most powerful pirate captains alongside his mentor Shanks and his rival Blackbeard.

Luffy appears in most episodes, films, television specials, and OVAs of the manga's anime adaptations, as well as in several of the franchise's video games. Due to the series' international popularity, Luffy is one of the world's most recognizable manga and anime characters. Beyond the One Piece franchise, the character also appears in various manga, anime series, and collaborative video games. His critical reception has been largely positive, with him placing first in every popularity poll.

== Creation and conception ==
=== Development ===
When Eiichiro Oda created Luffy, he initially strove for a "manliness" similar to that of Akira Toriyama's Dragon Ball series. Oda said that he named his main character "Luffy" because he felt that the name suited him. When he later learned about the sailing term, "luffing", he was delighted by the coincidence. In his prototype one-shot, "Romance Dawn", Oda refined the artistic style and story elements before publishing the final product a year later as the first chapter of One Piece. In the second version of "Romance Dawn", Luffy resembled his design at the beginning of the series.

After the one-shot of One Piece was made, Oda contacted his former mentor, Nobuhiro Watsuki, whom he assisted in making the manga Rurouni Kenshin. Watsuki was pleased with Luffy's characterization and advised Oda to briefly change him for the main series to make it look like Luffy is always acting of his own free will. To please his readers, Oda added rubberization to Luffy for comic effect and tries to make the character straightforward. In retrospect, Watsuki felt characters like Luffy reflect a trend of heroes who do not kill their enemies similar to his character Himura Kenshin.

=== Portrayals ===
In the original Japanese version of the One Piece anime series and later spin-offs of the franchise, Luffy is voiced by Mayumi Tanaka. Tanaka said jokingly that she regrets providing Luffy's voice because she is a mother in real life and Luffy is much younger. Asked about her voicing, Tanaka said that she "strives for reality" in scenes where Luffy speaks when he is eating or touching his nose. In the OVA Defeat the Pirate Ganzack!, Luffy was voiced by Urara Takano.

In Odex's English-dubbed VCDs produced by Voiceovers Unlimited, Luffy is voiced by Chuck Powers, the director of said English version. In this edition his name is mispronounced as "Luh-fee" (/ˈlʌfiː/). The character was voiced by Erica Schroeder in 4Kids Entertainment's English-language dubs of the franchise between 2004 and 2006. Following Funimation/Crunchyroll's acquisition of the franchise license in 2007, Colleen Clinkenbeard became the voice of Luffy in all English-language releases.

In the live action adaptation of One Piece, Luffy is portrayed by Mexican actor Iñaki Godoy, while Colton Osorio plays Luffy as a child. Godoy and Tanaka reprised their roles as Luffy in the Latin American Spanish and Japanese dubs of the adaptation respectively.

== Description ==
Luffy is usually recognizable by his red-ribboned straw hat, a gift from his idol and mentor "Red-Haired" Shanks. In his early childhood, he wears a white shirt and blue shorts. The character has a scar under his left eye from stabbing himself to demonstrate his courage to Shanks and his crew. He later wears a red vest, denim shorts, and sandals, before replacing his vest with a red, unbuttoned sea captain's coat (revealing the X-shaped scar on his chest he received from Akainu), and a yellow sash tied around his waist. In an interview, Eiichiro Oda said Luffy's real-world nationality analogue is Brazilian.

=== Personality ===
Luffy is portrayed as a carefree, fun-loving, happy-go-lucky character with great ambition and a huge appetite, often thinking with his stomach and comically gorging himself. Optimistic and generally good-hearted, he is not as dimwitted as many believe him to be, and he often demonstrates more understanding than the other characters expect. Knowing the danger ahead, Luffy is willing to risk his life to become King of the Pirates and protect his crew. A capable and reliable captain, he never puts his crew or himself at risk out of incompetence. During the Loguetown story arc, Smoker (a navy captain at the time) says that Luffy "enjoys playing stupid"; Luffy responds with a mysterious smile. Luffy has a low conventional IQ (estimated around 85) but has an incredibly high "battle IQ" and EQ.

He enlists Chopper and Brook for his crew not just for their personality or appearance, but also because of his instinctive ability to read people. Luffy needs key jobs filled by his crew (cook, navigator, medic, musician, and shipwright, filled by Sanji, Nami, Chopper, Brook, and Franky, respectively). At the beginning of the series, he said that he wanted at least ten crew members with abilities he felt necessary for his goal. Despite his carefree personality, each crew member respects him in their own way. Luffy is rarely concerned about the consequences of his actions, doing what he feels is right at the moment, even if it leads to retaliation by a powerful force. He is an extremely loyal captain, who has demonstrated throughout the series that he is willing to risk his life for the well-being of his crew.

=== Abilities ===
==== Devil Fruit ====
Luffy's rubber attributes are a result of him eating a devil fruit called the Human-Human fruit model Nika (the Sun God). This devil fruit was thought to be called the Gum-Gum fruit due to the world government's propaganda. Granting him a rubber-like body, his powers make him immune to electric attacks and most blunt forces, but he is susceptible to attacks made with sharp objects or weapons (e.g. sword, spear). His rubber devil fruit powers grant him the ability to stretch his body at will.

He uses his elasticity to accelerate part or all of his body to deliver punches, kicks, head butts, and many other varied attacks as seen throughout the series. Like others who have eaten a Devil Fruit, Luffy cannot swim; when he is submerged in water or makes contact with Sea-Prism Stone, he loses his strength and cannot move on his own. In addition to his Devil Fruit powers, he has immense strength, durability, speed, reflexes, agility, endurance, and stamina.

Luffy's signature attack is the Gum-Gum Pistol (ゴムゴムの銃(ピストル), Gomu Gomu no Pisutoru), a punch which he learned during years of training. After observing CP9's Shave (剃, Soru) technique, Luffy develops a technique called Gear 2 (ギア2(セカンド), Gia Sekando), which increases his strength and speed for a short time by using his body as a pump to move blood at a high speed around his body. However, this puts strain on his body due to very high energy consumption and can shorten his lifespan if used too long. Gear 3 (ギア3(サード), Gia Sādo), another technique, involves Luffy blowing air into his thumb bone to inflate it and moving the air around his other bones to inflate other body parts. This allows for high-damage attacks but makes him shrink afterward. Luffy can use both techniques simultaneously; after the two-year time skip, he gains better control of these techniques and is no longer affected by their drawbacks.

Luffy develops another technique, Gear 4 (ギア4(フォース), Gia Fōsu) (similar to Gear 3), inflating his muscles with air to increase the size of his body (except for his legs) and coating his limbs with Armament Haki. In contrast to Gears 2 and 3, Luffy uses compression rather than extension for his attacks, compressing and releasing his limbs to dish out devastating blows. The force released from his kicks is so great that he can use them to fly in a similar fashion to CP9's Moon Walk (月歩, Geppō) technique.

Later, it is revealed that the Gum-Gum Fruit's real name is the "Human-Human Fruit, Model: Nika", a Mythical Zoan-type Devil Fruit whose "awakening" grants Luffy's rubber-like body increased strength and freedom, including turning the environment and other living beings into rubber, which is limited only by the user's imagination. It is for this reason that the user is said to become a trickster sun god known as the "embodiment of freedom", able to bring joy to the people around them and making it "the most ridiculous power in the world". In Gear 5 (ギア5(フィフス), Gia Fifusu), Luffy's hair and clothes also turn white. The World Government renamed it to erase the fruit's original name from history and reclassified it as a Paramecia in order to conceal its true nature. The fruit was originally a treasure sought by the World Government for over 800 years until it was stolen by Red-haired Shanks. According to the Five Elders, the fruit had not been awakened for centuries prior to Luffy's having done so.

==== Haki ====
Luffy has the ability to use Haki (覇気; ambition). This ability has three types: Armament Haki (武装色の覇気, Busōshoku no Haki), an armor-like force, which can amplify defense and the force of attacks and negate a Devil Fruit user's defense, allowing physical contact and damage; Observation Haki (見聞色の覇気, Kenbunshoku no Haki), a sixth sense, which can read a person's moves and detect their presence; and Conqueror's Haki (覇王色の覇気, Haōshoku no Haki), which can render weak-willed people or animals near him unconscious.

Luffy learns all those types of Haki and uses them with his improved attacks. As a result of his encounter with Magellan, the prison warden of Impel Down who consumed the Poison-Poison fruit, he has also developed an immunity to poison (although it is shown that a strong poison may affect him, albeit very slowly). During his fight against Charlotte Katakuri, Luffy gains an advanced form of Observation Haki (Called Future Sight) to see several seconds into the future.

During his time at Udon prison in Wano, Luffy gains two new advanced forms of Armament Haki. The first one is called Emission to shoot a short blast of Haki from a distance while the second one is called Internal Destruction which can also go inside his target's body or objects and destroy it from within. During his fight with Kaidou at the top of Onigashima, Luffy unlocks an advanced form of Conqueror's Haki. It is the ability to coat his entire body with it, similar to Armament Haki, which could further enhance his attacks.

=== Bounty ===
Throughout One Piece, the bounty placed on Luffy continually increases as he faces off against increasingly powerful pirates, representing his notoriety in the One Piece world. After defeating Buggy, Don Krieg, and Arlong of East Blue, early on in the series, Luffy's initial bounty is set to 30,000,000 Berries. By the major timeskip in One Piece, this number had increased to 400,000,000 Berries after defeating some of the Seven Warlords of the Sea, rampaging at Enies Lobby, and retaking Nico Robin. After defeating the pirate emperor Kaido, Luffy's total bounty has increased to 3 billion Berries after becoming one of the "Four Emperors in the New World."

== Appearances ==
=== One Piece ===
Luffy first appears as a young boy in Windmill Village located in the Goa kingdom, where he befriends the pirate "Red-Haired" Shanks and intends to become one himself. He accidentally eats a Devil Fruit called the Gum-Gum Fruit and acquires rubber-like properties at the cost of being unable to swim. Shanks later saves Luffy from being devoured by a Sea King, a monstrous sea beast, at the cost of his left arm. Before departing Windmill Village, Shanks gives Luffy his treasured straw hat, on the condition that he becomes a great pirate someday and returns it to him.

Ten years later, Luffy leaves the village in a small fishing boat in search of the legendary treasure 'One Piece' to become the next King of the Pirates. He meets swordsman Roronoa Zoro, ocean navigator and thief Nami, cowardly marksman and liar Usopp, and chivalrous chef Sanji and invites them to join his crew, while procuring a ship named the Going Merry Luffy also encounters and defeats the infamous East Blue pirates Buggy the Clown, Don Krieg and the Fish-Man Arlong, gaining his first bounty and his infamy as "Straw Hat" Luffy from the Marines.

The crew enters the dangerous Grand Line on their ship, the Going Merry. Luffy encounters and offers to return Princess Nefertari Vivi of Alabasta to her homeland to stop a rebellion incited by Seven Warlords of the Sea member and Baroque Works crime syndicate leader Sir Crocodile. On the way, Nami contracts a severe illness and the crew goes to find a doctor on the winter Drum Island. After Nami is healed, the reindeer doctor Tony Tony Chopper joins the Straw Hat crew. Upon arriving in Alabasta, Luffy briefly reunites with his older brother Portgas D. Ace, a commander in the Whitebeard Pirates, who is hunting the traitor Blackbeard. Luffy defeats Crocodile, though the World Government censors his involvement. Luffy then accepts Crocodile's mysterious partner Nico Robin as the archeologist of his crew.

Robin's knowledge alerts the crew to the existence of Sky Islands. Luffy meets Blackbeard — but does not find out his name. Blackbeard encourages Luffy to find the Sky Island, saying that the dreams of pirates never die. The crew successfully reaches Skypiea, where the crew is drawn into a four-hundred-year war over land. Luffy ends the war by defeating the god Eneru.

Upon landing back in the Blue Seas, the Going Merry is heavily damaged and Luffy seeks a shipwright to repair it. He meets Marine Admiral Aokiji, who easily defeats him but allows the crew to continue their voyage. The crew arrives at Water 7, the island with the best shipwrights in the world, where Robin mysteriously leaves with members of the World Government intelligence agency Cipher Pol No. 9. Luffy's crew aligns with the cyborg shipwright Franky, initially an enemy, and storm the Government's courthouse Enies Lobby to retrieve her.

Robin reveals her past as a fugitive of the Government, but the Straw Hats declare war on the Government to affirm their commitment to her. After defeating CP9 and escaping Enies Lobby, Luffy encounters his grandfather, Vice Admiral Monkey D. Garp. Garp tells him Shanks and Whitebeard are two of the Four Emperors, the most powerful pirates in the second half of the Grand Line. Luffy is surprised to learn from Garp that the leader of the Revolutionary Army which seeks to topple the World Government is Monkey D. Dragon, Luffy's father.

On the way to Fish-Man Island in their new ship, the Thousand Sunny, which Franky built, Luffy encounters the skeletal musician Brook. Brook accepts Luffy's offer to join the crew before declining since his shadow has been stolen. To return Brook's shadow, they defeat Warlord Gecko Moria and Brook becomes Luffy's long-sought musician of the crew.

To enter Fish-Man Island, the crew takes a detour to the Sabaody Archipelago. By this time, Luffy has gained worldwide fame among the notorious rookie pirates with bounties of over 100 million Berries; these rookies are known as Supernovas and include Zoro, Trafalgar Law, Eustass Kidd, and Capone "Gang" Bege. The Roger Pirates' retired First Mate, Silvers Rayleigh, takes a liking to Luffy and agrees to coat the Thousand Sunny to sail into the ocean depths. The plan is derailed after Luffy attacks a World Noble for harming a friend, and the rest of the Straw Hat Crew are easily defeated by Admiral Kizaru and scattered to different parts of the world by Warlord Bartholomew Kuma.

Stranded on Amazon Lily, an island ruled by the warlord Boa Hancock, Luffy impresses her with his bravery and selflessness. While on Amazon Lily, Luffy learns that his brother Ace was defeated by Blackbeard and handed over to the World Government for execution. Hancock helps him infiltrate the underwater prison Impel Down to rescue Ace. Inside he meets previous foes and new allies, such as former Warlords Crocodile and Arlong's old captain Jimbei. Along with Buggy and members of the Revolutionary Army, Luffy frees the prisoners, but Ace is transferred to Marineford for his execution.

Luffy and Buggy lead the prisoners into the war in Marineford between the navy and Whitebeard's forces. Whitebeard is eventually impressed by Luffy's spirit and orders his men to support Luffy directly. Although Ace is freed, he gives his life to save Luffy from Admiral Akainu. A broken-hearted Luffy is evacuated with Jimbei from Marineford by Trafalgar Law.

Returning to Amazon Lily, Luffy remembers first meeting Ace; after Shanks left Windmill Village, Luffy's grandfather Garp left him in the care of his friend, the bandit Curly Dadan. Luffy befriends Ace and Sabo, who are like brothers to him. Soon Sabo is seemingly killed by a World Noble. Jimbei encourages Luffy to "remember what you still have", to which Luffy responds, "I have my crew!!"^{[ch. 590]} After returning to Marineford with Jimbei and Rayleigh to send a hidden message to his crew, Luffy trains with Rayleigh on Ruskaina Island to learn Haki. He decides his crew will train for two years to become stronger so none of them will be killed while looking for the One Piece.^{[ch. 597]}

Two years later, the Straw Hats reunite and finally make it to Fish-Man Island. Luffy and the others meet Jimbei and the island's princess, Shirahoshi, and are drawn into a battle for the island against the Fish-Man supremacist Hody Jones. He, the crew, and Jimbei conceive a plan to defeat Hody and his henchmen in a way that will alleviate racial tensions between humans and fish-men. After Hody's defeat, Jimbei promises to join the crew at a later date and Fish-Man Island seeks to join the Reverie summit of human kings, held every four years. Luffy learns Akainu was promoted to Fleet Admiral and Blackbeard replaced Whitebeard as one of the Four Emperors. Luffy begins a feud with Emperor Big Mom over control of Fish-Man Island. The crew leaves the ocean depths and enters the secret New World island, Punk Hazard.

Upon arriving at Punk Hazard, half of the crew is captured by Caesar Clown, a subordinate of the Warlord and underworld broker Donquixote Doflamingo. Luffy and his crew ally with Trafalgar Law, now a Warlord, who plans to kidnap Caesar as part of a plan to take down Doflamingo and eventually his customer, Emperor Kaido. Samurai from the Wano Country, Kinemon, and Momonosuke join the alliance to venture to Dressrosa, the kingdom ruled by Doflamingo.

With Caesar hostage, the alliance lands on Dressrosa, where Luffy enters a tournament to win Ace's Flame-Flame Fruit. Here he finds out that Sabo is still alive and is part of the Revolutionary Army. Sabo wins the tournament, and with Luffy's blessing, Sabo consumes Ace's Flame-Flame Fruit. Due to the machinations of Doflamingo, some of the crew is forced to leave for the island of Zou. Luffy and the rest of the crew are forced to fight for their lives when they stumble on the truth of Doflamingo's operations, who attempts to kill everyone in Dressrosa to keep the truth of his rule hidden. With the aid of his fellow competitors in the tournament, Luffy defeats Doflamingo. In the aftermath, seven pirate crews pledge their loyalty to Luffy, despite his protests, marking the formation of the Straw Hat Grand Fleet.

Afterward, the remaining crew and their friends arrive at Zou and learn it was devastated by Kaido's army. Luffy also learns that Sanji, who joined the first group to Zou, had been blackmailed by his family into an arranged marriage to the daughter of Emperor Big Mom. The crew learns from the Mink Tribe about the Road Poneglyphs and their connection to the final island Laugh Tale, where the One Piece is. An alliance between the Samurai, Mink, Straw Hats and Law is made to defeat Kaido, who rules over Wano via a puppet Shogun.

Before storming Wano, half the crew, along with the Mink warriors Pedro and Carrot, infiltrate Big Mom's territory Tottoland both to retrieve Sanji and copy the writing on the Road Poneglyph that Big Mom has in her possession. Luffy and Sanji learn the wedding is a set-up to murder Sanji's family and steal their advanced technology, while Brook steals a printing of the Road Poneglyph. The crew reunites with Jimbei, revealed to be indebted to Big Mom but intent on defecting to Luffy's crew. They ally with Capone Bege to assassinate Big Mom at the wedding, though the plan goes awry. As the crew attempts to escape, Luffy defeats her general Charlotte Katakuri, discovering an advanced application of Observation Haki in the process. Jimbei formally joins the crew, but stays behind to aid his former Fish-Man crewmates in holding off the Big Mom Pirates as Luffy's crew escapes.

News of Luffy's fight with Big Mom and the reveal of the Straw Hat Grand Fleet cause Luffy's bounty to skyrocket. Meanwhile, the Straw Hats are separated entering the Wano Country. Luffy befriends the residents and promises to improve their lives. After Kaido attacks his friend Tama, Luffy challenges the Emperor but is defeated and thrown in prison. There, he re-encounters Eustass Kid and trains under Hyogoro of the Flower, learning a new form of Armament Haki that will enable him to damage Kaido.

Luffy's allies liberate the prison and makes plans to attack the island of Onigashima where Kaido resides. Jimbei arrives in Wano, and on the night of Wano's annual Fire Festival, an alliance of the Straw Hat, Heart and Kid pirates, the retainers of Kozuki Oden and an army of Samurai, launch a raid on Onigashima. Luffy faces Kaido across several bouts that push him to his limits.

The Five Elders send CP0 to interfere with the fight, fearing the repercussions of Luffy winning. Despite suffering an apparently fatal blow from Kaido as a result, the thrill triggers the awakening of Luffy's Devil Fruit—now revealed to be the Mythical Zoan-type Devil Fruit called Human-Human Fruit, Model: Nika. In his new transformation, dubbed "Gear Fifth", Luffy can fight in any shape he likes and successfully overwhelms Kaido, liberating Wano from his rule. A week after these events, Luffy is pronounced a new member of the Four Emperors.

After departing Wano, the Straw Hats reach the island of Egghead where the World Government's lead scientist Dr. Vegapunk resides. Jewelry Bonney also arrives, seeking to avenge her father Kuma's transformation into a cyborg by Vegapunk Vegapunk admits to having studied the forbidden Void Century and requests that the Straw Hats help him escape an assassination attempt by CP0. The situation escalates when CP0 informs the Government of Luffy's presence, and St. Jaygarcia Saturn arrives personally to eliminate him, accompanied by Kizaru.

=== In other media ===
Luffy has appeared in every One Piece video game to date, as well as crossover video games like Jump Super Stars and Jump Ultimate Stars, and is featured in the 2006 Dragon Ball Z-One Piece-Naruto crossover game Battle Stadium D.O.N. Luffy, Son Goku and Naruto Uzumaki were avatars in the MMORPG Second Life for a Jump Festa promotion, "Jumpland@Second Life". Luffy has also been mentioned in songs. He sings about being a wanted pirate in "Wanted!" and about One Piece in "Every-One Piece!" Luffy is a major playable character in the crossover game J-Stars Victory VS. Luffy and several other characters joined the cast of Dragon Ball in a spinoff entitled Cross Epoch.

In April 2011, Luffy and the other One Piece protagonists appeared in the first episode of the Toriko anime series and the crossover manga chapter. Luffy made a cameo appearance in a Weekly Shonen Jump episode of To Love-Ru, and the Gum-Gum was mentioned in the 50th episode of the Gin Tama anime series. He had appeared in CGI in the semi-annual live-action television series Yo nimo Kimyō na Monogatari (Tales of the Unusual) for the celebration of the series's 25th anniversary. He appeared together with the Japanese actor and model Hiroshi Abe.

== Cultural impact and legacy ==
=== Critical reception ===
According to Funimation Entertainment's Mike McFarland and Christopher Sabat, Luffy was more likable than Dragon Ball's Son Goku. Joe McCulloch preferred Luffy to Naruto Uzumaki from Naruto because Luffy "work[ed] his ass off" to achieve his goals after accidentally acquiring his powers. Luffy has been praised in a number of publications. T.H.E.M. Anime Reviews called Luffy "likabl[y] goofy" and an idealist with infectious optimism. In a review of One Piece The Movie: Dead End no Bōken, the fourth One Piece film, The Star Online described him as "an airhead and brilliant fighter".

Rika Takahashi of EX wrote that Luffy's stretching powers set One Piece apart from "the old stereotypical adventure manga" and the many other "combat-oriented mangas [sic]", making the series "something new and interesting". Anime News Network (ANN) writer Zac Bertschy found Luffy reminiscent of Rurouni Kenshin's character Himura Kenshin in personality and attitude, but still thought him entertaining. Mania Entertainment's Bryce Coulter called Luffy a "great shonen hero". ANN's Carl Kimlinger wrote, "Colleen Clinkenbeard's Luffy continues to grow on you".

=== Popularity ===
Luffy ranked first in all of One Piece Characters Official Popularity Poll. (Note: One Piece has a total of seven official popularity polls, six in Japan and one worldwide.) The only main protagonists that achieved ranked first in all of their correspondent popularity polls are Luffy and Gintoki Sakata. On The 1st Global One Piece Characters Popularity Poll, the latest official popularity poll of One Piece in which more than 12 million voted from all over the world, Luffy topped the list having total votes of 1,637,921.

Due to the character's popularity, allusions to Luffy have been made in several Japanese manga and anime, as well as Western comics and television series.

NTT customers chose Luffy as their second-favorite black-haired male anime character. The Gum-Gum Gatling technique topped the male category in a Japanese survey of the most popular moves in manga and anime. Luffy was even nominated in the Best Male Character category for the 2008 Society for the Promotion of Japanese Animation Awards. He ranked 22nd on Chris Mackenzie's IGN list of top-25 anime characters of all time.

In August 2017, a Japanese TV special voted Luffy the 8th "strongest hero" from the Showa Era as well as the 4th one from the Heisei Era. At the 8th Crunchyroll Anime Awards in 2024, Luffy won Best Main Character while Mayumi Tanaka was nominated for Best Voice Artist Performance (Japanese) for her performance as Luffy. Daniel Schlauch won Best Voice Artist Performance (German) for his performance of the character in the ninth edition. Mayumi Tanaka was nominated again in the Japanese voice acting category for her character's portrayal in the 10th edition.

Luffy had appeared in magazines, Japanese television shows, manga etc. Luffy was the first manga character that had been on the cover in the Men's Non-No fashion magazine's 24-year history and his clothes were designed by Shinichi "Miter" Mita. He also appeared in the cover of a famous fashion magazine, ELLE MEN together with Roronoa Zoro after the collaboration between One Piece and Gucci. Costumed character version of Luffy together with Goku appeared at the 39th International Emmy Awards Gala in New York and they stood on stage for presentation of the Children & Young People Award, won by the Chilean Children's program ¿Con Qué Sueñas? (What is your Dream?).

In the final chapter of Naruto, Boruto Uzumaki makes a drawing of Luffy as a tribute to him and the series. In a Weekly Shonen Jump manga, Tsugihagi Hyouryuu Sakka (a character resembling Luffy) says, "Instead of saying what you hate, say what you like!". In the One Piece manga, Luffy cited but changed it to "Instead of saying what you like, say what you hate!" The meme was acknowledged in the crossover fighting game, J-Stars Victory VS. Toei Animation sponsored the Italian Pallavolo Modena volleyball team in 2008; Pietro Rinaldi and Edoardo Ciabattini's black uniforms were decorated with an image of Luffy on the front.

Takashi Kawamura, mayor of Nagoya City in Japan, had cosplayed Luffy at the 10th World Cosplay Summit in which 40 cosplayers from 20 countries and regions all over the world were competing. Also, the famous Japanese actress and model Kanna Hashimoto had cosplayed as Luffy to celebrate the One Piece manga's 18th anniversary. She dressed up as Luffy (albeit in a feminine reinterpretation) for Weekly Shonen Jump's combined 37-38 issue.

Miltiadis Tentoglou of Greece posed Luffy's Gear 2 during his entrance before the Long Jump finals on Tokyo Olympics 2020 and won gold medal. Another Olympic gold medalist Massimo Stano pulled out Luffy's Gear 3 pose just as he was crossing the finish line. As well as Major League Soccer player Nicolas Benezet imitated Luffy's Gear 2 pose after scoring a goal on Sunday night in his first match with Seattle Sounders FC. China's most popular actor Xiao Zhan stated in an interview that he wanted to be like Luffy. He admired Luffy because, "he had been working hard to realize his ideals and despite always facing difficulties he never give up". Gear 5 was acclaimed by Polygon as one of anime's most iconic power ups ever due to the handling of Luffy's movements as he starts acting like Looney Tunes cartoon and becomes unique in battle.

In 2023, a Luffy balloon was used during the Macy's Thanksgiving Day Parade; however, an accident created a hole in the balloon, causing it to partially deflate at the character's hat portion. Luffy's balloon was used again in the 2024 parade.

In early 2025, during a collaboration between One Piece and the Los Angeles Lakers, Luffy and his crew members appeared in promotions wearing the team's uniforms, and a figurine of Luffy in the uniform was also created during the collaboration. In the same year, there was a collaboration between Toei Animation and the Los Angeles Dodgers, creating for the event an exclusive Luffy card for the One Piece Card Game, in which the character wears the team's uniform.

=== Tributes ===
In 2019, the island Sarushima was named "Monkey D. Luffy Island" (モンキー・D・ルフィ島, Monkī Dī Rufi-shima) from July 8 to October 20 in honor of the character and for the 20th anniversary of the One Piece anime.

In 2026, the beetle genus Luffy and two species (Luffy schillhammeri and Luffy nika) were named after him, due to their longer body features that reflect the character's rubber-like ability to stretch and expand. L. nika derives its name from the white hairs across most of the beetle's body, similar to the all-white appearance of Luffy's "Nika" form.

=== Awards ===
At the 2008 Society for the Promotion of Japanese Animation Awards, Monkey D. Luffy was nominated in the Best Male Character category. However, he lost to Alucard from the Hellsing manga.

At the 8th Crunchyroll Anime Awards, Monkey D. Luffy won in the Best Main Character category.

== See also ==
- Straw Hats
- Straw Hats' Jolly Roger
- Four Emperors (One Piece)
- List of One Piece characters
- List of One Piece pirates
