= Shigenori Sōya =

Japanese voice actor (born 1960)

- 宗矢樹頼
- Born: July 11, 1960 (age 66); Nagano Prefecture, Japan
- Occupation: Voice actor
- Years active: 1996–present
- Agent: 81 Produce

Shigenori Sōya (宗矢 樹頼, Sōya Shigenori) is a Japanese voice actor who was born in Nagano Prefecture and is affiliated with 81 Produce. He usually does supporting characters, such as Basil Hawkins from One Piece.

== Filmography ==
=== Television animation ===
- Guin Saga (2009) - (Goranth)
- Kuromukuro (xxxx) - (Zeth)
- Naruto Shippuden (xxxx) - (Bunpuku, Rōshi, Sanbi - Isobu)
- One Piece (xxxx) - (Basil Hawkins, Mōji)
- The Unlimited: Hyōbu Kyōsuke (xxxx) - (Norman Green)

=== Films ===
- One Piece: Stampede (2019) - (Basil Hawkins)

=== Video games ===
- God of War (xxxx) - (Hades)
- One Piece: Pirate Warriors series (xxxx) - (Basil Hawkins)
- Solatorobo (xxxx) - (Bruno Dondurma)
- Soul Calibur 3 (xxxx) - (Olcadan)

=== Dubbing ===
==== Live-action ====
- Chocolat (2000) – Serge Muscat (Peter Stormare)
- Jurassic Park 3 (2001) – Cooper (John Diehl)
- Before Night Falls (2001) – Cuco Sanchez (Sean Penn)
- Criminal (2004) – Richard Gaddis (John C. Reilly)
- Evolution (2005) – Officer Sam Johnson (Pat Kilbane)
- Exit Speed (2009) – Coach Jerry Yarbro (Gregory Jbara)
- Indiana Jones and the Temple of Doom (2009) – Lao Che (Roy Chiao)
- Oz the Great and Powerful (2013) – Skeptic (Ted Raimi)
- Percy Jackson: Sea of Monsters (2013) – Hermes (Nathan Fillon)
- West Side Story (2014) – Glad Hand (John Astin)
- The Assignment (2018) – Dr. Ralph Galen (Tony Shalhoub)

==== Animation ====
- Cars 2 – Francesco Bernoulli
- Dragon Booster – Connor Penn
- Gargoyles – Hudson
- The New Adventures of Peter Pan – Captain Hook
- Thomas & Friends - Spencer (succeeding Yasuhiko Kawazu)
