= Hiroshi Okamoto =

Japanese voice actor

Hiroshi Okamoto 岡本 寛志
- Born: 27 August 1977 (age 48); Nara Prefecture, Japan
- Occupation: Voice actor
- Years active: 2003–present

Hiroshi Okamoto (岡本 寛志, Okamoto Hiroshi; born 27 August 1977 in Nara Prefecture) is a Japanese voice actor. He began acting in 2003 and is affiliated with Aoni Production. He graduated from Momoyama Gakuin University, a private university.

== Filmography ==
=== Television anime ===
- 2003
  - Sonic X – Jailer B
  - Bobobo-bo Bo-bobo – Kuma
- 2004
  - Mobile Suit Gundam Seed Destiny – Murasame Pilot (Episode 15)
- 2006
  - Marginal Prince – Haruya Kobayashi
  - One Piece – Oimo
- 2007
  - One Piece – Basil
- 2008
  - One Piece – Captain John
- 2009
  - One Piece – Judy
- 2010
  - One Piece – Karma
- 2014
  - Dragon Collection – Rei
  - Inari Kon Kon – Kōji Tanbabashi
  - La Corda d'Oro Blue Sky – Wataru Kanō
- 2017
  - One Piece – Rabiyan
- 2019
  - One Piece – Charlotte Newji

=== Web anime ===
- 2014
  - Pretty Guardian Sailor Moon Crystal – Motoki Furuhata
- 2017
  - The King of Fighters: Destiny – Andy Bogard

=== Video games ===
- 2007
  - Reijou Tantei Office no Jikenbo – Sou Ibuki
- 2009
  - Samurai Warriors 3 – Takamaru, various
- 2014
  - Samurai Warriors 4 – Kobayakawa Takakage
  - 2nd Super Robot Wars Original Generation – Ing Egret
- 2016
  - The King of Fighters XIV – Andy Bogard
  - Samurai Warriors: Spirit of Sanada – Takeda Katsuyori
  - Super Robot Wars Original Generation: The Moon Dwellers – Ing Egret
- 2018
  - The King of Fighters All Star – Andy Bogard
- 2021
  - Samurai Warriors 5 – Kobayakawa Takakage, Takeda Katsuyori
- 2022
  - The King of Fighters XV – Andy Bogard
- 2025
  - Street Fighter 6 – Andy Bogard
  - Fatal Fury: City of the Wolves – Andy Bogard

=== Dubbing work ===
==== Live action films ====
- Adventureland – additional voices

=== Tokusatsu ===
- Ultraman Boy no Urukoro – Ultraman Dyna
