= One Piece: Unlimited =

One Piece: Unlimited may refer to:

- One Piece: Unlimited Adventure
- One Piece: Unlimited Cruise
- One Piece: Unlimited World Red
