= One Piece (2023 TV series) season 1 =

One Piece
- Season 1
- Promotional poster
- Showrunners: Matt Owens; Steven Maeda
- Starring: Iñaki Godoy; Emily Rudd; Mackenyu; Jacob Romero Gibson; Taz Skylar; Vincent Regan; Jeff Ward; Morgan Davies
- No. of episodes: 8

Release
- Original network: Netflix
- Original release: August 31, 2023

Season chronology
- Next → Season 2

The first season of the American fantasy adventure television series One Piece, based on the manga of the same name written by Eiichiro Oda, was developed for television by Matt Owens and Steven Maeda. The season was produced by Kaji Productions and Shueisha.

The season stars Iñaki Godoy, Emily Rudd, Mackenyu, Jacob Romero Gibson, Taz Skylar, Vincent Regan, Jeff Ward, and Morgan Davies. In the season, Monkey D. Luffy begins his search for the One Piece while assembling his crew, the Straw Hat Pirates.

The season released on the streaming service Netflix on August 31, 2023.

== Cast and characters ==
=== Main ===
- Iñaki Godoy as Monkey D. Luffy
  - Colton Osorio as young Luffy
- Emily Rudd as Nami
  - Lily Fisher as young Nami
  - Sophie Ellenbogen as toddler Nami
- Mackenyu as Roronoa Zoro
  - Maximilian Lee Piazza as young Zoro
- Jacob Romero Gibson as Usopp
  - Kevin Saula as young Usopp
- Taz Skylar as Sanji
  - Christian Convery as young Sanji
- Vincent Regan as Monkey D. Garp
- Jeff Ward as Buggy the Clown
- Morgan Davies as Koby

=== Recurring ===
- Aidan Scott as Helmeppo
- Peter Gadiot as Shanks
- Ilia Isorelýs Paulino as Alvida
- Langley Kirkwood as Axe-Hand Morgan
- Tamer Burjaq as Higuma
- Kathleen Stephens as Makino
- Armand Aucamp as Bogard
- Sven Ruygrok as Cabaji
- Stevel Marc as Yasopp
- Ntlanhla Morgan Kutu as Lucky Roux
- Laudo Liebenberg as Benn Beckmann
- McKinley Belcher III as Arlong
- Celeste Loots as Kaya
- Alexander Maniatis as Kuro
- Brett Williams as Merry
- Craig Fairbrass as Chef Zeff
- Steven John Ward as Dracule Mihawk
- Chioma Umeala as Nojiko
  - Kylie Ashfield as young Nojiko
  - Elihle Modise as toddler Nojiko
- Grant Ross as Genzo

=== Guest ===
- Michael Dorman as Gold Roger
- Ben Kgosimore as Mr. 7
- Kamdynn Gary as Rika
- Nicole Fortuin as Ririka
- Chanté Grainger as Banchina
- Audrey Cymone as Shimotsuki Kuina
- Nathan Castle as Shimotsuki Koushirou
- Brashaad Mayweather as Patty
- Milton Schorr as Don Krieg
- Litha Bam as Gin

== Episodes ==
No. overall	No. in season	Title	Directed by	Written by	Original release date
1	1	"Romance Dawn"	Marc Jobst	Teleplay by : Matt Owens & Steven Maeda	August 31, 2023
Following the execution of "Pirate King" Gold Roger, pirates take to the seas to search for his fabled hidden treasure, the One Piece. 22 years later, Monkey D. Luffy—a novice pirate who ate the Gum-Gum Fruit, a "Devil Fruit" that grants him elasticity powers, as a child—is among those searching for the treasure. Luffy stows away on the ship of pirate captain Alvida, defeats her, and escapes with her cabin boy, Koby, who dreams of becoming a Marine. Luffy and Koby sail to a Marine base in Shells Town to acquire a map to the Grand Line, a treacherous route believed to house the One Piece. Also in Shells Town are Roronoa Zoro, a pirate hunter who recently killed an assassin from the Baroque Works organization, and Nami, a cat burglar who also wants the map. Zoro is arrested for fighting Helmeppo, son of corrupt Marine Captain Morgan. Luffy frees Zoro and joins Nami in stealing the map from Morgan's office. Zoro helps Luffy and Nami defeat Morgan, and the trio escape on Nami's recently-stolen sloop while Koby remains behind to enlist in the Marines.
2	2	"The Man in the Straw Hat"	Marc Jobst	Ian Stokes	August 31, 2023
Luffy, Zoro, and Nami are captured by Buggy the Clown, another pirate captain who desires the Grand Line map, which Luffy swallows for safekeeping. Luffy learns of Buggy's former friendship with Shanks, Luffy's childhood idol from whom he inherited his treasured straw hat. Buggy subdues Luffy with his Chop-Chop Fruit powers, which allow him to split himself apart. While Buggy attempts to drown him, Luffy recalls a childhood incident in which Shanks saved him from being drowned by a bandit and used a mysterious power to protect him from a Sea King at the cost of his left arm, something Luffy has blamed himself for. The trio escape and defeat Buggy, freeing the townspeople he imprisoned. After the trio depart, Nami secretly contacts an anonymous figure about having the map. Meanwhile, Marine Vice Admiral Garp traces Luffy to Shells Town and, learning of Koby's friendship with him, becomes Koby and Helmeppo's supervisor.
3	3	"Tell No Tales"	Emma Sullivan	Matt Owens & Damani Johnson	August 31, 2023
After their sloop begins to leak, the trio—now dubbed the Straw Hat Crew—stops at Syrup Village in the Gecko Islands for a more capable ship. Luffy takes interest in a ship with a sheep figurehead, but is informed by Usopp, a dockworker who constantly gives false alarms of pirate attacks, that the ship is not for sale. Usopp takes them to meet the shipyard owner and his best friend, Kaya, a rich, sickly orphan, to ask about the ship. Staying at Kaya's mansion for the night, Luffy and Usopp bond over the former knowing the latter's father, Yasopp, a member of Shanks's crew. Buggy is captured by fish-man pirate captain Arlong. Kaya's butler Klahadore reveals himself as the presumed-dead pirate captain Kuro of the Black Cat Pirates. Planning to take over Kaya's business, he kills her lawyer Merry. Kuro's crewmates knock Zoro out and dump him and Merry's corpse in a well. Usopp flees for help, but no one believes him until Koby arrives with the Marines.
4	4	"The Pirates Are Coming"	Emma Sullivan	Tiffany Greshler and Tom Hyndman	August 31, 2023
After several failed attempts to climb out of the well, Zoro remembers a promise he made with his deceased childhood friend Kuina that one of them would become the world's greatest swordsman; the memory pushes him to successfully climb out. Usopp brings the Marines to Kaya's mansion, but Kuro dissuades them and hands over Luffy, who has fallen unconscious after eating a poisoned soup meant for Kaya. Zoro rescues Luffy from the Marines and defeats Kuro's subordinates Sham and Buchi. Luffy defeats Kuro enough to defenestrate him, but he survives and flees Syrup Island. Kaya rewards Luffy with the ship he wanted, which he dubs the Going Merry in honor of Kaya's late lawyer. Usopp accepts his invitation to join the crew and is kissed by Kaya before he leaves. The Marines catch up to the Straw Hats as Garp attacks them at sea. Luffy reveals that Garp is his grandfather, to the crew's shock.
5	5	"Eat at Baratie!"	Tim Southam	Laura Jacqmin	August 31, 2023
Luffy remembers how his grandfather wanted him to become a Marine when he was a child. In the present, Garp appears pleased when Luffy deters the Marines and escapes. They end up at Baratie, a floating restaurant, where Luffy befriends its sous chef Sanji. Garp hires Dracule Mihawk, a pirate known as the world's greatest swordsman, to bring Luffy in alive. Helmeppo tells Koby that Mihawk is one of the Seven Warlords of the Sea, powerful pirates whom the World Government found it more useful to ally with. Nami secretly makes plans to abandon the crew and flee with the map. When Mihawk arrives at Baratie, Zoro, who has idolized Mihawk since childhood, challenges him to a duel. Zoro is decisively defeated in the duel and severely wounded with his two swords destroyed, though Mihawk lets him and Luffy go free out of respect for their resolve. A humbled Zoro swears to Luffy that he will never lose again before losing consciousness.
6	6	"The Chef and the Chore Boy"	Tim Southam	Steven Maeda and Diego Gutierrez	August 31, 2023
Zeff, the owner of Baratie, treats an unconscious Zoro. Sanji tells the Straw Hats that Zeff saved his life by giving a young Sanji all of the food on a deserted island while Zeff ate his own leg. He also reveals his dream to find the All Blue, an area where all four seas meet and contains rare spices and fish. Koby learns of Garp and Luffy's relationship as grandfather and grandson. Arlong arrives in search of the Grand Line map, having taken Buggy's head hostage to find Luffy. Nami gives Arlong the map and reveals herself as his crewmate. Arlong throws Luffy into the sea, as Devil Fruit users lose strength in seawater and sink, and leaves with Nami; Sanji rescues him. In disbelief, Luffy feels he has failed as a captain until Zoro awakens and swears to stand by him as his first mate, while Sanji joins the Straw Hats as their cook. His confidence renewed, Luffy decides to go after Nami, with Buggy's head in his bag to help them track down Arlong.
7	7	"The Girl with the Sawfish Tattoo"	Josef Kubota Wladyka	Tiffany Greshler & Ian Stokes and Allison Weintraub & Lindsay Gelfand	August 31, 2023
Under Buggy's direction, the Straw Hats arrive at Conomi Island, where Nami's hometown Coco Village is under Arlong's rule. They meet Nojiko, her adoptive older sister, who reveals that as children, Arlong killed their adoptive mother Bell-mère. Garp questions Zeff about Luffy's whereabouts, revealing that he does not want his grandson to end up executed like Roger. Koby and Helmeppo get Luffy's location from a bartender. Nami reveals to Nojiko that she has been working for Arlong since Bell-mère's death to buy Coco Village's freedom by paying him 100 million berries. When Nami informs Arlong that she finally has the money, he betrays her by bribing Marine Captain Nezumi to confiscate all Nami's money and hide his crimes. With her efforts having gone in vain, Nami has a breakdown, stabbing her arm to remove Arlong's tattoo. When she is stopped by Luffy, she begs for his help. As the Straw Hats rally together, Arlong attacks Coco Village.
8	8	"Worst in the East"	Josef Kubota Wladyka	Matt Owens and Steven Maeda	August 31, 2023
The Straw Hats attack Arlong Park, during which Buggy reclaims his body and flees. Realizing that Arlong's tower contains 8 years of Nami's painful memories, an enraged Luffy destroys the tower, crushes Arlong and frees Coco village. Nezumi calls Garp to arrest the Straw Hats; Koby and Helmeppo refuse to arrest them, knowing they are innocent. Garp easily wins in a fight against Luffy, but the latter stands firm. Garp relents, as he had simply been testing Luffy's desire to be a pirate. Nami knocks out Nezumi as the rest of the Marines are ordered to round up the Arlong Pirates. Nezumi later puts out a wanted poster of Luffy, fulfilling his dream of having one. The Straw Hats' friends happily see Luffy's bounty, while Buggy and Alvida meet and plot revenge against Luffy. Garp, impressed with Koby and Helmeppo's will to stand by what is right, decides to personally train them. As the Straw Hats embark on their journey to the Grand Line, a man surrounded by smoke burns Luffy's bounty poster.

== Production ==
=== Development ===
In July 2017, Weekly Shōnen Jump editor-in-chief Hiroyuki Nakano announced that Tomorrow Studios (a partnership between Marty Adelstein and ITV Studios) and Shueisha would commence production of an American live-action television adaptation of Eiichiro Oda's One Piece manga series as part of the series' 20th anniversary celebrations. Oda would serve as executive producer for the series alongside Tomorrow Studios CEO Adelstein and Becky Clements. The series would reportedly begin with the East Blue saga. Adelstein also said the production cost could set new records.

In January 2020, Oda revealed that Netflix had ordered a first season initially consisting of ten episodes. In May 2020, producer Marty Adelstein revealed that the series was originally set to begin filming in Cape Town at Cape Town Film Studios sometime around August but had been delayed to around September due to the COVID-19 pandemic. He also revealed that, during the same interview, all ten scripts had been written for the series and they were set to begin casting sometime in June. However, executive producer and writer Matt Owens stated in September 2020 that casting had not yet commenced.

In March 2021, production started up again with showrunner Steven Maeda revealing that the series codename is Project Roger. In September 2021, it was revealed the first look at the logo for the series. That same month, it was reported that Marc Jobst will direct the pilot episode of the series; he was approached to direct the pilot by Netflix executives due to their positive relationship after Jobst helmed episodes for Netflix series such as Daredevil, Luke Cage, and The Witcher. Jobst agreed to work on One Piece due to the script's optimistic tone. In February 2022, it was announced that Arisu Kashiwagi will be the creative director and designer for the show's brand identity, where she will be creating and designing logo and title sequence etc. In March 2022, alongside the release of additional casting announcements, it was said that head writer and executive producer Matt Owens would serve as co-showrunner alongside Maeda.

=== Casting ===
In November 2021, the main cast portraying the Straw Hat Pirates was revealed via a series of wanted posters: Iñaki Godoy as Monkey D. Luffy, Mackenyu as Roronoa Zoro, Emily Rudd as Nami, Jacob Romero Gibson as Usopp, and Taz Skylar as Sanji.

In March 2022, Netflix added Morgan Davies as Koby, Ilia Isorelýs Paulino as Alvida, Aidan Scott as Helmeppo, Jeff Ward as Buggy, McKinley Belcher III as Arlong, Vincent Regan as Garp and Peter Gadiot as Shanks to the cast in recurring roles. June 2022 saw the addition of Langley Kirkwood as Captain Morgan, Celeste Loots as Kaya, Alexander Maniatis as Klahadore, Craig Fairbrass as Zeff, Steven Ward as Dracule Mihawk, and Chioma Umeala as Nojiko. In August 2022, Bianca Oosthuizen, Chanté Grainger, and Grant Ross joined the cast of the series, playing Sham, Banchina, and Genzo respectively. In February 2023, it was revealed that Stevel Marc had been cast as Yasopp. In March 2023, it was revealed that Jandre le Roux had been cast as Kuroobi.

In July 2023, it was revealed that the original Japanese voice actors from the One Piece anime will voice the characters for the Japanese dub. All the characters are dubbed by the original Japanese voice cast, with the exception of Arlong being voiced by Hiroki Tōchi, replacing Jūrōta Kosugi from the anime for unspecified reasons.

=== Filming ===
Maeda officially announced that principal photography had begun on January 31, 2022, and finished filming on August 22, 2022. In May 2022, director Marc Jobst updated that he had finished filming the first two episodes of the show. Part of the filming took place in Cape Town, South Africa, at Cape Town Film Studios. Nicole Hirsch Whitaker, the show's cinematographer, said that she had her crew six weeks before production began. The entirety of the sequence involving Luffy fighting Alvida had to be reshot as it was originally done in the daytime. Whitaker was unable to attend the reshoot due to scheduling conflicts and it was done without her.

=== Music ===
Sonya Belousova and Giona Ostinelli composed the score for the season. The soundtrack includes singles such as "Wealth Fame Power", "My Sails Are Set" featuring Aurora, and "Bang!" featuring Flawless Real Talk.

== Reception ==
Professional ratings
Aggregate scores
Source	Rating
Metacritic	67/100
Rotten Tomatoes	86%
Review scores
Source	Rating
Collider	8/10
/Film	7.5/10
IGN	6/10
Empire	4/5 stars
Radio Times	4/5 stars
WeGotThisCovered	3.5/5 stars
The Guardian	3/5 stars
Slant Magazine	3/4 stars
Consequence	B+
The A.V. Club	B+

On the review aggregator website Rotten Tomatoes, 86% of 63 critics' reviews are positive. The website's consensus reads: "One Piece captures the essence of its beloved source material with a charmingly big-hearted adaptation that should entertain longtime fans as well as patient newcomers." It also received a 95% audience approval rating on Rotten Tomatoes based on over 10,000 reviews. Metacritic, which uses a weighted average, assigned the first season a score of 67 out of 100, based on 22 critics, indicating "generally favorable reviews".

Brian Truitt of USA Today gave the series 3 out of 4 stars, writing, "In this energetic cross between Pirates of the Caribbean and Scott Pilgrim, with a dash of Doctor Who-style camp, a young crew of buccaneers goes searching for lost treasure and helps people along the way in a bighearted, swashbuckling answer to Stranger Things." Lauren Milici of GamesRadar+ wrote that the series "breaks the live-action curse," adding that the directorial choices "make it more than clear that the show was created by fans, by people who genuinely wanted to see something they love brought to (a new) life." Jesse Hassenger of The Guardian gave One Piece 3/5 stars and wrote that "the overall imagination of One Piece competes with this particular iteration's budget, which appears to be lavish but perhaps still not quite enough". The Hollywood Reporter's Angie Han wrote, "By putting its faith in its characters' youthful joie de vivre, One Piece delivers enough fun to thrill the inner child in tweens and grown-ups alike." Coleman Spilde of The Daily Beast felt the show "consistently surprises" although the "writing sometimes struggles to find a steady middle ground between the tweenage and adult demographics it's trying to appeal to". Spilde stated that as a good adaptation, One Piece is "captivating even to viewers who know nothing about the source material".

Kayleigh Dray, for The A.V. Club, viewed the show as an accessible adaptation with "major Saturday morning cartoons vibes". Dray also highlighted the amount of source material lore packed in – "even a cursory glance makes it abundantly clear that a lot of love and care has gone into all of its lush world building". Paste's Elijah Gonzalez thought the adaptation made the "wise decision" to handle a small amount of the source material by sticking with "the 'East Blue' arc, which spans the first 100 chapters of the manga and around 60 episodes of the anime". Gonzalez opined that this iteration "even occasionally feels more cohesive than the original" as it can introduce later aspects earlier "to create compelling overarching drama" and "aid certain backstories". Angelica Jade Bastién of Vulture wrote that the show "proves its willingness to hold on to what makes the original property so fantastic". Bastién also thought the changes in the adaptation, such as revealing the connection between Garp and Luffy much earlier, worked "damn well". Charles Pulliam-Moore, for The Verge, stated that the production design was key to One Piece feeling "like a living, breathing place with history that you can step into" and highlighted that "Netflix constructed a number of massive, painstakingly-detailed sets perfect to transform into iconic places from Oda's world". He felt that it is always "a bit of a gamble" when the show recreates "visuals from the anime"; however, "many of those gambles work out well". In contrast, Mike Hale of The New York Times felt One Piece was a "bland and generic" adaptation as "most of the verve and personality of the anime are gone, replaced by busyness, elaborate but uninteresting production design and – a sign of the times – an increased piety regarding the story's themes of knowing and believing in yourself".

Hassenger viewed "the actors' performance styles" as clashing with "some of the actors gleefully embody live-action cartoons, while others work in a mildly snarky YA register" – "multiple supporting characters goggle and mug like they're in a Terry Gilliam knockoff". Robert Lloyd, for the Los Angeles Times, felt with Luffy that the show fails "critically if not quite fatally" as the "character comes across as little short of insane". Lloyd commented that Luffy is "meant to be the spirit of the tale, but turns tiresome in human form, where he's surely supposed to be delightful" and viewed the other characters joining him as "arbitrary and improbable". However, Bastién felt Godoy did "a tightrope walk of a role" as Luffy and observed that "there just aren't characters like him in white-colonial media – men whose kindness is essential to their being". She opined that the "core cast works splendidly" but the supporting characters were more "lacking". David Opie of Empire stated "Rudd embodies the heart of the show with an emotive take on Nami" and "Mackenyu nails Roronoa Zoro's stoicism just as well as his intricate swordplay". Opie felt "no one shines as bright as Iñaki Godoy". Spilde viewed Godoy, Rudd, and Mackenyu as having "stellar chemistry" but that "the frenetic energy of the show falters when it becomes too contracted, spending more time on friendship than fighting". The show's choreographed fight sequences were praised by multiple critics.
