= One Piece (2023 TV series) season 2 =

One Piece
- Season 2
- Promotional poster
- Showrunners: Matt Owens; Joe Tracz
- Starring: Iñaki Godoy; Emily Rudd; Mackenyu; Jacob Romero; Taz Skylar; Charithra Chandran; Mikaela Hoover
- No. of episodes: 8

Release
- Original network: Netflix
- Original release: March 10, 2026

Season chronology
- ← Previous; Season 1 Next → Season 3

The second season of the American fantasy adventure television series One Piece, marketed as Into the Grand Line, based on the manga of the same name written by Eiichiro Oda, was developed for television by Matt Owens and Joe Tracz. The season was produced by Kaji Productions and Shueisha.

The season stars Iñaki Godoy, Emily Rudd, Mackenyu, Jacob Romero, Taz Skylar, Charithra Chandran, and Mikaela Hoover. In the season, Monkey D. Luffy and the Straw Hat Pirates embark on their journey across the Grand Line while facing off against an organization of assassins called Baroque Works.

The season released on the streaming service Netflix on March 10, 2026.

== Cast and characters ==
=== Main ===
- Iñaki Godoy as Monkey D. Luffy
- Emily Rudd as Nami
- Mackenyu as Roronoa Zoro
- Jacob Romero as Usopp (Note: While he was initially announced with the name Jacob Romero Gibson, which is how he was credited in season 1, the actor is credited on screen from this season onwards as Jacob Romero.)
- Taz Skylar as Sanji
- Charithra Chandran as Nefertari Vivi / Miss Wednesday
  - Aroop Shergill as young Vivi
- Mikaela Hoover as the voice and facial capture of Tony Tony Chopper
  - N'kone Mametja as Chopper's On Set Proxy
  - Gavin Gomes as Heavy Point Chopper

=== Recurring ===
- Callum Kerr as Smoker
- Lera Abova as Nico Robin / Miss All-Sunday
- Julia Rehwald as Tashigi
- Daniel Lasker as Mr. 9
- Yonda Thomas as Igaram / Mr. 8
- Camrus Johnson as Mr. 5
- Jazzara Jaslyn as Miss Valentine
- Brendan Murray as Brogy
- Werner Coetser as Dorry
- David Dastmalchian as Mr. 3
- Sophia Anne Caruso as Miss Goldenweek
- Rob Colletti as Wapol
- Mark Penwill as Chess
- Anton David Jeftha as K.M.
- Ty Keogh as Dalton
- Katey Sagal as Dr. Kureha
- Mark Harelik as Dr. Hiriluk

=== Guest ===
- Michael Dorman as Gold Roger
- Vincent Regan as Monkey D. Garp
- Nahum Hughes as Bartolomeo
- Jeff Ward as Buggy the Clown
- Ilia Isorelýs Paulino as Alvida
- Rigo Sanchez as Dragon
- Morgan Davies as Koby
- Aidan Scott as Helmeppo
- Clive Russell as Crocus
- Steven John Ward as Dracule Mihawk
- Joe Manganiello as Sir Crocodile / Mr. 0
- Sendhil Ramamurthy as Nefertari Cobra

== Episodes ==
| No. overall | No. in season | Title | Directed by | Written by | Original release date |
|---|---|---|---|---|---|
| 9 | 1 | "The Beginning and the End" | Emma Sullivan | Matt Owens & Ian Stokes | March 10, 2026 |
Shortly before Roger's execution in his birthplace Loguetown, he informs Garp that he has a son and entrusts Garp to raise him. In the present, Baroque Works assassins Miss All Sunday, Mr. 5, and Miss Valentine, massacre the marines in Shells Town to track down Zoro for killing Mr. 7. The Straw Hat Pirates arrive in Loguetown to restock on food and supplies. Zoro meets Smoker's second-in-command Tashigi, and obtains two swords for free after testing his luck with one of the new swords, which is supposedly cursed. Luffy excitedly visits Roger's execution platform, but is captured by Buggy and Alvida. Smoker watches as Buggy tries to kill Luffy, who laughs in acceptance of his possible demise, before he is saved when lightning strikes Buggy and destroys the platform. Believing Luffy will become the new Roger, Smoker attempts to capture him, but is stopped by Dragon, the leader of the Revolutionary Army. The Straw Hats arrive at Reverse Mountain, an uphill river that is the only entrance into the Grand Line.
| 10 | 2 | "Good Whale Hunting" | Emma Sullivan | Ashley Wigfield | March 10, 2026 |
The Straw Hats carefully steer the Going Merry up Reverse Mountain. Laboon, a giant island whale slamming his head against Reverse Mountain, swallows the Going Merry and all of the Straw Hats except Luffy. Luffy meets Crocus, the lighthouse keeper and Laboon's caretaker. 50 years ago, the music-loving Rumbar Pirates from the West Blue left Laboon with Crocus for the whale's safety. Garp assigns Smoker to the Grand Line to capture a Baroque Works agent alive and uncover the identity of their leader Mr. 0. Tashigi joins Smoker, having been convinced by Koby to follow her code. Inside Laboon, the Straw Hats capture Baroque Works assassins Mr. 9 and Miss Wednesday. The Straw Hats escape after Luffy sings to Laboon. Crocus gives Nami a Log Pose, a compass that always points to a nearby island and the only device that can navigate the Grand Line. Luffy paints his jolly roger onto Laboon's head. Crocus remarks to his photo of Roger that Luffy may be the one to reach Laugh Tale, the location of the One Piece.
| 11 | 3 | "Whisky Business" | Josef Kubota Wladyka | Tom Hyndman | March 10, 2026 |
The Straw Hats set foot at Cactus Island, where the mayor of its town Whisky Peak, Igaram, welcomes the pirates. The residents throw a party for the Straw Hats, but Nami and Zoro discover that they are all assassins for Baroque Works. Mr. 9 and Miss Wednesday escape the Going Merry. Mr. 9 leads 100 Baroque Works agents against Zoro, who kills all of the assassins except Mr. 9. Miss Wednesday regroups with Igaram (Mr. 8), and the pair knock out Luffy to steal the Going Merry before they are found by Mr. 5 and Miss Valentine. Miss Wednesday is Princess Nefertari Vivi of Alabasta, while Igaram is the Chief of Alabasta's Royal Guard, with both undercover in Baroque Works to find the link between the organization and a brewing civil war in Alabasta. A wounded Igaram sacrifices himself to allow Vivi to escape with the Straw Hats, ultimately being killed by Mr. 5's Bomb Bomb Fruit powers. Miss Valentine uses her Kilo Kilo Fruit powers to kill Mr. 9 for refusing to help them track Vivi. Miss All Sunday stows away on the Going Merry.
| 12 | 4 | "Big Trouble in Little Garden" | Christoph Schrewe | Lindsay Gelfand & Allison Weintraub | March 10, 2026 |
Miss All Sunday warns the Straw Hats that their next destination Little Garden is a dangerous prehistoric jungle; Luffy refuses her offer to hide from Baroque Works in a different island. Upon entering Little Garden, Zoro and Sanji compete with each other to hunt a dinosaur. Nami and Usopp are found by Brogy, a giant from the island Elbaph, who inspires Usopp to go there one day. Luffy and Vivi meet another Elbaph giant named Dorry. Dorry and Brogy, former co-captains of the Giant Warrior Pirates, have been dueling for 100 years. Mr. 5 and Miss Valentine follow the Straw Hats to Little Garden and meet with Mr. 3, a Baroque Works assassin who ate the Wax Wax Fruit. During the duel between Brogy and Dorry, Mr. 5 poisons Brogy's drink, causing Dorry to wound him. Mr. 3's partner Miss Goldenweek hypnotizes Zoro, Nami, and Luffy, while Vivi is captured by Mr. 5. Dorry, mourning Brogy's apparent death, is encased in wax by Mr. 3.
| 13 | 5 | "Wax On, Wax Off" | Christoph Schrewe | Joe Tracz | March 10, 2026 |
Vivi, Nami, and Zoro are trapped by Mr. 3 to be slowly suffocated inside his wax sculpture, while Luffy is kept by Miss Goldenweek to be her plaything. Sanji, searching for the other Straw Hats, finds Mr. 3's house and intercepts a call from Mr. 0. Mr. 0 sends the Unluckies, two animal agents, to verify his claims. Sanji kills the Unluckies and obtains a Log Pose pointing to Alabasta, and when Mr. 0 calls Sanji's bluff, he identifies himself as "Mr. Prince". Usopp discovers Brogy is still alive, and is given advice on how to be a brave warrior. Usopp frees Luffy from Miss Goldenweek and tricks Miss Valentine into freeing Vivi, Zoro, and Nami. Zoro kills Mr. 5 while Nami and Vivi incapacitate Miss Valentine. Luffy hunts Mr. 3 amid a forest of wax statues, eventually defeating him and freeing Dorry. Dorry and Brogy bid farewell to the Straw Hats and promise to see Usopp in Elbaph before resuming their duel. Mr. 3 kills Miss Valentine to prevent her from reporting their failures. As the Going Merry sails to Alabasta, Nami falls ill and faints.
| 14 | 6 | "Nami Deerest" | Lukas Ettlin | Alex Regnery | March 10, 2026 |
Four days later, the Straw Hats seek medical attention for Nami at the nearest island, Drum Kingdom. Ten years ago, Vivi's father King Nefertari Cobra and Drum's King Wapol had an argument at a Reverie, a meeting between the world's kings. In the present, Wapol has fled Drum with most of the island's doctors to escape the pirate Blackbeard and is gifted a Devil Fruit by Miss All Sunday for financially supporting Baroque Works. Drum's citizens, led by Wapol's former guard Dalton, are recovering from Blackbeard's attack. Luffy and Sanji carry Nami up the mountain to visit Dr. Kureha, Drum's only remaining doctor who lives in Wapol's former castle. The pair are frostbitten and bruised while climbing. They are rescued by Kureha's assistant Tony Tony Chopper, a reindeer who ate a Devil Fruit that gave him the ability to speak and walk like a human. Chopper and Kureha treat Nami's disease and Luffy's and Sanji's injuries. Meanwhile, Smoker and Tashigi find a marine base massacred by Baroque Works assassins Miss Thursday and Mr. 11. Smoker kills Miss Thursday and Tashigi subdues Mr. 11.
| 15 | 7 | "Reindeer Shames" | Lukas Ettlin | Elizabeth Hunter | March 10, 2026 |
When Luffy inquires about a jolly roger that belongs to Chopper, Kureha tells his group of Chopper's past. Chopper was adopted and named by Dr. Hiriluk, the only doctor besides Kureha that Wapol did not keep for himself. Hiriluk drew a jolly roger with cherry blossoms to symbolize his dream of curing every disease, after being supposedly cured of a terminal illness by looking at cherry blossoms. Discovering Hiriluk is still ill, Chopper gives Hiriluk a mushroom that he believes is a cure-all medicine. However, Chopper is informed by Kureha that the mushroom was poisonous. Hiriluk overhears that Wapol's doctors are sick, so he travels to the castle only to discover that it was a trap to get him executed. Sick, poisoned, and held at gunpoint, Hiriluk gives a speech about how a man dies not when his body passes away, but when his dream (which will be carried on by Chopper) is forgotten and he blows himself up. Dalton is fired by Wapol for sparing Chopper. In the present, Wapol and his lieutenants arrive back at Drum to reclaim it.
| 16 | 8 | "Deer and Loathing in Drum Kingdom" | Lukas Ettlin | Matt Owens & Ian Stokes | March 10, 2026 |
Wapol releases his soldiers on Drum, whom he has merged with their weapons using his Munch Munch Fruit. Dalton, Zoro, and Usopp lead the citizens in holding back the soldiers. Vivi goes to the castle to warn Luffy's group about Wapol's return, and Wapol and his lieutenants follow her. Sanji and Chopper defeat the lieutenants, while Luffy and Vivi fight Wapol. Wapol shoots at Hiriluk's jolly roger, but Luffy blocks the shot and throws Wapol out a window, separating the soldiers from their weapons. After the battle, Nami has recovered from her illness and Chopper joins the Straw Hats as their doctor. Kureha and Dalton bid farewell to Chopper by releasing artificial cherry blossoms. Kureha remarks to Dalton that Luffy is similar to Gol D. Roger, who both share the "Will of D." The Straw Hats inform Vivi that they will help her save Alabasta. Mr. 0, who is the Warlord Sir Crocodile, plans to conquer Alabasta to be closer to finding the One Piece. Miss All Sunday, whose name is Nico Robin, is working with Crocodile for her own separate goal.

== Production ==
=== Development ===
On September 7, 2023, Tomorrow Studios CEO Marty Adelstein revealed that the scripts for the second season were ready but filming could not begin until the SAG-AFTRA strike was resolved. Tomorrow Studios president Becky Clements stated that once they could begin filming, they expected the season would premiere approximately 12–18 months later. Netflix did not formally announce that the series was renewed for a second season until September 14. Clements commented that they've had "thorough conversations" on the second season with Netflix, Shueisha and Oda and "less extensive conversations" on seasons three to six. Adelstein and Clements commented that with over 1,080 manga chapters, there is at least twelve seasons of material so just six seasons would only cover half the total manga chapters. On April 23, 2024, Joe Tracz joined the second season as writer, executive producer and co-showrunner alongside Owens who is returning as co-showrunner.

=== Casting ===
Returning main cast members from the first season include Iñaki Godoy as Monkey D. Luffy, Emily Rudd as Nami, Mackenyu as Roronoa Zoro, Jacob Romero as Usopp, and Taz Skylar as Sanji. Actors reprising their roles from the first season as guest stars include Vincent Regan as Monkey D. Garp, Jeff Ward as Buggy the Clown, Morgan Davies as Koby, Ilia Isorelýs Paulino as Alvida, and Steven John Ward as Dracule Mihawk.

On September 14, 2023, Tony Tony Chopper was teased by Eiichiro Oda in a video announcing the series' renewal for a second season. On May 6, 2024, another video posted on the series' social media had Godoy celebrating the birthday of his character Luffy, ending by teasing the appearance of Mr. 3. In May 2024, casting calls were announced for Miss Wednesday, Miss All Sunday, Crocus, Mr. 5, Miss Valentine, Smoker, Tashigi, and Miss Goldenweek.

On June 25, 2024, Daniel Lasker, Camrus Johnson, Jazzara Jaslyn, and David Dastmalchian, joined the cast of the second season, as Mr. 9, Mr. 5, Miss Valentine, and Mr. 3 respectively. On June 26, 2024, Clive Russell, Brendan Murray and Werner Coetser were announced in the roles of Crocus, Brogy and Dorry, respectively. On June 27, Callum Kerr, Julia Rehwald, Rob Colletti and Ty Keogh were revealed for the roles of Smoker, Tashigi, Wapol and Dalton, respectively.

In 2022, Jamie Lee Curtis expressed interest in portraying Dr. Kureha in the live-action adaptation. On July 19, 2024, Becky Clements stated that Curtis was approached for the role but was not cast due to scheduling conflicts, along with confirming that filming is scheduled to finish in December. On August 21, 2024, Katey Sagal was announced to play Dr. Kureha, alongside Mark Harelik as Dr. Hiriluk. On August 22, Sendhil Ramamurthy was revealed for the role of Nefertari Cobra. On August 23, Charithra Chandran was announced as Miss Wednesday. On September 19, Joe Manganiello and Lera Abova were cast as Mr. 0 and Miss All Sunday respectively.

On January 12, 2025, Sophia Anne Caruso, Mark Penwill and Anton David Jeftha were announced as Miss Goldenweek, Chess and K.M. respectively. On the next day, Rigo Sanchez, Yonda Thomas and James Hiroyuki Liao were announced as Dragon, Igaram and Ipponmatsu, respectively. On May 31, 2025, at Tudum, it was announced that Mikaela Hoover would be voicing Tony Tony Chopper.

=== Filming ===
Filming for the second season was expected to begin in South Africa in June 2024. On July 1, 2024, Netflix announced that filming for the second season had started in South Africa. Filming for the second season wrapped on December 15, later being announced on February 4, 2025, that the production for the second season was finished, with a new image of Luffy and his crew in Loguetown.

== Release ==
The season was released on March 10, 2026. It consists of eight episodes and adapted several arcs from the original manga.

== Reception ==
=== Critical response ===
On the review aggregator website Rotten Tomatoes, 100% of 29 critics' reviews are positive. The website's consensus reads: "One Piece season two offers higher stakes, a larger scope, and plenty of adventure without buckling under the pressure of being a near perfect live-action adaptation." Metacritic, which uses a weighted average, assigned the second season a score of 80 out of 100, based on 8 critics, indicating "generally favorable reviews".

=== Viewership ===
The second season debuted with 16.8 million viewers in its first four days, with 136.2 million hours. It debuted at number 1 on the weekly global Netflix chart, having topped the Netflix charts in 43 countries. It also led to renewed interest in the first season, which returned to the global Netflix top ten chart at number 7, with 3.6 million viewers.
