= One Piece (2023 TV series) season 3 =

One Piece
- Season 3
- Showrunners: Joe Tracz; Ian Stokes
- Starring: Iñaki Godoy; Emily Rudd; Mackenyu; Jacob Romero; Taz Skylar; Charithra Chandran; Mikaela Hoover; Lera Abova; Joe Manganiello; Sendhil Ramamurthy

Release
- Original network: Netflix

Season chronology
- ← Previous; Season 2

The third season of the American fantasy adventure television series One Piece, marketed as The Battle of Alabasta, based on the manga of the same name written by Eiichiro Oda, was developed for television by Joe Tracz and Ian Stokes. The season was produced by Kaji Productions and Shueisha.

The season stars Iñaki Godoy, Emily Rudd, Mackenyu, Jacob Romero, Taz Skylar, Charithra Chandran, Mikaela Hoover, Lera Abova, Joe Manganiello, and Sendhil Ramamurthy. In the season, the Straw Hat Pirates help Nefertari Vivi fight a civil war in her homeland Alabasta instigated by Sir Crocodile and his organization Baroque Works.

The season is set to be released on the streaming service Netflix in 2027.

== Cast and characters ==
=== Main ===
- Iñaki Godoy as Monkey D. Luffy
- Emily Rudd as Nami
- Mackenyu as Roronoa Zoro
- Jacob Romero as Usopp
- Taz Skylar as Sanji
- Charithra Chandran as Nefertari Vivi
- Mikaela Hoover as the voice and facial capture of Tony Tony Chopper
- Lera Abova as Nico Robin / Miss All-Sunday
- Joe Manganiello as Sir Crocodile / Mr. 0
- Sendhil Ramamurthy as Nefertari Cobra

=== Recurring ===
- Cole Escola as Bon Clay
- Xolo Maridueña as Portgas D. Ace
- Awdo Awdo as Mr. 1
- Daisy Head as Miss Doublefinger
- Emilio Sakraya as Koza
- Omid Abtahi as Toto
- Jamie Ward as Pell
- Nabeel Khan as Chaka

== Episodes ==
| No. overall | No. in season | Title | Directed by | Written by | Original release date |
|---|---|---|---|---|---|
| 17 | 1 | "Where There's Smoke" | Christoph Schrewe | Ashley Wigfield | 2027 |

== Production ==
=== Development ===
In February 2025, the Writers Guild of America West website listed a third season of One Piece as a 2025-2026 production, with Matt Owens and Joseph E. Tracz returning as showrunners and executive producers. However, Owens departed the series in March 2025 to focus on his mental health, with Tracz remaining to oversee post-production of the second season. The same day, it was reported that a third season had not yet been greenlit, though Owens' departure was not expected to affect any prospects of one being developed. A third season was officially announced in August 2025, with series writer Ian Stokes serving as co-showrunner alongside Tracz.

=== Casting ===
Returning main cast members from the previous seasons include Iñaki Godoy as Monkey D. Luffy, Emily Rudd as Nami, Mackenyu as Roronoa Zoro, Jacob Romero as Usopp, and Taz Skylar as Sanji. Mikaela Hoover, Joe Manganiello, Lera Abova, and Sendhil Ramamurthy were promoted to series regulars for the season.

On November 3, 2025, Cole Escola was announced for the role of Bon Clay in the third season of the series. Two days later, Xolo Maridueña was announced for the role of Portgas D. Ace. On November 2025, Awdo Awdo and Daisy Head joined the cast as Mr. 1 and Miss Doublefinger. On August 2026, it was announced that Emilio Sakraya, Omid Abtahi, Jamie Ward and Nabeel Khan would appear in the season in recurring roles as Koza, Toto, Pell, and Chaka respectively.

=== Filming ===
Principal photography for the third season began on November 24, 2025, and wrapped on June 30, 2026.

== Release ==
The season is expected to be released in 2027.
