= Jersey Mike's Arena =

Multi-purpose venue in Piscataway, New Jersey

- The RAC; House of Horrors; The Trapezoid of Terror
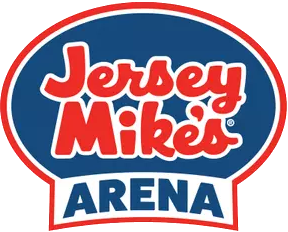

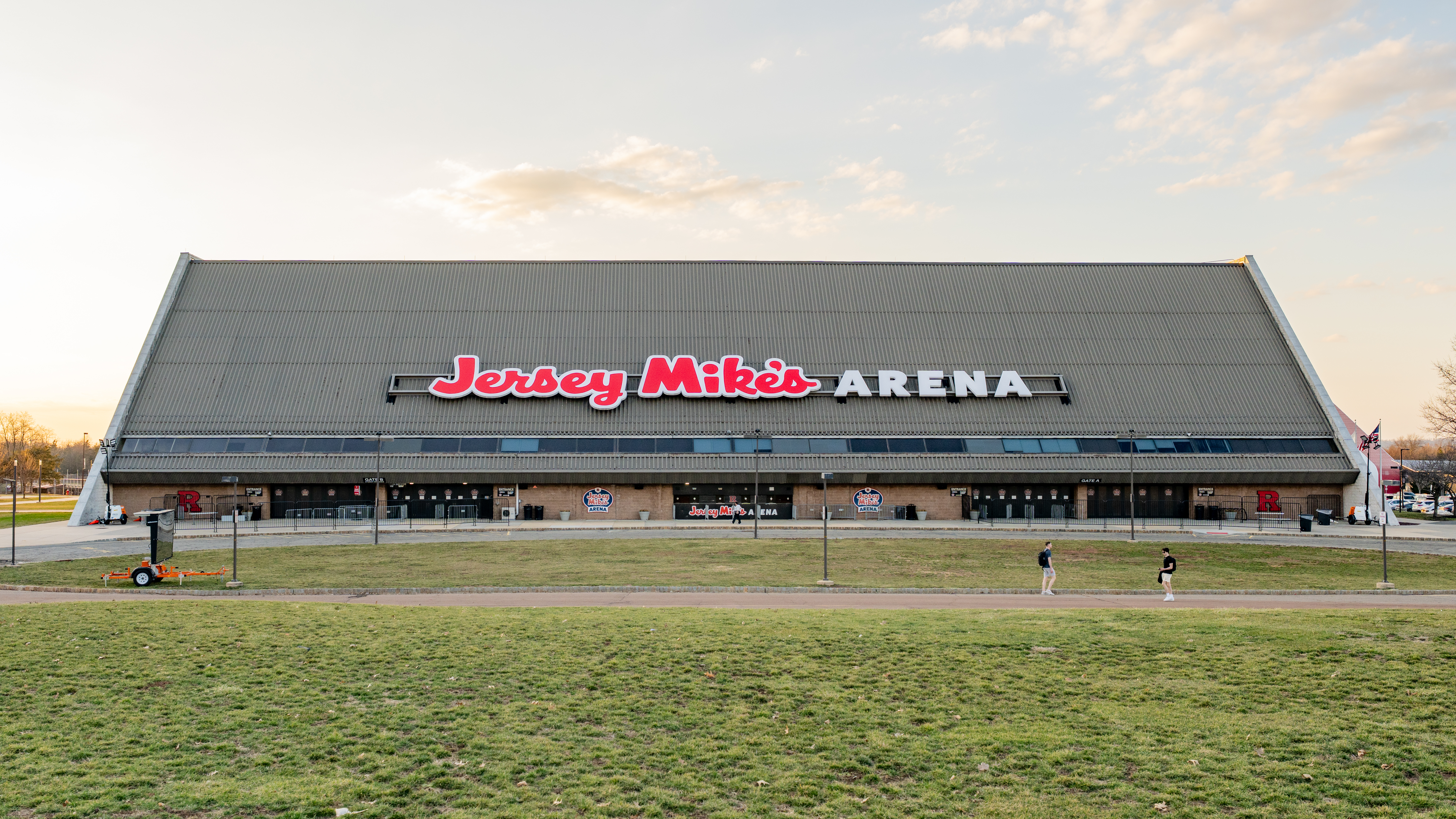
- Exterior view of the arena in 2026
- Interactive map of Jersey Mike's Arena
- Former names: Rutgers Athletic Center (1977–1986, 2019–2021); Louis Brown Athletic Center (1986–2019)
- Address: 83 Rockafeller Road; Piscataway, New Jersey; United States
- Coordinates: 40°31′31″N 74°26′28″W
- Owner: Rutgers University
- Operator: Rutgers University
- Capacity: 8,000
- Surface: Hardwood
- Scoreboard: Jumbotron

Construction
- Groundbreaking: 1975
- Opened: November 30, 1977; 48 years ago
- Cost: $8 million
- Architect: Robert Hillier

Tenants
- Rutgers Scarlet Knights (NCAA) teams: Men's basketball (1977–present); Women's basketball (1977–present); Professional teams; New Jersey Nets (NBA) (1977–1981)

Website
- Jersey Mike's Arena

Jersey Mike's Arena, commonly known as the Rutgers Athletic Center ("the RAC"), is an 8,000-seat multi-purpose arena in Piscataway, New Jersey on Rutgers University's Livingston Campus. The building is shaped like a truncated tent with trapezoidal sides on the north and south ends, and is home to the Rutgers Scarlet Knights men's and women's basketball teams, as well as the wrestling, volleyball, and gymnastics teams.

== History ==
=== Development ===
New Jersey governor William T. Cahill announced support for a new arena for Rutgers basketball during a game against Princeton in 1971 at the badly outdated "Barn" on College Avenue. He set a goal of a 10,000 seat venue, and provided $250,000 for feasibility studies. A bond issue passed that November, and by July the following year, the Rutgers Board of Governors unveiled a request for proposals. There were plans for a 13,000 seat arena in downtown New Brunswick, which turned out to be unfeasible. Instead, the university made plans for an arena on Livingston Campus, which would host 11,000 seats for basketball, ice hockey, and aquatics. One administrator opposed larger plans, hoping the university would not become "a basketball or a football factory".

The Rutgers Athletic Center was ultimately designed by architect Robert Hillier. Originally, he proposed a larger structure with modern amenities, however, the budget was limited to $8 million. Working with the cheapest structural materials he could source, the arena would have four massive support columns, and provide for 8000 seats, yielding a trapezoidal design. The arena has an off-white concrete facade and thin metal roofing. Construction began in 1975.

=== Opening ===
The arena opened with a 102-96 exhibition game win against the Soviet Union national team on November 21, 1977. This was followed up by the official home opener against rival Seton Hall nine days later, yielding an 81-76 win. The fans liked the then-new arena as an upgrade from "the Barn". It soon became apparent that the acoustics of the design made the venue very loud when it was full. Hillier credited the steep seating arrangement and materials used for amplifying the sound.

The National Basketball Association's New Jersey Nets played at the arena from 1977 to 1981, in between their time at the Nassau Veterans Memorial Coliseum in Uniondale, New York, and the Brendan Byrne Arena at the Meadowlands Sports Complex in East Rutherford, New Jersey.

The arena was known as the Rutgers Athletic Center until 1986, when it was renamed for Louis Brown, a Rutgers graduate and former member of the varsity golf team, who made a large bequest to the university in his will. Despite this, it was usually referred to as "the RAC" by students, alumni, fans, and players.

=== Renovations ===
The arena was upgraded with air conditioning for the first time in 2016, at the insistence of newly hired coach Steve Pikiell. He also had weight room and locker rooms updated. The bleacher section behind one of the baskets was upgraded the next year with premium seats and bar high-top tables, which increased revenue from that section by 40%. The Big Ten Gymnastics Championships were hosted at the venue in 2017. The venue hosted the Big Ten Wrestling Championships in 2020.

The arena was equipped with wi-fi in 2020 by the Rutgers IT department for $62,000, using off the shelf parts from Ubiquiti, which contrasted with million-dollar bids offered by outside vendors. The team opted to put equipment in the rafters instead of under seats, citing research that basketball fans are uploading more than downloading data. The design of the venue made it simple to install for each half of the main seating areas. The impact of the metal roof on radio signals also impacted the deployment. Once in use, the team found 10 to 20 percent of fans accessed the network on average.

=== Renaming ===
The arena was renamed Jersey Mike's Arena in 2021, after the university sold its naming rights to the sandwich chain in a 20-year $28 million deal, which includes signage inside and outside the arena, on the scoreboard and court. Additionally, the chain will be promoted in print and digital media, as well as radio and television. The deal begins with a $1.1 million annual payment that will increase to $1.7 million at its end on June 30, 2041. The signage cost $300,000 at Rutgers expense. The deal also will bring Jersey Mike's subs to the concessions, to be operated by Rutgers or a third-party. It also has opt-out clauses for both parties, with the sponsor able to suspend the deal starting July 2029 if upgrades or a new arena are not built, and both can unilaterally opt out starting in July 2036. Finally, an outdoor plaza is to be developed jointly by the two parties to the agreement.

=== Burglary ===
Rutgers opened a giveaway tour of One Piece Card Game cards promoting the second season of the live-action Netflix show on January 23, 2026 that would also go to Gonzaga University, St. John's University, University of Houston, and University of Illinois. Every attendee received a card at the first of three games, which scalpers attempted to buy to resell. After the second giveaway on January 27, an unknown burglar or burglars broke into the building and stole the remaining cards from a locked office that night.

== Acoustics ==
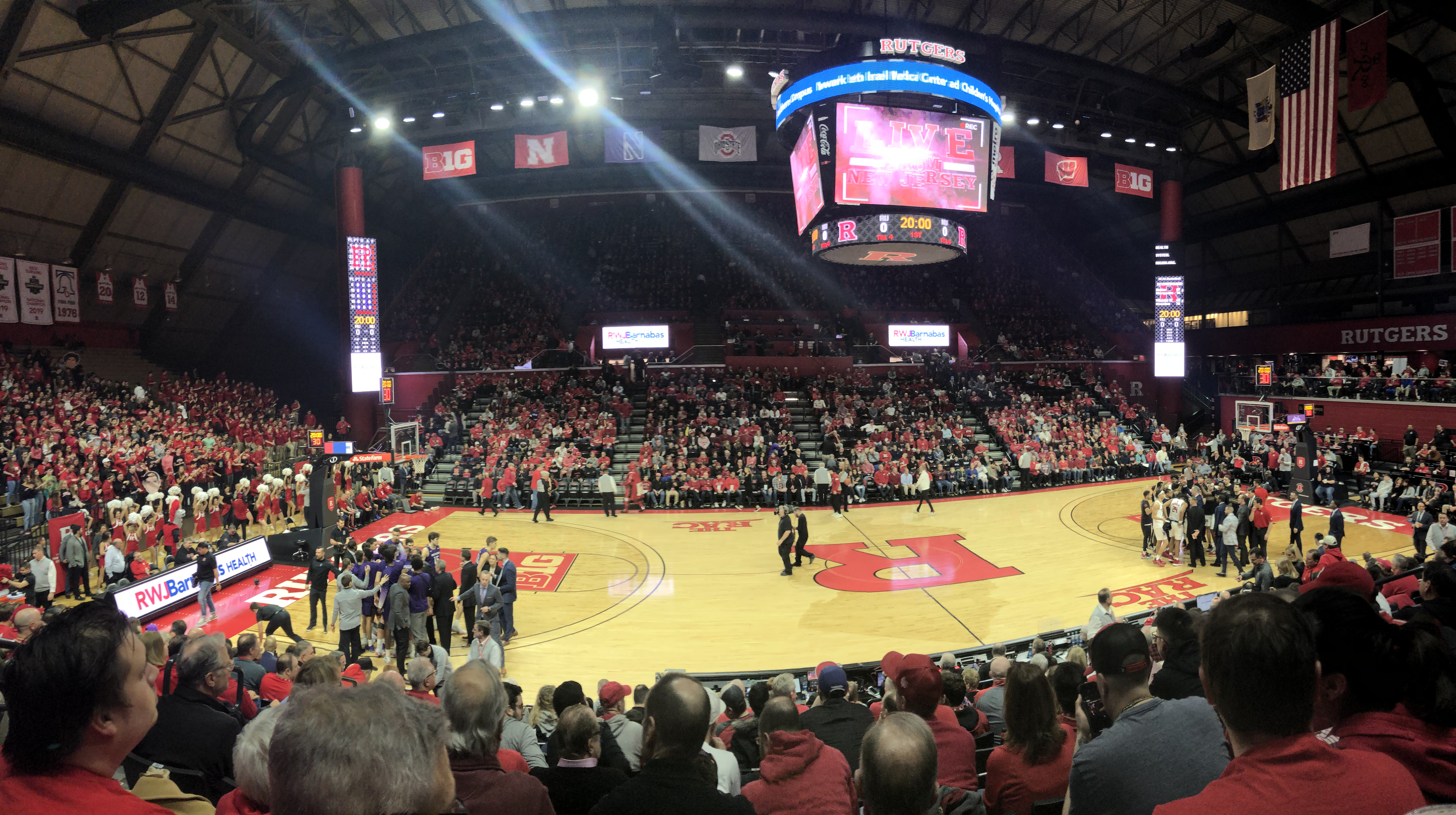
Rutgers hosts Northwestern on February 9, 2020

Jersey Mike's Arena is renowned for being one of the loudest arenas in college basketball at maximum capacity. The trapezoidal design of the building resonates crowd noise onto the court, creating a deafening environment. The RAC has even been described as being "louder than a 757 at Newark Airport." The acoustics have earned it a nickname: "the Trapezoid of Terror". Eric Zwerling of the Rutgers Noise Technical Assistance Center noted the hard surfaces and concrete structure reflect and trap the sound, which has been measured to reach 118 to 125 decibels, which can cause a temporary threshold shift, and with repeated exposure, damage the inner ear. A rudimentary study by the Rutgers Society of Physics Students measured sound levels around the arena, and found that it was loudest at the highest seats, where the compact flat surfaces focus noise. They also extrapolated that the court was louder than much of the arena, but did not measure there.

A Daily Orange writer referred to the arena as a "house of horrors" for Syracuse in 2005. A Milwaukee Journal-Sentinel writer reiterated the epithet in a 2011 article about Marquette playing there. A Syracuse Post-Standard writer in 2020 continued the tradition, musing whether it would still be a house of horrors without any fans in attendance. He said the arena is a "modern-day torture device", drawing a parallel to the medieval rack, and noted it feels like playing in a sunken pit. The journalist also noted that Rutgers had a 43.2% win rate at home, while only earning 15.4% away. Former Syracuse player Ryan Blackwell concurred that Rutgers does much better at home.

ESPN's Jay Bilas has lauded the arena, saying, "The Scarlet Knights play great there, and the crowd is right on top of you and intimidating." Many visiting players have also extolled the RAC's atmosphere. Former UConn shooting guard Ben Gordon said that "it is very difficult at the RAC...the gym is shaped, it seems like everybody is on top of you. At times, if you're not focused, you can get lost in the game just by how intense the crowd is." Former Syracuse power forward Hakim Warrick noted that "the way the gym is made, it's just made to keep the noise in. It's loud and crazy down there."

Current men's head coach Pikiell told Sports Illustrated in 2022 that longtime UConn coach Jim Calhoun said the arena is "as tough of a place as I've ever had to coach", and emphasized that Calhoun has been to every arena in the country. The SI writer agreed that it "might just be the toughest place to play in the nation" and is terrifying for opponents. He noted the team has a 32–4 home record contrasted by a 6–21 away record from November 2019 to October 2022. Rutgers player Caleb McConnell found it weird, unimpressive, and not ideal for a big school at first. After playing, he said the atmosphere was electric with the floor shaking and an inability to hear other players on the court. The noise was recorded at 115.3 decibels in February 2020. Illinois coach Brad Underwood said most Big Ten coaches will say the arena is the loudest. Former Penn State coach Micah Shrewsberry said "that place...strikes fear into you as an opponent".

== Other sporting events ==
The arena hosted the 1985 and 1989 Atlantic 10 Conference men's basketball tournaments. The arena hosts Middlesex County boys and girls high school basketball tournament finals, and various boys and girls New Jersey high school basketball state playoff games. A Professional Bowlers Association tournament was broadcast live from the arena on ABC in 1996, the Johnny Petraglia Open.

== Non-sporting events ==
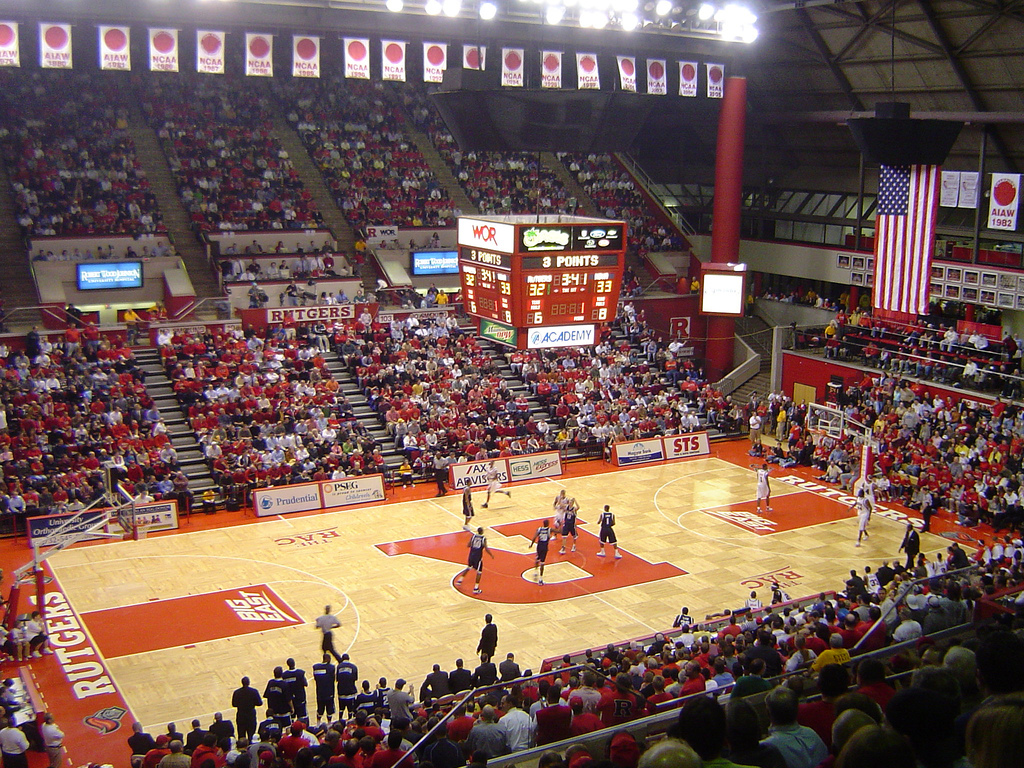
Rutgers hosts Villanova on January 11, 2006

=== Concerts ===
Styx played at the RAC during their "Grand Illusion" tour on October 24, 1979. Linda Ronstadt also played the venue on her "Living in the USA" tour, despite a sore throat. She returned again on April 11, 1980, for her "Mad Love" tour. Frank Zappa played a show at the venue on April 25, 1980. The Grateful Dead played a show on May 15, 1981. R.E.M. played with 10,000 Maniacs as opening set on October 22, 1987. The Allman Brothers, Cheap Trick, Supertramp, and Steve Winwood have also played the venue.

Visions-Innervisions Productions, a local nonprofit, hosted a fundraiser for Head Start and other community services in 1983 at the RAC beginning with the annual university Step-Show, viewing the debut of Michael Jackson's Thriller on 20-foot screens, one above each hoop, followed by a live performance from D Train.

Rutgersfest, an annual concert, was held in the arena in 2007 due to rain, and featured The Roots, Hawthorne Heights, and Everclear. Due to limited seating, only 5,000 tickets were given out, angering the approximately 15,000 other students who were then unable to attend. The venue hosted SpringBlaze 2008, a concert featuring Christian rock bands, with a special appearance by head football coach Greg Schiano.

=== Other events ===
Rutgers University Dance Marathon has been held at the RAC since 2014, having moved from the College Avenue Gym.

The arena is used every June as a graduation hall for J. P. Stevens High School, Edison High School, Piscataway Township High School, North Brunswick Township High School, and other area high schools.

== Proposed expansions ==
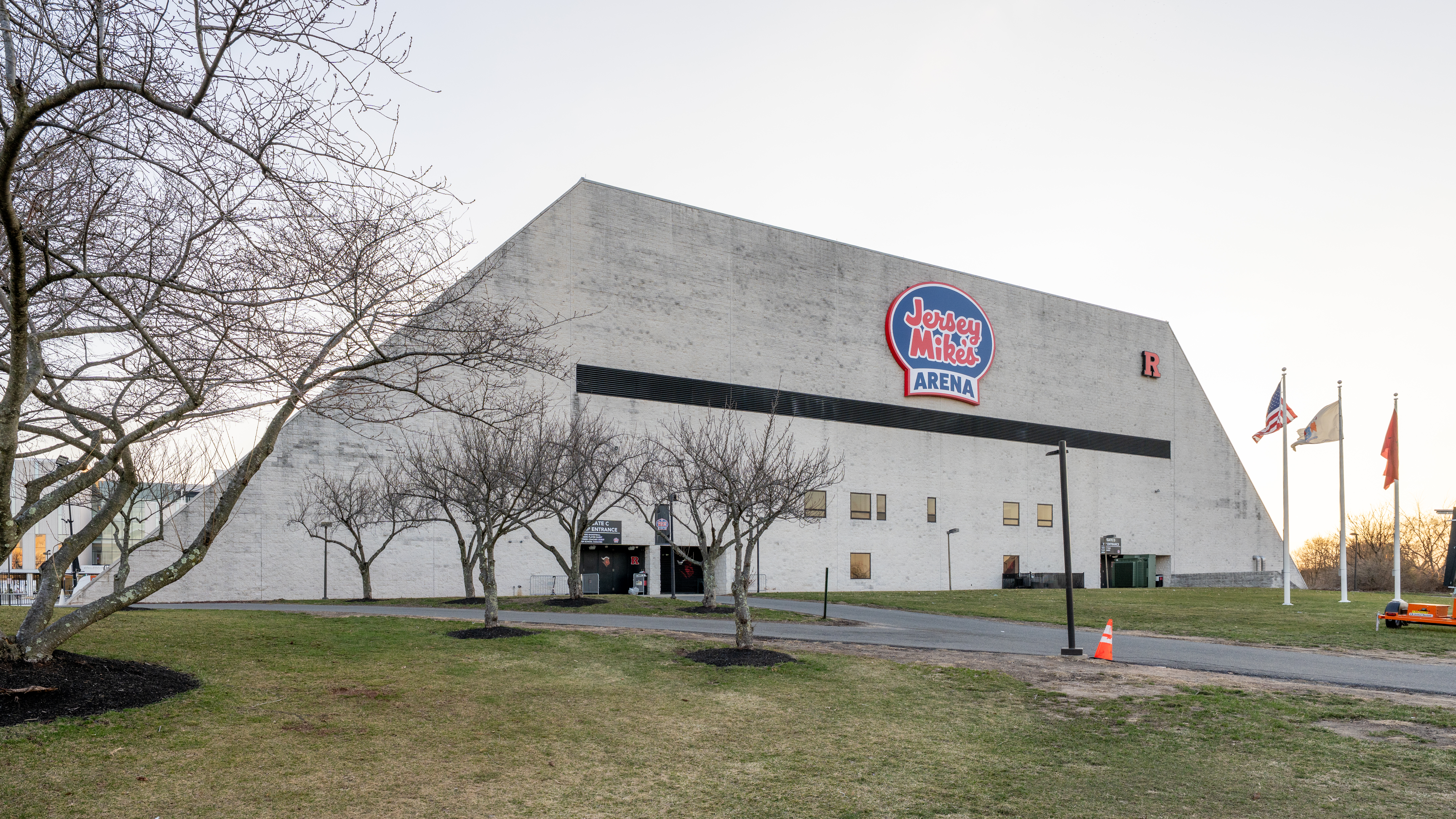
Side view of the arena (2026)

The Star-Ledger and The Daily Targum reported in 2010 that Rutgers then-athletic director Tim Pernetti planned to expand the arena to include more practice facilities, more concourse space, and a seating expansion to accommodate 12,500 fans (including club seating), and premium restaurants. Pernetti also stated that he wanted to book more concerts at the arena and at nearby Rutgers Stadium.

When the Scarlet Knights joined the Big Ten Conference in 2014, the RAC was the smallest arena in conference, with slightly smaller capacity than Northwestern's 8,117-seat Welsh–Ryan Arena provided at the time. However, after renovations of Welsh-Ryan Arena during the 2017–18 season, which decreased its capacity, the RAC became the second-smallest arena in the conference. The other 16 Big Ten schools' arenas all seat at least 10,000.

Rutgers athletic director Patrick E. Hobbs wanted to upgrade the RAC during his tenure, replacing office space with a lounge, and converting the media center into a bar. The New Jersey State Legislature passed a budget in 2022, which provided $100 million to renovate the arena after few changes in 45 years. Plans included modernizing the bathrooms and concession stands, among other facilities, and adding luxury boxes. Hobbs presented further proposals in 2023, which included club and premium seating, concourse updates, an open-air plaza, an exterior lobby expansion, and other upgrades. The goal is to make updates that will increase revenue the most. Engineering firm AECOM will be designing the changes.

== See also ==
- List of NCAA Division I basketball arenas
- List of New Jersey music venues by capacity

| Preceded by Nassau Coliseum | Home of the New Jersey Nets; 1977–1981 | Succeeded by Meadowlands Arena |
