= Celeste Loots =

South African actress

- Born: 5 September 1996 (age 30)
- Education: University of Cape Town
- Years active: 2020–present

Celeste Loots (born 5 September 1996) is a South African actress. She gained international prominence through her role in the Netflix series One Piece (2023–). On Afrikaans-language television, she is known for her roles in the Showmax series Trompoppie (2023–2024) and Wyfie (2024–), and the kykNET series Straat (2023–2024) and Suidooster (2024–).

== Early life ==
Loots grew up in Paarl. She speaks English and Afrikaans. Loots attended Paarl Girls' High School and then the Curro School in Durbanville. She began her studies in Law at the University of Cape Town before switching her course, going on to graduate with a Bachelor of Arts (BA) in Theatre & Performance in 2019.

== Career ==
Loots made her debut as Lily Williams in the back-to-back television films Home Affairs: A Christmas Tale and Home Affairs: A Love Story in 2020 and 2021 respectively. As announced in 2022, she was cast as Kaya in the Netflix English-language live-action adaptation of the Japanese anime One Piece. That same year, she played Tassia Middleton in the kykNET series Straat and had a main role in the Showmax teen drama Trompoppie as Zanne Peterson. The following year, Loots starred as Amanda in the Showmax university drama Wyfie, which received a Rose d'Or nomination, and joined the cast of the kykNET soap opera Suidooster as Hanli. She also made her feature film debut in the historical drama Lilies Not for Me.

== Filmography ==
=== Film ===
| Year | Title | Role | Notes |
|---|---|---|---|
| 2022 | Sporadies Nomadies | | Short film |
| 2023 | The Date | Maya | Short film |
| 2024 | Lilies Not for Me | Nurse | |

=== Television ===
| Year | Title | Role | Notes |
|---|---|---|---|
| 2020 | Home Affairs: A Christmas Tale | Lily Williams | Television film |
| 2021 | Home Affairs: A Love Story | Lily Williams | Television film |
| 2023 | Kampvuur | Daleen | Television film |
| 2023 | Projek Dina | Adeline | 1 episode |
| 2023 | FDR | Reporter 1 | 1 episode |
| 2023–present | One Piece | Kaya | Recurring role |
| 2023–2024 | Straat | Tassia Middleton | 12 episodes |
| 2023–2024 | Trompoppie | Zanne Peterson | 10 episodes |
| 2024–present | Wyfie | Amanda | |
| 2024–present | Suidooster | Hanli | |
