= Werner Coetser =

South African actor

- Born: 2 March 1988 (age 38); South Africa
- Education: University of Pretoria
- Occupation: Actor
- Years active: 1997–present
- Height: 1.75 m (5 ft 9 in)
- Spouse: Marijke van der Westhuizen
- Children: 1

Werner Coetser (born 2 March 1988) is a South African actor. He is best known for the role of Bernard Jordaan in the television soap opera 7de Laan.

== Personal life ==
He was born on 2 March 1988 in South Africa. In 2009, he obtained a bachelor's degree in drama at the University of Pretoria.

He married actress Marijke van der Westhuizen in 2020. The couple has one daughter.

== Career ==
In 2010, he made his film debut with Susanna Van Biljon and played the role of Hennie. In 2010, he made his maiden television acting with the serial 7de Laan where he played the role of Bernard Jordaan. The serial made his turning point of the career, where he played the role for five consecutive years until 2015. In 2016, he joined with the serial Gertroud Met Rugby and played the role of Blitz. Apart from television and cinema, Coetser also made sporadic appearances in stage plays, including Boeing Boeing, Huis Toe, and Vaselintjie.

== Filmography ==
Year	Title	Role	Genre	Ref.
2010	Susanna Van Biljon	Hennie	Film	
2012	Spoor(loos)	Producer	Short film	
2016	7de Laan	Bernard Jordaan	TV series	
2016	Gertroud Met Rugby	Johan "Blitz" Vermeulen	TV series	
2016–present	Sterlopers	Acteur	TV series	
2026	One Piece	Dorry	Netflix series	
