= One Piece Card Game =

Collectible card game

- Backside of a One Piece Card Game card.
- Publisher: Bandai
- Release date: July 8, 2022 (Japan); December 2, 2022 (Global)
- Type: Trading card game
- Players: 2
- Age range: 8+
- Playing time: 35 to 60 minutes
- Website: en.onepiece-cardgame.com

One Piece Card Game is a collectible card game based on the manga One Piece. The One Piece Card Game most resembles the Dragon Ball Super Card Game and Hearthstone. Bandai has created an official free tutorial app that teaches the basics of gameplay.

Unlike Bandai's past card games, which were solely based on anime series, the card game is used across the entire series including the manga and the live-action series.

== Development and publication ==
The One Piece Card Game is a new and separate card game to the previously released One Piece card game, which was also produced by Bandai. The new card game was released by Bandai in Japan on July 8, 2022, and globally on December 2, 2022. The launch included four themed-starter decks based on different groups from the series: the Straw Hat Crew, the Worst Generation, the Seven Warlords of the Sea, and the Animal Kingdom Pirates.

Manga creator Eiichiro Oda confirms the use of manga art in the card game. Moreover, a unique set of cards based on characters featured in Netflix's live-action adaptation of the anime.

An important part of the development of the One Piece Card Game has been its organized competitive scene, operated through official tournaments held by Bandai. Since the game's release, regional and international championships have been organized, featuring competitive events where players can qualify for higher-level tournaments and receive exclusive promotional rewards. Among the most notable tournament-exclusive cards is the Kaido ST04-003 Championship 2023 Winner card, which was awarded as a prize to winners of Championship 2023 events. Due to its limited distribution, connection to official competitive play, and status as a tournament prize card, it has become one of the most sought-after collector items associated with the One Piece Card Game. Tournament reward cards such as this one illustrate the growing connection between competitive achievement and the collector market surrounding the game.

== Gameplay ==
The game involves each player selecting a Leader and assembling a team (or "crew") to battle against an opponent.

Compared to the other big three trading card games (Magic: The Gathering, Pokémon, and Yu-Gi-Oh), One Piece Card Game separates the resource cards from the rest of the cards to prevent a draw of cards with no playable moves.

There are five types of cards split between the main deck or used elsewhere:

- Main deck cards:
  - Character – represent your crew and have the color blue on the backs of the card
  - Event – one-time effects that are played from the hand
  - Stage – represent the location where the crew is played, often providing a benefit to your Leader of Character cards; each player can only play one Stage card at a time
- Other:
  - Leader – they have the color red on the backs of the card and spend the entire time in the Leader area of the play area
  - DON!! – resource cards that have a white back and are put into a separate deck from the main deck

A player can only use other non-Leader cards that match the color of their Leader card.

== Promotional tour ==
Cards were being given away in a promotion for the second season of the live action series at college basketball games starting at Rutgers University on January 23, 2026, and continuing for three games each there as well as at Gonzaga University, St. John's University, University of Houston, and University of Illinois. Every attendee received a card at the first of three games, which scalpers attempted to buy to resell. After the second giveaway at Rutgers on January 27, an unknown burglar or burglars broke into the building and stole the remaining cards from a locked office that night.

== Reception ==
TheGamer comments that "less experienced players will find the streamlined rules to be beginner-friendly and easy to learn". First impressions by Dicebreaker comments the game "offers a solid gameplay foundation" with "remarkable consistency and quality of its art design" that "certainly has an exciting future ahead".
