= Marty Adelstein =

American television producer

Martin Adelstein
- Born: Martin Bruce Adelstein
- Occupations: Television producer, Film producer

Martin Bruce Adelstein is an American television producer. Before becoming a producer, he was a partner at the Endeavor Talent Agency, where he was one of the founding members. As of 2019, Adelstein is the CEO and founder of Tomorrow Studios, a joint venture between Adelstein and ITV Studios.

== Years as an agent ==
Adelstein has represented writer David E. Kelley for over 20 years. He discovered Kelley after he read his script called "From the Hip" and brought him to Los Angeles to work on his first show L.A. Law. He also discovered Dwayne "The Rock" Johnson while representing the WWF. Adelstein booked him to host Saturday Night Live and the show received the highest rating in 10 years. He was subsequently put in the film The Mummy Returns where he received 5 million dollars for 5 minutes of screen time as The Scorpion King. He also brought actress/writer Tina Fey to the agency as well as writers Bonnie and Terry Turner who went on to create 3rd Rock from the Sun and That '70s Show.

== Years as a producer ==
Adelstein has produced many television series, including the MTV series Teen Wolf, the NBC series Aquarius, the critically acclaimed 2011 film Hanna and the ABC/Fox sitcom Last Man Standing.

== Personal life ==
Adelstein is married and has three children.

== Filmography ==
- Prison Break
- Teen Wolf
- Last Man Standing
- Aquarius
- Good Behavior
- Supreme Courtships
- Black Christmas
- Point Pleasant
- Tru Calling
- Mr. Ed

== Current projects ==
Title	Premiere / Release	Network	Note	Ref(s)
Hanna	February 3, 2019 – November 24, 2021	Amazon Prime Video	TV series adaptation of the film that Adelstein produced	
Snowpiercer	May 17, 2020 – September 22, 2024	TNT (seasons 1–3); AMC (season 4)	TV series adaptation of the film of the same name	
Physical	June 18, 2021 – September 27, 2023	Apple TV+		
Ten Year Old Tom	September 30, 2021 – June 29, 2023	HBO Max (season 1); Max (season 2)		
Cowboy Bebop	November 19, 2021	Netflix	Live action TV series adaptation of the anime series of the same name	
One Piece	August 31, 2023 – present	Netflix	Live action TV series adaptation of the manga series of the same name	
Trump: It Happened Here	TBA		In development	

== Awards and nomination ==
FOX Production Awards 2008(Best Long Term Show)
