= Vincent Regan =

British actor (born 1965)

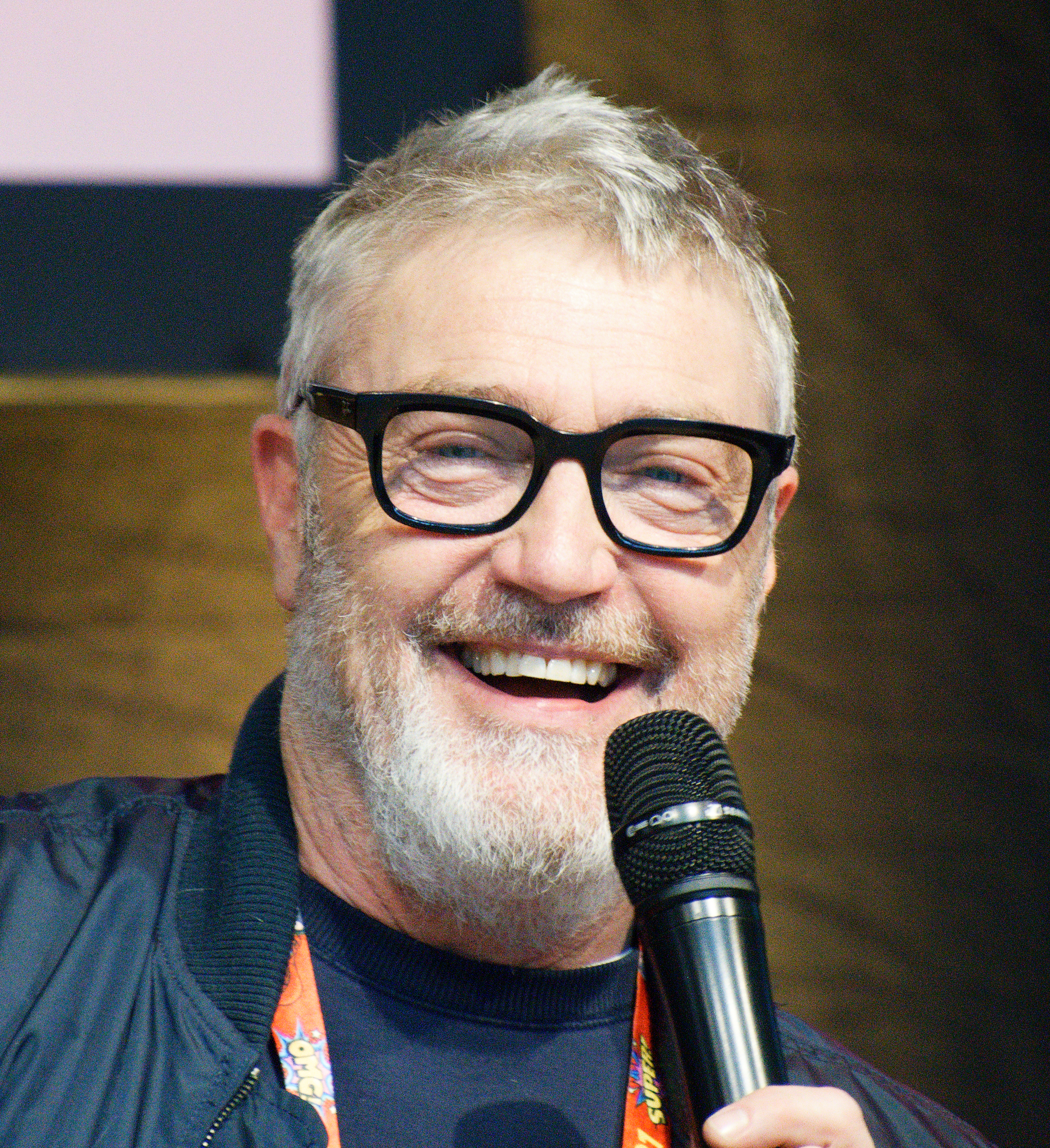
- Regan in 2023
- Born: 16 May 1965 (age 61); Swansea, Glamorgan, Wales
- Education: Academy of Live and Recorded Arts (BA)
- Years active: 1992–present

Vincent Regan (born 16 May 1965) is a British film and television actor.

== Early life ==
Regan born 16 May 1965 in Swansea, Glamorgan, Wales. He attended St Joseph's College, Ipswich, when his parents Patrick and Catherine returned to Ireland in 1983 he went to London and studied at Academy of Live and Recorded Arts in London.

== Career ==
Regan first came on UK TV screens in series 5 (1992) of LWT's London's Burning, playing Don, the love interest of Firefighter Kate Stevens (Samantha Beckinsale). That same year he played PC Shelby alongside Sir David Jason’s DI Jack Frost in the TV series A Touch of Frost. Regan has over 15 stage roles to his credit, most recently as Achilles in Troilus and Cressida at the Edinburgh International Festival.

In 1999, Regan received an Irish Best Actor nomination for his co-starring performance in the miniseries Eureka Street. In 2005, he starred as Marc Antony alongside Emily Blunt and James Frain in the miniseries Empire (2005).

He appeared in Troy (2004), where he played Eudorus, Achilles' second in command, in the Battle of Thermopylae-based film 300 (2006), in which he played Captain Artemis, and as King Cepheus in Clash of the Titans (2010).

In 2012, Regan announced his intention to launch the East Riding Theatre in Beverley, East Yorkshire, along with Judi Dench and other professional actors. That year, he appeared in the films Outside Bet and Lockout

Regan is also a screenwriter and director, developing projects for his own film company. His script, Come Like Shadows, is an accessible but classic interpretation of Macbeth headlined by Sean Bean and Tilda Swinton and will be directed by John Maybury. He also appeared briefly as a sexually confused character in British series The Street.

In 2013, he guest starred in the first episode of Series 10 of New Tricks. He played the Duke of Savoy in the 4th episode of the BBC series The Musketeers in 2014.

Regan joined the cast of the BBC's Atlantis as Dion for series 2 starting November 2014.

He was King Simon in E!'s The Royals.

In 2023, he appeared as Vice Admiral Garp in One Piece.

== Filmography ==
=== Film ===
Year	Title	Role	Notes
1994	Black Beauty	Sleazy Horse Dealer	
1996	Hard Men	Tone	
1999	The Messenger: The Story of Joan of Arc	Buck	
2000	Ordinary Decent Criminal	Shay Kirby	
2001	Black Knight	Percival, Leo's Chief Henchman	
2004	Troy	Eudorus	
2005	Unleashed	Raffles	
2006	300	Captain Artemis	
2008	Bathory	Ferenc Nádasdy	
2010	Eva	Tudor	
2010	Clash of the Titans	Cepheus	
2010	The Big I Am	Barber	
2010	Bonded by Blood	Michael Steele	
2011	The Holding	Aden	
2011	Ghost Rider: Spirit of Vengeance	Toma Nikasevic	
2012	Lockout	Alex	
2012	Snow White and the Huntsman	Duke Hammond	
2012	St George's Day	Albert Ball	
2013	Vendetta	Colonel Leach	
2013	Dementamania	Nicholas Lemarchand	
2014	Top Dog	Mr Watson	
2016	City of Tiny Lights	Tall Man / Schaeffer	
2018	Naked Normandy	Bradley	
2019	Dark Encounter	Morgan	
2023	Luther: The Fallen Sun	Dennis McCabe	
2023	Aquaman and the Lost Kingdom	King Atlan	
2026	Rise of the Footsoldier: Retribution		

=== Television ===
Year	Title	Role	Notes
1992	Between the Lines	Thomas McMurray	1 episode
1992	The Ruth Rendell Mysteries	Dr. Jim Moss	1 episode
1992	Boon	Robert Cady	1 episode
1992	London's Burning	Don	Recurring role, 5 episodes
1992	A Touch of Frost	PC Shelby	1 episode
1993; 1995	The Bill	Carl Deakin / Liam Fitzgerald	2 episodes
1994	Peak Practice	Peter Doland	1 episode
1994	Chandler & Co	Chris	1 episode
1994	Blue Heaven	Barney	1 episode
1995	99-1	Curtis	1 episode
1995	Moving Story	Jamie	1 episode
1996	Call Red	Ray Sidley	1 episode
1998	Invasion: Earth	Flight Lieutenant Chris Drake	Miniseries, 6 episodes
1998	Jeremiah	King Zedekiah	Television film
1999	Eureka Street	Jake	Miniseries, 4 episodes
2001	Rebel Heart	Tom O'Toole	Miniseries, 4 episodes
2002	Rescue Me	Matthew Nash	Main role, 6 episodes
2003	Killing Hitler	Major General Gerald Templer	Television film
2003	Murphy's Law	Hatcher	1 episode
2005	Murder Investigation Team	Paul Harris	1 episode
2005	Hustle	DCI Wells	1 episode
2005	Empire	Marc Antony	Miniseries, 5 episodes
2005	ShakespeaRe-Told	Duncan Docherty	1 episode
2006	Low Winter Sun	George Torrance	Miniseries, 2 episodes
2006–2007	Wild at Heart	Simon Adams	2 episodes
2007	Lewis	David Hayward	1 episode
2007	Agatha Christie's Marple	Mickey Gorman	1 episode
2007	The Street	Charlie Morgan	4 episodes
2009	Trial & Retribution	McGill	1 episode
2009	The Prisoner	909	Miniseries, 1 episode
2010	Wallander	Anders Ekman	1 episode
2010	Mistresses	Chris Webb	4 episodes
2010	Spooks	Alec White	1 episode
2010	The Nativity	Herod the Great	Miniseries, 3 episodes
2011	Camelot	Caliburn	1 episode
2011	Inspector George Gently	Peter Holdaway	1 episode
2011–2012	Scott & Bailey	DCS Dave Murray	Recurring role, 5 episodes
2012	Silent Witness	Det Supt Tom Byrne	2 episodes
2012	Hit & Miss	John	Main role, 5 episodes
2012	Strike Back	Karl Matlock	Recurring role, 10 episodes
2013	Agatha Christie's Poirot	Detective Inspector Beale	1 episode
2013	New Tricks	Harry Truman	2 episodes
2013	Starlings	Stephen	2 episodes
2014	Midsomer Murders	Professor Philip Hamilton	1 episode
2014	The Musketeers	Duke Savoy	1 episode
2014	Silk	DCI Fitzpatrick	2 episodes
2014	From There to Here	Stapleton	Miniseries, 3 episodes
2014	Atlantis	Dion	Recurring role, 5 episodes
2015	A.D. The Bible Continues	Pontius Pilate	Miniseries, 12 episodes
2016	Undercover	Dominic Carter	Main role, 6 episodes
2016	Hooten & the Lady	Kane	1 episode
2017	The White Princess	Jasper Tudor	Miniseries, 5 episodes
2015–2018	The Royals	King Simon Henstridge	Main role, 14 episodes
2017–2018	Snatch	Chief Superintendent Jones	Recurring role, 6 episodes
2018	Vera	Michael Glenn	1 episode
2018	Delicious	Mason Elliot	Main role, 4 episodes
2019	Victoria	King Louis Philippe	Main role, 2 episodes
2019	Poldark	Edward Despard	Main role, 6 episodes
2019–2022	Traces	Phil MacAfee	Recurring role, 6 episodes
2020	Flesh and Blood	Tony	Miniseries, 4 episodes
2021–2023	Before We Die	Billy Murdoch	Main role, 11 episodes
2022	The Bay	Ray Conlon	Recurring role, 6 episodes
2022	Agatha Raisin	Monty Jones	1 episode
2023–present	One Piece	Monkey D. Garp	Main role, 10 episodes
2024–2026	House of the Dragon	Rickard Thorne	Recurring role, 8 episodes
2024	Shetland	John Harris	Recurring role, 6 episodes
