= Charithra Chandran =

British actress (born 1997)

- Born: Charithra Surya Chandran; 17 January 1997 (age 29); Perth, Scotland
- Education: New College, Oxford (BA)
- Occupation: Actress
- Years active: 2020–present

Charithra Surya Chandran (/tʃəˈriːθrə ˈtʃændræn/; born 17 January 1997) is a British actress. On television, she is known for her roles in the Amazon spy thriller Alex Rider (2021) and the Netflix series Bridgerton (2022) and One Piece (2026). Her films include How to Date Billy Walsh (2024) and Fight or Flight (2025).

== Early life and education ==
Charithra was born in Perth, Scotland, the daughter of Tamil medical professionals. Her parents separated when she was two, and she left for India with her father where she stayed with her grandparents in Tamil Nadu. Upon returning to the UK when she was four, she went to school in Liverpool, England. She then boarded at Moreton Hall Preparatory School in Suffolk from six to eleven before settling down with her mother in Oxford for her teenage years whilst her father lived in Wales.

Charithra completed sixth form at Oxford High School. She then went on to graduate with a Bachelor of Arts in Philosophy, politics and economics from the New College of the University of Oxford in 2019. She participated in a number of productions during university and joined the National Youth Theatre. She worked part-time for the New Policy Institute after taking a gap year, during which she did drama as a hobby before deciding to make it her career, turning down a job offer from BCG. In 2021, Charithra worked as a research assistant on a project on electoral symbols and vote choice in India. This article was published in 2024 in the peer-reviewed political science journal Political Science Research and Methods.^{9}

== Career ==
In 2021, Charithra joined the main cast of the spy thriller series Alex Rider as Sabina Pleasance for its second series on IMDb TV. Having auditioned before the first series aired, Charithra starred as Edwina in the second series, based on the novel The Viscount Who Loved Me, of the Shondaland-produced Netflix period drama Bridgerton alongside Jonathan Bailey and Simone Ashley in 2022.

In June 2022, Charithra voiced the courtesan Camille for BBC Radio 3 in an audio adaptation of Pam Gems' stage play, Camille, based on the novel La Dame aux Camélias by Alexandre Dumas fils. This production was shortlisted for the 2023 BBC Audio Drama Awards, Best Adaptation. This was followed by a further voice role as Mia in Meet Cute's September 2022 audio series A Mid-Semester Night's Dream. The series is a retelling of Shakespeare's A Midsummer Night's Dream in which a group of graduate students discover a magical print of the play.

In 2024, she made her West End debut as Eileen in Rosie Day's Instructions for a Teenage Armageddon. The same year, she starred in the Amazon Prime comedy film How to Date Billy Walsh as Amelia. It was announced that Charithra will lead and associate produce Song of the Sun God, a six-part drama series based on the novel of the same name by Shankari Chandran. In August 2024, it was announced that Charithra would play Nefertari Vivi in the live-action adaptation of the manga One Piece.

== Acting credits ==
=== Film ===
Year	Title	Role	Notes	Ref.
2021	Eternals	Bollywood dancer		
2022	The Talents	Bekkie	Short film	
2022	Class S	Cherry		
2024	How to Date Billy Walsh	Amelia Brown		
2024	Maya: Birth of a Superhero	Teen Maya	Short film	
2025	Fight or Flight	Isha Mandhal / the Ghost		
2025	Christmas Karma	Bea Fernandez		

=== Television ===
Year	Title	Role	Notes	Ref.
2021	Alex Rider	Sabina Pleasure	Main role (season 2)	
2022	Bridgerton	Edwina Sharma	Main role (season 2)	
2023	Star Wars: Visions	Annisoukaline "Anni" Kalfus	Voice role; Episode: "I Am Your Mother"	
2024	Dune: Prophecy	Young Francesca	Recurring role	
2026–present	One Piece	Nefertari Vivi / Miss Wednesday	Main role (seasons 2–3)	
2026	Lego One Piece	Nefertari Vivi / Miss Wednesday	Main voice role	
TBA	Pillow Talk	Stella	Main role; web series	
TBA	Song of the Sun God	Leela	Main role; associate producer	
TBA	Arzu	Arzu	Lead role	

=== Audio ===
Year	Title	Role	Notes	Ref.
2022	Meet Cute	Mia	Podcast series; 6 episodes	
2022	Camille	Camille	BBC Radio 3	
2022	A Mid-Semester Night's Dream	Mia	Podcast series	
2025	The Death and Life of River Song; Series 03: The Dissolution of Time	Anne Boleyn	Audio drama	

=== Music video ===
Year	Title	Artist(s)	Ref.
2023	"Mosquito"	PinkPantheress	

=== Theatre ===
Year	Title	Role	Director	Venue	Notes	Ref.
2024	Instructions for a Teenage Armageddon	Girl	Georgie Staight	Garrick Theatre		

== Awards and nominations ==
Year	Award	Category	Work	Result	Ref.
2022	National Television Awards	Rising Star	Bridgerton	Nominated	
2022	Glamour Awards	Rising Star	Bridgerton	Won	
