= Jacob Gibson =

American actor (born 1996)

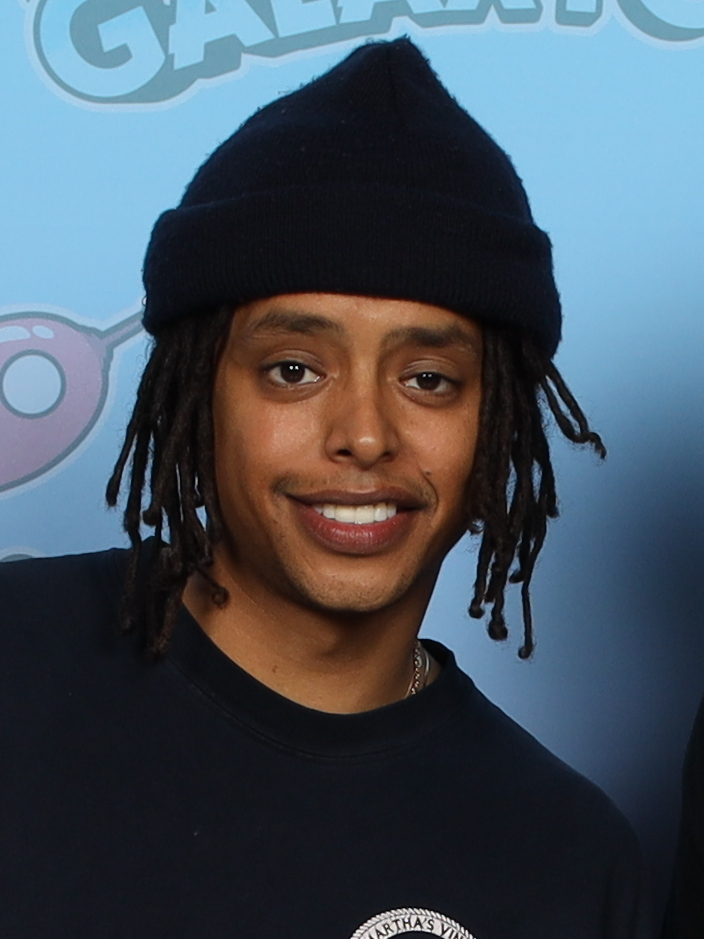
- Gibson at GalaxyCon Richmond in 2024
- Born: Jacob Romero Gibson; July 11, 1996 (age 30); Denver, Colorado, U.S.
- Education: California Institute of the Arts (BFA)
- Occupation: Actor
- Years active: 2018–present

Jacob Romero Gibson (born July 11, 1996) is an American actor. He is known for playing the role of Usopp in the Netflix series One Piece (2023).

== Career ==
Gibson graduated with a BFA in Acting from the California Institute of the Arts in 2015.

He starred as Emmett Till in The Carolyn Bryant Project, a two-person stage work created by Nataki Garrett and Andrea LeBlanc that re-examines the 1955 encounter between Till and Carolyn Bryant. The production premiered at REDCAT in 2018 and received a New York Times Critic's Pick designation during its 2020 online streaming run.

From 2019 to 2020, he played the role of AJ Delajae in a total of 15 episodes of the television series Greenleaf.

Beginning in 2023, he played the role of Usopp in the Netflix series One Piece, based on the manga of the same name.

== Filmography ==
=== Film ===
Year	Title	Role	Note
2020	Snake Eyes: An ASMR Nightmare Experience	Gabriel	

=== Television ===
Year	Title	Role	Note
2018	The Resident	Atiba Jackson	1 episode
2019	All Rise	Dylan Frank	1 episode
2019	Grey's Anatomy	Josh	1 episode
2019–20	Greenleaf	AJ Delajae	15 episodes
2023	Rap Sh!t	Lord AK	3 episodes
2023–present	One Piece	Usopp	Main role
2026	Lego One Piece	Usopp	Main role

=== Theatre ===
Year	Title	Role	Note
2020	The Carolyn Bryant Project	Emmett Till	
