= Usopp =

Fictional character

- One Piece character
- Usopp illustrated by Eiichiro Oda for the cover of Shonen Jump 2015 Issue 10
- First appearance: One Piece chapter 23: "Captain Usopp Appears" (Weekly Shōnen Jump No. 7, January 12, 1998)
- Created by: Eiichiro Oda
- Portrayed by: Jacob Romero Gibson (live-action series); Kevin Saula (live-action series; young)
- Voiced by: Kappei Yamaguchi; Sonny Strait (Funimation dub); Jason Griffith (4Kids Entertainment dub)
- Birthday: April 1

In-universe information
- Aliases: "God" Usopp (ゴッド ウソップ, God Usoppu) "Sogeking, the King of Snipers" (狙撃の王様そげキング, Sogeki no Ō-sama Sogekingu); Long Nose
- Relatives: Yasopp (father); Banchina (mother)
- Affiliations: Straw Hat Pirates (sniper); Straw Hat Grand Fleet; Usopp Pirates (Former Captain)
- Age: 17 (debut); 19 (after the timeskip)
- Bounties: 500,000,000 (current); 200,000,000 (second); 30,000,000 (first)

Usopp (Japanese: ウソップ, Hepburn: Usoppu), also known by his titles Sogeking and "God" Usopp, is a fictional character in the One Piece franchise created by Eiichiro Oda. The character made his first appearance in the 23rd chapter of the series, which was first published in Japan in Shueisha's Weekly Shōnen Jump magazine on January 12, 1998. He is the fourth member of the Straw Hat Pirates and the third to join, serving as their sniper.

He was the fourth member to join Luffy's crew and the third officially, joining after the confrontation with Captain Kuro in Syrup village. His dream is to become a "brave warrior of the sea", like his father Yasopp, member of the Red-Haired Pirates, captained by "Red-Haired" Shanks.

Usopp is recognizable for his long nose, a reference to the fact that he tends to lie a lot. He is a gifted inventor, painter, and sculptor.^{[ch. 42, 106, 190]} In combat, he relies primarily on his slingshot to fire various kinds of ammunition with great precision, also employing trickery and a variety of other weapons, giving him a unique fighting style named "The Usopp Arsenal".^{[ch. 332]} To help the Straw Hats rescue Nico Robin, he achieves notoriety under his alter-ego "Sogeking, the King of Snipers" (狙撃の王様そげキング, Sogeki no Ō-sama Sogekingu), a hero sniper wearing a golden mask and cape.^{[ch. 435]} Usopp's declaration of war on the World Government flag is cited by fans and critics alike as one of the best moments of One Piece. Eventually, after helping the Straw Hats liberate Dressrosa from Don Quixote Doflamingo's rule, he becomes infamous as "God" Usopp (ゴッド ウソップ, Goddo Usoppu) due to freeing thousands of people from lives as slave toys, as well as light shining from above onto Usopp whilst underground as he addressed the people he freed.^{[ch. 801]}

== Creation and conception ==
In the original concept art for the Straw Hats, Usopp was labeled the Vice-Captain of the crew. Usopp is based on Pinocchio and his name refers to uso (Japanese for lie) and Aesop's Fables (mostly The Boy Who Cried Wolf). When asked by a fan what the nationalities of the members of the Straw Hat Pirates would be if One Piece was set in the real world, for Usopp Oda only replied that he would be "African".

Usopp has black hair, an abnormally long nose and usually wears a dark yellow diamond-patterned kerchief, special sniper goggles, and brown coveralls with a white sash and no shirt underneath (despite wearing a dark green shirt in Skypiea). Usopp inherited his famous nose from his mother, while the rest of his face resembles that of his father.

After the two-year timeskip, Usopp undergoes a dramatic physical transformation, becoming much more muscular and having longer hair. Usopp also dons a new hat and acquires new goggles and headphones. He develops his fighting style around the use of Pop Greens, rapidly growing seeds from the Boin Archipelago, which may be inspired by the original concept art of the crew featuring a male botanist.

=== Personality ===
Usopp is one of the most emotionally expressive of the Straw Hat Pirates, and cries or gets angry at times of emotional stress. At the beginning of the series, Usopp was a compulsive liar and easily frightened, as well as anxious and insecure. Usopp's cowardice is the result of his fear and insecurity, especially when faced with uncertainty. While Usopp is a coward by nature, he is able to put aside his fears for desperate times: despite danger, Usopp faces his fears for the sake of his friends and sometimes even people he barely knows.

=== Abilities ===
Despite not excelling in physical combat, Usopp, like his father, is known for his prodigious skill with the slingshot, almost never missing his mark, even at distances at which he can barely see the target. To attack, Usopp uses a slingshot and initially shoots various spherical projectiles which he makes himself and called "Stars". Each Star has different effects: some include explosives, smoke, fire, lead and even Tabasco. Following the visit of the Straw Hats to Skypiea, Usopp adds to his arsenal the shell-shaped Dials, artifacts that can do things such as reflect attacks, emit fire and absorb and store energy from impacts to be released later. After the two-year time skip, Usopp uses a plant-based fighting style based on plants from the Boin Archipelago, replacing most of the conventional ammunition he used previously with Pop Greens, seeds which can quickly grow into full-sized dangerous plants. He is also skilled in psychological warfare, manipulating Perona's entomophobia and Sugar's fear of his shocked face to his advantage and impressively defeating them despite it being otherwise impossible when both characters are mentally fit for combat.^{[ch. 466,758]}. He has an extremely versatile fighting style, often resorting to distracting the opponent by dragging his nails down a chalkboard, or pelting them with rotting eggs and rubber bands.

Usopp is skilled in invention and drawing. He designed the Straw Hats' iconic jolly roger and created the Clima-Tact, a weapon used by Nami for self defense. Before the Straw Hat crew acquired a shipwright, Usopp also repaired the Going Merry after it sustained damage. His attachment to the ship led to a rift between the crew and his temporary departure from the Straw Hats when it was rendered unfixable and Luffy made the decision to acquire a new ship.

=== Haki ===
Usopp awakened his Observation Haki during the climax of the Dressrosa revolt, as he was able to see auras of Luffy, Law, and Sugar, who were in the royal palace, from the old King's Plateau near the Corrida Colosseum. With this, he was able to pinpoint Sugar's location and launch a projectile resembling his shocked face, traumatizing Sugar into falling unconscious, saving those she had enslaved as toys in a successful attempt of psychological warfare!^{[ch. 758]}

=== Portrayals ===
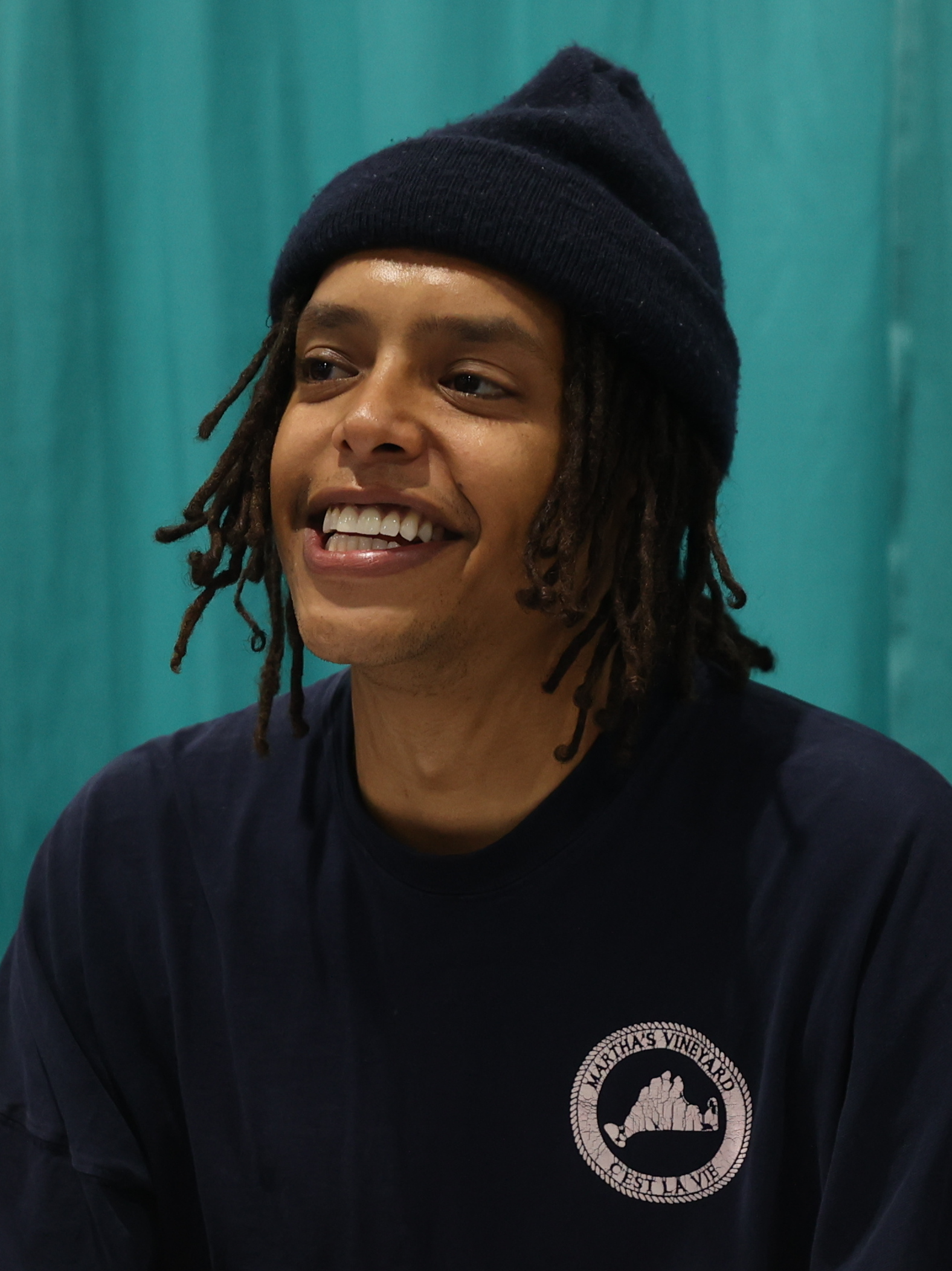
Jacob Romero Gibson portrays Usopp in the live-action series of One Piece

In the original Japanese version of the One Piece anime series and related media in the franchise, Usopp is voiced by Kappei Yamaguchi. Jason Griffith and Sonny Strait provide his voice in the 4Kids and Funimation English adaptations, respectively.

Usopp is portrayed by Jacob Romero Gibson in the live-action adaptation of One Piece. The live-action version of Usopp does not have his trademark long nose, with showrunner Steven Maeda recalling that he "felt that the nose was going to be unintentionally comical in a way that would distract from the character."

== Appearances ==
=== One Piece manga ===
Childhood and backstory

Usopp was born on April 1, to pirate Yasopp and Banchina in Syrup Village, inheriting his long nose from the latter. Usopp never saw his father again after he left to serve Red-Haired Shanks and witnessed his mother die from an illness, motivating him to lie about pirates and fantastical scenarios and cause trouble as he did to amuse his mother. He befriended three children and branded the group the "Usopp Pirates", alongside rich heiress and orphan Kaya, telling her lies of various adventures to entertain her.

East blue and Alabasta

Usopp meets Luffy and his friends when they arrive in Syrup Village. He befriends Luffy upon learning that he knows his father Yasopp through his interactions with the Red-Haired Pirates. He also learns that the butler of his friend Kaya is actually a pirate named Kuro, who is plotting to assassinate Kaya for her fortune. He warns the village of an imminent attack from Kuro's pirates, but the villagers do not believe him due to his habit of lying. Kaya, who trusts her butler completely, also rejects him. Despite this, he decides to fight the pirates to protect his village and make the incident another lie. The next morning, he fights the Black Cat Pirates with Luffy and the others, defeats the hypnotist Django and averts Kaya's assassination. He keeps the incident a secret from the village and departs with Luffy's crew on the Going Merry, a ship gifted by Kaya. After demonstrating his skill with a cannon, Usopp is granted the position of the Straw Hat Pirates' sniper.

When the Krieg Pirates attack the floating restaurant Baratie, Usopp and Zoro depart to pursue Nami, who has disappeared. They witness the devastation of the town Gosa by the Arlong Pirates, and they meet Nami's adoptive sister Nojiko in Cocoyasi Village. Usopp is captured by Arlong after saving the villager Genzo, but is saved by Nami. In the battle of Arlong Park, he faces off against Arlong's henchman Chu. He initially flees, but changes his mind and challenges Chu directly, defeating him with flaming ammunition. In Loguetown he obtains the latest model of sniper goggles. In Little Garden he meets the giant warriors Dorry and Brogy, who have been dueling for over a century, and is impressed and inspired by their pride, vowing to one day visit their homeland of Elbaf. He challenges Mr. 3 – an agent of the secret criminal company Baroque Works – who interfered with the giants' duel, and frees Zoro and his friends from Mr. 3's trap by exploiting its weakness to heat. On Drum Island, he and the princess Nefertari Vivi are nearly killed in an avalanche. He takes the rebel Dalton to Drum Castle and reunites with Luffy's crew. Before landing in Alabasta, Nami asks Usopp to create a weapon for her, and he invents the Clima-Tact. He is trapped and captured by Crocodile in his lair, but is freed by Sanji. In Alabasta's capital he encounters Mr. 2, who defeats him and steals his goggles. After explaining the situation to Sanji, he joins Tony Tony Chopper in an arduous fight against Mr. 4's team, in which they are victorious.

Skypiea and Long Ring Long Land

On Sky Island, Usopp works with Luffy and Sanji to rescue Nami and the others, who had been taken to a sacrificial altar, and they engage in combat against the priest Satori. That night, Usopp witnesses a mysterious figure repairing the Going Merry, which had been damaged in an attack by the priest Shura. The next morning, Usopp remains on the ship as part of an escape team, but is defeated by Enel. After regaining consciousness, Usopp and Sanji secretly sabotage Enel's ship and rescue Nami. In the "Davy Back Fight" against the Foxy Pirates, he participates in the "Donut Race" with Nami and Robin. Although Usopp's performance grants them a great distance, they are hindered by Foxy's ability and lose the race.

Water 7 and Enies Lobby

In Water 7, when the repair funds for the Going Merry are stolen by the Franky Family demolition company, Usopp goes to face them alone, but is beaten. He apologizes to his comrades, but Luffy discloses his decision to part ways with the irreparable Going Merry. In defense of the ship's dignity, Usopp unsuccessfully fights Luffy in a duel and leaves the Straw Hat Pirates. He and Franky are captured by the World Government's CP9 unit and are put on a train bound for Enies Lobby, but are freed by Sanji, who had snuck onboard. After learning that Robin had been captured by CP9, Usopp departs and returns as the masked figure "King of Snipers Sogeking" (狙撃の王様, Sogeki no Ō-sama; renamed "Sniper King" in the Viz Media manga translation), who joins in the rescue of Robin. As Sanji and Franky fight the guards on the train, Sogeking's attempt to rescue Robin is thwarted by her refusal.

At Enies Lobby, Sogeking encounters the giant gatekeeper Oimo and tells him of Dorry and Brogy's situation, which leads him and his friend Kashii to rebel, as they were fed lies that Dorry and Brogy were dead to make them docile. At the Tower of Justice, Sogeking shoots down the World Government flag on Luffy's order, shocking the Navy. He is then defeated by CP9's Jabra, but snipes at Spandam to prevent Robin's capture and delivers a key he received from Zoro, greatly contributing to Robin's rescue. During Luffy's battle with Rob Lucci, Usopp removes his mask and boosts Luffy's resolve with his words. Usopp watches the funeral of the Going Merry with the Straw Hats under his Sogeking persona. When Luffy and his crew return to Water 7 and are about to depart, Usopp initially tries to rejoin the crew without resolving the matter, but ultimately admits his mistaken stubbornness and apologizes, thus reconciling with Luffy and rejoining the Straw Hat Pirates. Following the Enies Lobby incident, a bounty is placed on Sogeking. ^{[ch. 435]}

Thriller Bark

At Thriller Bark, Usopp lands with Nami and Chopper and they learn the secret of the zombies in Hogback's mansion. They wander the mansion while fleeing from the zombies and meet up with Franky and Robin. When Usopp confronts Perona, her power has no effect on him as he is "always negative", which greatly shocks her. He struggles against Perona's servant Kumashi, but by repeatedly asking himself questions as Sogeking, he is able to determine Perona's weakness and defeat her. Afterward, he and the crew defeat the giant zombie Oars.#

Timeskip

When the crew is separated, Usopp lands on the Greenstone island, where he improves his skills for two years under the training of a humanoid beetle named Heracles until he reunites with the crew. Here he develops his new fighting style centred around the use of Pop Greens.

Dressrosa

On the island of Dressrosa, Usopp liberates a ground of enslaved toys, earning himself a temporary bounty of 500,000,000 by Doflamingo. This later becomes a permanent bounty of 200,000,000 and the new epithet "God" Usopp (ゴッド ウソップ, Goddo Usoppu).^{[ch. 801]} Usopp also saves Luffy and Trafalgar D. Water Law from Sugar, one of Doflamingo's top executives, by sniping her with a model of his own screaming face from a large distance.

=== In other media ===
Usopp has made several appearances in other media, including, but not limited to, every One Piece licensed electronic video game to date. He is also a support character in Jump Super Stars. In 2006, he is featured in the Dragon Ball/One Piece/Naruto crossover game Battle Stadium D.O.N. as a playable character.

== Reception ==
Usopp ranked in the Top 10 of the first three Shōnen Jump character popularity polls. In the fourth through seventh popularity polls, Usopp was ranked among the Top 15 most popular characters. Usopp was also prominently involved in six out of the ten most heartbreaking scenes in the manga: the Going Merry's funeral, Robin saying she wants to live, the Straw Hats departing from Alabasta, the Going Merry rescuing the Straw Hats, the story of Usopp's mother's death, and Usopp begging Luffy to rejoin the crew.

In a 2007 Oricon poll, Usopp was voted the 10th most wanted character to receive a spin off amongst all respondents, and the 5th most popular amongst males. In a review of Funimation Entertainment's second DVD release for Mania Entertainment, Bryce Coulter notes that Usopp "brings lots of comic relief to the series", but also comments that he "can be downright annoying at times."

Sean Cubillas of Screen Rant wrote, "As the Straw Hats' resident comic relief, Usopp has made the fans laugh for several years. Whether it's intentional or with his reluctant cowardice, Usopp has had some of the most unique interactions in the story. However, his most iconic scene to date is one that's played totally straight. Adorned as the incredible Sniper King, he's asked by Luffy to declare war on the world itself. Raising his slingshot up high, Sniper King shoots down the World Government's flag in a fiery blaze that turns it to ashes and lights up the whole sky. With just a slingshot, Usopp managed to hit fans pretty deep." In another article, Cubillas stated, "More fiction than fighter, Usopp has skirted his way through the series with tales so detailed and grand that he often uses them to trick his enemies. However, he always saves his best lies for his crew, as he realizes any adventure with Monkey D. Luffy could spell disaster for him. So, like a lot of kids trying to get out of middle school gym, Usopp turns to the doctors' notes. If Usopp doesn't want to go somewhere or if he doesn't want to leave the shop, he'll always say he has some sort of disease, like the fan favorite "Can't-Get-On-This-Island-Disease."

Christian Markle of Comic Book Resources stated that Usopp has had the best character development of the Straw Hats due to his transition from cowardice to dependability and noted how he was the only person to temporarily leave the Straw Hats for personal reasons.

Jacob Gibson's portrayal of Usopp in the live action series has been well-received, with Lyvie Scott crediting Gibson with making "even the most mundane lines laugh-out-loud funny."

== See also ==
- Straw Hats
- List of One Piece characters
