= Emily Rudd =

American actress (born 1993)

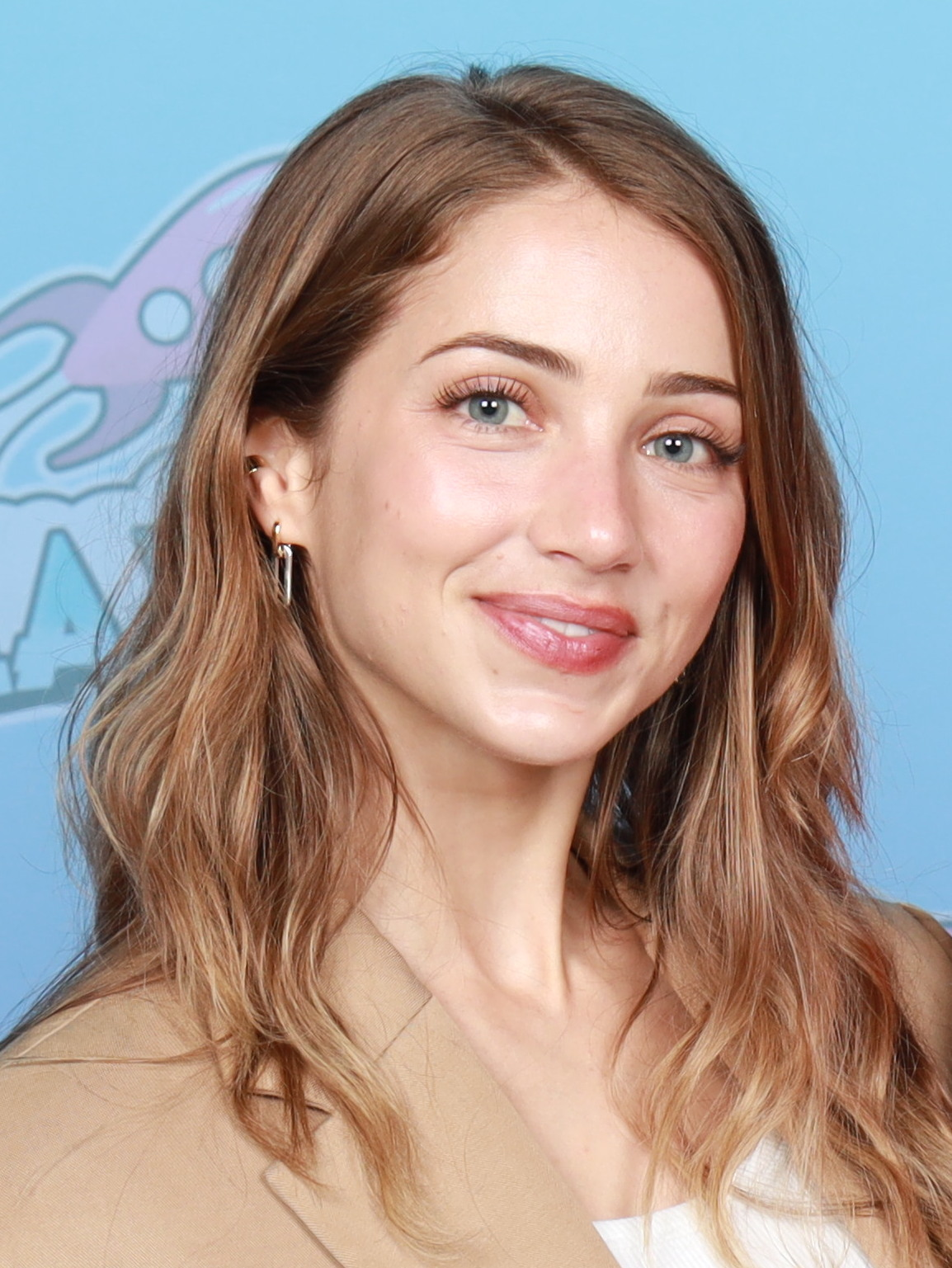
- Rudd at GalaxyCon St Louis in 2025
- Born: Emily Ellen Rudd; February 24, 1993 (age 33); Spring Valley, Wisconsin, U.S.
- Occupation: Actress
- Years active: 2013–present

Emily Ellen Rudd (born February 24, 1993) is an American actress. She is known for playing the dual roles of Cindy Berman and Abigail in the Netflix horror film series Fear Street (2021), and Nami in the Netflix series One Piece (2023-present).

== Career ==
Rudd began her career by featuring in a number of music videos and shorts, dating back to the early-mid 2010s. In 2017, she was featured in the television film Sea Change, and scored minor roles in shows such as Philip K. Dick's Electric Dreams and the Amazon anthology series The Romanoffs the following year, in 2018.

In 2021, Rudd appeared in Fear Street Part Two: 1978 and Fear Street Part Three: 1666 in the dual roles of Cindy Berman and Abigail, considered her breakthrough in film. She was also cast in a recurring role in Hunters. In 2022, she appeared in the romantic comedy science fiction film Moonshot.

In November 2021, it was announced that Rudd would play Nami in the live-action adaptation of the manga One Piece, which premiered on August 31, 2023. In 2024, Rudd began to star in anime adaptations with her role as Marcille Donato, an anxious elf mage, in the English dub of Delicious in Dungeon.

== Filmography ==
=== Film ===
Year	Title	Role	Notes
2021	Fear Street Part One: 1994	Cindy Berman	Photo
2021	Fear Street Part Two: 1978	Cindy Berman	
2021	Fear Street Part Three: 1666	Abigail / Cindy Berman	Archive footage and photo
2022	Moonshot	Ginny	
2026	Whalefall	Nan Gardiner	
2027	Crawl 2 †		

=== Television ===
Year	Title	Role	Notes
2017	Sea Change	Miranda Merchant	Television film
2018	Electric Dreams	Kim	Episode: "Safe And Sound"
2018	The Romanoffs	Ella Hopkins	Episode: "Expectation"
2020	Dynasty	Heidi	4 episodes
2023	Hunters	Clara	7 episodes
2023–present	One Piece	Nami	Main role
2024–present	Delicious in Dungeon	Marcille Donato	Voice; main role (English dub)
2026	Lego One Piece	Nami	Voice; main role

=== Short ===
Year	Title	Role	Notes
2014	Secret Santa	Girl	
2014	George R.R. Martin's Blank Page	Daenerys Targaryen	
2016	Eye for an Eye: A Séance in VR	Veronica	
2017	House Mother	Mischa	
2018	Harper Shadow	Harper Shadow	
2018	Spooky Games!	Emily	
2019	Max Dynamite	Kerry	

=== Music videos ===
Year	Title	Artist	Notes
2013	"Three Headed Woman"	Boy & Bear	
2014	"We Came to Bang"	3lau	
2015	"Can't Deny My Love"	Brandon Flowers	
2015	"I Had This Thing"	Röyksopp	
2015	"Revelator Eyes"	The Paper Kites	
2015	"Bun Up the Dance"	Dillon Francis & Skrillex	
2016	"Let Me Love You"	DJ Snake	
2018	"Touch"	3lau	
