= One Piece (2023 TV series) =

Fantasy adventure television series

- Genre: Action-adventure; Comedy-drama; Fantasy; Swashbuckler
- Based on: One Piece by Eiichiro Oda
- Developed by: Matt Owens; Steven Maeda
- Showrunners: Matt Owens; Steven Maeda; Joe Tracz; Ian Stokes
- Starring: Iñaki Godoy; Emily Rudd; Mackenyu; Jacob Romero (Note: Credited as Jacob Romero Gibson in season 1.); Taz Skylar; Vincent Regan; Jeff Ward; Morgan Davies; Charithra Chandran; Mikaela Hoover
- Music by: Sonya Belousova; Giona Ostinelli
- Country of origin: United States
- Original language: English
- No. of seasons: 2
- No. of episodes: 16

Production
- Executive producers: Matt Owens; Steven Maeda; Marty Adelstein; Becky Clements; Chris Symes; Marc Jobst; Diego Gutierrez; Tim Southam; Tetsu Fujimura; Eiichiro Oda; Joe Tracz
- Producers: Takuma Naito; Amie Horiuchi
- Production location: South Africa
- Cinematography: Nicole Hirsch Whitaker; Michael Wood; Trevor Michael Brown; George Amos; Lars Cox; Michael Swan
- Editors: Kevin D. Ross; Tessa Verfuss; Eric Litman; Tirsa Hackshaw; Adam Pearson; David C. Cook; Tim Kinzy; George Pilkinton
- Running time: 50–66 minutes
- Production companies: Kaji Productions (season 1); Tomorrow Studios; Boy Detective Inc. (season 2-present)

Original release
- Network: Netflix
- Release: August 31, 2023 – present

Related
- One Piece (1999 series)

One Piece (stylized in all caps) is a fantasy adventure television series developed by Matt Owens and Steven Maeda for Netflix. The series is a live-action adaptation of the 1997 Japanese manga series One Piece by Eiichiro Oda, who also serves as a creative consultant. It is produced by Kaji Productions and Shueisha, the manga's publisher. The series stars Iñaki Godoy, Emily Rudd, Mackenyu, Jacob Romero, Taz Skylar, and Mikaela Hoover as the Straw Hat Pirates; other members of the main cast including Morgan Davies, Vincent Regan, Jeff Ward, Charithra Chandran, Lera Abova, Joe Manganiello, and Sendhil Ramamurthy.

One Piece received a straight-to-series order in January 2020, and filming occurred between January and August 2022. The first season was released in its entirety on Netflix on August 31, 2023. Two weeks after its release, Netflix renewed the series for a second season, with scripts completed by September 2023, though filming was delayed by the SAG-AFTRA strike. The season, titled Into the Grand Line, was later filmed between June and December 2024, and it was released on March 10, 2026. In August 2025, Netflix renewed the series for a third season, which went into production in November 2025, ahead of the second season's premiere. The season, titled The Battle of Alabasta, is expected to premiere in 2027.

The series has received positive reviews from critics and fans, with praise for its performances, visuals, action sequences, humor, and faithfulness to the source material. Many critics considered the series to be one of the best live-action adaptations of a manga or anime. One Piece was the most-watched Netflix show (among individual series seasons) during the second half of 2023.

== Premise ==
The series follows the adventures of Monkey D. Luffy and the Straw Hat Pirates as they pursue their individual goals together and seek the "One Piece"; a legendary treasure found and hidden by the former "King of the Pirates", Gold Roger. But in order to achieve their goal, they must travel the seas to strange islands, avoid capture from the marines, meet new allies and fight various foes who possess unique abilities from eating Devil Fruits.

== Cast and characters ==
- Iñaki Godoy as Monkey D. Luffy, a young pirate bestowed with the power of stretching by eating the Gum-Gum Fruit. His goal is to always live free, find the One Piece and become the next King of the Pirates.
  - Colton Osorio as young Luffy
- Emily Rudd as Nami, an expert cartographer and burglar. She joins the Straw Hat Pirates as their navigator to follow her dream of drawing a complete map of the world.
  - Lily Fisher as young Nami
  - Sophie Ellenbogen as toddler Nami
- Mackenyu Maeda as Roronoa Zoro, a great swordsman and ex-bounty hunter who becomes Luffy's first mate shortly after their first encounter. He utilizes an unorthodox "Three Swords Style". Zoro trains regularly to become the world's greatest swordsman.
  - Maximilian Lee Piazza as young Zoro
- Jacob Romero as Usopp, a boisterous marksman, master storyteller and estranged son of an infamous pirate. Usopp values fame and loyalty as he aspires to be a brave warrior of sea.
  - Kevin Saula as young Usopp
- Taz Skylar as Sanji, a charming master chef and martial artist who protects his hands by utilizing only his legs for fighting. He is searching for the All Blue, a mythical connection point of the Four Seas.
  - Christian Convery as young Sanji
- Vincent Regan as Monkey D. Garp (season 1, guest season 2), a Marine Vice Admiral and Luffy's estranged grandfather. While he shares Luffy's value of freedom, he also believes that the Marines are the only ones capable of maintaining world order.
- Jeff Ward as Buggy the Clown (season 1, guest season 2), the circus-themed captain of the Buggy Pirates. Buggy has the power to split his body into pieces and control each part remotely due to eating the Chop-Chop Fruit.
- Morgan Davies as Koby (season 1, guest season 2), a cabin boy of the Alvida Pirates, until Luffy saves him from Alvida's tyranny, thus being able to pursue his dream of becoming a Marine.
- Charithra Chandran as Nefertari Vivi / Miss Wednesday (season 2–present), the princess of the desert kingdom Alabasta. She first encounters the Straw Hats undercover as a frontier agent of Baroque Works.
  - Aroop Shergill as young Vivi
- Mikaela Hoover as the voice and facial capture of Tony Tony Chopper (season 2–present), a reindeer capable of walking and talking like humans after consuming the Human-Human Fruit, who studies as a medical practitioner.
  - N'kone Mametja serves as Chopper's On Set Proxy
  - Gavin Gomes as Heavy Point Chopper
- Lera Abova as Nico Robin / Miss All-Sunday (season 3, recurring season 2), the second in command of Baroque Works. Her Flower-Flower Fruit allows her to duplicate her limbs.
- Joe Manganiello as Sir Crocodile / Mr. 0 (season 3, guest season 2), the head of Baroque Works and one of the Seven Warlords of the Sea whose Sand-Sand Fruit ability enables him to generate, control, and become sand
- Sendhil Ramamurthy as Nefertari Cobra (season 3, guest season 2), the king of Alabasta and the patriarch of the Nefertari family

== Episodes ==
Season	Season title	Episodes	Originally released
1	—	8	August 31, 2023
2	Into the Grand Line	8	March 10, 2026
3	The Battle of Alabasta	TBA	2027

=== Season 1 (2023) ===
No. overall	No. in season	Title	Directed by	Written by	Original release date
1	1	"Romance Dawn"	Marc Jobst	Teleplay by : Matt Owens & Steven Maeda	August 31, 2023
2	2	"The Man in the Straw Hat"	Marc Jobst	Ian Stokes	August 31, 2023
3	3	"Tell No Tales"	Emma Sullivan	Matt Owens & Damani Johnson	August 31, 2023
4	4	"The Pirates Are Coming"	Emma Sullivan	Tiffany Greshler and Tom Hyndman	August 31, 2023
5	5	"Eat at Baratie!"	Tim Southam	Laura Jacqmin	August 31, 2023
6	6	"The Chef and the Chore Boy"	Tim Southam	Steven Maeda and Diego Gutierrez	August 31, 2023
7	7	"The Girl with the Sawfish Tattoo"	Josef Kubota Wladyka	Tiffany Greshler & Ian Stokes and Allison Weintraub & Lindsay Gelfand	August 31, 2023
8	8	"Worst in the East"	Josef Kubota Wladyka	Matt Owens and Steven Maeda	August 31, 2023

=== Season 2: Into the Grand Line (2026) ===
No. overall	No. in season	Title	Directed by	Written by	Original release date
9	1	"The Beginning and the End"	Emma Sullivan	Matt Owens & Ian Stokes	March 10, 2026
10	2	"Good Whale Hunting"	Emma Sullivan	Ashley Wigfield	March 10, 2026
11	3	"Whisky Business"	Josef Kubota Wladyka	Tom Hyndman	March 10, 2026
12	4	"Big Trouble in Little Garden"	Christoph Schrewe	Lindsay Gelfand & Allison Weintraub	March 10, 2026
13	5	"Wax On, Wax Off"	Christoph Schrewe	Joe Tracz	March 10, 2026
14	6	"Nami Deerest"	Lukas Ettlin	Alex Regnery	March 10, 2026
15	7	"Reindeer Shames"	Lukas Ettlin	Elizabeth Hunter	March 10, 2026
16	8	"Deer and Loathing in Drum Kingdom"	Lukas Ettlin	Matt Owens & Ian Stokes	March 10, 2026

=== Season 3: The Battle of Alabasta (2027) ===
No. overall	No. in season	Title	Directed by	Written by	Original release date
17	1	"Where There's Smoke"	Christoph Schrewe	Ashley Wigfield	2027

== Production ==
=== Development ===
In July 2017, Weekly Shōnen Jump editor-in-chief Hiroyuki Nakano announced that Tomorrow Studios (a partnership between Marty Adelstein and ITV Studios) and Shueisha would commence production of an American live-action television adaptation of Eiichiro Oda's One Piece manga series as part of the series' 20th anniversary celebrations. Oda was set to serve as executive producer alongside Marty Adelstein and Becky Clements. The series was planned to begin with the East Blue saga and was noted for its high production ambitions.

In January 2020, it was revealed that Netflix had ordered a 10-episode first season. Production was delayed due to the COVID-19 pandemic, though scripts were already completed. In 2021, production resumed under the codename Project Roger, Steven Maeda and Matt Owens were serving as co-showrunners.

In 2023, Netflix confirmed a second season development, though production was delayed due to the 2023 SAG-AFTRA strike. A second season was officially announced on September 14, 2023. A third season was officially announced in August 2025, with series writer Ian Stokes serving as co-showrunner alongside Tracz.

==== Changes from the manga ====
There were a couple of things that took some persuading. And if there was something that Oda-san was really, really unhappy with, we found a way to change it. But there were some things that we tried and got into the show that initially, he was a little gun shy about. One of those was [that] we've structurally moved a couple things up that don't happen until much later chapters.

— Steven Maeda, September 2023 interview with Screen Rant

In a July 2023 open letter, Oda stated that there were numerous scenes he felt "weren't good enough to put out into the world", so the film crew re-shot them. Oda also felt some of Luffy's lines did not feel like the character on paper; however, he changed his opinion after seeing Godoy's performance of them. In an interview with The New York Times, Oda highlighted that the live-action show has more dialogue than the manga as the latter needs more space for illustrations. When asked if he was worried about the One Piece adaptation, given that other similar adaptations have been unsuccessful, Oda said, "thankfully, Netflix agreed that they wouldn't go out with the show until I agreed it was satisfactory. I read the scripts, gave notes and acted as a guard dog to ensure the material was being adapted in the correct way". Costume designer Diana Cilliers was directly influenced by Oda's Color Walk compendiums when creating the show's designs. She made minor changes to the original designs to either "spice up scenes with variation" or to address safety concerns during live-action filming.

The adaptation made several structural changes with Oda's approval, such as focusing on Garp and revealing his connection to Luffy much earlier as well as moving Arlong's introduction up and swapping him with Don Krieg's storyline. Maeda commented that they wanted to make Arlong the season's "big bad" and by introducing him at the Baratie they were able to "ramp up towards the last two episodes". He also stated that they wanted Garp as "a more present character" along with the immediate Marine pursuit of the Straw Hats crew "to keep the stakes up and let it feel like it wasn't just a fun adventure where we were meeting different antagonists and different villains and pirates, but there was an actual kind of organized presence and fearsome presence that was behind Luffy and pursuing". Polygon highlighted that increased focus on the Marines means "Koby goes from being a side character to a supporting one immediately" and "changes the framing" of the Marines.

=== Casting ===
In November 2021, the main cast portraying the Straw Hat Pirates was revealed via a series of wanted posters: Iñaki Godoy as Monkey D. Luffy, Mackenyu as Roronoa Zoro, Emily Rudd as Nami, Jacob Romero Gibson (Note: Credited on screen as Jacob Romero from season 2 onwards.) as Usopp, and Taz Skylar as Sanji. Additional supporting cast for the first season includes Morgan Davies as Koby, Ilia Isorelýs Paulino as Alvida, Aidan Scott as Helmeppo, Jeff Ward as Buggy, McKinley Belcher III as Arlong, Vincent Regan as Garp and Peter Gadiot as Shanks.

New cast members for the second season include Callum Kerr as Smoker, Julia Rehwald as Tashigi, David Dastmalchian as Mr. 3, Joe Manganiello as Mr. 0 and Lera Abova as Miss All Sunday. Other notable additions include Katey Sagal as Dr. Kureha, Mark Harelik as Dr. Hiriluk, Sendhil Ramamurthy as Nefertari Cobra, and Charithra Chandran as Miss Wednesday. Mikaela Hoover voices Tony Tony Chopper.

Manganiello, Abova, Ramamurthy, and Hoover were promoted to main cast for the third season. New cast members for the season include Cole Escola as Bon Clay, Xolo Maridueña as Portgas D. Ace, Awdo Awdo as Mr. 1, and Daisy Head as Miss Doublefinger.

=== Filming ===
Principal photography began on January 31, 2022, in Cape Town Film Studios and ended on August 22, 2022.

Filming for the second season began on July 1, 2024, in South Africa and wrapped on December 15, 2024.

Filming for the third season began on November 24, 2025, and wrapped on June 30, 2026.

=== Music ===
Sonya Belousova and Giona Ostinelli composed the series score.

The soundtrack includes singles such as "Wealth Fame Power" and "My Sails Are Set" featuring Aurora.

== Release ==
The first season of One Piece, consisting of eight episodes, premiered on Netflix on August 31, 2023. The second season was released on March 10, 2026. Like the first season, it consists of eight episodes and adapted several arcs from the original manga. The third season was confirmed for a 2027 release window.

=== Marketing ===
On June 17, 2023, the series' premiere date and teaser trailer were revealed by the main cast in-person during the fourth edition of Tudum at Ibirapuera Park in São Paulo, Brazil. The presentation took place at the Ibirapuera Auditorium for an audience of 11,000 people, and was streamed live on Netflix's official YouTube channels to 78 million viewers. The three-day event was held between June 16 and 18 and featured a One Piece-themed immersive experience, which displayed a life-size replica of the pirateship Going Merry at the Pavilhão Ciccillo Matarazzo, located inside the park. On June 29, 2023, a promotional website for the series was launched. Billed as the "Straw Hat Grand Fleet", the website features behind-the-scenes content as well as a section for creating custom wanted posters. On July 21, 2023, Netflix released the official trailer and a personalized letter from Oda.

On August 10, 2023, Netflix announced dates and locations for global fan celebrations ahead of the series premiere. Marketed as "Straw Hats Unite Across The Globe", the schedule of events included screenings of the first episode on August 24 in Santa Monica, California at the Santa Monica Pier. Other cities and dates where in-person fan celebrations were held included Paris, on August 29; Jakarta, Tokyo, Milan and Manila, on August 30; and Mexico City, Rio de Janeiro and Bangkok, on August 31. Germany was also set to hold a fan event on the premiere day, albeit virtually. Among the attractions announced for the global celebrations was a life-size replica of the Going Merry displayed at Copacabana Beach from August 31 to September 10. On August 30, 2023, Netflix released the final trailer for the series.

Cards were being given away in a promotion for the second season of the series at college basketball games starting at Rutgers University on January 23, 2026, and continuing for three games each there, as well as at Gonzaga University, St. John's University, University of Houston, and University of Illinois. Every attendee received a card at the first of three games, which scalpers attempted to buy to resell. After the second giveaway at Rutgers on January 27, an unknown burglar or burglars broke into the building and stole the remaining cards from a locked office that night.

==== Merchandise ====
On February 18, 2025, Netflix appointed Moose Toys as the global master toy licensee for the series. The deal covers all territories including Japan, which is licensed out to Bandai for several toys.

== Related media ==
=== One Piece: The Official Podcast (2026) ===
One Piece: The Official Podcast is a six-episode podcast series, each episode featuring a main cast member discussing part of the second season. It was released in Netflix on March 13, 2026.

No.	Title	Original release date
1	"Loguetown featuring Iñaki Godoy and Eiichiro Oda"	March 13, 2026
Iñaki Gody interviews the creator of One Piece, Eiichiro Oda, about his opinions on the beginning of the second season.
2	"Reverse Mountain featuring Emily Rudd"	March 13, 2026
Emily Rudd interviews the series' showrunners, Joe Tracz and Ian Stokes, about the second episode of the second season, as well as to her brother Daniel Rudd about the series.
3	"Whisky Peak featuring Mackenyu"	March 13, 2026
Mackenyu interviews the series' fight choreographer, Koji Kawamoto, about the action scenes in the third episode of the second season.
4	"Little Garden Part 1 featuring Jacob Romero"	March 13, 2026
Jacob Romero interviews actor Brendan Sean Murray and director Christoph Schrewe about the events in Little Garden in the second season.
5	"Little Garden Part 2 featuring Taz Skylar"	March 13, 2026
Taz Skylar interviews the fight choreographer, as well as his double during the first season, Stuart Williamson, the trainer Matt Esof, and the stunt performer Luis Felipe Dorasteri.
6	"Drum Island featuring Charithra Chandran and Mikaela Hoover"	March 13, 2026
Charithra Chandran interviews Mikaela Hoover, N'kone Mametja, and Gavin Gomes about their performances as Chopper in the second season.

=== One Piece Bonus Content (2026) ===
One Piece Bonus Content is a series made up of short episodes revealing production details about the show. It was released with five in Netflix on March 13, 2026. Together with Lego One Piece, a second season of two episodes was released.

No. overall	No. in season	Title	Original release date
Season 1
1	1	"Expanding the World"	March 13, 2026
The actors and crew of the series talk about the new settings for the second season.
2	2	"Bringing Chopper to Life"	March 13, 2026
It is shown a behind-the-scenes look at Mikaela Hoover, N'kone Mametja, Gavin Gomes's performances as Chopper.
3	3	"Baroque Works Explainer"	March 13, 2026
A review is made of the Baroque Works organization and its members.
4	4	"Behind the Stunts"	March 13, 2026
The actors and crew of the series talk about the action scenes in the second season.
5	5	"Iñaki Godoy Interviews Mr. Oda"	March 13, 2026
Iñaki Godoy meets with Eiichiro Oda to interview him about the series.
Season 2
6	1	"Cast Unboxing"	September 29, 2026
The actors Charithra Chandran, Lera Abova, Callum Kerr, Julia Rehwald and David Dastmalchian react to the Lego sets inspired by the second season.
7	2	"Behind the Voices"	September 29, 2026
It is shown a behind-the-scenes look of the actors recording the voices of their characters for the Lego One Piece special.

=== Lego One Piece (2026) ===
Lego One Piece is a two-part animated special that adapts the first two seasons of the series in the style of Lego construction toys. It was released in Netflix on September 29, 2026.

No.	Title	Directed by	Written by	Original release date
1	"Tall Tales From the East Blue"	Chelsea Ker	Tom Hyndman	September 29, 2026
Shortly after leaving Drum Island, Usopp tells Chopper—from his own perspective—about the events that occurred from Luffy's childhood until they defeated the Arlong Pirates, with the scenes of his tale shown through Lego figures and sets.
2	"Grand Line, Grand Time"	Chelsea Ker	Tom Hyndman	September 29, 2026
Usopp continues telling Chopper what happened from Loguetown until they met him, with Chopper also joining in the narration of the events on Drum Island. After finishing the story, they are called by Nami, who informs them that they are about to arrive in Alabasta.

== Reception ==
=== Critical response ===
Critical response of One Piece
Season	Rotten Tomatoes	Metacritic
1	86% (64 reviews)	67 (22 reviews)
2	100% (30 reviews)	80 (8 reviews)

For the first season, On the review aggregator website Rotten Tomatoes, 86% of 64 critics' reviews are positive, with an average rating of 7.8/10. The website's consensus reads: "One Piece captures the essence of its beloved source material with a charmingly big-hearted adaptation that should entertain longtime fans as well as patient newcomers." It also received a 95% audience approval rating on Rotten Tomatoes based on over 10,000 reviews. Metacritic, which uses a weighted average, assigned the first season a score of 67 out of 100, based on 22 critics, indicating "generally favorable reviews".

Second season: On the review aggregator website Rotten Tomatoes, 100% of 30 critics' reviews are positive, with an average rating of 8.6/10. The website's consensus reads: "One Piece season two offers higher stakes, a larger scope, and plenty of adventure without buckling under the pressure of being a near perfect live-action adaptation." Metacritic, which uses a weighted average, assigned the second season a score of 80 out of 100, based on 8 critics, indicating "generally favorable reviews".

=== Viewership ===
One Piece topped the weekly global Netflix chart from August 28 to September 3, ranking among the top 10 in 93 countries and at number one in 46 countries, with 140 million hours watched by 18.5 million viewers in its first week. The series ended the year as the most-watched Netflix show (among individual series seasons) during the second half of 2023, with 541.9 million hours watched by 71.6 million viewers in four months.

The second season debuted with 16.8 million viewers in its first four days, with 136.2 million hours. It debuted at number 1 on the weekly global Netflix chart, having topped the Netflix charts in 43 countries. It also led to renewed interest in the first season, which returned to the global Netflix top ten chart at number 7, with 3.6 million viewers.

=== Awards and accolades ===
Year	Organization	Category	Nominee(s)	Result	Ref(s)
2024	Make-Up Artists & Hair Stylists Guild Awards	Children and Teen Television Programming: Best Hair Styling	Amanda Ross-McDonald, Vera Alimanova, Odette Rebok, Ermine Kirstein-Venter	Nominated	
2024	International Film Music Critics Association	Best Original Score for Television	Sonya Belousova and Giona Ostinelli	Nominated	
2024	Writers Guild of America Awards	Television: Children's Episodic, Long Form and Specials	"Romance Dawn"	Won	
2025	Children's and Family Emmy Awards	Outstanding Young Teen Series	One Piece	Nominated	
2025	Children's and Family Emmy Awards	Outstanding Children's Personality	Ian McShane	Nominated	
2025	Children's and Family Emmy Awards	Outstanding Art Direction/Set Decoration/Scenic Design for a Single Camera Program	Jonathan Hely-Hutchinson, Mark Walker, Richard Bridgland, Tom Hannam	Nominated	
2025	Children's and Family Emmy Awards	Outstanding Casting for a Live-Action Program	Jessica Caldrello, Libby Goldstein, Junie Lowry Johnson, Bonnie Rodini	Nominated	
2025	Children's and Family Emmy Awards	Outstanding Stunt Coordination for a Live Action Program	Frank Spilhaus, Darrell McLean	Won	
2025	Children's and Family Emmy Awards	Outstanding Cinematography for a Live Action Single-Camera Program	Trevor Michael Brown, Nicole Hirsch Whitaker, Michael Swan, Michael Wood	Nominated	
2025	Children's and Family Emmy Awards	Outstanding Costume Design/Styling	Hayley Carreira, Jacomina Jankowitz, Diana Cilliers	Nominated	
2025	Children's and Family Emmy Awards	Outstanding Hairstyling and Makeup	Marli Kruger, Amanda Ross-McDonald, Jaco Snyman	Nominated	
2025	Children's and Family Emmy Awards	Outstanding Music Direction and Composition for a Live Action Program	Toko Nagata, Sonya Belousova, Giona Ostinelli	Nominated	
2025	Children's and Family Emmy Awards	Outstanding Original Song for a Children's and Young Teen Program	"My Sails Are Set" – Sonya Belousova and Giona Ostinelli	Won	
2025	Children's and Family Emmy Awards	Outstanding Visual Effects for a Live Action Program	Victor Scalise, Jeremy Hattingh, Scott Ramsey, Jason Martorell Parsekian, Machon Du Toit, Michelle Huynh, Nezile Ntutha, Rhett Finch, Cynthia Ludwig and Michelangelo Tegio	Nominated	
2026	Harvey Awards	Best Adaptation from Comic Book/Graphic Novel	One Piece — Season 2	Nominated	
2026	Nickelodeon Kids' Choice Awards	Favorite Family TV Show	One Piece — Season 2	Nominated	

== Merchandising ==
In 2025, several Lego sets based on scenarios of the series' first season were released, as well as Lego BrickHeadz figures of Monkey D. Luffy and Buggy the Clown. A second wave, focused on sets based on scenarios of the second season, was released on August 1, 2026.

An art book of the series, Set Sail: The Art and Making of One Piece, focused on the behind-the-scenes of the first two seasons, was released by Viz Media on June 23, 2026.
