= Taz Skylar =

British-Spanish actor and screenwriter (born 1995)

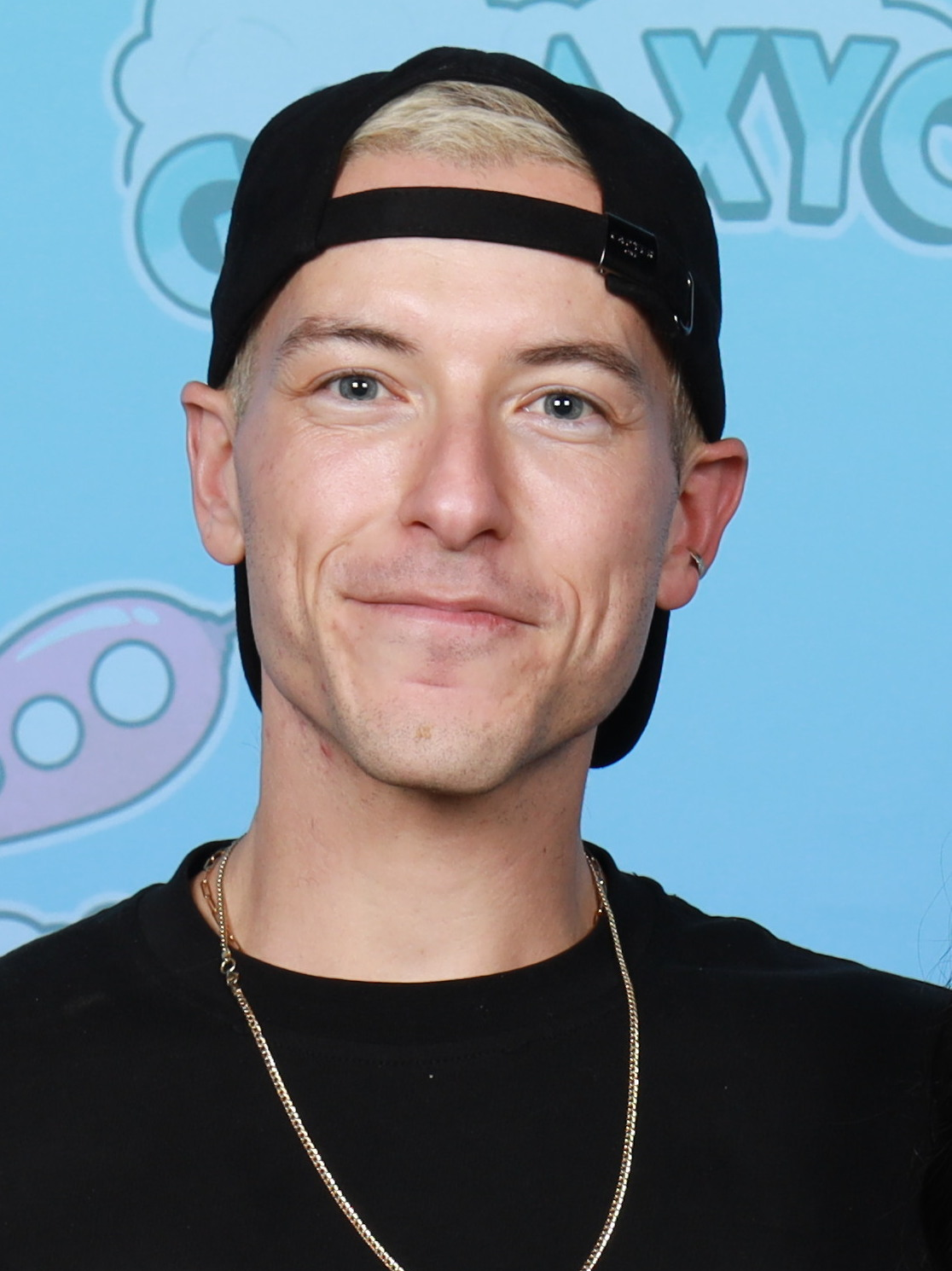
- Skylar in 2025
- Born: Tarek Yassin Skylar; 5 December 1995 (age 30); Adeje, Canary Islands, Spain
- Citizenship: United Kingdom; Spain
- Occupation: Actor
- Years active: 2015–present

Tarek Yassin Skylar (born 5 December 1995), known professionally as Taz Skylar, is a British and Spanish actor and screenwriter. After the success of his self written off-West-end play, Warheads, he went on to write and star in Gassed Up for Amazon Prime, subsequently playing Sanji in the Netflix series One Piece (2023).

== Early and personal life ==
Skylar was born in Tenerife, Canary Islands, Spain to a Lebanese father and an English mother. His father was born in Sierra Leone, and his mother came from Yorkshire. Skylar, who is fluent in Spanish, grew up in Tenerife. He holds both British and Spanish citizenship and has permanent residence in Spain.

He worked creating surfboards from the age of 15 after leaving high school. He attempted to enlist as a reservist in the British Army in 2016, but after a car accident caused him to suffer a concussion, he failed medical tests. He had to wait a year before he could reapply to join the army, so he began writing and acting.

== Career ==
Skylar began his career in the United Kingdom, where he started acting in various small roles. In 2015, he appeared in the short films Venom and Beautiful. He then played David in the short film Trophy (2016) before appearing as Caps in The Reserves from 2018 to 2019, which he also wrote and produced.

Skylar co-wrote Warheads with Ross Berkeley Simpson, inspired by the experiences of his best friend, a Spanish infantryman who suffered from PTSD after military service. Skylar also starred as the lead character Miles. The play ran at Park Theatre and was nominated for an Olivier Award in 2020.

In 2018, Skylar made his directorial debut with the short film Multi-Facial. The following year, he made his feature film debut in The Kill Team, where he played Sergeant Dawes. That year, he played Marty in Lie Low and Betim in the short film Final Gift. In 2020, he played Jason in Villain. In 2022, he joined the cast of Agatha Raisin, playing Harry Beam in two episodes of the series. Next, the actor played Gin in The Deal (2022) and appeared as Walt in an episode of The Lazarus Project (2022).

In 2021, Skylar joined the cast of One Piece and portrayed Sanji. For the role, he trained extensively in martial arts in order to perform most of his own stunts. The series released its first season in 2023, its second in 2026, and has been renewed for a third, which is currently in production.

== Filmography ==
=== Film ===
Year	Title	Role	Notes
2015	Venom	Victim	Short film
2015	Beautiful	Jasper	Short film
2016	Trophy.	David	Short film
2018	Neon	Neon	Short film
2018	Multi-Facial	Mike	Short film
2019	The Kill Team	Sergeant Dawes	
2019	Lie Low	Marty	
2019	Final Gift	Betim	Short film
2020	Villain	Jason	
2021	Boiling Point	Billy	
2021	Split Sole		Short film
2022	Dead Silent	Liam	Short film
2022	The Deal	Gin	
2023	Gassed Up	Dubz	
2025	Cleaner	Noah Santos / Lucas Vander	
2026	Monitor	Isaac	

=== Television ===
Year	Title	Role	Notes
2018–2019	The Reserves	Caps	
2022	Agatha Raisin	Harry Beam	2 episodes
2022	The Lazarus Project	Walt	2 episodes
2023	Boiling Point	Billy	4 episodes
2023–present	One Piece	Sanji	Main role; also provides Spanish dubbing
2026	Lego One Piece	Sanji	Main voice role

=== Theatre ===
Year	Title	Role	Notes
2019	Warheads	Miles	Co-writer; nominated for an Olivier Award
2019-2020	Witness for the Prosecution	Leonard Vole	Fifth cast (replacement)
2021	Hamlet	Rosencrantz / Fortinbras / Marcellus	

== Awards ==
Year	Award	Category	Nominated work(s)	Result
2018	People's Choice Award	Best Motion Picture	Multi-Facial	Won
2020	Olivier Awards	Outstanding Achievement in an Affiliate Theatre	Warheads	Nominated
