= One Piece Film: Strong World =

2009 Japanese anime film

- Theatrical release poster
- Directed by: Munehisa Sakai
- Screenplay by: Hirohiko Kamisaka
- Story by: Eiichiro Oda
- Based on: One Piece by Eiichiro Oda
- Starring: Mayumi Tanaka; Kazuya Nakai; Akemi Okamura; Kappei Yamaguchi; Hiroaki Hirata; Ikue Ohtani; Yuriko Yamaguchi; Kazuki Yao; Chō; Naoto Takenaka; Kosuke Kitajima; Aiko Kaitō
- Cinematography: Kazuhiro Yamada
- Edited by: Masahiro Gotō
- Music by: Kohei Tanaka; Shirō Hamaguchi; Yasuharu Konishi
- Production company: Toei Animation
- Distributed by: Toei Company, Ltd.
- Release date: December 12, 2009
- Running time: 115 minutes
- Country: Japan
- Language: Japanese
- Box office: $61.2 million (Note: One Piece: Film Strong World: Japan – $60,145,085; Overseas – $1,078,971)

One Piece Film: Strong World (Japanese: ワンピース フィルム ストロングワールド, Hepburn: Wan Pīsu Firumu Sutorongu Warudo) is a 2009 anime fantasy action adventure film directed by Munehisa Sakai from a screenplay by Hirohiko Kamisaka. It is the tenth feature film based on the shōnen manga series One Piece by Eiichiro Oda. The film features Naoto Takenaka (in Japanese) and Scott McNeil (in English) as Shiki, the evil captain of his crew who kidnaps Nami to force her to join his crew and intends to conquer the East Blue. Monkey D. Luffy and his crew must stop Shiki from carrying out his plans. One Piece Film: Strong World was released on 12 December 2009 and received praise for its storytelling, animation, character design, well-made fight sequences and Oda's involvement in the film.

Oda addressed the canonicity of the film in 2024, following Shiki's appearance as a member of the Roger Pirates in ongoing manga flashbacks. He stated that he does not connect the films to his manga, as doing so would make outside material effectively obligatory, and explained that he would not have given Shiki the Float-Float Fruit had he intended to use him in the manga, as he prefers to limit the number of characters capable of flight in his pirate story. Shiki's escape from Impel Down 20 years earlier and his ability to fly, depicted in Oda's bonus chapter Episode 0 alongside several members of his crew and also mentioned in the SBS of Volume 109, are referenced in Chapter 530, published in January 2009 before the film's release. The film's giant animals later appeared in the Elbaf Arc, with Oda joking that it was easier to reuse his old designs than create new ones.

== Plot ==
Shiki (シキ) uses his Devil Fruit powers to destroy marine ships and warn Monkey D. Garp and Fleet Admiral Sengoku. On a floating island, Monkey D. Luffy is chased by a genetically enhanced animal. The monster is overpowered by the other monsters before Luffy defeats the fourth monster. The rest of the Straw Hats have been separated into three groups: Sanji and Usopp; Roronoa Zoro and Tony Tony Chopper; and Nico Robin, Franky and Brook.

Meanwhile, Nami is with Shiki, who tells that she has been taken to the island against her will and a brief flashback is shown: several days earlier, the Straw Hats read news of an attack on East Blue. Luffy vows to protect the East Blue before witnessing Shiki's ship overhead. After escaping a storm, Shiki meets Nami and reveals his powers to make himself and any inanimate object he touches float. After learning it was Nami that delivered the warning, Shiki offers to take them there before abducting Nami. The others try to rescue her, but Shiki makes the pirates scatter on the island. Shiki asks Nami to become his navigator but she refuses. His minion Doctor Indigo (Dr. インディゴ, Dokutā Indigo) demonstrates an evolved bird called Billy (ビリー, Birī), who can produce electricity, but Shiki rejects it after Dr. Indigo is electrocuted. He reveals that a plant, called IQ, can cause animals to evolve instantly and to increase strength along the way.

Nami protects Billy, and the bird is left with her as Shiki and his men leave. Meanwhile, Sanji and Usopp battle various animals while Sanji searches for Robin and Nami. Meanwhile, Zoro and Chopper rescue a young girl, Xiao (シャオ, Shao), and are led to her village and are told about the large poisonous plants around the village. However, long term exposure to the plants is poisonous to humans, and the girl's grandmother has become ill by it. Xiao was looking for the cure which is the IQ plant, but Shiki has stolen the IQ plants for his experiments. Sanji and Usopp learn that Shiki also takes all the men and young women to his royal palace, leaving the village with only the very young and old, before meeting up with Zoro and Chopper. Nami flees with the help of Billy, and finds the Thousand Sunny along with Luffy.

Robin's group discovers that Shiki is planning to release the animals on the island into East Blue to force the World Government's surrender and that he is planning a demonstration against a village on the floating island to show their power. The two join the others at the village, and they also learn of the plan from the village residents. Shiki confronts and defeats the Straw Hats and offers Nami to rejoin him on the condition that the Cocoyashi Village will be spared. Robin's group arrives and rejoin the rest of the crew. Xiao gives them a tone dial and they replay what appears to be Nami's farewell message to the crew but Luffy angrily leaves before the end. Meanwhile, Nami attempts to destroy the plants protecting his palace, but gets poisoned herself. Shiki traps her near the plants and heads off to meet the pirate captains gathering. While greeting them, the Straw Hats launch a preemptive strike against Shiki and his henchmen.

The group manages to defeat them while Chopper and Usopp are ordered to search for Nami. Nami is found by Billy who helps destroy the plants just as Usopp and Chopper arrive. Chopper soon realizes the only way to save Nami is to find the IQ medicine, but Shiki attempts to stop them. Luffy engages Shiki in a duel. The two find the IQ plant, but find the medicine is being held by Dr. Indigo. Zoro manages to defeat Dr. Indigo and Nami recovers. Sanji and Brook, meanwhile, witness another of Shiki's henchmen, Captain Scarlet (スカーレット隊長, Sukāretto-Taichō), attempting to kiss Robin, but Sanji defeats Scarlet. Nami, Usopp and Chopper trick Shiki into redirecting his ship to the island, forcing his crew to flee. The Straw Hats rig the palace with explosives.

Shiki refocuses his attention on the Straw Hats, but Luffy uses an electric charge made by Usopp and knocks Shiki to the ground, leaving Luffy victorious. The other Straw Hats escape with the Thousand Sunny, using Shiki's pirate sail as a parachute. Luffy is recovered by Billy while the villagers are shown flying away using the wings on their arms. The Marines capture the retreating pirates, including Shiki. As the Marines witness the islands crash into the sea, now free of Shiki's power, they spot the Thousand Sunny. However, the Straw Hats escape. Luffy later learns that Nami's message was actually a coded SOS; she asked the crew to save her. Luffy tries to listen to the end while Nami tries to take the tone dial in embarrassment, causing it to be thrown overboard.

== Voice cast ==
Character	Japanese voice actor	English voice actor
Monkey D. Luffy	Mayumi Tanaka	Colleen Clinkenbeard
Roronoa Zoro	Kazuya Nakai	Christopher R. Sabat
Nami	Akemi Okamura	Luci Christian
Usopp	Kappei Yamaguchi	Sonny Strait
Sanji	Hiroaki Hirata	Eric Vale
Tony Tony Chopper	Ikue Ohtani	Brina Palencia
Nico Robin	Yuriko Yamaguchi	Stephanie Young
Franky	Kazuki Yao	Patrick Seitz
Brook	Chō	Ian Sinclair
Monkey D. Garp	Hiroshi Naka	Brian Mathis
Sengoku	Takkou Ishimori	Ed Blaylock
Shiki the Golden Lion	Naoto Takenaka	Scott McNeil
Dr. Indigo	Ryusei Nakao	Sean Schemmel
Scarlet	Banjō Ginga	Bryan Massey
Billy	Yasuhiro Takato	Jessie James Grelle
North Island Pirate	Kōsuke Kitajima	
Xiao	Wasabi Mizuta	Lindsay Seidel
Xiao's Mother	Mika Doi	Jessica Cavanagh
Eva	Aiko Kaitō	Lauryn Clarkson
Xiao's Grandmother	Hisako Kyoda	Linda Young
Nojiko	Wakana Yamazaki	Tiffany Grant

== Production ==
Oda personally supervised the production of Strong World, created the film's original story and over 120 pages of rough drawings. Furthermore, he placed his own name on the film's credits to indicate his desire for a film that is different from its nine predecessors. The actual director of the film is Munehisa Sakai, who is also a former director of the One Piece anime television series. The Japanese rock band Mr. Children performed the film's theme song, "Fanfare". Oda had personally offered them the opportunity.

== Promotion ==
An English-language teaser trailer of 45 seconds length was shown on the Tokyo International Anime Fair in March 2009 and later placed on the official website of the One Piece franchise's anime films, when it was relaunched around July 2009. The website began streaming a 96 seconds long trailer on August 8, 2009. Yet more footage from the film was shown on the 2009 Jump Super Anime Tour and later posted on the website of Weekly Shōnen Jump.

In the 49th issue of Shueisha's Weekly Shōnen Jump, the manga anthology that has been publishing One Piece ever since the series' premiere, the magazine announced that it would publish the prequel to the film's story, depicting a confrontation between the Pirate King Gol D. Roger and Shiki the Golden Lion, which the first 1.5 million Japanese moviegoers where promised to receive in form of a One Piece manga "Volume 0", in its 53rd issue and that it will eventually be animated. The One Piece anime television series' episodes 426 through 429 formed a sub-series of special episodes depicting a prelude to the events in the film.

Commemorating the release of the 56th volume of One Piece, on November 4, 2009, almost within a week to Strong World's premiere, the Friday morning issue of the major Japanese newspaper Asahi Shimbun contained nine full-page spreads, showing One Piece characters and advertisements for Weekly Shōnen Jump. On December 10, 2009, only two days before the film's premiere, Shueisha's fashion magazine Men's Non-No released its January issue, its cover adorned by an Oda-drawn Luffy in a look by stylist Shinichi "Miter" Mita, which not only marked the first time that Oda drew the cover for a non-manga magazine, but also the first time that a manga character has been on the cover in the magazine's 24-year history. The first eight pages of the issue are occupied by photographs of models, resembling Luffy, Robin, Nami, Zoro, and Sanji, dressed in sea and pirates themed clothes. Furthermore, the issue contains interviews with Oda and Kōsuke Kitajima.

The promotions surrounding Strong World boosted the sales of the One Piece manga during the week of December 7 through 13, causing all 56 then published volumes to be listed in Oricon's Top 200 chart of weekly Japanese manga sales.

== Release ==
On December 12, 2009, Strong World opened on 188 screens throughout Japan. The first 1.5 million moviegoers received the "0th volume" of the One Piece manga series, containing a prequel story that depicts events from 20 years into the past of the One Piece world, as well as the materials Oda created for Strong World's production. After the film's success on its first weekend of showing, Toei decided to extend the offer by another million copies of the manga.

The Blu-ray + DVD Combo Pack release of the film was released on August 27, 2010.

The film has been licensed, along with the fifth season of the anime, in North America by Funimation. Funimation announced on July 3, 2013, at Anime Expo that Strong World would be released in the United States on November 19, 2013. The Region 1 release omits the ending theme, "Fanfare" by Mr. Children, due to rights issues, though it is mentioned to be the ending in both the English and Japanese credits at the end of the film. Both Blu-ray + DVD Combo Pack and the single DVD begin with a disclaimer explaining the removal of the song.

One Piece Strong World was released in France on August 24, 2011. It was the first One Piece film to be released in cinemas in France. Selecta Visión released the film in Spain on DVD and Blu-ray on November 30, 2016, featuring Japanese and Spanish audio, as well as subtitles in Spanish.

== Related media ==
Hamazaki Tatsuya adapted the film's story into a 208 pages light novel, released on December 14, 2009. An art book to the film of 120 A4 pages, published on December 18, 2009, entered to weekly Japanese comic sales ranking on place 21 with 42,076 copies sold.

== Reception ==
=== Box office ===
On its first weekend of showing, Strong World was seen 820,000 times on 188 screens throughout Japan, 103 of which had sold out over the entire weekend, resulting in a per-screen average of 5,520,000 Japanese yen (approx. 62,200 United States dollars), which is the record for a nationwide-released film in Japan, and a gross revenue of ¥1,038,000,000 (approx. $11.7 million), ¥553,000,000 (approx. $6.24 million) on the first and ¥485,000,000 (approx. $5.47M) on the second day, thus topping both Ponyo, which took in ¥1,025,000,000 (approx. $11.55 M), and Harry Potter and the Half-Blood Prince, which made ¥990,000,000 (approx. $11.2 M), on their first weekends of showing, as well as earning more than the ¥920,000,000 (approx. $11 M) its predecessor, One Piece: Episode of Chopper + Fuyu ni Saku, Kiseki no Sakura, made in its whole time of showing. Anime News Network attributes part of this success, which includes a 1st place on the Japanese and a fourth place on the international box office over the time frame December 11 through 14, to Toei's giving-away of the "One Piece Volume 0" manga.

Over the weekend of December 19 and 20, Strong World topped the Japanese box office for a second time in a row and, with $22,500,000 earned in its first eight days of showing, set a new company record for Toei, beating Aibo, the record holder from 2008, which needed two more days to reach the same amount and eventually finished with a total gross revenue of $50,000,000, a sum Toei expects Strong World to exceed by $7,000,000.

In its third week, Strong World fell to the 3rd place on Kogyo Tsushinsha's Japanese box office chart and to the 4th place on the charts of Variety and Rentrak Theatrical. Shown on 193 screens, it increased its total gross revenue by $2,576,258 to a new total of $32,238,129. In its fourth week, it fell to fourth place. Shown on 194 screens, it grossed another $2,611,102, creating a new total of $39,439,879. The film remained in fourth place during its fifth week, earning another $1,753,517 on 194 screens to a new total of $44,506,849. Falling to the 6th place on its sixth weekend, Strong World still grossed an additional $1,063,584 on 193 screens, increasing its total to $47,918,186, before falling off the Top 10 in the following week. The worldwide total box office is about $61.2 million.

=== Reviews ===
One Piece Film: Strong World received positive reviews from critics, praising the action sequences, plot, animation and Oda's involvement in the film.

Chris Beveridge of The Fandom post described the film as "a very streamlined Oda story that would have gone on for twenty or thirty episodes if it was done as a regular arc with the TV series", adding that the storyline was "predictable" but also "well polished". Beveridge also praised the film for having a stronger connection to the One Piece television series than the franchises previous films. Rebecca Silverman of Anime News Network awarded the film a 'B' rating, praising the storyline and character design. Silverman commented that "no one can come up with weird laughs or monsters quite like Oda", although unfavorably comparing some of the animation to "stop-motion animation". Silverman also commented on the English dubbing of the film, saying that Ian Sinclair's debut as Brook "does a very good job with the loopy skeleton", although she found Scott McNeil's "pseudo-Caribbean" accent as Shiki "a little off-putting". Despite being largely unfamiliar with the franchise, Kyle Mills of DVD Talk called FUNimations release "Highly Recommended", praising the "terrific cast of characters" and "giant kick ass final fight".

Jeffrey Kauffman of Blu-ray.com also recommended One Piece Film: Strong World describing it as "loud, frenetic and frequently nonsensical," but also "kind of crazily entertaining at the same time" Kauffman also added that "while Strong World won't necessarily be incomprehensible to newcomers", "those with a solid grounding in the background of the story and its many characters will reap the most rewards from this particular outing". It also currently has a rating of 7.1 out of 10 collated from both film critics and users on IMDb.

=== Awards and nominations ===
It won the award for Excellent Animation of the Year at the 34th Japan Academy Prize and is nominated for Animation of the Year.

== See also ==
- List of One Piece films
- List of One Piece media
- List of 2009 box office number-one films in Japan
