= Nico Robin =

One Piece franchise fictional character

- One Piece character
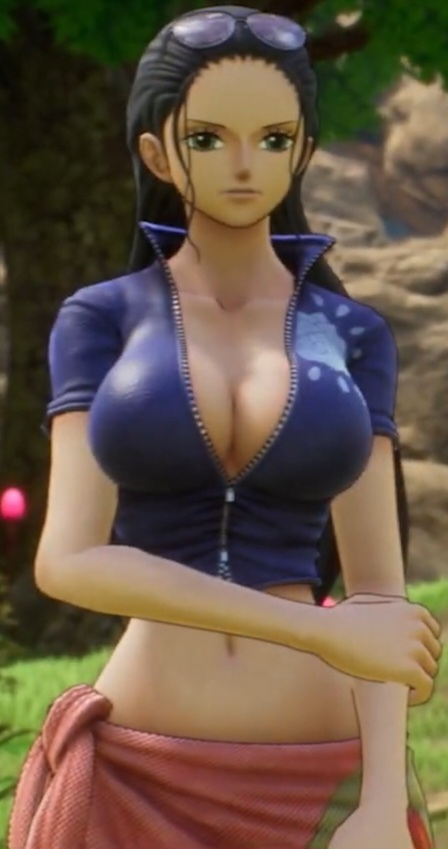
- Nico Robin as depicted in the video game One Piece Odyssey
- First appearance: One Piece chapter 114: "The Course" (Weekly Shōnen Jump No. 52, November 22, 1999)
- Created by: Eiichiro Oda
- Portrayed by: Emiya Ichikawa II (Super Kabuki II: One Piece); Lera Abova (live-action television series)
- Voiced by: Yuriko Yamaguchi; Anzu Nagai (young); Veronica Taylor (4Kids Entertainment dub); Stephanie Young (Funimation dub); Jad Saxton (young; Funimation dub)
- Birthday: February 6

In-universe information
- Full name: Nico Robin (Note: Nico Robin (ニコ・ロビン, Niko Robin))
- Aliases: Devil Child (Note: Devil Child (悪魔の子, Akuma no Ko)); Ms. All-Sunday (Note: Ms. All-Sunday (ミス・オールサンデー, Misu Ōrusandē)) (formerly)
- Relatives: Nico Olvia (Note: Nico Olvia (ニコ・オルビア, Niko Orubia)) (mother); Oran (uncle); Roji (aunt); Mizuira (cousin)
- Affiliations: Baroque Works (formerly); Revolutionary Army (formerly); Straw Hat Pirates (currently)
- Age: 28 (debut); 30 (after the timeskip)
- Devil Fruit: Flower-Flower Fruit (Hana-Hana Fruit in 4Kids dub) (Note: Flower-Flower Fruit (ハナハナの実, Hana Hana no Mi))
- Bounties: 930,000,000 (current); 130,000,000 (third); 80,000,000 (second); 79,000,000 (first)

Nico Robin (ニコ・ロビン, Niko Robin), otherwise known as "Devil Child", is a fictional character in the One Piece franchise created by Eiichiro Oda. The character made her first appearance in the 114th chapter of the series, which was first published in Japan in Shueisha's Weekly Shōnen Jump magazine on November 22, 1999.

In the series, Robin is initially introduced as an antagonist, but eventually becomes the seventh member of the Straw Hat Pirates crew and the sixth to join. Acting as the group's archaeologist and historian, Robin is a Devil Fruit user who possess the power of the Flower-Flower Fruit, allowing her to sprout replicas of her limbs, and later her entire body, from any surface. As the only survivor of the island of Ohara, Robin is the only known living person in the world of One Piece with the ability to read the ancient stones called Poneglyphs, something considered threatening by the World Government, which forbids the practice.

Robin has become extremely popular and a breakout character in anime and manga fandom. She has also appeared in several adaptations based on the manga, including the anime television series in which she is voiced by Yuriko Yamaguchi and Anzu Nagai as a child in the original Japanese language, as well as by Veronica Taylor and Stephanie Young and Jad Saxton as a child in the English versions. She has also become a popular subject of cosplay, causing a trend in Japan where women attempted to replicate her iconic costumes.

Nico Robin is portrayed by Russian actress Lera Abova in the live action adaptation of One Piece.

== Concept and creation ==
The character of Nico Robin was created by Eiichiro Oda, the author of the manga series One Piece, and she made her first appearance in its 114th chapter, titled "The Course", which was first published in Shueisha's Weekly Shōnen Jump magazine on November 22, 1999. As a fan of film director Quentin Tarantino, Oda stated that he used as a source of inspiration for Robin's design the character of Mia Wallace, played by Uma Thurman in Pulp Fiction (1994), one of Tarantino's most famous films.

She was a later addition to the story and Robin and Franky are the only crew members who did not appear in the original concept art for the Straw Hats. However, there was a male member who was a botanist, which may allude to Robin's Devil Fruit power.

=== Abilities ===
Robin ate the Flower-Flower Fruit, a Paramecia-type Devil Fruit that allows her to sprout duplicates of any of her body parts from any surface within range. The number of duplicates she can create appears to be unlimited, so long as they are within range. Usually, when she uses her powers, she crosses her arms and makes an "X" shape across her chest, though it's shown that she does not necessarily need to do so to use her abilities.

She can sprout her duplicate body parts from her own body, inanimate surfaces, and even from other people's bodies. She can even sprout duplicate body parts on top of other duplicate body parts. She maintains full control of her duplicated limbs and can perceive sights and sounds remotely through duplicate eyes and ears.

Robin can create entire clones of herself and even sprout gigantic-sized limbs.

=== Description ===
When she joined the Straw Hats, Robin was 28 years old and had a bounty of 79,000,000, which made her the oldest crew member (at the time) and the second-highest bounty bearer, junior to her captain Monkey D. Luffy (100,000,000 at the time) but senior to Roronoa Zoro (60,000,000). Her bounty has since been raised to 80,000,000 after the Enies Lobby incident, to 130,000,000 for her involvement in the defeat of Donquixote Doflamingo, and lastly to the current 930,000,000 for her involvement in the raid on Onigashima and the defeat of Kaido, as well as for her having defeated pirate Black Maria and for her knowledge of Poneglyphs. Her current bounty ranks fifth in her crew — after Luffy (3,000,000,000), Zoro (1,111,000,000), Jinbe (1,100,000,000) and Sanji (1,032,000,000) — and is their highest bounty under 1,000,000,000. Originating from West Blue, Nico Robin is a tall, slender woman with a long, thin and defined nose, shoulder-length raven black hair which she used to style in a traditional hime cut, and large brown eyes (in the manga and in One Piece Film: Strong World and in One Piece Film: Z, azure in the anime) with wide pupils. In the anime she was initially depicted with a tanned skin complexion, as opposed to the lighter one in the manga. Robin has long limbs — especially her legs — and, before timeskip, she seemed to favor dark-toned or purple outfits and a somewhat outback fashion in general, having worn cowboy hats at Arabasta, Jaya, Skypiea and Sabaody; alternatively she wore leather clothes in Long Ring Long Land and Water 7. As Ms. All-Sunday, she wore a two-pieces cowgirl purple corset and miniskirt, paired with white cowboy hat, fur-lined coat, and high-heeled boots. After timeskip, she abandoned her hime cut in favor of curtain bangs that expose her forehead, has grown her hair to lower back-length, and has lighter skin complexion in the anime too.

Robin has a somewhat macabre side to her and highlights pointing at morbid details or occasionally showing fondness for horror that disgust Usopp, Chopper and Nami, but she never does it out of malice; rather, it is a psychological defense mechanism and a direct consequence of the traumas she experienced during her childhood, and it puts no one in danger. For example, when Usopp "interviewed" her when she joined the crew, she mentioned "assassination" as her specialty, and later, her proposed name for the Straw Hats Pirates' new ship was "Little Darkness".

One Piece author Eiichiro Oda has provided background details about Nico Robin occasionally, answering fan questions. Robin was born on 6 February and is 188 cm (6 ft 2 in) tall, with blood type "S" (or "0" in AB0 system) and body measurements of 99–59–89 cm (39–23.23–35.04 in), wearing a Japanese I-cup bra size. After the timeskip, her height remained unchanged, but her body measurements have been updated to 100–60–90 (39.37–23.62–35.43 in), equivalent to Japanese J-cup bra size. If she were real, she would "smell like flowers" and she would have been of Russian nationality, while her favourite type of food is sandwiches and anything to complement coffee, including cakes as long as they are "not too sweet", and the least favourite would be chewing gum since she "can't swallow it". She sleeps 7 hours a day, from 11 pm to 6 am.

=== Dream ===
As with the case of all her crew mates, Nico Robin has a lifelong dream that boosts her and that she made the scope of her life itself: to read the Rio Poneglyph, a legendary stele containing the True History of the One Piece world, including the erased-from-records Void Century, and thus completing the lifelong research of her own mother, Nico Olvia, and her late mentor, Professor Clover. To accomplish so, she must first locate all of the thirty Poneglyphs scattered around the world and read them; of them, the four known as "Road Poneglyphs" would give pieces of informations that, put together, would lead to the last island on the Grand Line, Laugh Tale — where Gol D. Roger is rumoured to have buried his legendary treasure, the "One Piece" itself. So far, she has located and read at least the following Poneglyphs:

- a Poneglyph in an unknown location and of unknown purpose, found in a wooden area in a West Blue island in her pre-teens.
- a Poneglyph located in the Tomb of the Kings in Alubarna, which bore informations about the ancient superweapon Pluton, and which was also chased after by the Baroque Works.
- a Poneglyph located in the Great Belfry of Shandora in Skypiea, the Island in the Sky, bearing informations about another ancient superweapon, Poseidon, and also a message by the late Pirate King Gol D. Roger.
- a Poneglyph located in the Sea Forest of Fish-Men Island, bearing an apology letter by a man of the surface known as "Joy Boy".
- a Poneglyph located in the Whale Tree in the island of Zou, one of the four Road Poneglyphs.
- a Poneglyph located in the Treasure Room in Whole Cake Island, one of the four Road Poneglyphs, of which she possesses a copy.
- another Poneglyph located in the Treasure Room in Whole Cake Island, of unknown purposes and content.
- a third Poneglyph located in the Treasure Room in Whole Cake Island, of unknown purposes and content.
- a Poneglyph located in Mt. Fuji cavern in Wano Country, one of the four Road Poneglyphs, of which she possesses a copy.

She also knows the location of, but has not read, a second Poneglyph in Wano, located in the secret chamber of Kouzuki Sukiyaki's castle.

== Appearances ==
Robin as Ms. All-Sunday in the One Piece anime

=== In One Piece ===
==== Background and origins ====
Originating from the island of Ohara in the West Blue, (Note: Ohara (オハラ)) home of the world's oldest and largest library, Nico Robin was born on 6 February, twenty-eight years prior to the main events, from archaeologist Nico Olvia and an unnamed father. She was born on her mother's birthday and followed her steps, becoming an archaeologist herself at the age of eight.

While Robin's father has remained unrevealed to present, Olvia mentioned that it was her personal goal to fulfil his dream of locating and deciphering Poneglyphs — large and apparently indestructible steles inscribed in an ancient language unknown to most of modern men, which are scattered around the world and known for delivering informations about world's history not to be found in any other source. Olvia left Ohara when Robin was two years old, joining a research expedition, and only returned six years later, alone.

Robin was thus raised by Olvia's brother Oran and his wife Roji, and at some point in her childhood she found and ate the Paramecia-type Flower-Flower Devil Fruit, which allowed her to have temporary copies of parts of her body, including her eyes and ears, which spring up on surfaces near her. Behind her teachers' backs, she acquired from them the outlawed knowledge of how to translate the ancient stones called Poneglyphs, (Note: Poneglyphs (歴史の本文(ポーネグリフ), Pōnegurifu)) which are scattered around the world. She came to share their goal of finding the elusive Real Poneglyph, (Note: Real Ponegliff (真の歴史の本文(リオ・ポーネグリフ), Rio Pōnegurifu)) which is said to tell the world's lost history and especially that of the Void Century — a piece of history dating 800 years before the main events, after which the World Government came into form, and which has been erased from all Government-approved sources.

==== Ohara incident and life on the run ====
When Robin was eight years old, she met a castaway giant on Ohara's coast, Jaguar D. Saul, who informed her that he was a Vice Admiral and that the World Government had found out about Ohara's researches, and had sent a battlefleet to suppress all archaeological research, the researchers, and the library itself. On the same day, Nico Olvia returned to Ohara to carry the same information. Just later the battlefleet arrived and opened fire on Ohara, including on the evacuation ship carrying civilians by order of then-Vice Admiral Sakazuki, while Saul was frozen to apparent death by Vice Admiral Kuzan.

Robin could flee the attack as its sole survivor thanks to Kuzan's help following Saul's last wish and lived on the run for twenty years. She was given the epithets "Demon of Ohara" and "Devil Child" by the World Government, with a bounty of 79,000,000; the true reasons for the bounty remained classified and she was officially wanted for an attempt to overthrow the World Government.

==== Ms. All-Sunday, Operation Utopia, and meeting the Straw Hats ====
Left orphaned and traumatized, Robin became a wanted fugitive and unable to trust anyone as the adults she encountered sought to capture and kill her in order to hand her over the Marines, and she was forced to hide amoung various criminal organizations ranging between civilians and pirates to avoid being easily discovered, due to the exceptionally high bounty on her head, this stigma led her to believe had no right to exist. At age 8 she joined her first pirate crew and at age 23 (fifteen years after the Ohara incident), she could enter the Grand Line from her native West Blue. At the same time she pursued her archaeological researches and she managed to locate at least one Poneglyph, as still a pre-teen in the West Blue.

At age 24, one year after entering the Grand Line, she travelled to Arabasta Kingdom where she joined Sir Crocodile's crime syndicate Baroque Works, serving under codename Ms. All-Sunday as the organization's vice-president (only junior to Crocodile himself, and the only agent to actually know his true identity, as for all of the others he was known under codename Mr. 0).

Within Baroque Works, Robin/All-Sunday acted primarily as a supervisor, coordinator, and liaison agent between Mr. 0 and his subordinates. Their ultimate goal was to locate and decipher the Poneglyph hidden under Arabasta's capital city Alubarna (codenamed "Operation Utopia"), which Crocodile knew contained crucial informations for an ancient superweapon known as Pluton. Given her unique ability to read Poneglyphs, Crocodile had taken advantage of his own position as Warlord of the Sea to track down and hire Robin.

Robin first met her would-be crew mates upon infiltrating their ship and offering them a rare Eternal Pose which would have led them to a secure island, however far from Arabasta. However, Luffy refused her offer and destroyed the Eternal Pose, claiming that she had no authority over their ship's whereabouts. She was revealed by Princess Vivi as Baroque Works' vice-president, and claimed having purposefully lured Vivi to know Mr. 0's true identity.

Despite the Straw Hats taking down several of the Baroque Works agents and outing Crocodile himself, he ultimately found the Poneglyph in the dungeons of Arabasta's Tomb of the Kings but, upon reading it, Robin told him that it contained the Kingdom's annals instead of informations about Pluton, then attacked Crocodile but was easily defeated and left half-dead. Immediately after, Crocodile was faced and ultimately defeated by Monkey D. Luffy.

After the battle, Robin gave Luffy the antidote against the poison in Crocodile's hook, and asked him to be left in the collapsing Tomb of the Kings, as her wish was to finally die. However, Luffy refused to listen to Robin and — despite her protests — carried her out of the dungeon saving her life.

==== Joining the Straw Hats and visiting the Sky Island ====
Once again finding herself with nowhere to go nor to come back to, Robin infiltrated the Straw Hats' ship once again and asked to be included in the crew, claiming that by not fulfilling her wish to die, Luffy had made her an unforgivable insult and that she held him responsible for her continued existence, and for the first time she voices out her personal quest of locating the Rio Poneglyph. Despite the crew's protests (save Sanji), Luffy accepted her as the seventh member of the Straw Hats.

Robin was initially solitary and spent her time on the Going Merry mostly reading history books and being revered by Sanji, with Zoro being the only remaining crew member to still be wary of her. Shortly after Robin's inclusion, the Straw Hats arrived in the island of Jaya, and after Nami's Log Pose began pointing upwards, they used a vertical water stream known as the Knock Up Stream to travel to a legendary island in the sky, Skypiea.

Here, Robin examined the ruins of the civilization that ruled the island in the past and, most importantly, the Poneglyph located in the ancient capital city Shandora, containing informations about another ancient superweapon, Poseidon; she furthermore discovers that it also bears a message in the ancient language, but left in recent times by none other than Gol D. Roger, discouraging scholars to go further in their research. On Skypiea, the crew also faced and eventually defeated the tyrannical Eneru.

==== Long Ring Long Land, Water 7, and Enies Lobby ====
Upon returning from Skypiea, the Straw Hats stopped off at Long Ring Long Land where they briefly confronted Pirate captain Foxy and his Davy Back Fight challenge.

Immediately after, Nico Robin was tracked down by Kuzan (now serving as Admiral under codename Aokiji), who had heard of her joining a new crew and had decided to check her whereabouts in person. After initially stating that he is not on official duties and is not seeking confrontation, Aokiji changed his mind and attacked the crew, since with the addition of Nico Robin he judged them too much of a threat for the world. Thus he easily defeated Luffy, Zoro and Sanji attacking at once, and froze down Robin herself. Luffy fought Aokiji one-on-one to buy time for Zoro and Sanji to unfreeze Robin, and ended up defeated and frozen down himself. However, Aokiji spared him and the rest of the crew, choosing not to go after them since he believed Nico Robin would have betrayed and destroyed them anyway.

After the confrontation with Aokiji, the Straw Hats sailed to Water 7, a city renowned for its shipwrights, in order to have their ship repaired and potentially add a shipwright to the crew. While there, Nico Robin was approached by a masked man who simply mumbled the words "CP9" to her, and leaving her in shock. She followed the man, whom she was later seen with by Sanji. The CP9 threatened Robin with an island-destroying Buster Call should she not help them to assassinate Iceburg, the city major, steal the blueprints for the superweapon Pluton from him, which they believed were in his possession through inheritance from his late master shipwright Tom; they also threatened her to take the guilt of Iceburg's assassination and follow them to the World Government military base Enies Lobby to be executed for her crimes against the world, otherwise the agency would have attacked the Straw Hats. Upon reuniting with the crew, Robin told them about "the darkness in [her] heart" and that she was about to leave them, since she had one goal she could not reach while with the crew.

That night, CP9 and Robin raided Galley-La, the city's largest shipwright company, and tried to kill Iceburg. The assassins revealed themselves as a government secret agency. The CP9 located the blueprints in Franky's hideout, an underworld don who also had been Tom's apprentice, and stole them. After discovering her real reason for leaving and that her true goal was their safety, the Straw Hats travelled to Enies Lobby and declared an open war against the World Government just to get her back. She realized that she has finally found people who will never sell her out and becomes part of the crew, and voiced out her will to live. After defeating the CP9, the Straw Hats managed to flee back to Water 7 and have their wounds healed, but had to bid farewell to their ship since it was too damaged to sail again. However, Franky, who had fought with them at Enies Lobby, decided to build them a new ship, and expressed his personal dream that it could conquer the Grand Line. Robin was once again approached by Aokiji, who voiced out his surprise at CP9's defeat and asked Robin whether she had finally found her place to stay — to which she answered "Yes". Aokiji then left, remarking that Ohara had not been fully destroyed.

After the Enies Lobby events, Robin also learnt about Monkey D. Luffy being grandson to Vice-Admiral Monkey D. Garp, and son to none other than Monkey D. Dragon, the world's most wanted criminal and leader of a revolutionary army. She also received a new bounty of 80,000,000, a small increasement from her previous one, which she speculated was due to Aokiji's personal intervention. Before leaving Water 7, she also was instrumental in convincing Franky to join the crew.

==== Thriller Bark ====
After leaving Water 7, the Straw Hats sailed through the Florian Triangle — a sea zone perennially covered in fog — and met a ghost ship and its only sailor, pirate musician and undead skeleton Brook, whom Luffy immediately invited to join the crew. He accepted, but his casual mention of having had his shadow stolen some years before caught Robin's attention. Immediately after, the Thousand Sunny was captured by Thriller Bark, the world's largest pirate ship.

Here the Straw Hats faced the undead pirates led by Gecko Moria, one of the seven Warlords of the Sea, a pirate with the Devil Fruit ability to steal and freely manipulate people's shadows and, through them, have the shadow's owners under his control. Here Robin expressed her grimly aesthetic tastes, supporting Luffy's proposition to explore Thriller Bark since she "like[d] thrills" and finding Cerberus — a three-headed zombie dog — "cute". While exploring the island/ship, Robin was paired with Franky, with whom she fought the giant zombie spider-monkey Tararan and learnt from Brook the zombies' weak point, salt. She also teamed up with Chopper to defeat zombie surgeon and Moria's right-hand Dr. Hogback, but was robbed of her shadow by Moria.

After Luffy's victory over Moria, Robin and the rest of the crew fought and were defeated by Warlord of the Sea Bartholomew Kuma, who was sent to capture Luffy. Kuma destroyed Thriller Bark and knocked down the Straw Hats but, out of respect for the crew's loyalty to their captain, accepted Zoro's offer to move all of Luffy's pain to him, then left.

The crew threw a party with Moria's former slaves, and despite Sanji's effort to keep the crew unaware of Zoro's sacrifice, Robin managed to eavesdrop on the conversation; they spent some days on Thriller Bark to dispose of the fallen and recover from injuries, then set sail for Fish-Men Island.

==== Sabaody Archipelago, crew split, and Tequila Wolf ====
At the Sabaody Archipelago — the last islands of the first half of the Grand Line — the Straw Hats met Silvers Rayleigh, who in the past had served as Gol D. Roger's first mate. He confirmed that the Roger pirates had left the message on Shandora's Poneglyph and also that they had found the Rio Poneglyph and read the True History. Robin declined his offer to be informed of it, but was still warned by Rayleigh that they were mere pirates and lacked the scholarship to fully understand the text, and that Robin herself would probably come to different conclusions than theirs, leaving her puzzled.

Shortly after the archipelago was raided by Admiral Borsalino (codename Kizaru), who had been sent to eliminate the pirates after Luffy had punched a World Noble — a direct descendant of the World Government's founders — in the face during a slave auction. With her mates, Robin fought a Kuma-looking cyborg, before the real Kuma showed up and sent each of the crew members to separate locations scattered around the world.

Nico Robin was sent to Tequila Wolf, a country in the East Blue whose inhabitants had been enslaved 700 years prior and forced to build a seemingly endless bridge. Robin herself was captured and put to work, without being given any explanation as to why the bridge had to be built. She was later able to escape slavery by stealing keys to her handcuffs, just before the country was liberated by the Revolutionary Army.

Robin was informed via newspaper of the Marineford War, and that the bridge construction was a direct order coming from the World Nobles. She also received Luffy's message to train for the next two years, before meeting again at Sabaody. The Revolutionaries explained that they had been looking for her for ten years given her unique knowledge of Poneglyphs, and that Dragon wanted her to join the Army.

She declined the offer to be protected, but accepted to meet Dragon. However, she remained wary of the Revolutionaries, refusing to enter their ship's cabins since they had no escapes, and spending the whole journey to the Revolutionary Army's base on the deck. She also stated that for the first time that she wanted to become stronger for someone else.

Robin spent two years training with the Revolutionaries, learning to better master her Devil Fruit powers and also fundamentals of Fish-Man Karate, which she implemented in her sprouted limbs to deliver stronger hits. Robin honed her Flower-Flower Fruit powers to the point where she could create full-bodied duplicates of herself and even wings made of arms and hands, allowing her to fly. She was also given a new epithet, "Light of the Revolution".

==== Reunion and Fish-Man Island ====
Robin was the eighth Straw Hat member to return to Sabaody, doing so secretly in order to lose World Government agents chasing after her. She reunited with Franky, Nami, Usopp and Chopper at Sabaody's Grove 17, and after the whole crew reunited, they set sail for the underwater Fish-Man Island taking on significantly more active role in both combat and historical investigation. While exlpring the Sea Forest, the archaelogist decipthers a Poneglyph containing an apology letter from the historical figure Joy Boy to the ancient Mermaid Princess Poseidon, later learning from King Neptune that Princess Shirahoshi is Poseidon's modern incarnation one the three Ancient Weapons. During the battle at Gyoncorde Plaza, she demonstrates the growth of her Devil Fruit powers by effortlessly defeating Hammond and freeing the island's enslaved human pirates.

==== Punk Hazard, Dressrosa and Zou ====
Eterning the New World, Robin arrives on Punk Hazard, where she helps rescue kidnapped children from Caesar Clown's research facility. assists in subduing hid subordinates, and plays a key role in coordinating the nella formed pirate allience with Trafalgar Law.

Arrives in Dressrosa, Robin works alongside Usopp and the dwarves of Tontatta Tribe to execute Operation SOP, infiltrating the underground port liberate the kingdom's enslaved citizens from Sugar's abilities. During the subsequent conflit against the Donquixote Pirates, she prioritizes protecting her allies over self-preservation, positioning herself as a shield to defend Rebecca from Diamante's lethal attacks on Flower Hill so that Kyros can defeat him without distraction.

Traveling onward to Zou, Robin reunites the Mink Tribe and deciphers the first Road Poneglyph inside the Whale Tree, reavealing that four such stones are required to Laugh Tale. Although Inuarashi and Nekomamushi warn her that Four Emperors and other world powers will inevitably target her for her unique ability to read the acient script, Robin remains composed and places complete trust in her crewmates to protect her

==== Wano Country ====
Robin infiltrating the shogun Kurozumi Orochi's banquet under the geisha alias "O-Robi" to gather intelligence on Kaido's forces and locate the country's Poneglyphs. During the raid on Onigashima, after Sanji refuses to fight a woman and entrusts his safety to her, Robin engages Tobiroppo member Black Maria. To protect Sanji and her friends, Robin unleashes her Demonio Fleur form reclaiming her infamous "Devil Child" epithet as a voluntary weapon and defeats Black Maria. Following the allience's victory, she explores the subterranean chambers beneath Wano with Kozuki Sukiyaki, discovering the country's Road Poneglyph and learning of the Ancient Weapon Pluton's location beneath the island

After Robin was unsuccessfully captured in Wano by CP0, the Government's direct intelligence agency after another Cipher Pol agency, CP9, had already failed to execute her two years prior, her bounty was raised to over seven times her previous bounty, from 130,000,000 to 930,000,000.

==== Egghead and Elbaph ====
Robin arrives on the futuristic insland of Egghead, where Dr. Vegapunk reveals that the books salvaged by Ohara's scholars during the Buster Call were rescued from the lake by giants and preserved on Elbaph by Jaguar D. Saul, who survived the incident. Despite sustaining injuries during the initial skirmishes with CP0 and being fiercely defendend by her crew against the arrival of Five Elders, the Ohara survivor escapes Egghead alongside the Giant Warrior Pirates.

Upon reaching Elbaph, Robin asks Brook to cut her hair back into her bangs before joyfully reuniting with Saul at the Owl Library, where she begins studying the preserved text of Ohara and joins the defense of giants' history against the invading God's Knights.

=== In other media ===
In the anime television series adaptation of the manga, Robin's voice actress is Yuriko Yamaguchi. In the 4Kids Entertainment English adaptation, her Baroque Works codename was changed to Miss Sunday and she is voiced by Veronica Taylor who portrays her with a country accent. In the Funimation English adaptation, her voice is supplied by Stephanie Young. In addition to the anime, Robin is featured in many of the adaptations based on the One Piece media franchise, including films, video games, and others as well. Emiya Ichikawa II performed as Robin in a kabuki play inspired by One Piece that ran at Tokyo's Shinbashi Enbujō throughout October and November 2015. Robin has also appeared as a playable character in the crossover fighting games Jump Super Stars and Jump Ultimate Stars.

Robin is portrayed by Lera Abova in the live action adaptation, in this series having more role before her first encounter with the Straw Hats, in a subplot where she visits Shellstown and Loguetown, and later having appearances during the events at Drum Island.

== Reception ==
=== Popularity ===
Nico Robin is one of the most popular characters in the One Piece series. Nico Robin has earned her place among anime audiences for many reasons. Ever since her debut, she has become a popular subject of cosplay, causing a trend in which female fan readers of the series attempt to replicate the various iconic looks of the character that have been shown over the years. In 2013, website Tokyo Otaku Mode held a poll asking anime and manga fans via Facebook which characters they would most want to date; Robin was ranked in 2nd place. In 2014, Goo Ranking conducted a poll amongst NTT customers by asking for their favorite female and male black-haired anime characters, with Robin ranking in 6th place out of the top 15 females.

=== Critical response ===
Reviewing One Piece, Rebecca Silverman of Anime News Network (ANN) said that Robin "watches everything with quiet, amused detachment", while also noting how Robin's store of knowledge is "steadily growing and she is starting to really put things together". Reviewing the 278th episode of the anime, Sam Leach of ANN commented that Robin's "big 'I want to live!' scene is one of the most cathartic moments you'll ever find in fiction".

Sean Cubillas of Screen Rant wrote, "Based on aesthetics alone, Nico Robin is an easy fan favorite for her design and well-written character traits. Her backstory more than skyrocketed her to legendary status, as it brought tears to everyone's eyes and expanded the series' scope and sense of politics. It didn't take long after that for the series to truly immortalize her." In another article, Cubillas stated, "Nico Robin, at first sight, is clearly one of the skilled characters of the group. Beneath an initial air of mystery, reserve, and a touch of gloom, Robin proved to one of the most empathetic, selfless, peaceful, protective, and kind-hearted members of Straw Hats crew. Even her introduction into the series as a former assassin and vice president to an underground organization and during this time, Robin never acted out of true evil and secretly sabotages Crocodile's plans when she can, even saving Luffy's life for twice. Fortunately for her, she's taken to the Straw Hats because she has nowhere to go to escape the Marines, which has been hunting her for years, in recent stories, especially after the timeskip, she has become an almost maternal figure; very more sweet, warm, loving and smiles much often of the crew. Whenever something dangerous or mysterious happens to the crew, Nico Robin always comes up with a darker scenario that dials up everyone's tensions further."

== See also ==
- Straw Hats
- List of One Piece characters
