= Straw Hats =

Protagonists of media franchise One Piece

- One Piece characters
- The Straw Hats
- First appearance: "Romance Dawn" (July 19, 1997; 29 years ago)
- Created by: Eiichiro Oda
- Captain: Monkey D. Luffy
- Senior Officers: Roronoa Zoro; Nami; Usopp; Sanji; Tony Tony Chopper; Nico Robin; Franky; Brook; Jimbei
- Other members: Zeus; Nefertari Vivi (former); Karoo (former)
- Pirate Ship: Thousand Sunny; Going Merry (former)
- Flag: Straw Hats' Jolly Roger

Crew Information
- Aliases: Straw Hat Pirates; Straw Hat Crew
- Species: Humans (Luffy, Zoro, Nami, Usopp, Sanji, Vivi, Robin, Brook); Reindeer (Chopper); Cyborg (Franky); Fish-Man (Jimbei)
- Title: Four Emperors
- Occupation: Pirates
- Affiliation: Straw Hat Grand Fleet; Four Emperors; Worst Generation; Ninja-Pirate-Mink-Samurai Alliance (former)
- Origin: East Blue (Luffy, Zoro, Nami, Usopp); North Blue (Sanji); Paradise (Chopper); West Blue (Robin, Brook); South Blue (Franky); Sea Floor (Jimbei)
- Bounty: 10,380,001,000 (total): 8,816,001,000 (Main crew); 1,564,000,000 (Grand Fleet)
- Allied Territories: Fish-Man Island; Wano Country

Straw Hat Grand Fleet
- Crews: Beautiful Pirates; Barto Club; Happosui Army; Ideo Pirates; Tontatta Pirates; New Giant Warrior Pirates; Yontamaria Fleet
- Representative Captains: Cavendish; Bartolomeo; Sai; Ideo; Leo; Hajrudin; Orlumbus

The Straw Hats, also known as the Straw Hat Crew (麦わらの一味, Mugiwara no Ichimi) (Note: Official name in Viz Media's translation of the manga and in the One Piece Card Game.) or the Straw Hat Pirates (麦わら海賊団, Mugiwara Kaizokudan), (Note: Official name in the English dub of the anime and in the live-action series.) are a fictional pirate crew and the main protagonists of the Japanese manga series One Piece, written and illustrated by Eiichiro Oda, and its related media. Captain Monkey D. Luffy leads the pirate crew, recruiting three-sword-style swordsman and former bounty hunter Roronoa Zoro, navigator and thief Nami, sniper and inventor Usopp, cook Sanji, doctor and anthropomorphic reindeer Tony Tony Chopper, archaeologist and historian Nico Robin, shipwright and cyborg Franky, musician and living skeleton Brook, and helmsman and martial artist Fish-Man Jimbei. Additionally, the diplomat and princess of Alabasta Nefertari Vivi traveled with the crew for a time, being considered as an honorary crewmember for the first six members of the crew. Travelling with the crew is also the cloud Zeus, serving as Nami's companion, while the Super Spot-Billed Duck Karoo also traveled temporarily with them as Nefertari Vivi's companion. The Straw Hats initially sail the seas aboard the caravel Going Merry before Franky builds a brigantine-rigged sloop-of-war called the Thousand Sunny that is the crew's current ship.

The Straw Hats are the protagonists of One Piece, and the crew explores the East Blue and Grand Line in pursuit of their dreams including their search for the mythical treasure called the One Piece. During their adventures, the Straw Hats encounter several friends and foes, including other pirates, bounty hunters, revolutionaries, members of organized crime, as well as all three types of great powers in One Piece: the World Government's Marines and allied privateer Seven Warlords of the Sea, and the strongest pirates known as the Four Emperors of the Sea.

A boy in the East Blue named Monkey D. Luffy seeks the One Piece and recruits new crew members while gaining a ship and entering the Grand Line. Leading pirates are in a race to find Laugh Tale, the hidden final island at the end of the Grand Line where the One Piece is said to be. The Straw Hats travel with Princess Nefertari Vivi of the Kingdom of Alabasta to save the island from a coup d'état by the Warlord Sir Crocodile, who seeks control over one of the Three Ancient Weapons said to be able to destroy the world. The Straw Hats become infamous worldwide after they escape from a World Government armada known as the Buster Call in the Enies Lobby Incident. Luffy and Zoro are labelled by the press as part of the Worst Generation of pirates as they reach the end of Paradise, the first half of the Grand Line.

Two years after the Straw Hats' journey began, they travel underwater together to Fish-Man Island to reach the New World, the second half of the Grand Line. After the Straw Hats save the country of Dressrosa from massacre by Warlord Donquixote Doflamingo, 5,640 pirates from crews captained by Cavendish, Bartolomeo, Sai, Ideo, Leo, Hajrudin, and Orlumbus swear allegiance to Luffy. The seven crews of the Straw Hat Grand Fleet are the Beautiful Pirates, Barto Club, Happosui Army, Ideo Pirates, Tontatta Pirates, New Giant Warrior Pirates, and the Yontamaria Fleet. The fleet pledges to defend each other when needed, and separates. The Straw Hats then form the Ninja-Pirate-Mink-Samurai Alliance to defeat Emperors Big Mom and Kaido in the Wano Country. Afterwards they are recognized worldwide as a great power led by Emperor of the Sea Luffy and his nine Senior Officers. The territories of Fish-Man Island and Wano swear allegiance to Luffy in exchange for protection. The new Emperor crew then sails from Wano to Egghead, where they escape another, larger Buster Call. The Straw Hats reunite with Hajrudin and the New Giant Warrior Pirates after landing on Elbaph, island of giants, where they are faced with renewed war from the World Government.

== Creation and conception ==
Eiichiro Oda's initial concept art for the Straw Hats

Eiichiro Oda first created the Straw Hats in his prototype one-shot, "Romance Dawn", then refined the artistic style and story elements before publishing the final product a year later as the first chapter of One Piece. In the second version of "Romance Dawn", Luffy resembled his design at the beginning of the series.

While the Straw Hats are sometimes called the Straw Hat Pirates by non-Straw Hat characters in One Piece, Eiichiro Oda prefers the term Straw Hats (麦わらの一味, Mugiwara no Ichimi), explaining that "I've decided to always call them the 'Straw Hats.' I've never called them anything else."

== Crew overview and portrayals ==
Straw Hats
Name	Role	Abilities and Fighting Styles	Devil Fruit	Alias	Bounty in	Anime voice actor(s)		Live actor(s)
Name	Role	Abilities and Fighting Styles	Devil Fruit	Alias	Bounty in	JP	US	Live actor(s)
Monkey D. Luffy	Captain	Rubber-based combat, Advanced Haki, Gears transformations (Second to Fifth), extreme agility and strength.	Mythical Zoan-type Human-Human Fruit, Model: Nika (a.k.a. Paramecia-type Gum-Gum Fruit)	"Straw Hat" Luffy	3,000,000,000	Mayumi Tanaka	Erica Schroeder (4Kids) Colleen Clinkenbeard (Funimation)	Iñaki Godoy
Roronoa Zoro	Combatant (Note: Often referred to simply as the crew's Swordsman; in the live-action series, his position is changed to First Mate of the crew.)	Three-Sword Style, Asura form, Advanced Armament and Conqueror's Haki, extreme endurance and strength	—N/a	"Pirate Hunter" Zoro "King of Hell"	1,111,000,000	Kazuya Nakai	Marc Diraison (4Kids) Christopher Sabat (Funimation)	Mackenyu
Nami	Navigator	Clima-Tact for weather-based attacks and techniques, Zeus-enhanced lightning strikes, tactical deception	—N/a	"Cat Burglar" Nami	366,000,000	Akemi Okamura	Kerry Williams (4Kids) Luci Christian (Funimation)	Emily Rudd
Usopp	Sniper	Master marksman, Pop Green plant weapons, Observation Haki	—N/a	"God" Usopp "Sogeking"	500,000,000	Kappei Yamaguchi	Jason Griffith (4Kids) Sonny Strait (Funimation)	Jacob Romero Gibson
Sanji	Cook	Black Leg kicking style, Diable Jambe & Ifrit Jambe (fire-powered kicks), Sky Walk (mid-air mobility), enhanced durability, Observation and Armament Haki.	—N/a	"Black Leg" Sanji	1,032,000,000	Hiroaki Hirata	David Moo (4Kids) Eric Vale (Funimation)	Taz Skylar
Tony Tony Chopper	Doctor	Zoan transformations, Rumble Ball-enhanced forms, medical expertise	Zoan-type Human-Human Fruit	"Cotton Candy Lover" Chopper	1,000	Ikue Ōtani Kazue Ikura (254–263)	Brina Palencia (Funimation)	Mikaela Hoover (Note: In addition of Hoover acting as the voice and facial capture for the character, N'kone Mametja acts as the on-set proxy for Chopper's hybrid form, while Gavin Gomes acts as the suit performer for Chopper's Heavy Point.)
Nico Robin	Archaeologist	Multi-limb projection, joint locks and pressure point attacks	Paramecia-type Flower-Flower Fruit	"Devil Child"	930,000,000	Yuriko Yamaguchi	Veronica Taylor (4Kids) Stephanie Young (Funimation)	Lera Abova
Franky	Shipwright	Cyborg body with superhuman strength, built-in weapons (lasers, cannons, missiles)	—N/a	"Cyborg" Franky	394,000,000	Kazuki Yao Subaru Kimura	Patrick Seitz (Funimation)	TBD
Brook	Musician	Super speed, ice-based sword techniques, soul projection, water walking	Paramecia-type Revive-Revive Fruit	"Soul King" Brook	383,000,000	Chō	Ian Sinclair (Funimation)	Martial T. Batchamen
Jimbei	Helmsman	Fish-Man Karate & Jujutsu, superhuman strength, water manipulation, Armament and Observation Haki	—N/a	"First Son of the Sea" "Knight of the Sea"	1,100,000,000	Daisuke Gōri Katsuhisa Hōki	Daniel Baugh (Funimation)	TBD

== Crew members ==
=== Monkey D. Luffy ===
Monkey D. Luffy (モンキー・D・ルフィ, Monkī Dī Rufi) is the captain of the Straw Hat Crew and the main protagonist of the One Piece franchise. At age seven, he admires and tries to join the pirates of the "Red-Haired" Shanks. Ridiculed and rejected, he inadvertently eats their treasure, the Paramecia-type Gum-Gum Fruit (ゴムゴムの実, Gomu Gomu no Mi), which grants his body the properties of rubber. His reckless actions ultimately lead him into danger, causing Shanks to lose an arm while rescuing him from a Sea King. After this, Luffy gives up on joining Shanks, resolving instead to start a crew of his own and become King of the Pirates.^{[ch. 1]} Displeased by Shanks influencing his grandson, Monkey D. Garp takes Luffy to be raised by Curly Dadan, a mountain bandit, and her team of bandits, who he strong-arms and blackmails into taking him in. During Luffy's time there, he becomes a sworn brother with Portgas D. Ace, Garp's other ward, and Sabo, a young local runaway noble.^{[ch. 582–589]} Ten years later and still wearing Shanks' treasured straw hat, Luffy forms and commands his own pirate crew called the Straw Hat Pirates and sets sail for the Grand Line, quickly gaining infamy as "Straw Hat" Luffy (麦わらのルフィ, Mugiwara no Rufi).^{[ch. 2, 7, 96, 98]} Eventually, after his strength proves insufficient to save Ace from execution, he spends two years on a secluded island, practising the use of all three types of Haki as well as developing his rubber ability's Fourth Gear with Silvers Rayleigh, before heading to the New World.^{[ch. 590–602]} Due to his infamy, he is one of the eleven pirates who are known as "The Worst Generation". After the defeat of Kaido and Big Mom, he was subsequently named one of the newest members of the Four Emperors. Luffy is also capable of using the advanced application for all three types of Haki. During his fight with Kaido, his Devil Fruit power awakened, revealing its true nature as the Mythical Zoan-type Human-Human Fruit, Model: Nika (ヒトヒトの実 モデル“ニカ”, Hito Hito no Mi, Moderu: Nika), granting him a cartoon-like ability to warp reality and turn his environment into rubber. He can also turn into a giant monkey zoan hybrid. He has gained mastery of all three advanced forms of Haki.

=== Roronoa Zoro ===
Roronoa Zoro (ロロノア・ゾロ, Roronoa Zoro) is a proficient swordsman who is the only known user of the Three-Sword Style (Santoryu), holding one in each hand and a third in his mouth, although he is also capable of fighting with only one or two swords.^{[ch. 3, 5, 28]} To fulfill a promise to Kuina, his deceased childhood friend and rival, he aims to defeat Dracule Mihawk and become the world's greatest swordsman.^{[ch. 5, 50]} Traveling the seas in search of Mihawk and making a living as a bounty hunter, he became infamously known as "Pirate Hunter" Zoro (海賊狩りのゾロ, Kaizoku-Gari no Zoro), a title he rejects.

Eventually, he comes into conflict with Helmeppo, the spoiled son of a navy officer named Axe-Hand Morgan. To prevent the harm of innocent civilians, Zoro allows himself to be incarcerated temporarily, while Helmeppo plots to have him killed. Zoro is saved from execution by Luffy in exchange for becoming his first crewman. Initially, Zoro makes it clear that he would turn on his captain if he ever stepped between him and his dream.^{[ch. 2–6]} However, Zoro grows fond of his crew and becomes extremely loyal towards Luffy, and after several defeats in their defense, his priorities change and he convinces Dracule Mihawk to take him on as a student during the two-year timeskip.^{[ch. 51f., 485, 597]} Zoro is capable of utilizing all three types of Haki and is capable of using the advanced application for both Haoshoku and Busoshoku Haki. He is known for his complete lack of a sense of direction and constantly gets lost when traveling.

=== Nami ===
Nami (ナミ), adopted and raised by Marine officer turned tangerine farmer Belle-Mère, in her childhood witnessed her mother being murdered by the infamous Arlong, whose pirate gang occupies their island and extracts tribute from the population. Striking a deal with him, Nami, still a child, but already an accomplished cartographer who dreams of drawing a complete map of the world, joins the pirates, hoping to buy freedom for her village eventually. Growing up as a pirate-hating thief drawing maps for Arlong and stealing treasure from other pirates, Nami becomes an excellent burglar, pickpocket, and navigator with an exceptional ability to forecast weather.^{[ch. 77, 95, 130]} After Arlong betrays her, and he and his gang are defeated by the Straw Hat Pirates, Nami joins them in pursuit of her dream and acquires infamy herself as "Cat Burglar" Nami (泥棒猫のナミ, Dorobō Neko no Nami).^{[ch. 94f., 435]}

==== Zeus ====
Zeus (ゼウス, Zeusu) is a cloud Homie who Big Mom created, originally being one of her main sidekicks.^{[ch. 843]} He was captured by Nami in Whole Cake Island,^{[ch. 890]} and after escaping he partnered up with her, residing inside Nami's Sorcery Clima-Tact.^{[ch. 903]}

Zeus is voiced by Yū Mizushima in the original Japanese version and by Kevin D. Thelwell in the Funimation dub.

=== Usopp ===
Usopp (ウソップ, Usoppu) was abandoned during his early childhood by his father, Yasopp, who left to join the Red-Haired Pirates. As his mother, Banchina, falls ill, Usopp starts telling tall tales, expressing his hope that his father will return and take them out to sea. He regularly goes to the mansion at the top of the hill where he lives, to visit Kaya. Even after his mother dies, Usopp does not blame his father for leaving. Despite his cowardly disposition, he strives to become a great pirate.^{[ch. 25, 41]} Usopp is recognizable for his long nose, a reference to the fact that he tends to lie a lot. He is also a gifted inventor, painter, and sculptor.^{[ch. 42, 106, 190]} In combat, he relies primarily on slingshots to fire various kinds of ammunition with great precision in coordination with a set of lies and other weapons giving him a unique fighting style named "The Usopp Arsenal".^{[ch. 332]} To help the Straw Hats rescue Nico Robin, he achieves notoriety under his adopted alter-ego "Sogeking, the King of Snipers" (狙撃の王様そげキング, Sogeki no Ō-sama Sogekingu), a hero sniper wearing a golden mask and cape. Eventually, after helping the Straw Hats liberate Dressrosa from Donquixote Doflamingo's rule, he becomes infamous as "God" Usopp (ゴッド ウソップ, Goddo Usoppu).^{[ch. 435]}

=== Sanji ===
Sanji (サンジ), born as Vinsmoke Sanji (ヴィンスモーク・サンジ, Vinsumōku Sanji), was a prince of Germa Kingdom. He was routinely ridiculed by his genetically enhanced siblings and is locked away by his father Vinsmoke Judge for being a disgrace. With help from his sister Vinsmoke Reiju, he escapes and flees Germa, a floating kingdom composed of several ships, after it enters the East Blue and his father permits it. While serving as an apprentice cook on the passenger ship the Orbit, nine-year-old Sanji stands up to a boarding party of pirates led by the infamous "Red Foot" Zeff. During the encounter, Sanji is swept into the sea by a massive wave. Zeff jumps in after him because of their common dream of finding the All Blue (オールブルー, Ōru Burū), a legendary area where the East, West, North, and South Blue seas meet, containing every kind of fish in the world. They ended up stranded on a barren rock with no access to food, and Zeff saves Sanji's life yet again by giving him all of their food. After their eventual rescue, Sanji stays with Zeff for several years and helps him build a floating restaurant, the Baratie (バラティエ). Zeff in turn trains him in the culinary arts and teaches him his kick-based fighting style.^{[ch. 56–59]} Mirroring Zeff, Sanji will never refuse a starving person a meal and he uses only his legs when fighting to protect his hands, which he needs for cooking.^{[ch. 48, 370]} He has a massive weakness for women and makes it a principle never to harm one, even if it endangers his life.^{[ch. 403]}

Eventually, he becomes infamous as "Black Leg" Sanji (黒脚のサンジ, Kuro Ashi no Sanji).^{[ch. 435]} While training for a period of two years in Emporio Ivankov's Kamabakka Queendom (カマバッカ王国, Kamabakka Ōkoku), he develops the Sky Walk (空中歩行(スカイ・ウォーク), Sukai Wōku), a variant of the Six Powers (六式, Rokushiki) technique Moonwalk (月歩, Geppo), which allows him to essentially run through air.^{[ch. 635]} Sanji receives his own Raid Suit from his family that grants him the ability to turn invisible^{[ch. 903]}, though he later destroys it out of fear of losing his humanity.^{[ch. 1031]}

Sanji's standard choice of clothing a well-fitting black suit with a blue shirt and skinny black tie. He is almost always portrayed with his hair covering one of his eyes, and he is often shown smoking a cigarette.

=== Tony Tony Chopper ===
Tony Tony Chopper (トニートニー・チョッパー, Tonī Tonī Choppā) is an anthropomorphic reindeer and doctor. The power of the Zoan-type Human-Human Fruit (ヒトヒトの実, Hito Hito no Mi) provides him with the ability to transform into a full-sized reindeer or a reindeer-human hybrid.^{[ch. 140]} A self-developed drug he calls Rumble Ball (ランブル・ボール, Ranburu Bōru) enables him to perform even more transformations for three minutes.^{[ch. 149]} With help from Caesar Clown, Chopper can last in his transformations for about 30 minutes.^{[ch. 1014]} Rejected by his herd because of his blue nose and eating the Devil Fruit, Chopper is rescued by Drum Island's quack doctor named Hiriluk. Chopper is heartbroken when Hiriluk falls ill with a deadly disease while developing a potion to create cherry blossoms when in contact with snow. After Hiriluk's death, Dr. Kureha takes him in as his mentor. After the Straw Hats arrive at Drum Island and take Chopper with them, Kureha uses Hiriluk's potion to turn the snowy sky into cherry blossoms, fulfilling Hiriluk's life mission. When complimented, Chopper acts flustered and sometimes yells at the person who complimented him to stop trying to make him happy.^{[ch. 140]} A running gag within the series is when other characters mistake him as a Tanuki, and he angrily corrects them, pointing out that he is a Tonakai (Japanese for "Reindeer").

When creating Chopper, Oda wanted a mascot who is both cute and feeble. An IGN review of the manga praised Chopper's character as one of the best in the series and said that he was able to be both touching and funny. With Chopper's backstory, Oda wanted to illustrate that one need not be blood-related to be considered family.

=== Nico Robin ===
Nico Robin (ニコ・ロビン, Niko Robin) was raised in Ohara (オハラ), home of the world's oldest and largest library. Robin becomes an archaeologist at the age of eight.^{[ch. 218,391f.]} At some point she gains the power of the Paramecia-type Flower-Flower Fruit (ハナハナの実, Hana Hana no Mi), which allows her to sprout temporary copies of parts of her body on surfaces around her.^{[ch. 170]} Behind her teachers' backs, she acquires from them the outlawed knowledge of how to translate the ancient stones called Poneglyphs (歴史の本文( ポーネグリフ), Pōnegurifu; alt. Poneglyphs), which are scattered around the world. She comes to share their goal of finding the elusive Rio Poneglyph (真の歴史の本文(リオ・ポーネグリフ), Rio Pōnegurifu), which is said to tell the world's lost history referred to as the 100-Year Void (空白の100年, Kūhaku no Hyaku-nen; Void Century).^{[ch. 218]} However, the World Government finds out about these efforts and sends a Buster Call to destroy the island, a fleet of 20 Marine warships and five Vice Admirals. Only Robin escapes the devastating attack that claims the lives of the island's entire population, including that of her mother.^{[ch. 218, 395]} Called "Devil Child" (悪魔の子, Akuma no Ko), traumatized, and with a bounty on her head, Robin spends 20 years of her life on the run, unable to trust anyone.^{[ch. 218]}

To survive, she cooperates with various pirates and other outlaws. She eventually joins Sir Crocodile's Baroque Works group, using the codename "Ms. All-Sunday" (ミス・オールサンデー, Misu Ōrusandē)^{[ch. 398]} and becomes their vice-president.^{[ch. 218]}

After Baroque Works falls apart, with nowhere else to go, she tags along with the Straw Hat Pirates^{[ch. 218]} and grows so fond of them that she gives herself up to the Government to save them in Water 7. After they discover her real reason for leaving, the Straw Hat Pirates declare open war against the Government to get her back. She realizes that she has finally found people who will never betray her and officially joins the crew.^{[ch. 398]} During the two-year timeskip, Robin further hones her Devil Fruit powers with the Revolutionary Army to the point where she can create a full-bodied duplicate of herself.

=== Franky ===
Franky (フランキー, Furankī), born as Cutty Flam (カティ・フラム, Kati Furamu), is the son of pirate parents who abandoned him at age nine. Cutty Flam was taken in as an apprentice by shipwright Tom, who built Pirate King Gold Roger's ship, the Oro Jackson. He secretly holds the plans for a devastating ancient weapon, eventually adopting the nickname Franky.^{[ch. 344, 354, 427]} Franky's recklessness eventually provides an opportunity for World Government agents seeking these plans.^{[ch. 356]} Attempting to rescue Tom from unjust imprisonment, Franky suffers severe injuries and only survives by rebuilding parts of his body using pieces of scrap metal, turning himself into a cola-powered cyborg with superhuman strength.^{[ch. 336, 339, 352, 357f.]} After gaining notoriety as "Cyborg" Franky (サイボーグ フランキー, Saibōgu Furankī), and to fulfill his dream of sailing a ship he built around the world, he constructs the Thousand Sunny, a brigantine-rigged sloop-of-war for the Straw Hat Pirates and joins the crew.^{[ch. 435–437]}

=== Brook ===
Brook (ブルック, Burukku) was already a pirate before the time of Gold Roger. Brook first enters the Grand Line as a member of the music-themed Rumbar Pirates. Leaving his pet, the infant island whale Laboon, at Reverse Mountain, he promises to return after sailing around the world.^{[ch. 487]} After losing his captain "Calico" Yorki, Brook took over the crew as the new captain. Some time later, he is killed by poison, but the power of the Paramecia-type Revive-Revive Fruit (ヨミヨミの実, Yomi Yomi no Mi) allows him to resurrect as a skeleton.^{[ch. 443]} Fifty years later, Brook's goal is still to fulfill his late crew's promise, and to that end he joins the Straw Hat Pirates.^{[ch. 459]} He is an excellent musician who claims that he can play any instrument, although he is usually seen playing the violin.^{[ch. 486]} Brook can even influence people with his music to the point of making them fall asleep.^{[ch. 454]} While separated from the other Straw Hats, and incognito as "Soul King" Brook, he gains world fame, filling concert halls with fans.^{[ch. 600]} He is also a skilled fencer who uses a shikomizue (a Japanese cane sword) in battle.^{[ch. 454]} His reduced weight allows him to jump extraordinarily high and to run across water.^{[ch. 443, 493]} Eventually, Brook learns how to use his Devil Fruit ability to leave his skeleton body and explore his surroundings as a disembodied soul.^{[ch. 629]}

Oda first conceived the idea of a skeleton musician in 2000, about the time of Laboon's introduction and more than half a decade before the first appearance of Brook.

=== Jimbei ===
Jimbei
- Jimbei illustrated by Eiichiro Oda in the color spread of Chapter 1000
- First appearance: One Piece chapter 528: "Jimbei, First Son of the Sea" (Weekly Shōnen Jump No. 8, January 19, 2009)
- Created by: Eiichiro Oda
- Voiced by: Japanese: Daisuke Gori (Episodes 430-42); Katsuhisa Hoki (Episode 440-present); English: Daniel Baugh
- Birthday: April 2

In-universe information
- Nicknames: "First Son of the Sea" Jimbei (海侠のジンベエ, Kaikyō no Jinbē?); "Boss Jimbei" (ジンベエ親分, Jinbē Oyabun)
- Species: Whale shark Fish-Man
- Gender: Male
- Occupation: Pirate, Helmsman (Straw Hats; formerly captain of the Sun Pirates)
- Age: 44 (debut); 46 (after the timeskip)
- Bounties: 1,100,000,000 (current); 438,000,000 (after timeskip); 250,000,000 (frozen as warlord); 76,000,000 (first)

Jimbei (ジンベエ, Jinbē; spelled Jinbe in the original Japanese translation), also known as "First Son of the Sea" Jimbei ((海侠のジンベエ, Kaikyō no Jinbē), is a whale shark Fish-Man, being the tenth member of the Straw Hats and the ninth to join, serving as their helmsman. Jimbei was originally introduced as one of the Seven Warlords of the Sea who is imprisoned by the World Government after he refuses to support the execution of his friend and Monkey D. Luffy's brother Portgas D. Ace. Luffy frees Jimbei, who resigns his position as Warlord of the Sea, and fight to stop the execution of Ace.

Two years later, Jimbei meets the Straw Hats on Fish-Men Island and apologizes to Nami for setting Arlong free. The Straw Hats and Jimbei save Fish-Man Island from a coup d'état by the New Fish-Man Pirates, Fish-men supremacists were inspired by Arlong. Luffy asks Jimbei to join his crew, and he agrees but says he needs to settle his affairs with Big Mom. Jimbei later rebels against Big Mom and helps Luffy plan an unsuccessful assassination attempt against her, officially joining the Straw Hats. then reunites with his new crew to successfully defeat an alliance between Big Mom and Kaido of the Four Emperors. After the Straw Hats emerge triumphant, Jimbei becomes one of Emperor Luffy's Senior Officers and currently has the third-highest bounty in the crew after Luffy and Roronoa Zoro.

=== Nefertari Vivi ===
Nefertari Vivi
- Nefertari Vivi illustrated by Eiichiro Oda in the color spread of Chapter 1084.
- First appearance: One Piece chapter 103: "The Whale" (Weekly Shōnen Jump No. 41, September 6, 1999)
- Created by: Eiichiro Oda
- Portrayed by: Charithra Chandran; Aroop Shergill (young)
- Voiced by: Misa Watanabe (Japanese); Karen Neill (4Kids English dub); Caitlin Glass (Funimation dub)
- Birthday: February 2
- Age: 16 (debut); 18 (after the timeskip)

In-universe information
- Alias: Ms. Wednesday (former codename)
- Occupation: Princess of Alabasta; Baroque Works Frontier Agent (former); Pirate crewmember (former)

Nefertari Vivi (ネフェルタリ・ビビ, Neferutari Bibi; surname spelled as Nefeltari in some English adaptations) is the princess of the Kingdom of Alabasta. She is usually accompanied by her Super Spot-Billed Duck Karoo. Whilst she favors diplomacy over fighting, Vivi makes use of peacock slashers in combat: two jeweled blades held on strings attached to her little fingers.^{[ch. 109f.]}

Prior to the events of the series, Vivi went undercover with Karoo and Alabasta Royal Guard Igaram as Baroque Works agents after the organization instigates a rebellion against her father Nefertari Cobra. By the time she meets the Straw Hats, she operated as the frontier agent Ms. Wednesday (ミス・ウェンズデー, Misu Wenzudē) and is partnered with Mr. 9. Initially antagonizing the Straw Hats, she was forced to ask their aid when Baroque Works learned of her true identity. Vivi sailed with them to Alabasta, participating in their adventures and battles with Baroque Works. After they defeated Crocodile and stopped the civil war, she declines an invitation to permanently join the Straw Hats to stay in Alabasta.^{[ch. 216]} Due to her time with the Straw Hats and devoted friendship with them, Vivi is considered a member of the crew by those who traveled with her.

Vivi followed their adventures through news reports and their wanted posters.^{[ch. 439]} During the two year time-skip, she remained princess of Alabasta and attends the Reverie at Mary Geoise with her father. After Cobra was murdered by Imu, Vivi was abducted by CP0 for an enforced disappearance, only to be inadvertently saved by Wapol despite their extremely hostile relationship. The two are currently in hiding with Morgans and the World Economic Journal.^{[ch. 1086]}

Vivi was ranked as #82 in a survey conducted by Newtype for favorite anime heroine in 2002.

Her voice actress is Misa Watanabe in the original Japanese version. In the 4Kids English adaptation, she is voiced by Karen Neil. Vivi is voiced by Caitlin Glass in the Funimation English dub. In the live-action series, Vivi is portrayed by Charithra Chandran, while Aroop Shergill portrays the character in her youth.

==== Karoo ====
Karoo (カルー, Karū) is a Super Spot-Billed Duck, a flightless ostrich-sized duck with no webbed feet who is capable of running extremely fast. He is Nefertari Vivi's animal companion and mount, as well as the leader of the Super Spot-Billed Duck Troops (The Supersonic Duck Squadron in the Funimation dub), which also consists of similar ducks.^{[ch. 109f.]}

His vocal effects are provided by Hiroaki Hirata in the original Japanese version and by Michael Haigney and Monica Rial in the 4Kids and Funimation dubs respectively.

== Pirate ships ==
=== Going Merry ===
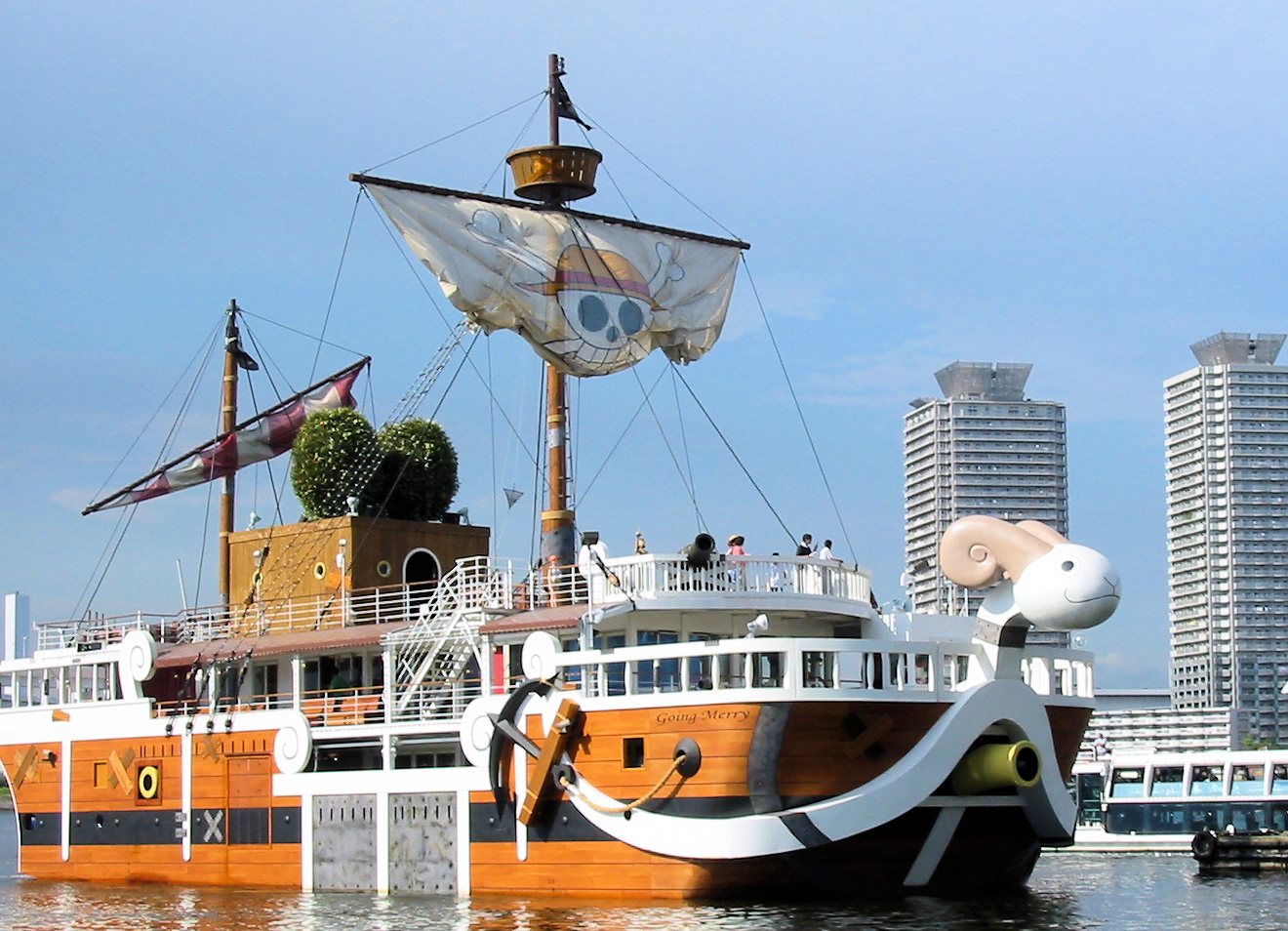
Replica of the Going Merry in Odaiba

The Going Merry (ゴーイング・メリー号, Gōingu Merī-gō) was the first ship of the crew. Kaya gifts the Straw Hats the Going Merry after they save her town. Usopp joins the crew while the Straw Hats sail away to their new ship. The Merry sails from the East Blue into Paradise, the first half of the Grand Line. At one point it is converted into a form able to fly to reach the Sky Island Skypiea. On Skypiea, Usopp works with Luffy and Sanji to rescue Nami and the others, who had been taken to a sacrificial altar, and they engage in combat against the priest Satori. That night, Usopp witnesses a mysterious figure repairing the Going Merry, which had been damaged in an attack by the priest Shura.

Upon landing back in the Blue Seas, the Merry is heavily damaged and Luffy seeks a shipwright to repair it. The crew arrives at Water 7, an island famous for its world-renowned shipwrights. They explore the city, have the loot they took from Skypiea appraised, and have Galley-La, a team of shipwrights, look at their ship. Though willing to pay any price to repair the Merry, the damage it sustained during their adventures is too great to be fixed. Luffy reluctantly decides to abandon the ship. Usopp, having grown attached to the Merry, is unwilling to take this course of action and challenges Luffy's captaincy. They duel each other later that day, in which Usopp is defeated. After this, Usopp decides to leave the Straw Hats, and the others go searching for a new ship. Meanwhile, the Aqua Laguna, an annual storm that strikes Water Seven, is about to return. To coincide with this Iceburg, the owner of Galley-La, is attacked, and Nico Robin is labeled as the prime suspect. Knowing Robin is a member of the Straw Hats, the citizens of Water Seven turn against them.

The Straw Hats are on the run and Robin is nowhere to be found. In order to determine where her allegiances lie, the Straw Hats decide to break into Galley-La's headquarters to find her. To their surprise, they are not the only ones laying siege to Galley-La; a masked group has already infiltrated the headquarters looking for the blueprints to the ancient weapon Pluton. After finding the blueprints and discovering that they are fake, the masked individuals approach the recovering Iceburg. They remove their disguises, revealing themselves as Robin and some of the workers of Galley-La. Members of the secret government organization, Cipher Pol 9, they joined Galley-La to gain Pluton for the government's use. After speaking with Iceberg, they learn that the real blueprints are with Franky, a shipwright and friend of Iceberg.

The Straw Hats arrive on the scene and find Robin with CP9. Although she claims to want nothing more to do with them, Luffy and company attack CP9 so that they can talk to her. They are quickly defeated, and CP9 departs to look for Franky. As the Aqua Laguna approaches, Franky has given Usopp and the Merry shelter. Usopp tells Franky he saw the spirit of the Merry in Skypiea repairing itself, which Franky reveals is a spirit known as a Klabautermann. Soon enough CP9 arrives looking for Franky and his blueprints. Because his teacher, entrusted him with the blueprints years earlier, and forfeited his own life to insure Pluton never fell into the government's hands, Franky refuses to reveal their location.

After the Straw Hats recover from their injuries they discover that Robin has sided with the government in order to save the rest of the crew from destruction. CP9 captures Franky and Usopp and takes them and Robin to Enies Lobby, the government's judiciary island, using a sea train. Sanji sneaks on board in an effort to save them, freeing Usopp and Franky before continuing on to Robin. The rest of the Straw Hats, the loyal members of Galley-la, and Franky's friends follow on a sea train of their own, unimpeded by the Aqua Laguna.

As they move through the train looking for Robin, Sanji, Usopp, and Franky deal with the lesser members of Cipher Pol. Although they find her, Robin does not allow herself to be saved. CP9 captures Franky again, kicks Sanji and Usopp from the train, and continues on to Enies Lobby. Sanji and Usopp wait along the tracks, and reunite with Luffy and the others when they go by. They arrive at the judiciary island soon after CP9 does and engage the forces of the world government in order to get Robin back.

The Straw Hats lay waste to Enies Lobby, defeating anyone who tries to keep them from Robin. As the rest of the crew deals with the less formidable guardians of the island, Luffy goes ahead and calls out to CP9. Only one member of CP9, Blueno, agrees to fight him, remembering how quickly Luffy was defeated in their last encounter. As the battle progresses Luffy demonstrates his ability to use one of CP9's abilities. After using his "Gear Two" and before demonstrating his "Gear Three", Luffy defeats Blueno and calls out to Robin that he is there to rescue her.

The Straw Hats and CP9, and their two captives, face each other down. Nico Robin tries turning the crew away again, but when Monkey D. Luffy tells her that she can die as part of the crew instead, Robin experiences a flashback to her childhood. Raised on an island of archaeologists, Robin and the rest of the islanders attempt to discover the secret of the void century, a period in time that the government forbids anyone to know. To prevent knowledge of the void century from spreading, the island and its inhabitants (except Robin) are destroyed. Aokiji allows Robin to escape, challenging her to find friends and to live. Realizing that she had almost given up on both, Robin decides she wants to live with the rest of the Straw Hats. Touched by their words, Franky reveals that the blueprints CP9 have been searching are hidden on his person, but they are not that of Pluton, but an "opposing weapon" and he promptly destroys them, giving CP9 no further reason to keep him in custody.

The Straw Hats and Franky break off and engage CP9 in battle. Unsuited for the initial pairings, the crew exchanges opponents to improve their chances of victory, allowing two members of CP9 to be defeated. Meanwhile, Luffy follows Robin's captors, CP9 leader Spandam and CP9's strongest member Rob Lucci. Lucci fights Luffy in order to give Spandam time to take Robin to the government's inescapable prisons. Instead, while trying to call for help, Spandam accidentally triggers the destruction of the Straw Hats, summoning the world government to destroy Enies Lobby and whoever is on it.

With the destruction of Enies Lobby imminent, all government personnel begin to evacuate. The Straw Hats continue fighting and, with the exception of Luffy versus Lucci, defeat the remaining members of CP9. Their battles won, they team up and hurry to stop Robin from being taken past the point of no return. They succeed and Robin is freed.

As the battle between Luffy and Lucci rages on, the destruction of Enies Lobby commences. The members of Galley-La and the "Franky Family" evacuate as the government employees have done, and the Straw Hats secure an escape route to use after Lucci's defeat. Once Luffy wins however, Enies Lobby's destroyers unite in their efforts to finish off the crew that beat CP9. Just when they lose their last piece of refuge, the Straw Hats are able to escape on the Merry, it having come to save them in their time of need. The crew joins with Galley-La and the Franky Family and returns to Water Seven. The Merry begins to break down during the trip, so with heavy hearts the crew says goodbye to the vessel and gives it a Viking funeral.^{[ch. 41–430]}

=== Thousand Sunny ===
The Thousand Sunny (サウザンドサニー号, Sauzando Sanī-gō) is the second ship of the crew. When the Straw Hats return to Water Seven after the Enies Lobby Incident, Franky decides to build a new ship to replace the Going Merry for the Straw Hats and joins them to fulfill his dream of sailing a ship he built around the world. Franky and Galley-La construct a brigantine-rigged sloop-of-war for the Straw Hats using a 200,000,000 berry piece of wood from the Treasure Tree Adam. Meanwhile, the Straw Hats learn that they have been blamed for the destruction of Enies Lobby and have bounties on their heads because of it. Since Franky is also subject to a bounty, he decides to join the Straw Hats after completing their ship, although they have to trick him into it by stealing his trunks. Usopp also officially rejoins the crew and the Straw Hats name their new ship Thousand Sunny before escaping Water Seven with the Sunny's signature Coup de Burst technique, consuming three barrels of cola to fly one kilometer into the air.^{[ch. 435–439]} The ship can shoot the powerful Gaon Cannon using five barrels of cola. The Thousand Sunny can even go into reverse with the Chicken Voyage technique where the mane acts as a propeller.^{[ch. 495]}

The Straw Hats continue their adventure across the seas. After being stuck in a fog not even the sun can penetrate, the crew meets Brook, a living skeleton who immediately agrees to join their crew. Unfortunately for the Straw Hats, Brook lost his shadow on the giant ship known as Thriller Bark and cannot accompany them outside the fog. Determined to have Brook as part of the crew, they go to the Thriller Bark in order to get Brook's shadow back from Gecko Moria. Tony Tony Chopper, Usopp, and Nami serve as the first boarding party, and use the Mini Merry II, a small steamboat designed to look like the Merry. This is just one component of the ship's Soldier Dock System, with the others being Nami's waver from Skypiea that lets one travel quickly across the seas, and the Shark Submerge 3 submarine.^{[ch. 442–444]} The Sunny is taken over by Perona of the Thriller Bark Pirates, who orders Moria's treasure loaded onto it. Bartholomew Kuma then appears and sends her to a different island with his Paw Paw Fruit powers. The Straw Hats leave victorious with a new musician and lots of treasure towards Fish-Man Island. First they must coat their ship with a special resin in order to travel down 10,000 meters below sea level. While the Straw Hats are waiting for the three-day coating period to end, Kuma uses his powers to separate the crew at Saboady Archipelago.^{[ch. 471–513]}

After the Straw Hats are defeated at Saboady Archipelago, Bartholomew Kuma arrives to watch over the Sunny until the crew reunites and sails underwater to Fish-Man Island.^{[ch. 603]} On Fish-Man Island, Franky reveals the new Soldier Dock System components Black Rhino FR-U 4 and Brachio Tank V that can combine to form a robot mecha called General Franky who wields a sword called Franken.^{[ch. 636]}

== Jolly Roger ==
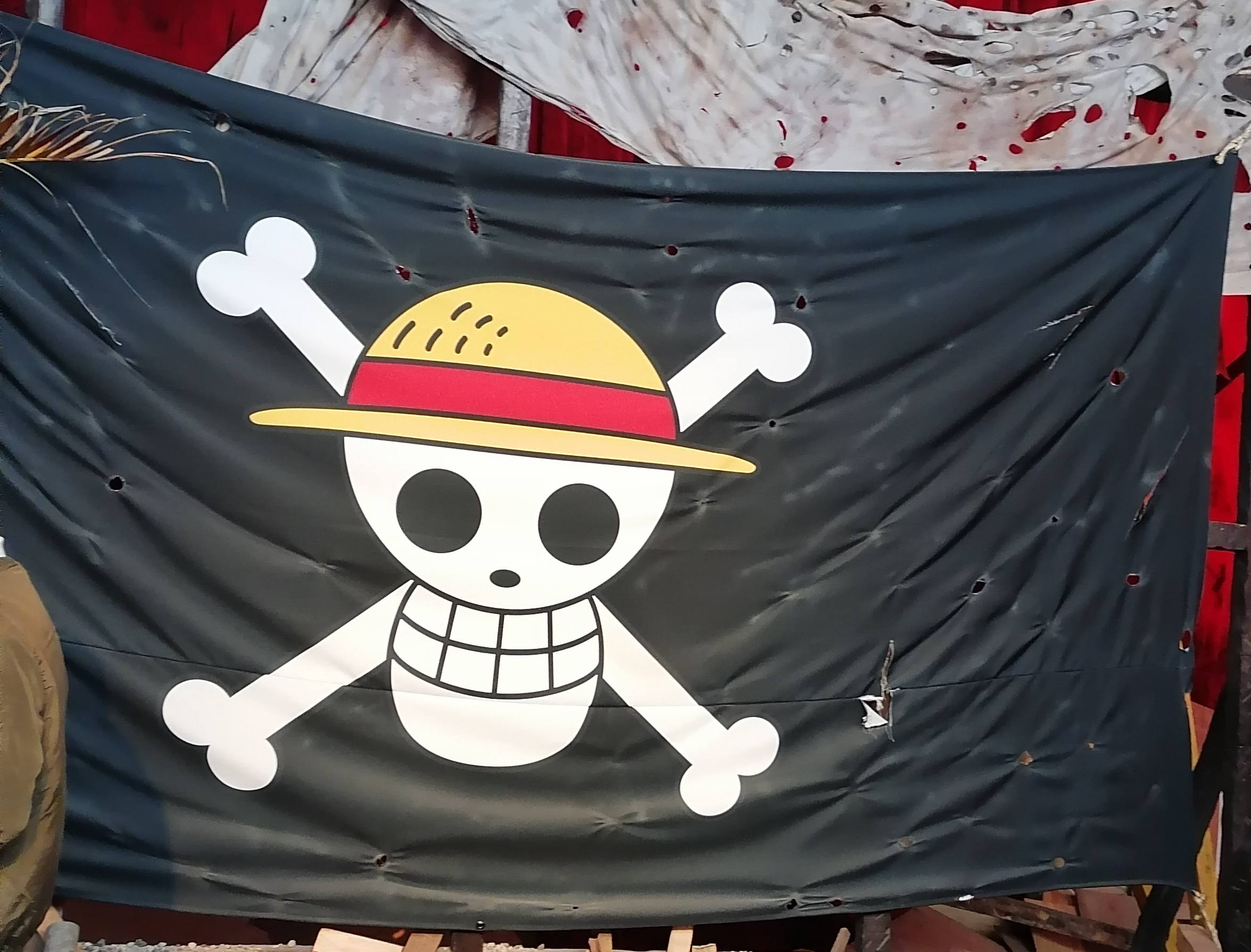
The crew's Jolly Roger at One Piece Fan Fest 2023

The Straw Hat's Jolly Roger (Japanese: 麦わらの一味の旗, Hepburn: Mugiwara no Ichimi no Hata) is a pirate flag of a skull and crossbones wearing a straw hat. The flag represents the straw hat worn the crew's captain, Monkey D. Luffy. In Eiichiro Oda's One Piece series, each pirate crew has its own distinct Jolly Roger that reflects its traits and beliefs. Although the flag was originally drawn by the main series protagonist Monkey D. Luffy, his poor sketch led one of his crewmates Usopp to redesign it.

The Jolly Roger has become a symbol for global youth-led protest movements such as the August 2025 Indonesian protests where people began using the flag in lieu of the national flag as a form of protest against the government, and the practice was emulated in other countries. Notably, the flag saw widespread use during protests in Nepal and Madagascar which overthrew their respective governments. The flag has also seen use in protests in other countries across Africa, the Americas, and Eurasia.

== Straw Hat Grand Fleet ==
Straw Hat Grand Fleet
Crew	Leader		Key member(s)		
Crew	Name	Devil Fruit	Name	Role	Devil Fruit
Beautiful	Cavendish	—N/a	Suleiman	Mercenary	—N/a
Beautiful	Cavendish	—N/a	Farul	Cavendish's Pet	—N/a
Barto Club	Bartolomeo	Barrier-Barrier	Gambia	Staff officer	—N/a
Happosui Army	Sai	—N/a	Boo	Vice-leader	—N/a
Happosui Army	Sai	—N/a	Chinjao	Leader emeritus	—N/a
Ideo	Ideo	—N/a	Blue Gilly	Martial artist	—N/a
Ideo	Ideo	—N/a	Abdullah	Martial artist	—N/a
Ideo	Ideo	—N/a	Jeet	Martial artist	—N/a
Tontatta	Leo	Stitch-Stitch	Bian	Avian Squad, Pink Bee Leader	Bug-Bug: Model Hornet
Tontatta	Leo	Stitch-Stitch	Cub	Avian Squad, Yellow Kabu Leader	Bug-Bug: Model Rhinoceros Beetle
New Giant Warrior	Hajrudin	—N/a	Stansen	Shipwright	—N/a
New Giant Warrior	Hajrudin	—N/a	Rodo	Navigator	—N/a
New Giant Warrior	Hajrudin	—N/a	Goldberg	Cook	—N/a
New Giant Warrior	Hajrudin	—N/a	Gerd	Doctor	—N/a
Yontamaria Fleet	Orlumbus	—N/a	Columbus	Advisor	—N/a

The Straw Hat Grand Fleet (麦わら大船団, Mugiwara Dai-sendan) is a fleet composed of seven pirate crews, whom after having helped Luffy in Dressrosa, swore allegiance to him. A total of 5,639 pirates make up the entire fleet.^{[ch. 799,800]}

=== Beautiful Pirates ===
The Beautiful Pirates (美しき海賊団, Utsukushiki Kaizoku-dan) are the first crew of the Straw Hat Grand Fleet. Their ship is the Sleeping White Horse of the Forest.

The crew consists of a total of 74 members,^{[ch. 799]} including:

- Cavendish (キャベンディッシュ, Kyabendisshu): The captain of the Beautiful Pirates, a former prince who became a pirate, becoming a super rookie, and has a dangerous alternate personality named Hakuba. He was one of the participants in the Corrida Colosseum at Dressrosa. He hated the members of the Eleven Supernovas because they took away his popularity as a super rookie but called off his grudge against them after he is saved from imprisonment by Usopp. Cavendish is voiced by Akira Ishida in the original Japanese version and by Matt Shipman in the Funimation dub.
- Suleiman (スレイマン, Sureiman): A former mercenary who was one of the participants in the Corrida Colosseum at Dressrosa. After it, he joined Cavendish after the events in Dressrosa. Suleiman is voiced by Ken Narita in the original Japanese version and by Jordan Cruz in the Funimation dub.
- Farul (ファルル, Faruru): Cavendish' white horse.

=== Barto Club ===
The Barto Club (バルトクラブ, Baruto Kurabu) are the second crew of the Straw Hat Grand Fleet. All the members of the crew are big fans of Luffy and named their ship "Going Luffy-senpai" after him.

The crew consists of a total of 56 members,^{[ch. 799]} including:

- Bartolomeo (バルトロメオ, Barutoromeo): A former super rookie and captain of the crew who has the power to create invisible barriers around him thanks to the Barrier-Barrier Fruit. He was one of the participants in the Corrida Colosseum at Dressrosa. He is an extremely dedicated admirer of Monkey D. Luffy to the chagrin of his peers. His admiration for the Straw Hat Pirates inspired him to become a pirate, becoming a super rookie. Despite his vulgar and disrespectful demeanor, he is an altruistic and honorable individual to his friends or enemies, though this did not stop him from suffering defeat after disrespecting Shanks. Bartolomeo is voiced by Showtaro Morikubo in the original Japanese version and by Tyson Rinehart in the Funimation dub. In the live-action series, Bartolomeo is portrayed by Nahum Hughes.
- Gambia (ガンビア, Ganbia): The Barto Club's staff officer with jaguar spot tattoos on his arms. Gambia is voiced by Hiroshi Yanaka in the original Japanese version and by Blake McNamara in the Funimation dub.

=== Happosui Army ===
The Happosui Army (八宝水軍, Happō Suigun) are the third crew of the Straw Hat Grand Fleet. They have one Happosai boat that has a white tiger figurehead and seven Ipposai boats that resemble turtle ships with sea serpent figureheads.

The crew consists of a total of 1000 members,^{[ch. 799]} including:

- Sai (サイ): The leader of the Happosui Army. After a face-to-face encounter with Baby 5, he ended up marrying her. Sai is voiced by Kōichi Hashimoto in the original Japanese version and by Kyle Igneczi in the Funimation dub.
- Boo (ブー, Bū): Sai's younger brother and vice-leader of the organization. Boo is voiced by Masaya Takatsuka in the original Japanese version and by Jeff Johnson in the Funimation dub.
- Baby 5 (ベビー5, Bebī Faibu): A girl with the powers of the Arms-Arms Fruit (ブキブキの実, Buki Buki no Mi) which allows her change any part of her body into any kind of weapon. She was an officer of the Donquixote Pirates as part of the Pica Army until she later defects to the Happosui Army and marries Sai. Baby 5 is voiced by Rina Satō in the original Japanese version and by Katelyn Barr in the Funimation Dub.

Additionally, Chin Jao (チンジャオ, Chinjao), the grandfather of Sai and Boo, is the former leader of the Happosui Army. In the past she was a rival to both Monkey D. Garp and Gold Roger. He also is capable of utilizing all three types of Haki. Chin Jao is voiced by Shin Aomori in the original Japanese version and by Bradley Campbell in the Funimation dub.

=== Ideo Pirates ===
The Ideo Pirates (イデオ海賊団, Ideo Kaizokudan) are the fourth crew of the Straw Hat Grand Fleet. All of them were participants in the Corrida Colosseum at Dressrosa. Initially, they were named "XXX Gym Martial Arts Alliance" (XXXジム格闘連合, Toripuru-Ekkusu Jimu Kakutō Rengō; pronounced "Triple X Gym Martial Arts Alliance") before being renamed after obtaining their own ship.

The crew consists of four members, including:

- Ideo (イデオ): A martial artist, leader of the Ideo Pirates, and member of the Longarm Tribe with bandaged feet and calves. Ideo is voiced by Masaki Aizawa in the original Japanese version and by Eric Rolon in the Funimation dub.
- Blue Gilly (ブルー・ギリー, Burū Girī): A martial artist and member of the Longleg Tribe. Blue Gilly is voiced by Makoto Naruse in the original Japanese version and by Kellen Goff in the Funimation dub.
- Abdullah (アブドーラ, Abudōra): A former criminal and bounty hunter alongside Jeet. Abdullah is voiced by Keiji Hirai in the original Japanese version and by Sean O'Connor in the Funimation dub.
- Jeet (ジェット, Jetto): A former criminals and bounty hunter alongside Abdullah. Jeet is voiced by Koji Haramaki in the original Japanese version and by Robby Gemaehlich in the Funimation dub.

=== Tontatta Pirates ===
The Tontatta Pirates (トンタッタ海賊団, Tontatta Kaizokudan), formerly known as Tonta Corps (トンタ兵団, Tonta Heidan), are the fifth crew of the Straw Hat Grand Fleet, and the armed forces of the Tontatta Tribe. The organization is made up entirely of dwarfs and their ship is named Usoland.

The crew consists of a total of 200 members,^{[ch. 799]} including:

- Leo (レオ, Reo): The leader of the Tontatta Pirates whose Devil Fruit called the Stitch-Stitch Fruit gives him the ability to stitch and un-stitch objects together. Leo is voiced by Kurumi Mamiya in the original Japanese version and by Rachel Glass in the Funimation dub.
- Bian (ビアン): An Avian Squad leader of the Pink Bee Squad whose Devil Fruit called the Bug-Bug Fruit: Model Hornet gives her the ability to transform into a hornet or a hornet-dwarf hybrid while also granting her flight. Bian is voiced by Rie Kugimiya in the original Japanese version and by Kristen McGuire in the Funimation dub.
- Cub (カブ, Kabu): An Avian Squad leader of the Yellow Kabu Squad whose Devil Fruit called the Bug-Bug Fruit: Model Rhinoceros Beetle gives him the ability to transform into a rhinoceros beetle or a rhinoceros beetle-dwarf hybrid while also granting him flight. Cub is voiced by Masami Kikuchi in the original Japanese version. In the Funimation dub, Cub is voiced by Clay Wheeler in the "Episode of Sabo" special and by Shawn Gann in later episodes.

=== New Giant Warrior Pirates ===
The New Giant Warrior Pirates (新巨兵海賊団, Shin Kyo Hei Kaizoku-dan) are the sixth crew of the Straw Hat Grand Fleet. Their ship is called Nagifar. They worked for Buggy's Delivery prior to joining the Grand Fleet. The organization is composed of giants from the island of Elbaph, and are named after their home's original Giant Warrior Pirates.

The crew consists of a total of five members,^{[ch. 799]} including:

- Hajrudin (ハイルディン, Hairudin): The crew's captain who is the son of King Harald through the foreign giant Ida from Samuwanai Island and the half-brother of Prince Loki. Due to his illegitimate status, he suffered from prejudice since childhood and developed an ambition to unite Elbaph's giants, forming the pirate crew as a result. He despises Prince Loki for his extreme abuse, but is oblivious of his covering up of his father's death. Hajrudin is voiced by Tsuyoshi Koyama in the original Japanese version. In the Funimation dub, Hajrudin is voiced by Randy E. Aguebor in the Episode of Sabo special and episodes 639 to 658 and by Chris Guerrero in later episodes.
- Stansen (スタンセン, Sutansen): The crew's shipwright who was imprisoned at the Auction House in Sabaody until he escaped with Rayleigh. During Imu's attack on Elbaph, Stansen loses his right leg when kicking Hajrudin out of the way of one of Imu's attacks. Stansen is voiced by Eiji Takemoto in the original Japanese version and by Dan Caskey in the Funimation dub.
- Rodo (ロード, Rōdo): The crew's navigator. He imprisoned the sleeping Straw Hat Pirates into his diorama, The Land of Gods, after they passed through the Sleeping Mist between Egghead and Elbaph. He is an eccentric and perverted individual who is nevertheless a competent navigator.
- Goldberg (ゴールドバーグ, Gōrudobāgu): The crew's cook. Goldberg is voiced by Masaya Takatsuka in the original Japanese version.
  - Nash (ナッシュ, Nasshu): A shield Homie that is owned by Goldberg. He was claimed during an expedition by Goldberg's father to kill Charlotte Linlin.
- Gerd (ゲルズ, Geruzu): The crew's doctor. She and Big Mom were childhood friends until their friendship was strained when Big Mom's eating disorder for semla led to her rampage throughout Elbaph, which injured many giants. During Imu's attack on Elbaph, Gerd loses her fingertips when Imu freed St. Sommers. Gerd is voiced by Natsuko Kuwatani in the original Japanese version and by Sarah Wiedenheft in the Funimation dub.

=== Yontamaria Fleet ===
The Yontamaria Fleet (ヨンタマリア大船団, Yonta Maria Dai-sendan; lit. Yonta Maria Grand Fleet) are the seventh crew of the Straw Hat Grand Fleet. They have one Yonta Maria, five Santa Maria ships, and fifty Nita Maria ships.

The crew consists of a total of 4,300 members,^{[ch. 799]} including:

- Orlumbus (オオロンブス, Ōronbusu): A former adventurer who worked for the Standing Kingdom. He was one of the participants in the Corrida Colosseum at Dressrosa. Orlumbus is voiced by Jiro Saito in the original Japanese version and by Brandon Potter in the Funimation dub.
- Columbus (コロンブス, Koronbusu): A petite girl who is a trusted subordinate of Orlumbus.

== Allied territories ==
Two territories pledged allegiance to the Straw Hats in exchange for protection:

- Fish-Man Island: Before leaving Fish-Man Island, which after two years had been under Big Mom's protection in exchange for the sweets they made on the island, Luffy had a conversation with her stating that said territory would from that moment on be under his protection.^{[ch. 651]}
- Wano Country: As the crew prepared to leave Wano Country, Luffy gave them a copy of his Jolly Roger to symbolize that from that moment on the territory would be under his protection.^{[ch. 1057]}

== Cultural impact ==
As part of an effort to help Kumamoto Prefecture recover from the 2016 earthquakes, Oda helped set up 10 statues of the Straw Hat Pirates around the prefecture. Luffy was the first statue to be unveiled in front of the Kumamoto Prefectural Government Office on November 30, 2018. Jimbei was the last statue, unveiled at Sumiyoshi Kaigan Park on July 23, 2022.

The Straw Hats' Jolly Roger became a symbol for global youth-led protest movements such as the August 2025 Indonesian protests where people began using the flag in lieu of the national flag as a form of protest against the government ahead of the nation's 80th Independence Day, reflecting widespread discontent with the country's democratic backsliding. Indonesian authorities condemned its display as a threat to national unity, with reported instances of police and military confiscating flags during raids. The same flag was also used as a protest symbol in the 2025 Nepalese Gen Z protests, as well as in the Philippines, in France, and in Madagascar, among others. The Straw Hats are an inspiration for these protests since they are "teenagers who fight against an extremely corrupt ruling class" and consistently do this on behalf of the oppressed and marginalized. One participant in the 2025–2026 Philippine anti-corruption protests said they wanted their son to "grow up in a country that is peaceful and promotes equality. These characters did not just entertain me throughout my childhood, they taught me values and morals that somewhat made me who I am today. Of course, I'm not saying that my parents abandoned me so I just watched cartoons and anime, but these fictional characters taught me something that I did not expect will be a factor on how I perceive society as a whole and on what kind of world I would like my son to grow up in."

== See also ==
- List of One Piece characters
- List of One Piece pirates
- Four Emperors (One Piece)
- World Government (One Piece)
