= Brook (One Piece) =

One Piece franchise fictional character

- One Piece character
- Brook illustrated by Eiichiro Oda in the color spread of Chapter 726
- First appearance: One Piece chapter 442: "Adventure in the Demonic Sea" (Weekly Shōnen Jump No. 9, January 29, 2007)
- Created by: Eiichiro Oda
- Portrayed by: Martial T. Batchamen
- Voiced by: Japanese: Chō; English: Ian Sinclair
- Birthday: April 3

In-universe information
- Nicknames: Soul King Brook "Dead Bones" Brook "Humming" Brook
- Species: Human (deceased, skeleton)
- Gender: Male
- Occupation: Pirate, Musician, Swordsman (Straw-Hat Pirates; formerly captain of the Rumbar Pirates)
- Age: 38 (first death); 88 (debut); 90 (after the timeskip)
- Bounties: 383,000,000 (current); 83,000,000 (after the timeskip); 33,000,000 (when alive)
- Devil Fruit: "Revive-Revive Fruit" (English translation); Yomi Yomi no Mi (Japanese); Grants no abilities in life, but upon dying the user's soul is allowed to return to their body and live again.

Brook (Japanese: ブルック, Hepburn: Burukku), widely known as "Soul King" Brook, is a fictional character in the manga series One Piece, created and written by artist Eiichiro Oda. The character made his first appearance in the 442nd chapter of the series, which was first published in Japan in Shueisha's Weekly Shōnen Jump magazine on January 29, 2007. He is the ninth member of the Straw Hat Pirates and the eighth to join, serving as their musician. "Soul King" Brook was brought back to life by the Revive-Revive Fruit and is a world-renowned rock star who can play any instrument.

Seventy years before the present, Brook was the leader of a battle convoy in the kingdom of Esperia^{[ch. 1183]} before becoming the musician swordsman and later captain of the Rumbar Pirates. Fifty-two years before the current story, the Rumbar Pirates left their pet the infant whale Laboon at Reverse Mountain and promised Laboon that they would return for him after they circumnavigated the world.^{[ch. 487]} The Rumbar Pirates were killed in the misty Florian Triangle but Brook was brought back to life by the Devil Fruit he previously ate. Decades later, Brook loses his shadow to the pirate Gecko Moria, one of the Seven Warlords of the Sea, forcing Brook to stay out of the sunlight or face disintegration.

Five years later, Monkey D. Luffy recruits Brook to join the Straw Hats after restoring his shadow. Brook's goal is to circle the Grand Line and return to Reverse Mountain, reuniting with the whale, Laboon, and fulfilling the promise the Rumbar Pirates made. Within two years, "Soul King Brook" becomes a globally renowned rock star. Brook then returns to the Straw Hats, and steals a crucial piece of Big Mom's treasure which helps reveal the location of the One Piece. After Luffy becomes recognized as an Emperor of the Sea, Brook is named one of Luffy's nine commanders.

== Creation and conception ==
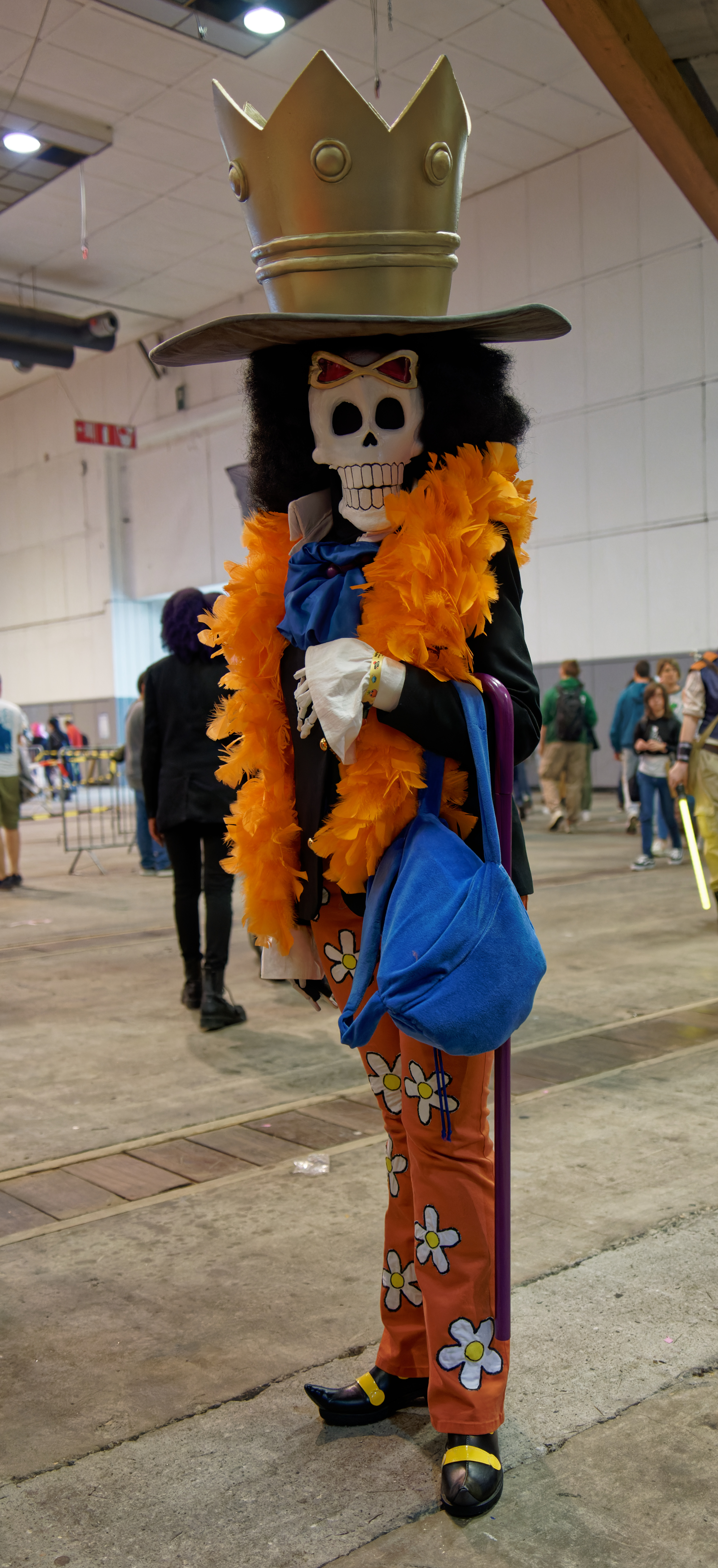
A cosplay of Brook as a member of the Straw Hats.

A living skeleton thanks to the Revive Revive Fruit, Brook "yearns to reunite with his long-lost crewmate, the whale Laboon. He is the oldest member of the crew and a skilled jokester." Brook's backstory and goal reflect the three main themes of One Piece: dreams, freedom, and friendship. Though Brook did not appear in the story until 2007, the idea of a skeleton musician was first conceived by Oda in 2000, about the time of Laboon's introduction. This was seven years before the first appearance of Brook. Oda's concept art shows Brook originally had a western cowboy hat instead of an afro. This design was later incorporated as Yorki's cowboy hat instead.

== Character outline ==
=== Personality ===
Brook is a combination of a gentlemanly persona and a perverted sort. He speaks in a dignified, educated manner at most times, but has amazingly bad manners. He burps and farts at dinner, casually asks to see women's panties, and picks at other people's food, to name only a few. He takes being a skeleton lightly, using any chance he can to joke about it. However, his backstory from Thriller Bark became the most tragic moment for Brook when he lost his crewmate along the journey before being stranded at the Florian Triangle. Brook endures his time of loneliness for fifty years by expressing his passion for music, jokes, amorous habits, and his value of life. Brook expresses his remorse for abandoning Laboon at the Twin Capes and wishes to see him again believing he had failed to fulfill his promise. When Luffy invites him to join the crew, Brook accepts his offer with tearful relief and joins the Straw Hats for his dream of reuniting with Laboon after his adventure across the Grand Line. After the Thriller Bark Arc, Brook becomes loyal to the Straw Hats on accomplishing their dreams. Despite his eccentric behavior, Brook is shown to be an extremely upright and compassionate person befitting of a true gentleman, as Brook utterly disdains wickedness and cruelty.

=== Devil Fruit Abilities ===
Brook ate the Revive-Revive Fruit, a Paramecia-type Devil Fruit which enhances the user's soul to the point where they resurrect after their first death. He can possess his own deceased body which allows him to animate his body in which he cannot feel injuries or attacks. He even demonstrated a new form of Devil Fruit ability that allows his soul to leave the body, usually by exiting his mouth and moving everywhere he wants to. After his separation from the Straw Hats, Brook learns how to use his Devil Fruit ability to leave his skeleton body and explore his surroundings as a disembodied soul.^{[ch. 629]}

He carries a shikomizue, a Japanese cane sword, and is skilled in its use. He can also combine his shikomizue and violin to create sound-based attacks. Seventy years ago, at the age of 20, he led the raider squad of the battle convoy in the kingdom of Esperia, famed for his "three-pace hum notch slash", whose speed leaves its victims unaware they have been cut.^{[ch. 1183]} Brook claims he can heal from most fractures to his body by drinking milk. His head can also be opened up and used as a storage device. Brook uses an unnamed fencing sword style and is a skilled fencer who can use quick stabs because of his skeleton anatomy. In addition to his sword skill, Brook's lightweight skeleton body gives him great speed and the ability to jump extraordinarily high. His body is so light that he is even capable of running on water. However, Brook is still powerless if submerged in water, like all Devil Fruit users, and will sink if he stops running.

=== Musical talent ===
Brook is an excellent musician, displaying the ability to play any instrument at a highly skilled level. He is usually seen playing the violin.^{[ch. 486]} Brook can even influence people with his music to the point of making them fall asleep.^{[ch. 454]} While separated from the other Straw Hats, and incognito as "Soul King" Brook, he gains world fame, filling concert halls with fans.^{[ch. 600]} He is also a skilled fencer who uses a shikomizue (a Japanese cane sword) in battle.^{[ch. 454]} His reduced weight allows him to jump extraordinarily high and to run across water.^{[ch. 443, 493]} Eventually, Brook learns how to use his Devil Fruit ability to leave his skeleton body and explore his surroundings as a disembodied soul.^{[ch. 629]}

== Appearances ==
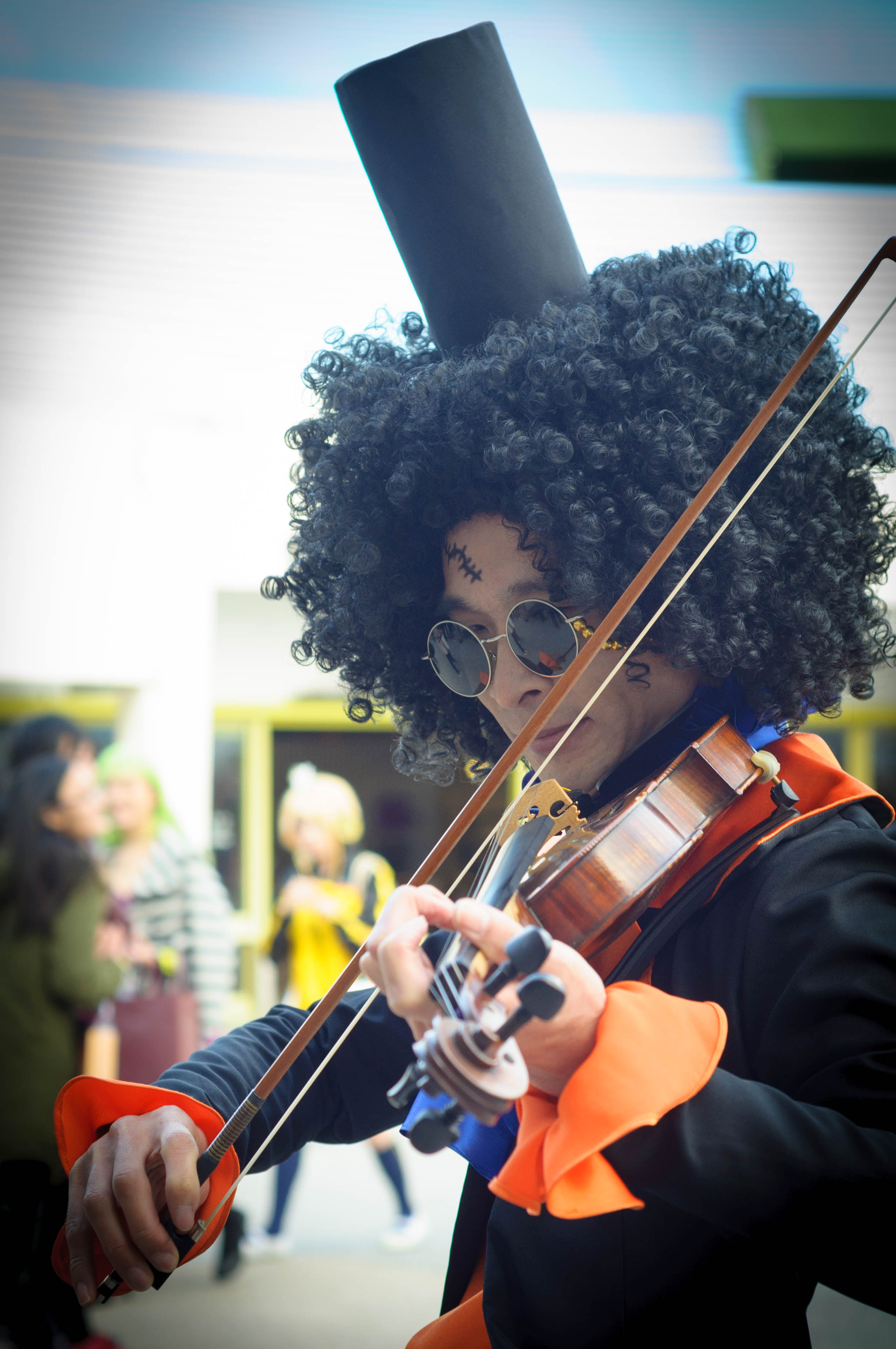
A cosplay of Brook as he appeared when he was first alive.

=== One Piece ===
Brook's backstory starts 79 years before the series' present time, when he was an orphan who lived in a landfill in the Kingdom of Esperia. He was befriended by its prince, Reuven, who feigned being a commoner and rescued him from the global authorities known as the Navy after he was caught stealing food. After Reuven took him in and sponsored his education, Brook succeeded Reuven's wife, Candelle, as the leader of a battle convoy.^{[ch. 1184]} He befriended Reuven's daughter, princess Shuri, and fell in love with her mother, Queen Candelle, despite her marriage to King Reuven. Shuri would later disappear during a visit to the World Government's capital, Marijoa, and eventually kill Reuven.^{[ch. 1183]}

After Shuri disappeared, he became the musician swordsman of the music-themed Rumbar Pirates. Already pirates before the era of Gold Roger, the Rumbar Pirates and the baby island whale Laboon enter the Grand Line. Laboon took a particular liking to "Humming Brook"'s peculiar afro and his enchanting music. Promising to return after sailing the Grand Line, the crew left Laboon with Crocus at the lighthouse at Reverse Mountain, stating that the Grand Line is too dangerous for such a small whale. The crew captain "Calico" Yorki (キャラコのヨーキ, Kyarako no Yōki) is forced to flee the Grand Line after he catches a disease, leaving Brook to be captain.

Brook's crew was slaughtered by an unknown pirate crew after they entered a mysterious, misty area of the sea known as the Florian Triangle. The Rumbar Pirates were all killed by the poisons used by an enemy pirate crew which couldn't be treated because their doctor was killed. They played one last song for Laboon as they died, which Brook recorded with the use of a Tone Dial.^{[ch. 489]} The power of the Paramecia-type Revive-Revive Fruit (ヨミヨミの実, Yomi Yomi no Mi) allowed "Dead Bones" Brook to rise again and live a second life as a skeleton.^{[ch. 443]}

Because Brook ate the Revive Revive Fruit, the spirit of his soul returned to the Grand Line. However, the soul got lost due to the intense fog in the Florian Triangle. After wandering for some time, he finally found his body which had decayed to nothing but bleached bones leaving only his afro (which remained due to strong roots). Brook was returned to life as a walking, talking skeleton. During the time he spent alone on his former crew's ship, he had almost no contact with other human beings, leading to eccentric behavior at odds with social norms and a constant urge to make bone jokes and puns.

Eight years before meeting the Straw Hat crew, he was captured by Gecko Moria, who stole his shadow and placed it in the body of the legendary samurai Ryuma. Because he could no longer be exposed to sunlight, a side effect of having no shadow in One Piece, Brook remains in the Florian Triangle, under the protective cover of the thick fog, until he meets the Straw Hat Pirates.

Fifty years later, the Straw Hats encounter Laboon and Crocus and learn the tale of the Rumbar Pirates as they enter the Grand Line. Brook is later introduced as a skeleton inhabiting the region of the Grand Line known as the Florian Triangle. Luffy invites Brook to join his crew, but Brook declines citing his inability to walk in sunlight due to his stolen shadow. After Luffy defeats Moria and returns Brook's shadow, Brook joins the Straw Hat crew, becoming their musician.^{[ch. 442]}^{[ch. 443]} Even after fifty years, Brook's goal is still to fulfill his late crew's promise after the Straw Hat Pirates go through the entirety of the Grand Line.^{[ch. 459]} Brook carries a recording of the crew, whose last survivors played their cheery song "Bink's Sake" with their dying breaths. He fears Laboon will not recognize him since he is all bones, and so prizes and protects his distinctive afro.

After being separated from the other Straw Hats by Bartholomew Kuma, and incognito as "Soul King" Brook, he gains world fame, filling concert halls with fans.^{[ch. 600]} Despite Franky speculating he might not ever return to the pirate life,^{[ch. 601]} Brook rejoins the Straw Hats after it is revealed he is a pirate.^{[ch. 602]}

On the island of Zou that is on the back of the Naitamie-Norida elephant Zunesha, Brook and the Straw Hats learn from the elders of the talking animal Mink tribe that to find the One Piece located at Laugh Tale, one must find the Four Road Poneglyphs that together reveal the coordinates to Laugh Tale. Two of these Road Poneglyphs were being held by two of the four pirate Emperors of the Sea, Big Mom and Kaido.^{[ch. 818]} Luffy and Brook later infiltrate Whole Cake Island, home to Big Mom, to recover their crewmate Sanji. Brook attempts to steal Big Mom's road poneglyph.^{[ch. 831]} In the process, he fights Big Mom and realizes his Devil Fruit matches up well against her Soul Soul power. Brook notes that acquiring the Road Poneglyph is crucial because it allows the Straw Hats to win even if Sanji did not return to the crew.^{[ch. 851]} Brook managed to steal a copy of the Road Poneglyph and hide it in his head.^{[ch. 855]} Brook later smashes Big Mom's picture of Mother Caramel, one of her only weaknesses.^{[ch. 863]} The success of the raid leads to Luffy being dubbed the "Fifth Emperor" of the Sea. Big Mom and Kaido then form an alliance to take down the Straw Hats on Wano Country, but are defeated by the Straw Hats' Ninja-Pirate-Mink-Samurai Alliance.^{[ch. 1051]} Brook becomes recognized as one of Emperor of the Sea Monkey D. Luffy's Senior Officers.^{[ch. 1058]}

After the Straw Hats reach Elbaf, Brook confronts the former Princess Shuri, now Manmayer Gunko, Holy Knight and direct servant to Nerona Imu.^{[ch. 1183]}

=== Appearances in other media ===
Brook appears in the anime adaptation of One Piece, as well as its films from the tenth onwards, being voiced by Chō in the original Japanese version and by Ian Sinclair in the English dub.

Brook is featured in several One Piece video games, in most of his appearances being part of the playable characters.

Brook appears in the episode "Good Whale Hunting" of the live-action adaptation, played by Martial T. Batchamen. He is seen in a flashback of when the Rumbar Pirates met Crocus.

== Reception ==
Brook ranked in the Top 30 of several Shōnen Jump character popularity polls, making it to the 26th position in the worldwide character popularity poll.

Brook's connection to Laboon was called "one of the most notable examples of a seemingly innocuous story beat in One Piece becoming important years later, but with it involving the backstory of a main character like Brook, it's arguably one of the most important".

Brook was called "a perfect illustration of One Piece's brilliance. So many characters initially seem silly and wacky, but turn out to have tragic backstories which give that wacky presentation a haunting gravity."

== See also ==
- Straw Hats
- List of One Piece characters
