= Lera Abova =

Russian-German actress and model (born 1992)

- Лера Абова
- Abova at the 2026 Panama Comic-Con
- Born: Valeria Smirnova; 4 November 1992 (age 34); Slavgorod, Altai Krai, Russia
- Citizenship: Russia; Germany
- Occupations: Actress; model
- Years active: 2016–present
- Modeling information
- Height: 1.75 m (5 ft 9 in)

Valeria Smirnova (Russian: Валерия Смирнова; born 4 November 1992), known professionally as Lera Abova (Лера Абова), is a Russian and German actress and model. She is best known for playing Nico Robin since the second season of Netflix's adaptation of One Piece and Chère in Honey Don't!. She also played Thea in the Pitch Perfect spin-off, Pitch Perfect: Bumper in Berlin. She has worked for modeling agencies including Select Model, Oui, and Fabbrica Milano.

== Early life ==
Abova was born 4 November 1992, and grew up in the village of Slavgorod in Siberia. When she was 13, she moved to Germany. She didn't speak German, so she used an electronic translator to communicate. She struggled to connect with her schoolmates due to the language barrier and her being from a different background. She liked to wear a pink Pokémon T-shirt and had “crazy, long hair.” After learning German, she made many friends. She dropped out of school before taking her final exams.

== Modeling ==
In 2016, she was noticed by photographer David Sims who started her career as a fashion model. She later worked with Colin Dodgson and Mariano Vivanco.

== Acting ==
In 2017, Luc Besson cast her in the role of Maude in his film Anna.

== Filmography ==
=== Film ===
Year	Title	Role	Ref(s)
2019	Anna	Maude	
2025	Exterritorial	Irina / Kira Volkova	
2025	Honey Don't!	Chère	

=== Television ===
Year	Title	Role	Notes	Ref(s)
2022	Pitch Perfect: Bumper in Berlin	Thea Krämer / DJ Das Boot		
2026–present	One Piece	Nico Robin / Miss All Sunday	Main cast (season 3); Recurring (season 2)	
TBA	Good Side of a Bad Man †	TBA		
