= Sanji (One Piece) =

Fictional character from One Piece

- One Piece character
- Sanji illustrated by Eiichiro Oda on the cover of Volume 100
- First appearance: One Piece chapter 43: "Sanji" (Weekly Shōnen Jump No. 28, June 8, 1998)
- Created by: Eiichiro Oda
- Portrayed by: Taz Skylar (live-action television series); Christian Convery (live-action television series; young); Hayato Nakamura (Super Kabuki II: One Piece)
- Voiced by: Japanese; Hiroaki Hirata; Ikue Ōtani (young); English; Eric Vale (Funimation); Christen Auten (Funimation; young); Megan Shipman (Funimation; young, 2019+); David Moo (4Kids Entertainment); Veronica Taylor (4Kids Entertainment; young); Joseph Murray (Odex); Paul Pistore (Odex)
- Birthday: March 2

In-universe information
- Full name: Vinsmoke Sanji
- Alias: Black Leg
- Relatives: Zeff (foster father); Vinsmoke Judge (father); Vinsmoke Sora (mother); Vinsmoke Reiju (older sister); Vinsmoke Ichiji (quadruplet brother); Vinsmoke Niji (quadruplet brother); Vinsmoke Yonji (quadruplet brother)
- Occupation: Pirate; Sous-chef (formerly); Prince (renounced)
- Affiliation: Straw Hat Pirates (cook); Baratie Restaurant (former sous-chef); Germa Kingdom (abandoned); Ninja-Pirate-Mink-Samurai Alliance (Disbanded)
- Age: 19 (debut); 21 (after the timeskip)
- Bounties: 1,032,000,000 (current); 330,000,000 (third); 177,000,000 (second; Only Alive); 77,000,000 (first)

Sanji (サンジ, Sanji), born as Vinsmoke Sanji (ヴィンスモーク・サンジ, Vinsumōku Sanji) and also known as "Black Leg" Sanji (黒足のサンジ, Kuro Ashi no Sanji), is a fictional character in the One Piece franchise created by Eiichiro Oda. The character made his first appearance in the 43rd chapter of the series, which was first published in Japan in Shueisha's Weekly Shōnen Jump magazine on June 8, 1998. He is the fifth member of the Straw Hat Pirates and the fourth to join, serving as their cook.

A native to the North Blue, Sanji grew up as part of the Vinsmoke family under his father Vinsmoke Judge, king of the fallen Germa Kingdom, and mother Vinsmoke Sora. After leaving his abusive family and surviving a shipwreck, he was taken under the wing of "Red Foot" Zeff, a former pirate and owner of the floating restaurant Baratie who taught him cooking and his fighting style, which is characterized by the use of legs in combat, leaving his hands for cooking. Following a battle against Don Krieg, Sanji joins the Straw Hats in order to fulfill his dream of finding the All Blue, a mythical sea said to have fish from around the world. Despite his calm and rational nature, he is known for his constantly enamored behavior around beautiful women (especially Nami), to the point he refuses to attack women to the crew's and his own detriment.

== Creation and conception ==
Early designs show that, originally, Sanji was going to be a gun-wielding black-haired character named Naruto but that idea was scrapped, to avoid confusion with Masashi Kishimoto's Naruto that was being released at the same time.

Oda was inspired by Mr. Pink, Steve Buscemi's character in Reservoir Dogs (1992), when creating Sanji.

=== Design ===
Sanji is a tall, light-skinned, slender man who has a small waist. He commonly wears a black shirt and smokes a cigarette. Before the timeskip, Sanji is seen with his blonde hair covering his left eye. After the timeskip, his hair covers his right eye. Before leaving his family, Sanji styled his hair in the opposite direction and wore a yellow shirt with a black number three on it. He also wore white pants, brown boots, and a yellow bandana. After leaving his family and still a child, he started wearing a white cook's uniform. Sanji grows a goatee during the timeskip, and concept art shows this was his original design.

Sanji's most distinctive feature is his eyebrows, which are characterized as swirls with the tail end pointing at his left side, opposite in direction in comparison to his siblings Ichiji, Niji, Yonji, and Reiju.

Oda revealed Sanji's real-world nationality would be a Frenchman, in contrast to the Nazi Germany themes of Germa 66.

=== Personality ===
Sanji is mostly seen as a composed, nonchalant, and calm individual who always keeps his cool when in dire situations. This is contrasted by the many comedic gags he partakes in, such as when in the presence of a lady or when insulted by a crew member. Most notably, Sanji and Zoro have a great rivalry, often resorting to fighting (both verbally and physically).

Sanji is also known to have an enamored personality, constantly flirting with any attractive woman he sees, earning him the nickname "ero-cook". Even as a child, while working in the Baratie, Sanji would become love-struck with attractive female customers and end up making mistakes in the process of cooking. He also shows jealousy towards those that he perceives to be luckier than him with women, such as when he sees Zoro with Hiyori and Luffy arriving at Amazon Lily out of pure luck. Despite this nature, Sanji exhibits some self-restraint due to his loyalty to his crew, as is shown by the fact that in spite of being attracted to Pudding, he sternly refused to marry her and decided to let her down gently. Moreover, due to this attitude and the multiple lectures from Zeff, Sanji follows his own strict set of personal morals in the form of chivalry. He has sworn to never attack women or let them be insulted, even at the cost of his own life and has gone so far as to only block against Kalifa, one of the main antagonists of the Enies Lobby Arc, until Nami could help him. Sanji overcomes his childhood trauma and accepts his nature after Luffy saves him from an arranged marriage during the Whole Cake Island Arc.

Sanji is kind and often saves others in danger, even at the cost of his own safety. Oftentimes he frames this kindhearted nature as mere chivalry towards women, but in his actions he consistently helps men as well. Having suffered from starvation among the litany of abuse put upon him by his father, he never denies a person a meal regardless of their intentions, as shown when Don Krieg attempted to take over the Baratie during his introductory arc. Frequently during the series he separates himself from everyone else to play a clandestine role which subsequently helps the crew and other allies survive. For example, in Rainbase, in the kingdom of Alabasta, he calls himself Mr Prince and lures Crocodile away from his crew. Additionally, in Water 7, Sanji separates from the crew and finds Nico Robin boarding the Puffing Tom on its way to Enies Lobby for her execution. In Thriller Bark, he offers to give up his life in exchange for Luffy's. In Zou, Sanji decided to leave the crew in order to confront his family and protect the Straw Hats from the Fire Tank Pirates. In Wano, Sanji asks for help from another for the first time when he asks Robin to save him.

=== Portrayals ===
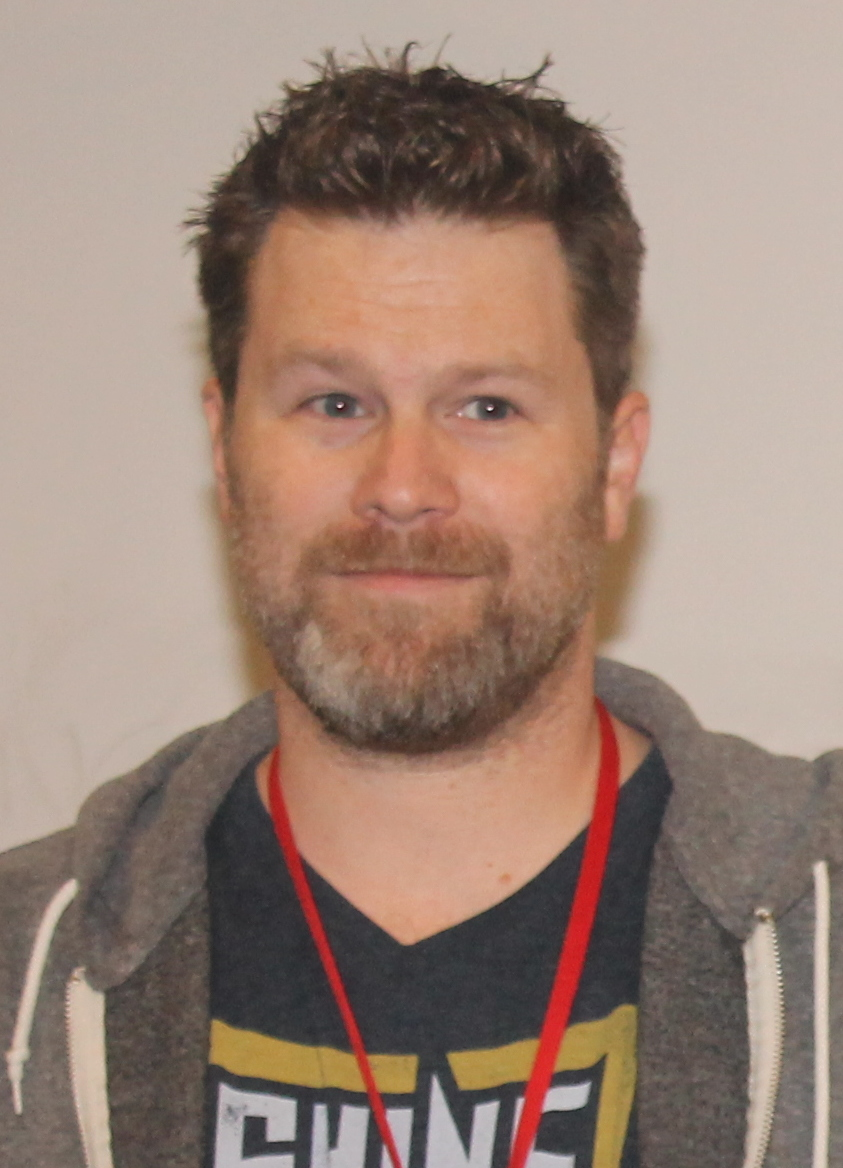
Eric Vale voiced Sanji in the Funimation English dub of the anime series.

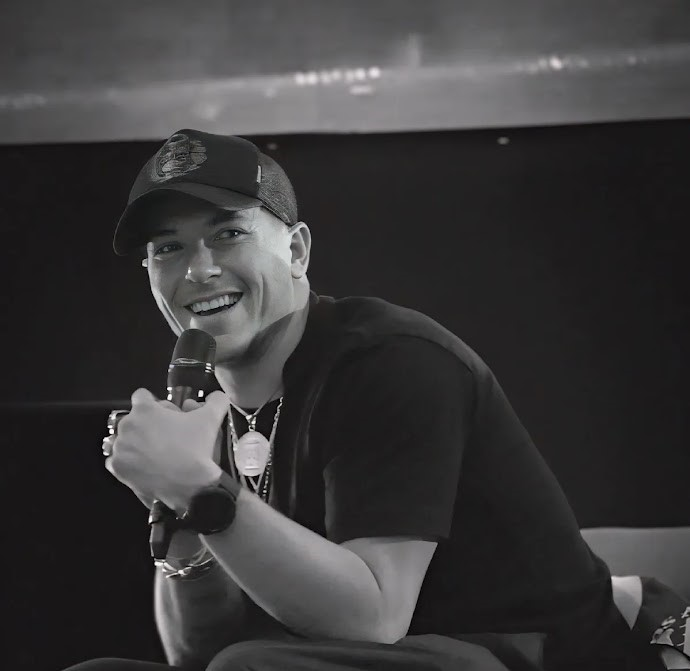
Taz Skylar portrays Sanji in the live action series.

In the original Japanese version of the One Piece anime series, Sanji is voiced by Hiroaki Hirata as an adult and Ikue Ōtani as a child.

In Odex's dubs of the first 104 episodes of One Piece in Singapore, Sanji was voiced by Joseph Murray and Paul Pistore. In the 4kids Entertainment's dub of the first 104 episodes of One Piece, Sanji was voiced by David Moo as an adult and by Veronica Taylor as a child. In Funimation Entertainment's dubs of the entire One Piece franchise, adult Sanji is voiced by Eric Vale with Christen Auten playing the role of child Sanji. In the Korean dub, he was formerly voiced by Park Hyun-wook from 2002 to 2011. In 2012, Sanji was now voiced by Lee Jung-hoon, Nami Sanji-kun's husband in the Korean dub.

Sanji is portrayed by British-Spanish actor Taz Skylar in the live action adaptation of One Piece, while Christian Convery portrays young Sanji. Skylar would spend four hours training in the morning and cooked dishes for the same amount of time before going to stretch his legs in the sauna, also performing his own stunts during the show despite sustaining injuries from his training. The physical strain would weigh on him: "I finished the first season with so many injuries, my knees felt like they were made of legos and held together by cello tape." The live-action version of Sanji does not have the character's trademark curly eyebrow. Showrunner Steven Maeda recalled passionate debates over including it, but eventually it was "decided to not use the curlicue eyebrow as a way just to ground the show and make it feel more real. And that was certainly what was done across the various departments." Skylar credited the role with giving him more career opportunities.

=== Abilities ===
When fighting, Sanji only ever relies on kicks, never punching opponents because of his belief that a cook's hands are important instruments for their craft, and thus must be protected from harm. The only time when Sanji ever uses his hands to fight an enemy is in the Water 7 arc, where he allows himself to use cooking knives against Wanze because Wanze's armour consists of food (noodles). Over the course of the series, Sanji utilizes attacks that are variations of kicks (deemed "Black Leg Style"), with the name of the attack usually having something to do with food, such as "Diable Jambe", wherein he raises the temperatures of his legs so high that they glow bright red. During his time on Momoiro Island, Sanji learns a move named "Sky Walk", an ability which allows him to step on air as if it were solid, which allows him to jump to great heights and float in midair. Sanji is one of the few high-bounty individuals that has not consumed a Devil Fruit, fruits that give the consumer superhuman powers at the expense of becoming weakened to the point of total incapacitation in water. After Whole Cake Island, Sanji receives a Raid Suit gifted from Germa 66, the underground organization powering Germa Kingdom, which increases his physical capabilities and allows him to blend in with his environment. Though continued use of this suit awakened his inert genetic modifications, he ultimately accepted these modifications, giving him increased strength and speed, but chose to destroy the Raid Suit to cut his ties to his family permanently. He would later use his new abilities with Armament Haki to create "Ifrit Jambe", a more powerful version of Diable Jambe that uses blue-white flames.

- Other than fighting skills, Sanji is also a well-renowned cook, and has regularly proved he is one of the best in the world after winning numerous cooking competitions. He learned to cook under Zeff on the Baratie and has become quick and dexterous in his ability to use knives. He also has a strong sense of taste and smell, which is seen by being able to deduce the ingredients and being able to recreate the wedding cake on Whole Cake Island.

=== Haki ===
During the timeskip, he develops Observation Haki, which allows him to sense the intent and presence of others, such as when he was able to dodge a jelly bean bullet from Katakuri. He is also able to utilize Armament Haki, which allows him to harden parts of his body and be able to attack Logia users. During the Elbaf arc, Sanji is able to break through his mental barrier and infuse one of his kicks with Supreme King Haki against one of the God's knights: Saint Rimoshifu Killingham.

== Appearances ==
=== One Piece manga ===
Vinsmoke Sanji (ヴィンスモーク・サンジ, Vinsumōku Sanji) was born as a prince of Germa Kingdom, a floating kingdom composed of several ships on the shells of large snails. Vinsmoke Judge sought to regain the family's long lost glory by creating the strongest army, using his expertise as a scientist to create hundreds of clones of his best soldiers. Blinded by the pursuit of power, he even experimented on his five children. Sora, who didn't like that they would practically become inhuman, tried to undo said experiments by taking a powerful drug. However, amongst them, only Sanji was affected by this, being the only one without any powers and with the ability to feel emotions; as such, Judge heavily resented Sanji, deeming him a "failure" and imprisoning him; Sanji was also perpetually tortured and bullied by his brothers. With help from his sister Reiju, he escapes and flees Germa 66. On his way out, Sanji encounters his father, who demands him to keep his heritage a secret in shame. Sanji eventually flees on a cruise ship known as the Orbit.

While serving as an apprentice cook on a passenger ship, nine-year-old Sanji stands up to a boarding party of pirates led by the infamous "Red Foot" Zeff. During the encounter, Sanji is swept into the sea by a massive wave. Zeff jumps in after him because of their common dream of finding the All Blue (オールブルー, Ōru Burū), a legendary area where the East, West, North, and South Blue seas meet, containing every kind of fish in the world. While castaways together, the pirate saves Sanji's life yet again by giving him all of their food. After their eventual rescue, Sanji stays with Zeff for several years and helps him build a floating restaurant, the Baratie (バラティエ). Zeff in turn makes him a first-rate cook and teaches him his kick-based fighting style.^{[ch. 56–59]} Mirroring Zeff, Sanji will never refuse a starving person a meal, and he uses only his legs when fighting to protect the hands he needs for cooking.^{[ch. 48, 370]} He has a weakness for women and makes it a principle never to harm one, even if it means his death.^{[ch. 403]} Eventually, Sanji leaves the Baratie to pursue his own dream and join the Straw Hats, after a chance encounter lead to their defeat of Don Krieg.^{[ch. 62]}

Eventually, Sanji becomes infamous as "Black Leg" Sanji (黒脚のサンジ, Kuro Ashi no Sanji) from his misadventures with the Straw Hats; a poorly drawn bounty poster resembling an individual named Duval, leading to conflict between the two; Sanji displays kindness by rearranging his facial expression. ^{[ch. 435,492]} In Thriller Bark, he offers to give up his life in exchange for Luffy's. While training for a period of two years in Emporio Ivankov's Kamabakka Queendom (カマバッカ王国, Kamabakka Ōkoku), he develops the Sky Walk (空中歩行(スカイ・ウォーク), Sukai Wōku), a variant of the Six Powers (六式, Rokushiki) technique Moonwalk (月歩, Geppo), which allows him to essentially run through air.^{[ch. 635]} After the crew reunites, and travel to Fish-Man Island, Sanji has a nosebleed eruption that leaves him in a critical state. He is saved via a blood donation from Splash and Splatter, and later defeats Wadatsumi of the Sun Pirates. After the crew are separated in Punk Hazard, Sanji meets Kin'emon, a samurai of Wano Country, and is placed in Nami's body by Trafalgar Law. He helps find the rest of Kin'emon's body, is returned to his original body, and fights Vergo before the latter has to leave. In Dressrosa, Sanji becomes enamored with Donquixote Pirate member Viola, and his kind words lead to her switching sides. Law saves Sanji from being killed by Doflamingo, and Sanji leaves with half the crew for Zou.

In Zou, Sanji is forced into an arranged marriage with the daughter of Big Mom, one of the Four Emperors. Sanji decides to leave the crew in order to confront his family and protect the Straw Hats from the Big Mom Pirates. The Straw Hats invades the Big Mom Pirates' Empire to save Sanji. Germa 66 places handcuffs on Sanji that will explode his hands in the event he tries leaving, and Judge threatens to kill Zeff if Sanji does not obey. When Luffy and Nami catch up to him, Sanji attacks Luffy and proclaims he will not return. Sanji decides to go through with marrying Pudding, but discovers the latter and the Big Mom Pirates plan to kill him and his family and take their technology at the wedding. After Sanji reconciles with Luffy and confesses that he wants to remain with the crew while also being able to save Zeff and his family, Luffy devises to crash the wedding. Sanji protects Pudding during the fallout, his kindness toward her third-eye getting her to switch sides, and frees his family from their binding by Charlotte Perospero. His siblings help protect the Straw Hats, and they are chased by a deranged Big Mom craving a wedding cake. Sanji bakes a large wedding cake with help from Pudding, and after Big Mom eats it, the crew manages to get away. After their escape, Sanji is pleased that his bounty exceeds Zoro's, but angered at the inclusion of his surname in the poster. Sanji is also displeased to receive his own technologically enhanced Raid Suit from his family which grants him the ability to turn invisible.^{[ch. 903]}

In Wano, Sanji disguises himself as a local running a noodle stand, uses his Raid Suit to fight Page One, and helps Zoro save Toko. During the raid on Onigashima, Sanji withstands an attack from King while trying to save Momonosuke, and gets captured by Black Maria through her female subordinates, which leads to him asking for help from another for the first time when he asks Robin to save him from Black Maria. Sanji fights Queen, and after taking little damage, destroys the Raid Suit out of fear of what it could turn him into, and defeats Queen with his newly learned attack, the Boeuf Burst. In Egghead, Sanji protects Nami from S-Shark, the Seraphim unit based on crewmate Jinbe, and defends Jewelry Bonney from Kizaru. Per Luffy's request, Sanji, Jinbe, and Bonney attack him to power him up, giving him the power to send Marcus Mars flying away.

=== In other media ===
The creators of Food Wars, Yūto Tsukuda and Shun Saeki, created a set of spinoff one-shots titled Shokugeki no Sanji, with the first installment being published in 2018 to celebrate One Piece's 21st anniversary. There are currently four installments and the spinoffs are short stories detailing different cooking competitions that Sanji partakes in, as well as going into detail about his training in Okama Island.

A cookbook titled One Piece: Pirate Recipes was published by Shueisha in November 2012. The book is attributed to Sanji himself and includes various One Piece-themed cooking recipes. A localization by Viz Media was announced in February 2021, and released on November 23, 2021.

Sanji has also been featured in varying forms of merchandise. For instance, many figurines have been produced, with one example being the Sanji figure in the One Piece Locations Trading Figures series. In 2012, the French Luxury brand S.T Dupont collaborated on their 140th anniversary with Eiichiro Oda to recreate Sanji's iconic "Sleeping Mermaid" gold lighter.

Statues have also been erected in Sanji's honor. A bronze statue of Sanji was dedicated in Mashiki, Kumamoto as part of the Kumamoto Revival Project to help with healing after the 2016 earthquakes in the area. In the Nagoya location of the One Piece Mugiwara Store, a statue of Sanji stands next to artwork from the show. In "Sanji's Oresama Restaurant," one of the Tokyo One Piece Tower's restaurants, a statue of Sanji can be seen as part of a feast with the rest of the crew.

== Reception ==
=== Popularity ===
In the Shōnen Jump One Piece popularity polls, Sanji was ranked fourth in the first poll (1999) and third for the three subsequent polls (2002, 2006, 2009). In the most recent poll (2021), which was the first polled held worldwide, Sanji was ranked the fourth most popular character with 970,286 votes.

=== Critical response ===
Dyler Crews wrote how "Sanji has all of the tangibles to be one of the undisputed best characters in the entire series. His origin, powers, and style make him an easy favorite among One Piece fans. Still, his strange obsession with women pushes other fans away. The lecherous hero is as foundational to the shonen manga genre as gaudy transformations. Sanji is the most visible in a long line of problematic and confounding characters to express this annoyingly immature personality type".

Eric Vale's work with Sanji nominated him for the "Voice Actor of the Year" award in the Behind the Voice Actor Awards from 2015. Reviewing One Piece Film: Z, Kyle Millis praised Vale and Nami voice actress Luci Christian as "two of the best Voice Actors working today, and they deliver great work as usual." Daniel Dockery, a senior staff writer for Crunchyroll, argued that Sanji has one of the best character introductions in anime. Ritwik Mitra of GameRant placed Sanji as the best comedy relief character in shōnen anime, citing his attempts at courting women and conflicts with his crew mate Roronoa Zoro as a source of humor. Mitra adds that Sanji is also a significant part in "some of the most iconic non-comedy moments", which he believes to be reason for his popularity. Emma Jane-Betts calls Sanji "irreplaceable and a definite scene-stealer" due to his unique fighting skills and suaveness.

Lucas Kloberdanz-Dyck assessed Sanji as the Straw Hat with the most character development, and Dylan Stevens-Foster called his backstory "one of the most tragic in the series." Sean Cubillas opined that Sanji feeding Gin despite the latter having no money was the moment "that defined Sanji's character and got everyone to fall in love with him." His fight against Jabra of CP9 is viewed as one of the best in the series. Sanji's role in the Whole Cake Island arc was well-received for revealing the backstory of his family, and his moral dilemma of having to choose between his loyalty to the Straw Hats and commitments to his family.

Commentators have praised Taz Skylar's portrayal of Sanji in the live-action adaptation. Kirsten Carey praised the natural charm of Skylar as "a huge asset to the character", noting that his flirting was "backed up by his boyish earnestness." Jesse Lab opined that Skylar's performance was fine "but his introduction and characterization are rushed through so the show can set up its season finale". David Opie found Sanji to be overlooked compared to the other Straw Hats in the second season, and Lyra Hale wrote that she would have loved to have learned "a little bit more about Sanji and what this journey means for him."

== See also ==
- Straw Hats
- List of One Piece characters
