= World Government (One Piece) =

Main antagonist organization of One Piece

- One Piece organization
- Flag of the World Government
- Created by: Eiichiro Oda
- Founded: 800 years ago c. 700 Age of the Sea Circle
- Location: Blue Planet
- Leader: Nerona Imu
- Key people: Five Elders: Topman Warcury; Ethanbaron V. Nusjuro; Marcus Mars; Shepherd Ju Peter; Figarland Garling; Jaygarcia Saturn (former); Holy Knights of God: Figarland Shamrock; Manmayer Gunko; Shepherd Sommers; Rimoshifu Killingham; Commander-in-Chief: Kong; Fleet Admiral: Sakazuki (Akainu)
- Affiliations: Over 170 countries Seven Warlords of the Sea (former)
- Subsidiaries: Marines; Cipher Pol
- Capital: Mary Geoise, Red Line
- Marine Admirals: Borsalino (Kizaru); Issho (Fujitora); Aramaki (Ryokugyū)
- CP-0 Masked Assassins: Rob Lucci; Kaku

The World Government (Japanese: 世界政府, Hepburn: Sekai Seifu) is a fictional global empire that rules over the world of One Piece by Eiichiro Oda. The World Government is affiliated with over 170 nations from around the world^{[ch. 398]} and is led by Nerona Imu. Its greatest enemies are pirates, such as the Straw Hats, and the Revolutionary Army, who unlike most pirates directly oppose the Government. The World Government is very powerful with many armies stationed around the globe.

Eight centuries after its foundation by a group of twenty kings known as the First 20 (最初の20人, Sekai Seifu),^{[ch. 497]} their descendants, the Celestial Dragons, live luxurious lives and abuse their power.^{[ch. 498]} The capital of the World Government is the Holy Land of Marijoa (マリージョア, Marījoa; Mary Geoise) and its governing headquarters is Pangaea Castle (パンゲア城, Pangea-jō) where there is an Empty Throne (虚の玉座, Kara no Gyokuza) said to symbolize that not a single person from any of the twenty families of Celestial Dragons can rule the world, but in actuality used by Imu.^{[ch. 396]}^{[ch. 763]}^{[ch. 907]}^{[ch. 908]}

The top leaders of the Government such as Imu, the Five Elders, the Holy Knights of God, and the commander-in-chief Kong reside and govern from Mary Geoise, which is also the jurisdiction of the Holy Knights of God,^{[ch. 1054]} and the home of the Celestial Dragons. Every four years, the royals of nations that are members of the Government assemble in Pangaea Castle to host the Reverie (世界会議, Reverī; Levely).^{[ch. 906]}

The World Government initially controls two of the three types of great powers in One Piece: the Marines, described as the public face of the government, and the Seven Warlords of the Sea, allied privateers who hunt other pirates. The Government also includes other military forces such as the ten Cipher Pol intelligence agencies. Two years after the story begins, the Seven Warlords are abolished and replaced with clones made from their Bloodline Elements (血統因子, Kettō Inshi; Lineage Factor), as the World Government begins to more aggressively confront the strongest pirates known as the Four Emperors of the Sea as well as the Revolutionary Army.

== Celestial Dragons ==
The World Nobles (世界貴族, Sekai Kizoku), also known as the Celestial Dragons (天竜人, Tenryūbito; lit. "Heavenly Dragon Folk"), are a group of aristocratic elites that make up nineteen bloodlines residing in Marijoa^{[ch. 142]} and are descendants of the First 20 with the exception of the Nefertari family. However, due to their connection to the World Government, they constantly abuse their power and despise the people below them (referring to them as "commoners") to the point of wearing enclosed helmets with supplied oxygen so as not to breathe the same air as them.^{[ch. 499]}

=== First Twenty ===
==== St. Nerona Imu ====
St. Nerona Imu is the King of the World and creator of the World Government.

St. Nerona Imu (ネロナ・イム聖, Nerona Imu Sei) is the King of the World and creator of the World Government. Imu is a devil-like man with pale hair, dark skin and horns, who wields a giant serpent spear called Nemesis.^{[ch. 1179]} His existence is kept secret from the world and much within the Government that if anyone witnesses his existence, they are assassinated.^{[ch. 908]}^{[ch. 1085]} Imu holds an intense hatred towards those who bear the "Will of D", in addition to Joy Boy, an adversary whose defeat by Imu led to the spread of Poneglyphs among a series of failures.^{[ch. 1181]}^{[ch. 1188]}

Imu ate a Devil Fruit that is aptly named Devil's Fruit, which gives him the ability to transform into an enormous devil. In his devil form, Imu is immortal and can generate fire, teleport, heal others, create arrowhead-shaped appendages, summon weapons, create Haki-proof forcefields, and transform others into demons. Imu is able to wield both Conquerer's Haki and Observation Haki, and most likely can use Armament Haki.^{[ch. 1179]}

==== Nefertari D. Lili ====
Nefertari D. Lili (ネフェルタリ・D・リリィ, Neferutari Dī Rirī) was the Queen of the Kingdom of Alabasta 800 years ago and one of the First Twenty monarchs who created the World Government. Alone out of the 20 founding families, she chose not to move to Mary Geoise but to return to Alabasta. However, she never returned home and her younger brother succeeded her as the ruler of Alabasta.^{[ch. 1084]}^{[ch. 1085]}

==== Named weapons ====
19 weapons were laid down around the Empty Throne to commemorate the vow that none of the kings would seek dominion over the others. They include:

1. Tohu, Blade of Chaos
2. Vohu, Blade of Nothingness
3. Nemesis
4. Longinus, Lance (Rimoshifu family)
5. Stigma, Blade of Hatred
6. Muramasa
7. Gram, Blade (Shepherd family)
8. Fragarach, Blade of the Sea God
9. Axe of Xingtian
10. Honebami, Bone Eater

=== Five Elders ===
Five Elders
Name	Role	Planet	Yōkai form	Notes
St. Jaygarcia Saturn	Science & Defense	Saturn	Gyuki	Killed by Imu after Egghead events
St. Marcus Mars	Environment	Mars	Itsumade	
St. Topman Warcury	Justice	Mercury	Fengxi	
St. Ethanbaron V. Nusjuro	Finance	Venus	Bakotsu	
St. Shepherd Ju Peter	Agriculture	Jupiter	Sandworm	
St. Figarland Garling	Science & Defense	Crescent moon	?	Replaced Saturn after Egghead events

The Five Elders (五老星, Gorōsei) are the official highest authorities of the World Government and are loyal to Imu.^{[ch. 233]} Each of them are in charge of a political field in the Government. The Elders are greatly concerned about protecting the unbalanced world from the influence of piracy and preserving the World Government's public image, even goes as far as covering up its tyrannical nature and reputation from the general public.^{[ch. 907]}

They all appear to have eaten Mythical Zoan Devil Fruits which allow them to transform into creatures originating from East Asian mythology and folklore.

==== St. Jaygarcia Saturn ====
St. Jaygarcia Saturn (ジェイガルシア・サターン聖, Jeigarushia Satān Sei)^{[ch. 1073]} is the Godhead of Science & Defense (科学防衛武神, Kagaku Bōei Bushin; Warrior God of Science & Defense) in the World Government,^{[ch. 1086]} who ate an unidentified Mythical Zoan Devil Fruit that allows him to transform into a gyuki (an ox/spider Yōkai). Saturn can wield both Kenbunshoku and Haōshoku Haki. In the aftermath of the Egghead Incident, Saturn is killed by a wrathful Imu for letting "Joy Boy" escape and is succeeded by Garling as one of the Five Elders.^{[ch. 1125]}

Saturn is voiced by Keiichi Noda in the original Japanese version. In the Funimation dub, he is voiced by Jerry Russell in earlier episodes and by J.B. Edwards starting in Episode 511.

==== St. Figarland Garling ====
St. Figarland Garling (フィガーランド・ガーリング聖, Figārando Gāringu Sei) is the supreme commander of the Holy Knights, a member of the Figarland Family (フィガーランド家, Figārando-ke) of Celestial Dragons, and was a champion during the God Valley Incident (ゴッドバレー事件, Goddo Barē Jiken)/ Garling is given the authority to pass judgment on others, even his fellow Celestial Dragons.^{[ch. 1086]} He is the father of twin sons Figarland Shamrock and Shanks of the Four Emperors.

In the aftermath of the Egghead Incident, Garling was chosen by Imu to replace Saturn as the new Godhead of Science & Defense (科学防衛武神, Kagaku Bōei Bushin; Warrior God of Science & Defense), becoming one of the Five Elders.^{[ch. 1125]}

==== St. Marcus Mars ====
St. Marcus Mars (マーカス・マーズ聖, Mākasu Māzu Sei) is the Godhead of Environment (環境武神, Kankyō Bushin; Warrior God of Environment) in the World Government,^{[ch. 1086]} who ate an unidentified Mythical Zoan Devil Fruit that allows him to transform into an itsumade (a reptilian/bird Yōkai). Mars can wield both Kenbunshoku and Haōshoku Haki.

Mars is voiced by Keiichi Sonobe in earlier episodes of the original Japanese version and by Masato Hirano starting in Episode 277 of the original Japanese version. In the Funimation dub, he is voiced by Randy Pearlman.

==== St. Topman Warcury ====
St. Topman Warcury (トップマン・ウォーキュリー聖, Toppuman Wōkyurī Sei) is the Godhead of Justice (法務武神, Hōmu Bushin; Warrior God of Justice) in the World Government,^{[ch. 1086]} who ate an unidentified Mythical Zoan that allows him to transform into a fengxi (a boar-like yaoguai). Warcury can wield both Kenbunshoku and Haōshoku Haki.

Warcury is voiced by Masato Hirano in the original Japanese version and by Kurt Kleinmann in the Funimation dub.

==== St. Ethanbaron V. Nusjuro ====
St. Ethanbaron V. Nusjuro (イーザンバロン・V・ナス寿郎聖, Īzanbaron Bui Nasujurō Sei) is the Godhead of Finance (財務武神, Zaimu Bushin; Warrior God of Finance) in the World Government,^{[ch. 1086]} who ate an unidentified Mythical Zoan that him to transform into a bakotsu (a flaming skeletal horse Yōkai). In addition, Nusjuro can use all three types of Haki.

Nusjuro is voiced by Kenichi Ogata in the original Japanese version. In the Funimation dub, he is voiced by Kent Williams and Doug Jackson.

==== St. Shepherd Ju Peter ====
St. Shepherd Ju Peter (シェパード・十・ピーター聖, Shepādo Jū Pītā Sei) is the Godhead of Agriculture (農務武神, Nōmu Bushin; Warrior God of Agriculture) in the World Government,^{[ch. 1086]} who ate an unidentified Mythical Zoan that allows him to transform into a sandworm. Peter is also able to wield Kenbunshoku Haki.

Peter is voiced by Yasunori Masutani in the original Japanese version and by Michael Johnson in the Funimation dub.

=== Holy Knights of God ===
The Holy Knights of God (神の騎士団, Kami no Kishidan; Knights of God) are an order of elite knights under the command of Garling who operate within Marijoa.^{[ch. 1086]} They are the only authorized military, law enforcement, and security force in the World Government higher than even the Marines itself. One of their responsibilities is to sort disputes between Celestial Dragons.^{[ch. 1054]} Like the Five Elders, they utilize the magical Abyss ability. The Holy Knights are immortal, but can be injured by Supreme King Haki, which slows their recovery.

==== St. Figarland Shamrock ====
St. Figarland Shamrock (フィガーランド・シャムロック聖, Figārando Shamurokku Sei) is a commander of the Holy Knights, a Celestial Dragon of the Figarland Family, Garling's son, and Shanks' older twin brother. Shamrock wields a saber called Cerberus, which "ate" a Devil Fruit that enables it to transform into a Cerberus.

St. Figarland Shamrock is voiced by Shūichi Ikeda in episode 887 of the original Japanese version and by Kenjiro Tsuda in the later episodes. In the Crunchyroll dub, he is voiced by Brandon Potter.

==== St. Manmayer Gunko ====
St. Manmayer Gunko (マンマイヤー・軍子宮, Manmaiyā Gunko Gū) is a Holy Knight and a Celestial Dragon of the Manmayer Family. She previously ate the Arrow-Arrow Fruit, which enables her to emit arrow-headed bandage strips. Gunko is later revealed to be Shuri, a princess from Espiria Kingdom who was brainwashed into serving Imu and has a history with Brook.

St. Manmayer Gunko is voiced by Sumire Uesaka in the original Japanese version.

==== St. Shepherd Sommers ====
St. Shepherd Sommers (シェパード・ソマーズ聖, Shepādo Somāzu Sei) is a muscular, elderly Holy Knight and a Celestial Dragon of the Shepard Family. He ate the Thorn-Thorn Fruit, which enables him to generate thorny vines from his body.

St. Shepherd Sommers is voiced by Hiroki Yasumoto in the original Japanese version.

==== St. Rimoshifu Killingham ====
St. Rimoshifu Killingham (リモシフ・キリンガム聖, Rimoshifu Kiringamu Sei) is a clumsy and narcoleptic Holy Knight and a Celestial Dragon of the Rimoshifu Family who ate the Dragon-Dragon Fruit: Model Qilin, which gives him the ability to transform into a Qilin. Killingham can also manipulate dreams and create nightmare-based monsters, referred to as MMAs.

St. Rimoshifu Killingham is voiced by Shinnosuke Tachibana in the original Japanese version.

==== St. Satchels Maffey ====
St. Satchels Maffey (マッフィー宮, Maffī Gū) is a massive, horned female member of the Holy Knights who took part in the God Valley incident. Through an unknown means, she can fire a laser from her mouth.^{[ch. 1160]}

=== Donquixote Family ===
The Hoof of the Flying Dragon is the symbol of the Celestial Dragons.

- Donquixote Doflamingo
- Donquixote Rosinante
- Donquixote Homing (ドンキホーテ・ホーミング, Donkihōte Hōmingu): The father of Donquixote Doflamingo and Donquixote Rosinante. He renounced his privileges as a Celestial Dragon to live as a normal human.
- St. Donquixote Mjosgard (ドンキホーテ・ミョスガルド聖, Donkihōte Myosugarudo Sei): A World Noble who in the past attempt to recapture his freed fish-man slaves at the Fish-Man Island, where he met Queen Otohime and became her ally and a supporter of her efforts to integrate fish-men and merfolk with humans.^{[ch. 625,626,908]} During the Reverie, he directly opposed other World Nobles from threatening Otohime's family, beating Charlos on the spot,^{[ch. 907,908]} whereupon he was executed by Figarland Garling.^{[ch. 1086]}

=== Roswald Family ===
- St. Roswald Roswald (ロズワード・ロズワード聖, Rozuwādo Rozuwādo Sei; St. Rosward): The father of Charlos and Shalria. Roswald is voiced by Hirohiko Kakegawa in the original Japanese version and by John Tillman in the Funimation dub.
- St. Roswald Charlos (ロズワード・チャルロス聖, Rozuwādo Charurosu Sei): Roswald's son and Shalria's older brother who is spoiled and bratty. Charlos is voiced by Chafurin in the original Japanese version and by Jason Kane in the Funimation dub.
- St. Roswald Shalria (ロズワード・シャルリア宮, Rozuwādo Sharuria Gū): Roswald's daughter and Charlos's younger sister. Shalria is voiced by Rumi Kasahara in the original Japanese version and by Tiffany Grant in the Funimation dub.

== Commander-in-Chief ==
Kong (コング, Kongu) is the commander-in-chief of the World Government, with authority over the Marines, Cipher Pol, other Government subsidiaries and facilities. 27 years ago, he was the Fleet Admiral of the Marines and Sengoku's predecessor before being promoted. Kong is voiced by Unshō Ishizuka in the original Japanese version and by Jim Foronda in the Funimation dub.

== Marines ==
Flag of the Marines.

Selected key officers of the Marines
Name	Rank	Devil Fruit	Notes	Anime voice actor(s)		Live actor(s)
Name	Rank	Devil Fruit	Notes	JP	US	Live actor(s)
Sakazuki (Akainu)	Fleet Admiral	Mag-Mag	Won duel with Aokiji for Fleet Admiral	Michio Nakao Fumihiko Tachiki	Andrew Love	TBD
Sengoku	Fleet Admiral (ret.)	Human-Human (Buddha)	Retired after Marineford	Takkō Ishimori Tōru Ōkawa	Ed Blaylock Philip Weber	TBD
Borsalino (Kizaru)	Admiral	Glint-Glint	Modeled on Kunie Tanaka	Unshō Ishizuka Ryōtarō Okiayu	Ray Hurd	TBD
Kuzan (Aokiji)	Admiral (fmr.)	Chilly-Chilly	Resigned after duel with Akainu and joined Blackbeard Pirates	Takehito Koyasu	Bob Carter Jason Douglas	TBD
Issho (Fujitora)	Admiral	Press-Press	Promoted after Marineford	Ikuya Sawaki	Charles C. Campbell	TBD
Aramaki (Ryokugyū)	Admiral	Forest-Forest	Promoted after Marineford	Keiji Fujiwara Jun'ichi Suwabe	Matthew David Rudd	TBD
Monkey D. Garp	Vice Admiral	—N/a	Luffy's grandfather	Hiroshi Naka	Brian Mathis	Vincent Regan
Smoker	Vice Admiral	Smoke-Smoke	Promoted to Commodore after Alabasta, Vice Admiral after Marineford	Ginzō Matsuo Mahito Ōba	Russell Velazquez Greg Dulcie	Callum Kerr
Hina	Rear Admiral	Bind-Bind	Friends with Smoker, promoted from Captain	Tomoko Naka	Kathleen Delaney Jennifer Seman Rachel Messer	TBD
Tashigi	Captain	—N/a	Resembles Zoro's friend Kuina, promoted after Alabasta	Junko Noda	Priscilla Everett Monica Rial	Julia Rehwald
Koby	Captain	—N/a	Former cabin boy for Alvida; friend of Luffy	Mika Doi	Kayzie Rogers Leah Clark Micah Solusod	Morgan Davies

The Marines (Note: The Japanese word kaigun (海軍) translates as navy in English and as marine in French and Dutch, and as Marine in German.) (海軍, Kaigun; Marines), translated as the "Navy" in the English translations of the manga and the 4Kids English dub of the anime, (Note: The normal Japanese word for "marine", kaiheitai (海兵隊), is not used in the original.) are a maritime force under the command of the World Government. Currently the position of fleet admiral, who is the leader of the organization, is occupied by Akainu. The greatest forces are the three admirals, who are currently Kizaru, Fujitora, and Ryokugyu. The corrupted Captain Ax-Hand Morgan (father of Helmeppo) was the first high-ranking officer of the Marines depicted in the series until he was stripped of his status when he was defeated by Luffy.

=== Fleet Admiral ===
The Fleet Admiral is the highest rank in the Marines. Aside from Kong, the following are known fleet admirals:

==== Sakazuki ====
Sakazuki (サカズキ), better known as Admiral Akainu (赤犬; lit. "Red Dog"), is a ruthless Marine officer with the ability of the Logia-type Mag-Mag Fruit (マグマグの実, Magu Magu no Mi), which allows him to control, create, and transform into magma.^{[ch. 397, 573, 610]} Akainu is a firm believer in "Absolute Justice," going as far as eliminating an entire population should an enemy be hidden there.^{[ch. 397]} After Sengoku retires, Akainu wins the position of fleet admiral in a duel against Aokiji after ten days of fighting in Punk Hazard.^{[ch. 650]} His appearance is modeled after Bunta Sugawara.^{[ch. 558]}

He is voiced at first by Michio Nakao in the earlier parts of the original Japanese version and later by Fumihiko Tachiki in the later parts of the original Japanese version. In the Funimation English adaptation, his voice is supplied by Andrew Love.

==== Sengoku ====
"Sengoku the Buddha" (仏のセンゴク, Hotoke no Sengoku) is a Marine officer and contemporary of Gold Roger who eventually rises to the rank of fleet admiral.^{[ch. 234, 434]} (Note: Named after the Sengoku period of Japanese history.) The ability of the Mystical Zoan-type Human-Human Fruit: Model Buddha (ヒトヒトの実 モデル：大仏, Hito Hito no Mi, Moderu: Daibutsu) allows Sengoku to transform into a daibutsu.^{[ch. 585]} Sengoku is capable of utilizing all three types of Haki. Following the Paramount War, he retires from the service and, against his recommendation to promote Aokiji, is succeeded by Akainu.^{[ch. 650]} Although retired from active duty, Sengoku continues to serve in the Marines as an inspector general. Two years after the war, he is shown to have mellowed due to his lack of responsibilities.

In the Japanese anime television series, he is initially voiced by Takkō Ishimori, later by Tōru Ōkawa. In the Funimation English adaptation, he is initially voiced by Ed Blaylock and later by Philip Weber.

=== Admirals ===
The Admirals are the second highest rank in the Marines. At the beginning of the series, the group of the three Admirals consisted of Sakazuki (Akainu), Borsalino (Kizaru) and Kuzan (Aokiji). After the two-year timeskip, following Sakazuki's promotion and Kuzan's resignation, the group consists of Borsalino, Issho (Fujitora) and Aramaki (Ryokugyū) also known as Greenbull.

==== Borsalino ====
Borsalino (ボルサリーノ, Borusarīno), better known as Admiral Kizaru (黄猿; lit. "Yellow Monkey"), is an easygoing marine officer with the power of the Logia-type Glint-Glint Fruit (ピカピカの実, Pika Pika no Mi), which allows him to generate, control, or become light as well as fire destructive beams.^{[ch. 507, 511]} Despite his unusually calm and laidback demeanor often leading to absent-mindedness (asking pirates for Sentomaru's direction), he is a highly competent and unforgiving fighter.^{[ch. 507]} He is depicted as being conflicted in his missions, befriending Vegapunk whom he had been ordered to arrest for 26 years; his killing of Vegapunk would traumatize him to the point he uncharacteristically lashed out at Sakazuki and caused him to sincerely apologize.^{[ch. 1124]}

The character's appearance is modeled after Kunie Tanaka.^{[ch. 558]} Originally voiced by Unshō Ishizuka until 2018, he was replaced by Ryōtarō Okiayu following Ishizuka's death. In the Funimation English adaptation, Borsalino is voiced by Ray Hurd.

==== Issho ====
Issho (イッショウ, Isshō), better known as Admiral Fujitora (藤虎; lit. "Purple Tiger"), is one of the Marine admirals who joined during the timeskip. He has the ability to control gravity through the powers of the Press-Press Fruit, being able to make the environment heavier or lighter. Having blinded himself due to the trauma of numerous atrocities prior to his career in the Marines, he uses Color of Observation Haki to feel what is around him.^{[ch. 799]}

He wanted to end the Seven Warlords of the Sea system, which is why in Dressrosa he had a conflict against Donquixote Doflamingo and Trafalgar Law, where he later had to team up with the latter and the Straw Hat Crew to stop Doflamingo's corruption. Despite orders to arrest him, a fight with Luffy made him gain immense respect for the pirate, willfully permitting the Straw Hats' escape to Sengoku's chagrin.^{[ch. 799]}

His character appearance is modeled after Shintaro Katsu. In the original Japanese version of the anime, he is voiced by Ikuya Sawaki. In the Funimation English adaptation, his voice is supplied by Charles C. Campbell.

==== Aramaki ====
Aramaki (アラマキ), better known as Admiral Ryokugyū (緑牛; lit. "Green Bull"), is the second of the two admirals appointed to their rank during the two-year timeskip, next to Fujitora. He ate the Forest-Forest Fruit, a Devil Fruit power that allows him to generate, control, and transform into plants.^{[ch. 1054]} Ryokugyu can summon roots to impale people and objects and then drain them of their moisture and nutrients,^{[ch. 1053]} which allowed him to go three years without eating.^{[ch. 905]} While easygoing much like former Admiral Aokiji, Ryokugyu appears to be a supporter of Akainu's brand of Absolute Justice, but he is more prone to destroying those who do not side with his brand of "justice", especially when it comes to the World Government authority.^{[ch. 1054]} So, thus the is venturing to Wano to try to bring down Luffy to get his superior's approval.^{[ch. 1053]} Ryokugyu's appearance seems modeled after Japanese actor Yoshio Harada.

Ryokugyu is voiced by Jun'ichi Suwabe (Note: Originally voiced by Keiji Fujiwara in a silhouetted debut, Ryokugyu is voiced in all subsequent appearances by Suwabe.) in the Japanese version of the anime. In the Funimation English adaptation, his voice is supplied by Matthew David Rudd.

=== Vice-Admirals ===
The Vice-Admirals are the fourth highest rank in the Marines under the commander in chief Kong, the fleet admiral and the three admirals.

==== Monkey D. Garp ====
Monkey D. Garp (モンキー・D・ガープ, Monkī Dī Gāpu), nicknamed Garp the "Fist" (ゲンコツのガープ, Genkotsu no Gāpu) and "Hero of the Marines" (海軍の英雄, Kaigun no Eiyū), is a vice-admiral, Monkey D. Dragon's father, and Luffy's grandfather.^{[ch. 432]} He is famous for cornering Gold Roger^{[ch. 431]} and considered a hero of the Marines.^{[ch. 432]} After Roger's execution, he took care of Roger's son Ace and raised him like his own grandson.^{[ch. 551]} He has superhuman strength, enough to lift and throw cannonballs like baseball pitches.^{[ch. 438]} Garp takes both Koby and Helmeppo under his wing.

At the end of the war with Whitebeard, Garp retires from the front line and decides to train the next generation of Marines. He is imprisoned on Fullalead by Blackbeard after saving Koby on the island.

Garp is capable of utilizing all three types of Haki and can use the advanced application for both Haoshoku and Busoshoku Haki.^{[ch. 1080]}

He is voiced by Hiroshi Naka in the Japanese version of the anime. In the English version of the series, he is voiced by Brian Mathis in the Funimation dub.

In the live-action series, Garp is portrayed by Vincent Regan.

==== Smoker ====
"White Chase" Smoker (白猟のスモーカー, Hakuryō no Sumōkā) is a marine officer and cigar enthusiast, keeping plenty of cigars strapped to the left side of his jacket while smoking two lit ones.^{[ch. 98]} Smoker ate the Logia-type Smoke-Smoke Fruit (モクモクの実, Moku Moku no Mi) allows him to manipulate, create, and transform into smoke.^{[ch. 100]} His weapon is a jutte tipped with sea-prism stone. Upon seeing Luffy smile before miraculously surviving his execution in Loguetown, Smoker came to believe that he is a potential threat, since his attitude during his near demise, mirrored that of Gold Roger when he was executed, Smoker became more confused when Dragon stopped him from killing Luffy. Befuddled by these events, Smoker followed Luffy to the Grand Line and became obsessed with capturing him, to a near stalker like level, which only intensifies upon discovering Luffy is Dragon's son during the Paramount War. Smoker is a mentor of Tashigi since the Straw Hats arrived at Loguetown.

Two years after the Paramount War, he is promoted to the rank of vice-admiral.^{[ch. 169]} Smoker unwillingly allied with the Straw Hats and the Heart Pirates on Punk Hazard due to Trafalgar Law's interference, assisting in the defeat of Caesar Clown.^{[ch. 655]}

In the Japanese anime series, he is voiced originally by Ginzō Matsuo, later by Mahito Ōba. In the 4Kids English adaptation, referred to as "Chaser the Smoke Hunter", he is voiced by Rusell Velazquez. In the Funimation English adaptation, where he is called Smoker the "White Hunter", his voice is supplied by Greg Dulcie. In the live-action series, Smoker is portrayed by Callum Kerr.

==== Tsuru ====
Tsuru (つる) is an elderly vice-admiral^{[ch. 234]} and the grandmother of rear admiral Kujaku.^{[ch. 1080]} She possesses the powers of the Wash-Wash Fruit, which allows her to wash anything as if they are clothes and hang them out to dry.^{[ch. 556]}

Tsuru is voiced by Minori Matsushima in episodes 151-755 of the original Japanese version. In the Funimation dub, she is voiced by Juli Erickson in episode 459, Pam Dougherty in "Adventures in Nebulandia", and Wendy Powell in episode 705-present.

==== Other Vice-Admirals ====
- John Giant (ジョン・ジャイアント, Jon Jaianto): A vice-admiral who is the first giant from Elbaph to enlist in the Marines. He was in charge of ordering Luffy's capture when he got his first bounty.^{[ch. 96]} John Giant is shown to be brave enough to go up against Whitebeard in the Summit War of Marineford. In the original Japanese version, John Giant is voiced by Masaharu Satō in the earlier episodes, Eiji Takemoto in episode 294, and Hisao Egawa from episode 473-present. In the 4Kids dub, he is voiced by Marc Thompson. In the Funimation dub, John Giant is voiced by J. Paul Slavens in the earlier episodes and by Tyson Rinehart from episode 473-present.
- The Giant Squad (巨人部隊, Kyojin Butai) is a group of eight giants who work for the Marines. They were charged with the duties of guarding the execution platforms. Some of the Giant Squad members fought Little Oars Jr. during the infamous battle at Marineport. Its known members are:
  - Lacroix (ラクロワ, Rakurowa): A vice-admiral in the Giant Squad. He is voiced by Takahiro Yoshimizu in the original Japanese version and by Brandon Luna in the Funimation dub.
  - Lonz (ロンズ, Ronzu): A vice-admiral in the Giant Squad who wears a medieval helmet. He is voiced by Masaya Takatsuka in the original Japanese version and by Ben Phillips in the FUnimation dub.
- Stainless (ステンレス, Sutenresu): A vice-admiral who partook in the Summit War of Marineford. Stainless is voiced by Yuji Ueda in episode 151 of the original Japanese version and by Eiji Takemoto in the later episodes of the original Japanese version. In the Funimation dub, he is voiced by Chuck Huber.
- Momonga (モモンガ): A vice-admiral who takes part in the Buster Call on Enies Lobby, escorts Boa Hancock to Impel Down, fights in the Summit War, and is later promoted Base Commander of Marine Base G-1. Momonga is voiced by Shinichiro Ohta in the original Japanese version, Francis Henry in the English Funimation dub, and Kent Williams in One Piece Film: Red.
- Cancer (キャンサー, Kyansā): A vice-admiral in sunglasses who is always seen with a cigar in his mouth. Cancer is voiced by Ivan Jasso in the Funimation dub.
- Dalmatian (ダルメシアン, Darumeshian): A vice-admiral who partook in the Summit War of Marineford. He ate an unknown Zoan Devil Fruit that enables him to transform into a dalmatian. Dalmatian is voiced by Kōji Haramaki in the original Japanese version and by Philip Webber in the Funimation dub.
- Hound (ハウンド, Haundo): A bespectacled vice-admiral who accompanied Kizaru and the Marines in attacking Egghead. He ate the Dog-Dog Fruit: Model Hound that enables him to transform into a hound. Hound is voiced by Shinichi Yamata in the original Japanese version and by Trey Upton in the Funimation dub.
- Guillotine (ギロチン, Girochin): A long-bearded vice-admiral who accompanied Kizaru and the Marines in attacking Egghead. Guillotine is voiced by Shunsuke Kanie in the original Japanese version and by Gerardo Davila in the original Funimation dub.
- Red King (レッドキング, Reddokingu): A large bald-headed vice-admiral with a long neck and six chins who accompanied Kizaru and the Marines in attacking Egghead. He wielded a special gauntlet that enables him to pull off the Steam Knuckle attack. Red King is voiced by Volcano Ōta in the original Japanese version and by Nick Huber in the Funimation dub.
- Tosa (土茶): A big burly vice-admiral who accompanied Kizaru and the Marines in attacking Egghead. Tosa is voiced by Toshiya Chiba in the original Japanese version and by William Ofoegbu in the Funimation dub.
- Pomsky (ポンスキー, Ponsukī): A burly vice-admiral who wields a seashell-shaped war hammer. He ate the Ott-Ott Fruit, which allows him to transform into a sea otter. Pomsky is voiced by Tōru Nakane in the original Japanese version, while Arisa Sekine voices his younger self. In the Funimation dub, he is voiced by Weston Loy.
- Bluegrass (ブルーグラス, Burūgurasu): A short and elderly vice-admiral who accompanied Kizaru and the Marines in attacking Egghead. She ate the Ride-Ride Fruit, which enables her to overtake and control anything she rides on. Bluegrass is voiced by Hiroko Emori in the original Japanese version and by Casey Casper in the Funimation dub.
- Urban (ウルバン, Uruban): A tall vice-admiral with a monstrous face and foot-length hair who accompanied Kizaru and the Marines in attacking Egghead. He ate the Barrel-Barrel Fruit, which enables him to transform parts of his body into cannons. Urban is voiced by Yūsuke Numata in the original Japanese version and by Caleb Mosley in the Funimation dub.
- Vergo was a vice-admiral who actually worked as an undercover member of the Donquixote Pirates.

=== Rear Admirals ===
The Rear Admirals are the fourth highest rank in the Marines. The following characters are rear admirals:

==== Hina ====
Hina (ヒナ) is an rear admiral in the Marines and a long-time friend of Smoker's since they were rookies in the academy. She was introduced as a Marine captain on her debut, being promoted to rear admiral after the timeskip. She is also the superior of Django and Fullbody, who admire her with passion. Hina has the power of the Bind-Bind Fruit (Cage-Cage Fruit in the anime dub) that allows her to form restraints on people by swiping her limbs through them or form a cage when she extends her arms.

She is voiced by Tomoko Naka in the Japanese version. In the 4Kids English version, she is voiced by Kathleen Delaney. In the Funimation English adaptation, her voice is supplied by Jennifer Seman and understudied by Rachel Messer in One Piece: Stampede.

==== X. Drake ====
"Red Flag" (赤旗, Akahata) X. Drake (X(ディエス)・ドレーク, Diesu Dorēku; pronounced as "Diez Drake") is the captain of the Drake Pirates. He has the power of the Dragon-Dragon Fruit, Model: Allosaurus (リュウリュウの実 モデル アロサウルス, Ryū Ryū no Mi Moderu Arosaurusu), a Zoan-type Devil Fruit that gives him the ability to transform into an Allosaurus.^{[ch. 929]} He is a former Marine rear admiral who became a pirate, with his infamy as pirate leading him to be known as part of the Worst Generation,^{[ch. 664]} but secretly continued to work for the Marines as captain of the "SWORD" division.^{[ch. 956]} Under this identity, Drake managed to join the Animal Kingdom Pirates as Kaido's subordinate, becoming one of their Shinuchi as part of the Tobi Roppo.^{[ch. 929]} Drake is ousted once his treachery is uncovered and he joins Luffy's alliance to take down Kaido.^{[ch. 990]}

X. Drake is voiced by Eiji Takemoto in the original Japanese version and by D. C. Douglas in the Funimation dub.

The character is named after privateer Francis Drake.

==== Kujaku ====
Kujaku (孔雀) is an rear admiral in the Marines and the granddaughter of vice-admiral Tsuru. Kujaku has the powers of the Whip-Whip Fruit which allows her to command anything she whips.^{[ch. 1080]} She is voiced by Marina Inoue in the Japanese version, and by Mallorie Rodak in the Funimation dub.

==== Prince Grus ====
Prince Grus (プリンス・グルス, Purinsu Gurusu) is a rear admiral and member of SWORD. He ate the Glorp-Glorp Fruit, which enables him to create and control clay enough that he can create clay golems. Prince Grus is voiced by Satoshi Hino in the original Japanese version and by Ryan Negrón in the Funimation dub.

=== Marine Captains ===
The Captains are the fifth highest rank in the Marines. The following characters are captains in the Marines:

==== Tashigi ====
Tashigi (たしぎ) is a Marine officer serving as Smoker's second-in-command.^{[ch. 137, 179]} While adept at sword fighting, she is unusually clumsy.^{[ch. 96]} She is well-versed in the famous katana, knowing their names and origins. Her stated goal is to remove all meitō, named swords with prestigious histories, from the hands of those who would use them for their own ends.^{[ch. 97]} By coincidence, she bears a striking resemblance to Kuina, Zoro's deceased childhood friend, something he is uncomfortable with.^{[ch. 100]} She assists in the recovery of the "giganticized" children after assisting in the defeat of Caesar Clown at Punk Hazard.^{[ch. 655]}

Her voice actress is Junko Noda. In the 4Kids and Funimation English adaptations, she is voiced by Priscilla Everett and Monica Rial, respectively. In the live-action series, Tashigi is portrayed by Julia Rehwald.

==== Koby ====
Koby (コビー, Kobī) is the first friend Luffy makes on his journey, finding him forced to work as a chore boy on Alvida's ship. Inspired by Luffy, and with his help, Koby escapes and joins the Marines, where he and Helmeppo pique the interest of Vice Admiral Garp, who takes them under his wing.^{[ch. 2–7, 112]} Eventually, Koby masters the Six Powers skill Shave and begins using Color of Observation Haki. After two years, he became a captain in the Marines.^{[ch. 432, 594]} Koby is regarded as a hero from his instrumental role in the unseen Rocky Port Incident during the timeskip, where he unwillingly worked with Trafalgar Law and Blackbeard to take down Wang Zhi at Fullalead, saving citizens while allowing Blackbeard to take over the island.^{[ch. 1059]} Koby would be kidnapped onto Fullalead after an incident involving Blackbeard and Boa Hancock, only to be saved by Garp.

In the original Japanese series, his voice is supplied by Mika Doi. In the 4Kids English adaptation, he is voiced by Kayzie Rogers. In the Funimation English adaptation, his name is spelled Koby, and his voice is supplied by Leah Clark and Micah Solusod as a teenager. In the live-action series, Koby is portrayed by Morgan Davies.

==== Morgan ====
"Axe-Hand" Morgan (モーガン, Mōgan) was a corrupt Marine captain who has an axe for a right hand. Established at the 153rd Branch in Shells Town, he abused his power and held Zoro prisoner until Luffy freed him.^{[ch. 4]} Both of them managed to defeat Morgan.^{[ch. 6]} The Marines stripped him of his rank and arrested him for his abuse of power.^{[ch. 88]}

After Morgan escaped from the Marines trying to take Helmeppo hostage,^{[ch. 96]} he was left at sea by him and has since been adrift.^{[ch. 105]}

He is voiced by Banjō Ginga. In the English adaptions of the series, he is voiced by David Brimmer in the 4Kids dub and by Brett Weaver in the FUNimation dub. In the live-action series, Morgan is portrayed by Langley Kirkwood.

The character is named after the real life pirate Henry Morgan.

==== Nezumi ====
Nezumi (ネズミ; lit. "Rat") is a corrupt Marine captain of the 16th Branch in the East Blue who accepted bribes from Arlong to cover up his actions. His name refers to his whiskers and hood with rodent ears, resembling a rat.^{[ch. 69]} After Arlong was defeated by Luffy while ending his business, Nezumi was evacuated by his men and took revenge by demanding Luffy's first bounty as a pirate.^{[ch. 94]}

Nezumi is voiced by Junko Noda in the original Japanese version. In the 4Kids English adaptarion he is voiced by Dan Green. In the Funimation adaptation, Nezumi was initially voiced by Vic Mignogna and later by Derick Snow starting in 2019. In the live-action series, Nezumi is portrayed by Rory Acton-Burnell.

=== Commanders ===
The following characters are or were commanders.

==== Donquixote Rosinante ====
Donquixote Rosinante (ドンキホーテ・ロシナンテ, Donkihōte Roshinante) was the younger brother of Donquixote Doflamingo, a top officer of the Donquixote Pirates occupying the Hearts Seat under the code name "Corazon" (コラソン, Korason), and an undercover agent from the Marines with the rank of commander who reports directly to the then Admiral Sengoku. He ate the Calm-Calm Fruit (ナギナギの実, Nagi Nagi no Mi) which grants him the ability to create a wall cancelling all sounds. He also makes use of this ability to make his elder brother believe that he has lost the power of speech after an unknown accident. Donquixote Rosinate is the second person to occupy the Hearts Seat, his predecessor being Vergo. Donquixote Rosinante is clumsy and is most often seen lighting his feather cloak up while trying to light a cigarette. He was killed years ago by Doflamingo.

In the Japanese anime television series, he is voiced by Koichi Yamadera. In the Funimation English adaptation, his voice is supplied by Ray Chase.

==== Hibari ====
Hibari (ひばり) is a commander and member of SWORD who is an expert sniper. Hibari is voiced by Shiori Mikami in the original Japanese version and by Celeste Perez in the Funimation dub.

=== Lieutenant Commanders ===
The following characters are lieutenant commanders.

==== Helmeppo ====
Helmeppo (ヘルメッポ, Herumeppo) is the son of the corrupt Marine Captain Morgan. He is introduced as a coward, hiding behind his father's wealth and power. Losing his luxurious life after his father's arrest, he reluctantly joins the Marines, where he and Koby become protégés of Garp and he becomes a lieutenant commander.

He is voiced by Koichi Nagano in the Japanese version. In the English adaptions of the series, he is voiced by Sean Schemmel in the 4Kids dub. In the Funimation dub, he is voiced by Troy Baker in EPs 2-3 and EP280, before the role was recast to Mike McFarland. In the live-action series, Helmeppo is portrayed by Aidan Scott.

==== Django ====
Django (ジャンゴ, Jango) is a hypnotist with a habit of moonwalking.^{[ch. 25]} Introduced as the captain of the Black Cat Pirates,^{[ch. 26]} in the past being their first mate before Captain Kuro's resignation, he eventually befriends the Marine officer Fullbody sometime after Kuro's defeat,^{[ch. 148]} and joins him in the service as a seaman recruit under the command of Hina,^{[ch. 172]} whom they both admire.^{[ch. 214]} He would later become a lieutenant commander in the Marines. Django's weapons of choice are chakrams which he uses for throwing, slashing and hypnotizing his enemies.^{[ch. 25,32,215]}

In the Japanese version, he was originally played by Kazuki Yao, and played by Wataru Takagi in the short film Jango's Dance Carnival and in the 2024 reappearance. In the 4Kids English version, he is voiced by Oliver Wyman. In the Funimation English adaptation, his name is spelled "Jango" and his voice is supplied by Kenny Green.

==== Fullbody ====
Fullbody (フルボディ, Furubodi) was introduced as a smug Marine lieutenant on his visit to the Baratie, where he was ridiculed by Sanji. After helping the pirate Django, he was demoted to a seaman recruit, with Django joining him as subordinates of Hina, whom they both admire.

He is voiced by Hideo Ishikawa in the Japanese version, by Tom Wayland in the 4Kids English dub, and by John Burgmeier in the Funimation dub. In the live-action series, he is portrayed by Jean Henry.

=== SWORD ===
SWORD is a Marines group who have resigned themselves from the command structure while still working for the Marines as Kuzan claims that they "are Marines, but also not".^{[ch. 1080]} Members of SWORD include Rear Admirals Kujaku, Prince Grus, and X. Drake (who serves as Captain of SWORD), Captain Koby, Commander Hibari, and Lt. Commander Helmeppo.

=== Other Marine members ===
- Dr. Fishbonen (Dr. フィッシュボーネン, Dokutā Fisshubōnen): A naval surgeon (軍医, Gun'i) stationed at Marineford. He tended to the wounded after the war at Marineford, revealing to Koby that he had awakened his Haki.^{[ch. 594]} He is voiced by Koji Haramaki in the original Japanese version of the anime, and by Steve Yurko in the Funimation dub.
- Sentomaru was the captain of the Marines' Science Unit.
- Dr. Vegapunk was the Head Scientist of the Marines until his revocation was ordered.
- Caesar Clown formerly worked as a scientist for the Marines.
- Attach was the chief of the Marines' Photography Department, until he was dismissed.

=== Anime-exclusive Marines ===
There are several Marines who are exclusive of Toei Animation's anime series:

==== Daddy Masterson ====
Daddy Masterson is a retired Marine who now works as a bounty hunter in Loguetown.

==== Nelson Royale ====
Nelson Royale (ネルソン・ロイヤル, Neruson Roiyaru) is a Marine officer with the rank of Teitoku (提督; an anime-exclusive rank) and commander of the 8th Branch. He is very large, so he is often shown sitting down. Nelson sought the dragon Ryu, intending immortality by his bones.

Nelson Royale is voiced by Junpei Takiguchi in the original Japanese version, and by Ray Gestaut in the Funimation dub.

==== Rapanui Pasqua ====
Rapanui Pasqua (ラパヌイ・パスクア, Rapanui Pasukua) is a lieutenant commander with a strong finger-flipping talent. In his early life, he and his friends were part of the Pumpkin Pirates on Ruluka until they and Wetton's minion Ian got stuck in the Rainbow Mist where they stayed young. When the Rainbow Mist collapsed, Rapanui and his friends were returned to their own time. By the time they returned to Ruluka, Rapanui and his friends were part of the Marines.

Rapanui Pasqua is voiced by Yukiko Hirotsu as a child in the original Japanese version and by Keiichi Sonobe as an adult in the original Japanese version. In the Funimation dub, he is voiced by Chris Patton.

==== G-8 ====
G-8, officially Marine "Grand Line" Eighth Branch (海軍G・L第8支部, Kaigun Gurando Rain Dai-Hatchi Shibu), is a Marine Base occupying Navarone Island, serving as the main setting of the anime-exclusive G-8 Arc.

- Jonathan (ジョナサン, Jonasan): A Marine Vice Admiral, and base commander of the G-8. He is also Jessica's husband. When the Straw Hat Pirates are trapped on Navarone, he thinks strategically about how to prevent them from escaping. In the anime he is also seen arriving at Marineford for the execution of Portgas D. Ace. Jonathan is voiced by Nobuo Tanaka in the original Japanese version, and by Mark Stoddard in the Funimation dub.
- Drake (ドレイク, Doreiku): A Marine Lieutenant Commander. He debuted in the movie Dead End Adventure, where he tried to chase the Straw Hat Pirates, later appearing in the same situation in the following film, The Cursed Holy Sword. He later appeared in the anime as part of the G-8 personnel, acting as Jonathan's right-hand man. He is also seen arriving at Marineford for the execution of Portgas D. Ace. Drake is voiced by Eiji Takemoto in the original Japanese version, and by Bryan Massey in the Funimation dub.
- Jessica (ジェシカ, Jeshika): The Head Chef of the G-8, and Jonathan's wife. When Sanji cooks in her kitchen while pretending to be a new employee, she and the rest of the cooks are impressed by his skill. Jessica is voiced by Kazue Ikura in the original Japanese version, and by Jennifer Seman in the Funimation dub.
- Kobato (コバト): A pediatrician at G-8, serving as the Acting Medical Room Chief, and the daughter of Mekao. Although she works in medicine, she has hemophobia, fainting at the mere thought of blood. Kobato is voiced by Akiko Hiramatsu in the original Japanese version, and by Jamie Marchi in the Funimation dub.
- Mekao (メカオ): A mechanic at G-8, and Kobato's father. He ends up helping the Straw Hat Pirates escape from the base. Kobato is voiced by Keiichi Sonobe in the original Japanese version, and by Jerry Russell in the Funimation dub.

==== Shepherd ====
Shepherd (シェパード, Shepādo) is a Marine Headquarters commander sent to inspect G-8. Shortly after arriving, he is attacked by Nico Robin, who assumes his identity after stealing his uniform and hiding him. When he is later discovered, the Marines at the base mistake him for a member of the Straw Hat Pirates. Therefore, they lock him up, and Usopp, knowing that Robin has taken his identity, takes advantage of the situation to say that he is a crew member named "Condoriano" (コンドリアーノ, Kondoriāno) and that he lost his memory. Later, when he manages to make the G-8 Marines see that they made a mistake with him, he tries to prevent the Straw Hat Pirates from escaping from the base.

The character gained popularity among the public due to his alias as "Condoriano" and his comical moments during the G-8 Arc, becoming an internet meme.

Shepherd is voiced by Keiichi Nanba in the original Japanese version, and by Duncan Brannan in the Funimation dub.

== Cipher Pol ==
Cipher Pol (サイファーポール, Saifā Pōru) is a series of intelligence agencies who do investigations, espionage, and assassinations for the World Government.

Cipher Pols Number 1 through 8 are public institutions known throughout the seas and include:

- Jerry (ジェリー, Jerī): An agent from the CP6. Jerry is voiced by Naomi Kusumi in the original Japanese version and by Wilbur Penn in the Funimation dub.
- Wanze (ワンゼ): An agent from the CP7 and an expert cook. Wanze is voiced by Yasuhiro Takato in the original Japanese version and by Jessie James Grelle in the Funimation dub.
- Alpha (アルファ, Arufa): An agent from the CP8 and Kalifa's sister. Alpha is voiced by Eri Miyajima in the original Japanese version and by Jaclyn Thomas in the Funimation dub.

=== CP9 ===
Cipher Pol Number 9 (サイファーポールナンバーナイン, Saifā Pōru Nanbā Nain), abbreviated as CP9 (シーピーナイン, Shī Pī Nain), is the secret, ninth unit of the World Government's intelligence agency Cipher Pol based at Enies Lobby (エニエスロビー, Eniesu Robī), one of the World Government's three strongholds.^{[ch. 346]} Specializing in assassination,^{[ch. 382]} they utilize a weapon-themed martial art called the Six Powers (六式, Rokushiki).^{[ch. 347]}

Initially led by Spandam in their debut, some agents of CP9 worked undercover on Water 7 for several years, Rob Lucci and Kaku working as shipwrights at the Galley-La Company, Kalifa as Iceberg's secretary, and Blueno as a bartender. Other members at that time include Jabra, Kumadori and Fukuro. Despite their failure at Enies Lobby to get Nico Robin to the Gates of Justice, Spandam is hospitalized and the top agents of CP9 defeated by the Straw Hats and branded as fugitives by the World Government, they are eventually promoted to into CP0.

- Spandine (スパンダイン, Supandain): The influential chief of CP9 22 years ago. In the present, Spandine had stepped down from his position due to an illness which left him bedridden with his influence decreasing. Spandine is voiced by Masaya Onosaka in the original Japanese version and by Christopher Corey Smith in the Funimation dub.
- Nero (ネロ): A man with weasel whiskers, was the newest recruit in CP9 who had not fully mastered all the Rokushiki skills and was apparently killed by Lucci for his failure.^{[ch. 257]} Nero is voiced by Hidenobu Kiuchi in the original Japanese version and by Todd Haberkorn in the Funimation dub.

=== CP-0 ===
Cipher Pol Aigis 0 (サイファーポールイージスゼロ, Saifā Pōru Ījisu Zero), abbreviated as CP-0 (シーピーゼロ, Shī Pī Zero), is the World Government's more secretive, elite enforcement unit and the strongest agency in Cipher Pol. Unlike other Cipher Pol agencies under the control of the World Government, CP-0 operates directly under the command of the Celestial Dragons. While not much is known about its individual agents and their abilities, they have demonstrated to be masters of Six Powers, much like agents from CP9, and also experts in Haki. Agents who wear masks are among the best combatants of the agency and are stated to be in a league of their own.^{[ch. 1031]}

It is said that when CP-0 is active, world-shaking events are about to occur.^{[ch. 1068]}

Their agents include:

- Blueno (ブルーノ, Burūno): An ex-CP9 agent who travels great distances with manifested "air doors" thanks to the powers of the Door-Door Fruit.^{[ch. 374]} When he first appeared, he posed as a bartender. He is currently an agent of the CP-0. Blueno is voiced by Seiji Sasaki in the original Japanese version and by Kumiko Watanabe in One Piece: Red. In the Funimation dub, he is voiced by Mark Fickert in the TV series and by Bob Carter in the video game One Piece: Unlimited Adventure.
- Kalifa (カリファ, Karifa): An ex-CP9 agent whose "strength-cleaning" bubbles that turn a person into a slippery mannequin thanks to the powers of the Bubble-Bubble Fruit. When she first appeared, she posed as a secretary at the Galley-La Company. She is currently an agent of the CP-0. Kalifa is voiced by Naomi Shindō in the original Japanese version and by Shelley Calene-Black in the Funimation dub.
- Jabra (ジャブラ, Jabura):^{[ch. 413f.]} An ex-CP9 agent and martial artist who ate the Dog-Dog Fruit: Model Wolf, which allows him to transform into a wolf. He is currently an agent of the CP-0. Jabra is voiced by Masaya Takatsuka in the original Japanese version and by Phil Parsons in the Funimation dub.
- Kumadori (クマドリ): An ex-CP9 agent and a man who resembles a kabuki actor and uses an ability called "Life Return" to control every cell in his body.^{[ch. 406]} He is currently an agent of the CP-0. Kumadori is voiced by Hiroaki Yoshida in the original Japanese version and by Andrew Love in the Funimation dub.
- Fukurō (フクロウ): An ex-CP9 agent and a round-shaped man with a zipper across his mouth which has to be opened for him to speak.^{[ch. 375]}^{[ch. 408]} He is currently an agent of the CP-0. Fukurō is voiced by Kumiko Watanabe in the original Japanese version and by Alexis Tipton in the Funimation dub.
- Guernica (ゲルニカ, Gerunika): A masked agent who traveled to Dressrosa along with Joseph and Joseph.^{[ch. 705]} Later he traveled to Wano, where he was killed by Kaido.^{[ch. 1043]}
- Joseph (ヨセフ, Yosefu): A masked agent who traveled to Dressrosa along with Guernica and Gismonda.^{[ch. 705]}
- Gismonda (ジスモンダ, Jisumonda): A masked agent who traveled to Dressrosa along with Guernica and Gismonda.^{[ch. 705]}
- Maha (マハ): A masked agent who traveled to Wano along with Guernica and Joseph. Maha and Izo fought each other in a duel which killed Izo and presumably killed Maha as well.^{[ch. 1041]}

==== Rob Lucci ====
Rob Lucci (ロブ・ルッチ, Robu Rutchi) is an Cipher Pol agent who is known for ruthlessly and mercilessly enforcing the World Government's "justice" and was the strongest agent in CP9 and the history of the agency, working undercover as a shipwright at the Galley-La Company.^{[ch. 422]} He can transform into a leopard thanks to the powers of the Cat-Cat Fruit: Model Leopard.^{[ch. 327, 349]} As of the Final Saga, he serves as a masked agent of the CP-0. Lucci is voiced by Tomokazu Seki in the original Japanese version and by Jason Liebrecht in the Funimation dub.

- Hattori (ハットリ) is Lucci's pet pigeon, with which he performed as a ventriloquist while working at Galley-La Company.

==== Kaku ====
Kaku (カク)^{[ch. 401]} is an ex-CP9 agent and skilled swordsman who can turn into a giraffe thanks to the powers of the Ox-Ox Fruit: Model Giraffe. When he first appeared, he posed as a shipwright at the Gally-La Company's dock one. Kaku is currently a masked agent of the CP-0. Kaku is voiced by Ryōtarō Okiayu in the original Japanese version and by Alex Organ in the Funimation dub while Jerry Jewell voices him in the English dub of the video game One Piece: Unlimited Adventure.

==== Stussy ====
Stussy (ステューシー, Sutyūshī) is a clone of Buckingham Stussy developed by MADS who is employed as a spy by Dr. Vegapunk.^{[ch. 1072]} She remained loyal to Vegapunk and has been working as a deep undercover agent of the World Government for 27 years, infiltrating CP0 and becoming one of its masked agents.^{[ch. 871]} Stussy also posed and operated as an emperor of the Underworld under the nickname of the "Queen of the Pleasure District" (歓楽街の女王, Kanraku-gai no Joō).^{[ch. 860]} Stussy ate an unidentified Bat-Bat Fruit model that enables her to turn into a bat with blood-sucking abilities.^{[ch. 1072]}

Stussy is voiced by Mami Kingetsu in the original Japanese version and by Anastasia Muñoz in the Funimation dub.

==== Spandam ====
Spandam (スパンダム, Supandamu) is the former chief of both Cipher Pol 9 and Cipher Pol 5, and self-centered, but very clumsy son of Spandine who is a very loyal follower of the World Government and really zealous about its doctrine of "absolute justice". He obsessed over moving up in the World Government, and will do anything to achieve it like even manipulating his superiors to gain approval.^{[ch. 358]}^{[ch. 391]}^{[ch. 392]} He is currently an agent of the CP-0. Though extremely weak compared to his then subordinates, Spandam carries the sword Funkfreed. Spandam is voiced by Masaya Onosaka in the original Japanese version and by Christopher Corey Smith in the Funimation dub while Kent Williams voices him in the English dub of the video game One Piece: Unlimited Adventure.

- Funkfreed (ファンクフリード, Fanku Furīdo): A sword wielded by Spandam which is capable of transforming into an elephant after it "ate" the Elephant-Elephant Fruit.^{[ch. 379]}^{[ch. 400]} Funkfreed's vocal effects are provided by Kōhei Fukuhara in the original Japanese version and by Kenneth Thompson in the Funimation dub.

== Government Islands ==
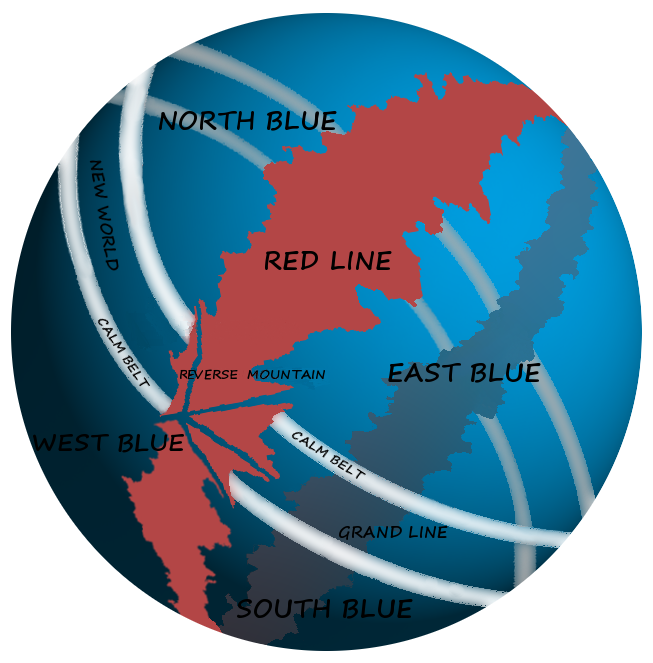
The Blue Planet of One Piece is largely under the control of the World Government. The Celestial Dragons live atop the Red Line.

=== Enies Lobby ===
Enies Lobby (エニエスロビー, Eniesu Robī) is one of the three strongholds of the World Government and the Judicial Island. People there are sentenced to Impel Down, and no one sentenced has ever been declared innocent of a crime.

- Bas (バス, Basu), And (アンド, Ando), and Kerville (カビル, Kabiru): Collectively known as Baskerville (バスカビル, Basukabiru), are the chief justices of Enies Lobby, in service of the World Government.^{[ch. 379]} They act as a large three-headed man, but is actually three separate men who are so close as best friends that they prefer acting as one 16 ft. body.^{[ch. 399]} When in their combined appearance, And stands bow-legged while Bass and Kerville stand on And's thighs as they are covered in a massive blue tabbard. During the Enies Lobby arc, Baskerville is among those who pursued the Straw Hats when they arrived. Their disguise was split by Paulie and Zambai. Baskerville is voiced by Mahito Ōba (Bas), Keiichi Sonobe (And), and Kōji Haramaki (Kerville) in the original Japanese version, and by Jeremy Inman (Bas), Jerry Russell (And), and Ray Gestaut (Kerville) in the Funimation dub.
  - Bas is a stubbled, square-jawed man wearing some type of visor and sporting a large left arm, a large left hand, and stubby legs. Bas favors conviction in his job.
  - And is a white-bearded man with a lanky upper body, large legs, and feet. And favors compromise in his job.
  - Kerville is a young man with stubby legs, a large right arm, and a large right hand. Kerville favors acquittal in his job.
- Corgy (コーギー, Kōgī; Corgi): An official of the World Government who participated in the mission to gain the blueprints for Pluton and escort the prisoners Robin and Cutty Flam to Enies Lobby,^{[ch. 328]} and acted as the leader of the Government forces in the Sea Train, answering directly to the agents of CP9.^{[ch. 362]} Corgy is voiced by Hisao Egawa in the original Japanese version and by Charles C. Campbell in the Funimation dub.

=== Impel Down ===
Map of the sea current that connects Enies Lobby, Impel Down, and the previous base of Marineford.

Impel Down (インペルダウン, Inperu Daun) is one of three strongholds of the World Government and the world's greatest supermax prison where most of it is submerged underwater and surrounded by Sea Kings. In addition, any inmate with Devil Fruit powers are kept in special cells made of seastones. Impel Down has been split into different levels, with each having a hole that leads down to the next level.^{[ch. 525]} Monkey D. Luffy once entered Impel Down when looking for Portgas D. Ace only to later learn that he was shipped off to Marineford to be executed. This prison is the site of its one and only mass breakout caused by Monkey D. Luffy as both Buggy the Clown and the Blackbeard Pirates gained some recruits from the escaping inmates while others joined the Revolutionary Army.

Impel Down takes main inspiration by the prison of Alcatraz Island.

==== Hannyabal ====
Hannyabal (ハンニャバル, Hannyabaru) is the exceedingly ambitious Chief Warden, being the Vice Chief Warden before the two year timeskip.^{[ch. 526]} He often shows off how tough he is to the prisoners which earns him admiration among the guards.^{[ch. 536]} However, he cares more about his own position than the security of the prison.^{[ch. 535]} His weapon of choice is a double bladed naginata.^{[ch. 543]} Hannyabal became the new Chief Warden after Magellan's failure to stop the prison break caused by Luffy and Blackbeard. Hannyabal is voiced by Tetsuo Gotō in the original Japanese version and by Bradford Jackson in the Funimation dub.

==== Magellan ====
Magellan (マゼラン, Mazeran) is the Vice Chief Warden, being the Chief Warden before the two year timeskip. He has the ability of the Paramecia-type Venom-Venom Fruit (ドクドクの実, Doku Doku no Mi) that allows him to generate and manipulate poison as well as making him immune to any type of poison. However, his ability does not spare him from diarrhea caused by poisoned food. As a result, he spends about ten hours per day in the bathroom relieving himself.^{[ch. 528]} Following the mass prison break caused by Luffy and Blackbeard, Magellan was demoted to Vice Chief Warden. Magellan is voiced by Mitsuaki Hoshino in the original Japanese version and by Jeremy Inman in the Funimation dub.

==== Other Impel Down staff ====
Impel Down's staff include:

- Saldeath (サルデス, Sarudesu): A chief prison guard who wields a trident which also functions as a flute to direct his subordinates the Blugori when operating on Level 2.^{[ch. 528, 543]} Saldeath is voiced by Kazuya Nakai in the original Japanese version and by Orion Pitts in the Funimation dub.
- Sadie (サディ, Sadi): A sadistic woman who uses a thin torturing whip in battle.^{[ch. 543]} Saidie is in command of the Jailer Beasts on the lowest level of Impel Down. Sadie is voiced by Yuka Koyama in the original Japanese version and by Marissa Lenti in the Funimation dub.
- The Jailer Beasts are Impel Down staff members who have tapped into the Awakened power of their unnamed Zoan Devil Fruits which makes them larger than normal with some of them having runny noses as well as being able to recover from attacks quicker. Most of them are in their animal-human forms. The Jailer Beasts work for Sadie in Impel Down's lowest level. They consist of:
  - Minotaurus: A Jailer Beast who ate a Devil Fruit that enables him to turn into a Holstein cattle. Minotaurus is voiced by Kappei Yamaguchi in the original Japanese version and by Josh Martin in the Funimation dub.
  - Minorhinoceros: A Jailer Beast who ate a Devil Fruit that enables him to turn into a blue rhinoceros. Minorhinoceros is voiced by Hiromu Miyazaki in the original Japanese version.
  - Minokoala: A Jailer Beast who ate a Devil Fruit that enables him to turn into a koala. He mostly carries a bag of eucalyptus leaves which he enjoys eating. Minokoala is voiced by Keiji Hirai in the original Japanese version.
  - Minozebra: A Jailer Beast who ate a Devil Fruit that enables him to turn into a zebra. Minozebra is voiced by Takahiro Fujimoto in the original Japanese version.
  - Minochihuahua: A Jailer Beast who ate a Devil Fruit that enables him to turn into a chihuahua. He joined the group after the timeskip.^{[ch. 662]}

Impel Down has also utilized creatures to use on the inmates:

- A group of puzzle scorpions who can combine to form a centipede. They are found on Level 2.
- The Manticores are depicted as human-faced lions who can mimic voices.
- A group of giant rats found on Level 2.
- The Basilisk is a large creature depicted as a snake/chicken hybrid. It is found on Level 2.
- A Sphinx is a gigantic feathered human-faced lion who is in charge of the beasts of Level 2 and can mimic voices. The Sphinx is voiced by Yūichi Nagashima in the original Japanese version and by J. Michael Tatum in the Funimation dub.
- The Blugori are masked creatures resembling blue gorillas who work on Level 2.
- A vicious arctic wolf pack on Level 5.
- The anime also includes a giant-mouthed hippopotamus and a giant mantis, both found on Level 2.

=== Marineford ===
Marineford (マリンフォード, Marinfādo) was one of the three strongholds of the World Government and served as Marine Headquarters. After the Summit War of Marineford destroyed the island, the new Fleet Admiral Sakazuki switched Marine HQ with Marine Base G-1 in the New World, which became New Marineford. The island of Marineford was restored and converted to the new G-1.

=== Punk Hazard ===
Punk Hazard (パンクハザード島, Panku Hazādo-tō) is an island which is half hot and half cold, because Sakazuki and Kuzan fought there for the post of fleet admiral. Dr. Vegapunk once had a laboratory here. After Sakazuki and Kuzan's battle, Caesar Clown took control of the abandoned laboratory.

=== Egghead ===
Egghead (エッグヘッド, Egguheddo) is a Winter Island where Dr. Vegapunk resides and works. He developed the island into a futuristic island and has a tropical setting due to Dr. Vegapunk's Island A.C. unit. Egghead's factory level is called the Fabriophase, and contains a futuristic city and the Labophase laboratory. Egghead was later ravaged by a Buster Call during the Marines' invasion.

==== Dr. Vegapunk ====
Dr. Vegapunk (ベガパンク, Begapanku) is a scientist who is immersed in his work. While originally the director of MADS (which also consisted of Buckingham Stussy, Caesar Clown, Queen, and Vinsmoke Judge) before the group was arrested, Vegapunk was brought into the Marines as its head scientist.

Vegapunk originally had an enlarged head the size of a giant as a side effect of eating the Brain-Brain Fruit, which enabled him to absorb and store information. He would later split his brain and place them into his Punk Records. Vegapunk later created some satellites who assist in his research like the Seraphim Project that represent aspects of his personality.

At some point in the past, he had an encounter with Professor Clou D. Clover and learned about the people who had D in their name. Four years later, Vegapunk was saddened when Clover was killed in the destruction of Ohara. Around the time Egghead was constructed, he became good friends with Borsalino, Bartholomew Kuma, his adoptive daughter Jewelry Bonney and Sentomaru. Vegapunk gradually turned Kuma into a mindless cyborg in exchange for Bonney's medical treatment. Unbeknownst to the World Government, he had tampered with this experiment for the duo's benefit.

Vegapunk is first seen on Egghead when the Straw Hat Crew briefly visit the island. It was through him that they learned the true name of Monkey D. Luffy's Devil Fruit. Vegapunk is killed in the Marines' subsequent attack on Egghead which triggered a pre-recorded broadcast to the world. A clone of Vegapunk is brought to Elbaph as part of a contingency plan.

Dr. Vegapunk is voiced by Yoshito Yasuhara in episode 610 in the original Japanese version and Yōhei Tadano in later episodes of the original Japanese version. In the Crunchyroll dub, he is voiced by Kent Williams.

===== Shaka =====
Punk-01 is Shaka (シャカ), a man in a futuristic metal helmet who represents Vegapunk's goodness, making him the reasonable of Vegapunk's satellites. While trying to save Vegapunk, Shaka was shot in the head by York. Shaka's consciousness later inhabited Edison's body.

Shaka is voiced by Shūhei Sakaguchi in the original Japanese version and by Markus Lloyd in the Crunchyroll dub.

===== Lilith =====
Punk-02 is Lilith (リリス, Ririsu), a young woman who represents Vegapunk's evil. Lilith operates a giant mecha called the Vegaforce-01 and has power over the Sea Beast Weapons that she created. Lilith plans to resurrect the clone of Vegapunk upon building a laboratory with the necessary equipment as well as find a way to restore Bartholomew Kuma's mind. After finding an ancient factory on Elbaph, Lilith plans to make it her base of operations.

Lilith is voiced by Aya Hirano in the original Japanese version and by Madeleine Morris in the Crunchyroll dub.

===== Edison =====
Punk-03 is Edison (エジソン, Ejison), a child-sized mechanical creature who represents Vegapunk's thinking and wears a jet pack. During the Marines' attack on Egghead, Edison died from the injuries he sustained after previously passing through the Frontier Dome. Edison survived with the consciousness of his fallen satellite companions now inhabiting his body as he desynchronizes from the Punk Records to make York and the Marines think that he is dead. After using the machine that produces floating Island Clouds from the Cloud Factory to lift the Punk Records far from the reach of the Marines, Edison makes himself a new body with the parts of his fellow satellites.

Edison is voiced by Ryoko Shiraishi in the original Japanese version and by Lindsay Seidel in the Crunchyroll dub.

===== Pythagoras =====
Punk-04 is Pythagoras (ピタゴラス, Pitagorasu), a large mechanical creature with a detachable head who represents Vegapunk's wisdom. He was later destroyed by S-Snake, with his consciousness inhabiting Edison's body.

Pythagoras is voiced by Tokuyoshi Kawashima in the original Japanese version and by Aaron Dismuke in the Crunchyroll dub.

===== Atlas =====
Punk-05 is Atlas (アトラス, Atorasu), a large mechanical girl with drooping ears and a fuzzy tail who represents Vegapunk's violence. Atlas was responsible for being behind the creation of a cooking machine that can use an unknown substance to make a variety of food, lifelike holograms, and jetpacks. After knocking out Lilith to keep York from finding her, Atlas sacrificed herself to allow the Straw Hat Crew to get away from St. Ethanbaron V. Nusjuro and exploded afterwards. Atlas' conscious later inhabited Edison's body.

Atlas is voiced by Kaede Hondo in the original Japanese version and by Jad Saxton in the Crunchyroll dub.

===== York =====
Punk-06 is York (ヨーク, Yōku), a long-haired young woman who represents Vegapunk's greed. She conspires to abduct Vegapunk and become the only Vegapunk in the world.

York is voiced by Mutsumi Tamura in the original Japanese version and by Robin Clayton in the Crunchyroll dub.

==== Sentomaru ====
Sentomaru (戦桃丸, Sentōmaru) is a large man with a sumo wrestler-like build who was in command of the Marines' Science Unit and the bodyguard of Dr. Vegapunk ever since he was saved by him in his youth. In addition, he is shown to have control over the Pacifista units. Following the time skip, Sentomaru became a full-fledged Marine officer.

During the events at Egghead, Sentomaru helped out the Straw Hat Crew in their mission to rescue Vegapunk from York out of loyalty to Vegapunk. He was briefly captured by the Marines. After the Straw Hat Crew escape from Egghead, Sentomaru escapes from the Marines' custody and leaves Egghead on a rowboat.

Sentomaru is voiced by Kazue Ikura in the original Japanese version and by Greg Ayres in the Funimation dub.

==== Other Egghead inhabitants ====
- Emet (エメト, Emeto): Also known as the "Iron Giant" (鉄の巨人, Tetsu no Kyojin) is a legendary gigantic robot who was created 900 years ago and was friends with Joy Boy. During Luffy's fight with the Marines and the Five Elders, Emet reactivates and helps the Straw Hats escape from the Five Elders and Marines. Emet is voiced by Naomi Kusumi in the original Japanese version and Sonny Franks in the Funimation dub.
- The Mecha-Shark (メカシャーク, Mekashāku): A gigantic metallic shark created by Vegapunk.
- Vegaforce-01 (ベガフォース01, Begafōsu Wan): A giant mecha created by Vegapunk and piloted by Lilith.
- The Sea Beast Weapons (海獣兵器, Shī Bīsuto Uepon): Cybernetic-enhanced Sea Beasts created by Lilith.
- Recycle-Wan (リサイクルワン, Risaikuruwan): A mechanical dog created by Vegapunk.
- Joshu (ジョシュ) is Dr. Vegapunk's pet cat and assistant. Joshu is voiced by Hinako Takahashi in the original Japanese version.

== Seven Warlords of the Sea ==
The Seven Warlords of the Sea (七武海, Shichibukai), the full title being The Royal Seven Warlords of the Sea (王下七武海, Ōka Shichibukai), was a group of seven powerful pirates who are granted legal leniency to do as they please by the World Government and have their bounties void in exchange for a fraction of their loot and defeating weaker pirates, who deride them for selling out.^{[ch. 69,342]} The Seven Warlords are loosely based on the European privateers, government-endorsed pirates considered heroes in their homeland and pillagers in others.^{[ch. 260]}

At the beginning of the series, the group's members are Dracule Mihawk, Sir Crocodile, Donquixote Doflamingo, Bartholomew Kuma, Gecko Moria, Boa Hancock, and Jimbei.^{[ch. 69, 113, 234, 455, 516]} In the past another member was Hanafuda, who was replaced by Kuma.^{[vol. 111:SBS]} Following the exposure of Baroque Works, Crocodile is replaced by Blackbeard, who soon leaves the group, along with Jimbei, who resigns to side with Whitebeard against the World Government, and Moria, who is discarded by the World Government and narrowly escapes an assassination attempt.^{[ch. 474, 557, 576, 581, 595]}

The three open spots are eventually filled during the timeskip by Trafalgar Law, Buggy the Clown,^{[ch. 700]} and Edward Weevil.^{[ch. 802]} After Law and Doflamingo's actions in Dressrosa are exposed, they both are removed by the World Government. Later during the Reverie, under the direction of Nefertari Cobra and Riku Dold III, the member nations vote to abolish the Warlords and the remaining members are stripped of their positions and legal status outside of Kuma.^{[ch. 956]}

== Seraphim ==
The Seraphim (セラフィム, Serafimu) are Pacifistas created by Dr. Vegapunk for the Marines. Each of them is a cyborg clone of a known member of the Seven Warlords of the Sea who resemble their child appearances, spliced with King's Lunarian Lineage Factor that grants them Lunarian abilities, and have the Green Blood which enables them to copy the powers of a Devil Fruit. When CP0 infiltrated Egghead, they took control of the Seraphim to target their creator and his satellites. York later took over the Seraphim after capturing Vegapunk and the CP0 agents.

The currently named Seraphim are:

- S-Snake (S-スネーク, Esu-Sunēku): A Seraphim clone of Boa Hancock whose Green Blood enables her to copy the abilities of the Love-Love Fruit that Boa Hancock wields. S-Snake is voiced by Kotono Mitsuishi in the original Japanese version and by Lindsay Sheppard in the Crunchyroll dub.
- S-Hawk (S-ホーク, Esu-Hōku): A Seraphim clone of Dracule Mihawk whose Green Blood enables him to copy the abilities of the Dice-Dice Fruit that Daz Bonez wields. S-Hawk is voiced by Ryōhei Arai in the original Japanese version and by Eduardo Vildasol in the Crunchyroll dub.
- S-Bear (S-ベア, Esu-Bea): A Seraphim clone of Bartholomew Kuma whose Green Blood enables him to copy the abilities of the Paw-Paw Fruit that Bartholomew Kuma wields. S-Bear is voiced by Nobuhiko Okamoto in the original Japanese version and by Corey Wilder in the Crunchyroll dub.
- S-Shark (S-シャーク, Esu-Shāku): A Seraphim clone of Jimbei whose Green Blood enables him to copy the abilities of the Swim-Swim Fruit that Senor Pink wields. S-Shark is voiced by Chika Sakamoto in the original Japanese version and by Lexi Nieto in the Crunchyroll dub.

Apart from them, there are also three unnamed Seraphim who are clones of Sir Crocodile, Gecko Moria, and Donquixote Doflamingo.

== Critical reception ==
One Piece shows "the World Government as a corrupt and tyrannical regime that subjugates its citizens, engaging in practices such as slavery, torture, and arbitrary imprisonment." Many of the World Government's actions, such as the rampant enslavement of those not aligned with the World Government, as a fictional portrayal of the banality of evil.

== See also ==
- Straw Hats
- List of One Piece characters
- List of One Piece pirates
- Four Emperors (One Piece)
