= One Piece Movie: The Desert Princess and the Pirates: Adventures in Alabasta =

2007 Japanese anime film directed by Takahiro Imamura

- Cover art of the Region 1 DVD release

Japanese name
- Kanji: ONE PIECE エピソードオブアラバスタ 砂漠の王女と海賊たち
Transcriptions
- Revised Hepburn: Wan Pīsu: Episōdo obu Arabasuta Sabaku no Ōjo to Kaizoku-tachi
- Directed by: Takahiro Imamura
- Screenplay by: Hirohiko Kamisaka
- Based on: One Piece by Eiichiro Oda
- Starring: Mayumi Tanaka; Kazuya Nakai; Akemi Okamura; Kappei Yamaguchi; Hiroaki Hirata; Ikue Otani; Misa Watanabe; Yuriko Yamaguchi
- Cinematography: Takumi Wakao; Kōgo Ōnishi
- Edited by: Masahiro Gotō
- Music by: Kōhei Tanaka
- Production company: Toei Animation
- Distributed by: Toei Company, Ltd.
- Release date: March 3, 2007
- Running time: 90 minutes
- Country: Japan
- Language: Japanese
- Box office: $7,090,891

One Piece Movie: The Desert Princess and the Pirates: Adventures in Alabasta (Japanese: ONE PIECE エピソードオブアラバスタ 砂漠の王女と海賊たち, Hepburn: Wan Pīsu: Episōdo Obu Arabasuta: Sabaku no Ōjo to Kaizokutachi; lit. One Piece: Episode of Alabasta: The Desert Princess and the Pirates) is a 2007 Japanese anime action adventure fantasy film directed by Takahiro Imamura and written by Hirohiko Kamisaka. It is the eighth film in the One Piece film series, adapting a story arc from the original manga by Eiichiro Oda, wherein the Straw Hat Pirates travel to the Kingdom of Alabasta to save the war-and drought-plagued country from Sir Crocodile and his secret crime syndicate Baroque Works.

In Japan, the film was released on March 3, 2007, where it was shown alongside the Dr. Slump short Dr. Mashirito and Abale-chan. It peaked at second place of the weekend box office and grossed $7,075,924. Worldwide, the film has grossed a total of $7,090,891. The film was briefly shown at select theaters across the United States, before it was released on DVD in North America on February 19, 2008, and the Blu-ray released on January 27, 2009.

== Plot ==
While escorting princess Nefertari Vivi to her home in the kingdom of Alabasta, the Straw Hat Pirates briefly encounter Baroque Works member Mr. 2 Bon Clay; he demonstrates his devil fruit ability, which allows him to assume the form and voice of anyone whose face he has touched. After he leaves, Vivi explains to the Straw Hats how Baroque Works leader Crocodile, while posing at the country's hero, created an artificial drought that has lasted three years and manipulated Alabasta's rebel and royal armies into fighting each other, planning to take over the kingdom.

Upon reaching Alabasta, the Straw Hats find the rebels' base deserted and decide to intercept them at Alabasta's capital city, Alubarna. Crocodile and his partner Ms. All Sunday attempt to abduct Vivi, but Luffy stays behind and distracts him, allowing the others to escape. Crocodile defeats Luffy using his power to control sand, impaling him with his hook and burying him alive. In the port town of Nanohana, the rebel army, led by Vivi's childhood friend Koza, witnesses members of Baroque Works disguised as royal army soldiers set fire to the town. The rebels decide to attack Alubarna, where Mr. 2 impersonates the king, Nefertari Cobra, and orders the royal army to engage.

The Straw Hats recch Alubarna, where the officer agents of Baroque Works are waiting for them. The Straw Hats split up to lure the agents away, allowing Vivi to reach the approaching rebels. Usopp and Chopper defeat the officer agents Mr. 4 and Miss Merry Christmas, Sanji manages to defeat Mr. 2, Nami defeats Ms. Doublefinger, and Zoro learns to cut steel by defeating the blade-bodied Mr. 1. When her attempt to stop the rebels fails, Vivi rushes to the palace and convinces the acting royal army captain, Chaka, to blow up the palace to get the armies' attention and force them to listen. However, Crocodile and Ms. All Sunday appear and foil her plan. Koza witnesses Crocodile questioning the real Cobra, who stands nailed to the wall, about his knowledge of the ancient weapon Pluton. Realizing the deception, Koza and Chaka attack Crocodile, but are quickly defeated.

Crocodile engulfs the palace plaza in a sandstorm, sowing further confusion and violence among the armies. Vivi and the remaining Straw Hats learn of a bomb set by Baroque Works to wipe out both armies. The Straw Hats find the bomb in the city's clock tower, guarded by Mr. 7 and Miss Father's Day. Vivi takes out the agents, but discovers the bomb's timer has been activated. Royal guardsman Pell arrives and safely detonates the bomb in the sky, seemingly sacrificing himself.

Crocodile orders Cobra to lead him and Ms. All Sunday into the royal mausoleum, where the information on Pluton is supposedly kept. Ms. All Sunday tries to hide the information, knowing Crocodile plans to betray her, but he sees through her deception and stabs her. Luffy arrives, having been saved by Ms. All Sunday, and uses the moisture in his own blood to nullify Crocodile's powers. Crocodile stabs Luffy with his poisonous hook, but Luffy breaks it and defeats him before passing out. Vivi finally gets the armies' attention, and Koza and Chaka present Crocodile as the manipulator, stopping the fighting. Rain starts to fall, which lasts for three straight days.

Luffy awakens, having been given an antidote by Ms. All Sunday, and a banquet is held for the pirates. When news arrives that a marine fleet is on their way to Alabasta, the Straw Hats decide to quickly leave, with Vivi unsure whether to continue traveling with them. The next day, she appears at the coast to see them off, promising to remain their friend. In the aftermath, Alabasta is rebuilt, Pell is found (somehow) alive, and peace returns to the kingdom.

== Cast ==
- Mayumi Tanaka/Colleen Clinkenbeard as Monkey D. Luffy
- Kazuya Nakai/Christopher R. Sabat as Roronoa Zoro
- Akemi Okamura/Luci Christian as Nami
- Kappei Yamaguchi/Sonny Strait as Usopp
- Hiroaki Hirata/Eric Vale as Sanji
- Ikue Ohtani/Brina Palencia as Tony Tony Chopper
- Misa Watanabe/Caitlin Glass as Nefertari Vivi
- Ryūzaburō Ōtomo/John Swasey as Sir Crocodile (Mr. 0)
- Yuriko Yamaguchi/Stephanie Young as Nico Robin (Miss All Sunday)
- Iemasa Kayumi/Kyle Hebert as Nefertari Cobra
- Takeshi Kusao/Todd Haberkorn as Koza
- Kenji Nojima/Kevin M. Connolly as Pell
- Kihachirō Uemura/Robert McCollum as Chaka
- Kazuki Yao/Barry Yandell as Bon Clay (Mr. 2)
- Tetsu Inada/Brett Weaver as Daz Bones (Mr. 1)
- Yuko Tachibana/Leah Clark as Miss Doublefinger
- Masaya Takatsuka/Scott Hinze as Mr. 4
- Mami Kingetsu/Wendy Powell as Miss Merry Christmas
- Keisuke/Anthony Bowling as Mr. 7
- Tomoko Naka/Cynthia Cranz as Miss Father's Day
- Keiichi Sonobe/Antimere Robinson as Terracotta
- Takeshi Kusao/Mark Stoddard as Jaguar D. Saul
- Takeshi Aono/Christopher Bevins as Lasso

== Adaptations ==
Shueisha created two adaptations of the film: a film comic and a light novel, both titled Gekijōban One Piece: Episōdo obu Arabasuta: Sabaku no Ōjo to Kaizoku-tachi (劇場版One Piece エピソード オブ アラバスタ 砂漠の王女と海賊たち, lit. One Piece The Movie: Episode of Alabasta: The Desert Princess and the Pirates). The film comic (ISBN 978-4-08-874236-6) was released on March 4 and the light novel (ISBN 978-4-08-703178-2) on March 7, 2007.

The TV cut of the film, first aired in April of 2011 in Japan, adds a 15-minute prologue to the start of the film. The new section adapts the Whisky Peak arc in abridged form to explain how the crew met Vivi.

== Soundtrack ==
The score on the film's soundtrack was composed by Kōhei Tanaka, Shiro Hamaguchi, Yasunori Iwasaki, Minoru Maruo and Kazuhiko Sawaguchi. The ending theme "Compass" was written and performed by Ai Kawashima. For the English release, the score was used, and an English remake of "Compass" was created for use in the English dub, but a defect in the DVD caused the Japanese version to play instead. However, the English version was used in the theatrical release as well as the Blu-ray release.

== Reception ==
In its first week of showing, the film entered the Japanese weekend box office on place two. In its second and third week, it placed fourth and ninth, respectively, before falling out of the Top 10 the week after. In its fifth week of showing, the film re-entered the Top 10 for a final ninth place. In the Japanese market, the film's gross revenue summed up to $7,075,924. Including non-North American, foreign markets, the film made at total of $7,084,304 and after Funimation Entertainment's limited showing in the US, the figure rose to a worldwide total of $7,090,891.

Funimation Entertainment's DVD and Blu-ray releases of the film were also the subject of several reviews by a number of publications for films and anime. Carl Kimlinger of Anime News Network described the film as "a feature-length recap with slightly revised editing and a heavy layer of theatrical gloss" that is "Squeezing an enormous plot into a teeny little film like a man in mid-life crisis trying to squeeze into high-school jeans", but noted that "The soundtrack is a joy to listen to, rousing and fun". Bamboo Dong, another reviewer of Anime News Network, said that the film's pace is "anything but smooth" and that the battles are "cobbled together". She commented that the film is "syrupy good fun" for those who are fans of the series, but noted that for non-fans it will hold only "limited appeal". Although Todd Douglass Jr. of DVD talk said that "you really have to be affirmed in One Piece lore in order to full [sic] appreciate [it]" and commented that it felt "incomplete and unbalanced", he still recommended the film, stating that it is "short on story but ... a lot of fun." In regard to Funimation Entertainment's adaptation, he said that "[their] team does a great job of capturing the spirit and personalities of the show's characters."

Bryce Coulter of Mania Entertainment said that the film "cannot be recommended for someone who is not familiar with the series" but otherwise recommends it, cautiously, while commenting that it gives "a neat perspective" on its source material, but ultimately does not do it "any justice". In reference to the English adaptation he said that "the ... voice actors ... did a great job of portraying the Japanese cast." Davey C. Jones of Active Anime said that he liked the animation, in particular the backgrounds, and commented that the film "takes the character designs right out of the manga and TV show and ups them with theatrical quality shine." N.S. Davidson of IGN rated the film with 7 out of 10, stating that the animation is only "Slightly more sophisticated ... than in the television series" and that the film itself is "most likely ... for One Piece fans only." Dustin Somner of Blu-ray.com agreed on the film being primarily for fans, stating that the film's lack of context makes it "frustrating (with a capital 'F')" for those unfamiliar with the series.
