= One Piece season 8 =

One Piece
- Season 8 Water Seven
- The cover of the first DVD compilation released by Avex Mode of the eighth season.
- No. of episodes: 35

Release
- Original network: Fuji Television
- Original release: April 17, 2005 – April 30, 2006

Season chronology
- ← Previous; Season 7 Next → Season 9

The eighth season of the One Piece anime series contains the "Water Seven" chapter. Its episodes are directed by Kōnosuke Uda and Munehisa Sakai and produced by Toei Animation. The episodes are based on Eiichirō Oda's One Piece manga series, and adapt the 34th through 39th volumes of its source material over thirty-five episodes. They initially ran from April 17, 2005, through April 30, 2006, on Fuji TV. Twelve DVD compilations, each containing three episodes, were released by Toei between January 10 to December 5, 2007. In October 2011, Funimation announced they had acquired this season, along with the entirety of the previous season for release as part of their own US "Season Four". The press release stated that the episodes would be featured in 16:9 widescreen. The press release also mentioned that the episodes would be released in "HD" hinting at a possible Blu-ray release, but made no direct mention of the high definition disc format. However, the Japanese analog broadcasts are still in 4:3 fullscreen format.

The season centers around the intrigue of Water Seven as Nico Robin leaves the crew to seemingly join up with Cipher Pol No. 9, a hidden organization under the World Government as the Straw Hat Pirates are accused of an attempted assassination on Iceberg, the leader of Water Seven and the Galley-La Company. Meanwhile, most of their money is stolen from Usopp by Franky's henchmen before they could use it for repairs. Later, after finding out the Going Merry was unrepairable, Usopp leaves when Luffy reluctantly admits that the ship is done for and ends losing an official duel to Luffy.

The season uses five pieces of theme music: one opening theme and four ending themes. The opening theme is "Kokoro no Chizu" (ココロのちず) by BOYSTYLE. The four ending themes are "Mirai Kōkai" (未来航海) by Tackey & Tsubasa, used in the first two episodes; "Eternal Pose" (エターナルポーズ) by Asia Engineer, used to end episodes 231 to 245; "Dear friends" by TRIPLANE, used for episodes 246 to 255; and "Asu wa kuru kara" (明日は来るから) by TVXQ, which was used for the remainder of the season. In English speaking territories, "Mirai Koukai" was replaced with "Eternal Pose" due to music licensing issues.

== Episodes ==
No. overall	No. in season	Title	Directed by	Written by	Original release date	English air date (Note: Episodes were initially released in English on DVD, but to correspond with the Japanese column, the air dates refer to their first English television airings on Adult Swim's Toonami programming block. For information on DVD releases, please refer to the "Home Releases" section of this page.)
Water 7
229	1	"The Dashing Sea Train and the City of Water: Water Seven!"; Transliteration: "Shissō umi ressha to mizu no miyako Uōtā Seven" (Japanese: 疾走海列車と水の都ウォーターセブン)	Directed by : Munehisa Sakai; Storyboarded by : Kenji Yokoyama	Hirohiko Kamisaka	April 17, 2005	October 27, 2013
After the Going Merry narrowly escapes being hit by a "sea train" which knocks away the giant frog attempting to derail it, the Straw Hats meet the stationmaster Kokoro along with her granddaughter Chimney and her bunny-like cat Gonbe. Kokoro assures the crew that the frog, Yokozuna, was perfectly fine and that it was always testing its strength against the Sea Train Puffing Tom, which connects several of the nearby islands. She also explains that the Log Pose would lead them to Water Seven, a canal city of shipwrights where they could fix their ship, providing Luffy with a map and letter of introduction to the shipwrights' leader Iceburg. The Straw Hats reach Water Seven, the group splits up with Luffy, Nami and Usopp leaving to exchange their gold and rent boats driven by fish-like sea monsters called Yagaras.
230	2	"Adventure in the City on the Water! Head to the Mammoth Shipbuilding Plant!"; Transliteration: "Suijō toshi no bōken! Mezase kyodai sōsen kōjō" (Japanese: 水上都市の冒険!目指せ巨大造船工場)	Directed by : Kōnosuke Uda; Storyboarded by : Takahiro Imamura	Hirohiko Kamisaka	April 24, 2005	November 3, 2013
Luffy, Nami, and Usopp get strange greetings from the residents and they get to experience the roller coaster-like channels of Water Seven. Luffy find out that some pirates had been beaten at the hands of some powerful craftsmen; the Galley La Company. Meanwhile, Chopper loses Robin when she is approached by a masked figure when Zoro encounters strange figures that came to the Going Merry.
231	3	"The Franky Family and Iceberg!"; Transliteration: "Furankī ikka to Aisubāgu-san" (Japanese: フランキー一家とアイスバーグさん)	Yoshio Mukainakano	Hirohiko Kamisaka	May 1, 2005	November 10, 2013
Zoro awakens and drives off the "Franky Family", a gang of hoodlum pirate hunters. Luffy's group gets the gold they acquired from Skypeia exchanged for 300,000,000 berries. They soon reach Dock No. 1 and meet a man who resembles Usopp, Galley La's carpenter foreman Kaku, who jumps off to inspect the Going Merry while they speak to Iceberg. Usopp loses the money in his care to the Franky Family.
232	4	"Galley-La Company! A Grand Sight: Dock #1!"; Transliteration: "Garēra Kanpanī! Soukan ichiban Dokku" (Japanese: ガレーラカンパニー!壮観一番ドック)	Directed by : Kōnosuke Uda; Storyboarded by : Ken Koyama	Hirohiko Kamisaka	May 15, 2005	November 17, 2013
The Franky Family nearly escape with the Straw Hats' money were it not for untimely intervention of Galley La's Paulie while he was evading debt collectors, with another member named Rob Lucci keeping him from running off with the money. Iceberg's aide Kalifa shows Luffy, Nami, and Usopp around Dock No. 1 and tells them how Iceberg founded the Galley La Company. Usopp and the 200,000,000 berries he was carrying go missing as Kaku returns from the Going Merry and tells them that their keel is irreparably damaged.
233	5	"Pirate Abduction Incident! A Pirate Ship That Can Only Await Her End!"; Transliteration: "Kaizoku yūkai jiken to shi o matsu dake no kaizokusen" (Japanese: 海賊誘拐事件と死を待つだけの海賊船)	Directed by : Hiroaki Miyamoto; Storyboarded by : Kenji Yokoyama	Hirohiko Kamisaka	May 22, 2005	November 24, 2013
Luffy refuses to believe that Galley La cannot repair the Going Merry before he and Nami realize that not only is Usopp missing now, but the two brief cases that were returned to them are empty. Nami decides to head to Franky House and finds Usopp on the way in a pitiful state, heading back to the ship for help while Usopp goes to the Franky House himself.
234	6	"Rescuing Our Friend! Raid On the Franky House!"; Transliteration: "Nakama kyūshutsu! Nagarikomi Furankī Hausu" (Japanese: 仲間救出!殴りこみフランキーハウス)	Hidehiko Kadota	Hirohiko Kamisaka	June 5, 2005	December 1, 2013
Luffy, Sanji, Zoro, and Chopper follow Usopp's bloody trail to the Franky House, where they find him passed out in front after being beaten up in an attempt to get the money back from the Franky Family's leader Franky, who left with the money. The four of them proceed to overpower the Franky Family and destroy the Franky House, deducing that the money is likely gone while Luffy accepts that the Going Merry is beyond repair.
235	7	"Big Fight Under the Moon! The Pirate Flag Flutters With Sorrow!"; Transliteration: "Gekka no dai kenka! Kanashimi ni hirugaeru kaizoku hata!" (Japanese: 月下の大喧嘩!哀しみに翻る海賊旗!)	Katsumi Tokoro	Hirohiko Kamisaka	June 12, 2005	January 5, 2014
Once they're back on the ship, Luffy explains to a guilt-ridden Usopp that the Going Merry can no longer be repaired and has chosen to get a new ship instead. Usopp believes that Luffy has abandoned the dignity of their ship and says he's leaving the crew, challenging Luffy to an official duel at nighttime.
236	8	"Luffy vs. Usopp! Collision of Two Men's Pride!"; Transliteration: "Rufi VS Usoppu! Butsukaru otoko no iji" (Japanese: ルフィvsウソップ!ぶつかる男の意地)	Munehisa Sakai	Hirohiko Kamisaka	June 19, 2005	January 12, 2014
Usopp fights Luffy in order to decide who keeps the Going Merry; going all out while keeping a hesitant Luffy on his toes as he and others remember their time with Usopp. Even after taking a harsh beating, Luffy defeats Usopp before he and the crew leave him and the ship behind.
237	9	"Severe Shock Hits the City of Water! Iceberg Targeted!"; Transliteration: "Gekishin mizu no miyako! Newareta Aisubāgu" (Japanese: 激震水の都!狙われたアイスバーグ)	Yoko Ikeda	Hirohiko Kamisaka	July 3, 2005	January 19, 2014
The Straw Hats get themselves a hotel room as Nami finds the crew on the roof and informs them that Iceberg has been shot. As the Galley La Company frantically search for answers, Luffy and Nami decide to check on his condition – only to be met by closed gates. At the same time, Franky returns to Water Seven and goes after Luffy to exact his revenge for destroying the Franky House – with style.
238	10	"Gum-Gum Human vs. Fire-Breathing Cyborg!"; Transliteration: "Gomugomu ningen VS hi o fuku kaizō ningen" (Japanese: ゴムゴム人間VS火を吹く改造人間)	Yoshio Mukainakano	Hirohiko Kamisaka	July 10, 2005	January 26, 2014
In the streets outside of the hospital, Luffy fights Franky as the latter reveals himself to be a cyborg. Inside, Iceberg recalls seeing Nico Robin and another tall man before he was shot. The Galley La company run outside and stop Franky and Luffy and tell them that they suspect the Straw Hat Pirates of the crime.
239	11	"The Straw Hat Pirates Are the Culprits? The Protectors of the City of Water!"; Transliteration: "Hannin wa mugiwara kaizokudan? Mizu no miyako no yōjinbo" (Japanese: 犯人は麦わら海賊団?水の都の用心棒)	Morio Hatano	Hirohiko Kamisaka	July 31, 2005	February 2, 2014
The Galley La Company continues to fight Luffy with an enraged Franky attempting to take both sides out. An incredibly high tide called the "Aqua Laguna" is coming and Chopper and Sanji rush to warn Usopp. Luffy raises some chaos in order to meet with Iceberg and he demands to know what's happening. Iceberg says he wants to see Robin one more time.
240	12	"Eternal Farewell? Nico Robin: The Woman Who Draws Darkness!"; Transliteration: "Eien no wakare? Yami o hiku onna Niko Robin" (Japanese: 永遠の別れ?闇を引く女ニコ·ロビン)	Hiroaki Miyamoto	Hirohiko Kamisaka	August 7, 2005	February 9, 2014
In a bar, while recharging his soda reserves, Franky talks with Kokoro about her theory that Iceberg was shot by an agent of World Government's shadow organization CP9. The rumors she speaks of seem to have some truth as we see Robin meeting with CP9 members. While the crew hide from angry residents, Sanji and Chopper indirectly warn Usopp of Aqua Laguna before discovering Robin, who informs them of what they've feared: she's responsible and she wants to part ways.
241	13	"Capture Robin! The Determination of the Straw Hats!"; Transliteration: "Robin o tsukamaero! Mugiwara ichimi no ketsui" (Japanese: ロビンを捕まえろ!麦わら一味の決意)	Hidehiko Kadota	Hirohiko Kamisaka	August 14, 2005	February 16, 2014
Chopper reunites with the others without Sanji and they discuss what's happened. Luffy decides that they need to catch Robin to know the full truth. Usopp attempts to repair the ship enough to withstand the Aqua Laguna and the Straw Hats make their way to the Galley La Company.
242	14	"Cannon Fire Is the Signal! CP9 Goes Into Action!"; Transliteration: "Aizu wa hōgeki to tomo ni! Ugokidashita CP9" (Japanese: 合図は砲撃と共に!動き出したCP9)	Katsumi Tokoro	Hirohiko Kamisaka	August 21, 2005	February 23, 2014
The Straw Hats rush to Galley La as three CP9 agents commence their raid. Robin and the mysterious man that shot Iceberg enter Iceberg's room due to the latter's Devil Fruit powers. The masked-man informs him that CP9 framed the pirates and seeks blueprints he kept hidden and would've passed down to Paulie. Luffy separates from his group.
243	15	"CP9 Takes Off Their Masks! Their Shocking True Faces!"; Transliteration: "Kamen o totta CP9! Sono odoroki no sugao" (Japanese: 仮面を取ったCP9!その驚きの素顔)	Kōnosuke Uda	Hirohiko Kamisaka	September 4, 2005	March 2, 2014
Robin speaks with Iceberg while the masked man leaves to keep anyone from interfering. She learns that Iceberg possesses the blueprints to the ultimate warship, Pluton. Elsewhere, Luffy is tied up with Paulie after the latter reveals to masked CP9 agents that the blueprints are fake. This forces the CP9 agents to regroup in Iceberg's room to interrogate him while revealing their true identities as Lucci, Kaku, Kalifa, and Blueno.
244	16	"Secret Bond! Iceberg and Franky!"; Transliteration: "Hisometa kizuna! Aisubāgu to Furankī" (Japanese: 秘めた絆!アイスバーグとフランキー)	Munehisa Sakai	Hirohiko Kamisaka	September 11, 2005	March 9, 2014
Lucci tells Iceberg their hypothesis from learning of the decoy blueprints and has Kaku check Iceberg's pulse to confirm that he gave the blueprints to another: a fellow apprentice of his mentor Tom named Cutty Flam, who now goes by Franky. The Straw Hat Pirates and Paulie break into the room where they find Iceberg and CP9. Meanwhile, Franky learns of Usopp working on the Going Merry and decides to capture him.
245	17	"Come Back, Robin! Showdown With CP9!"; Transliteration: "Kaette koi Robin! CP9 to no taiketsu!" (Japanese: 帰って来いロビン!CP9との対決!)	Hidehiko Kadota	Hirohiko Kamisaka	September 18, 2005	March 16, 2014
Luffy and the others request that Robin comes back to the crew. She refuses and tells them that she cannot accomplish her "wish" if she were to stay with them. Robin turns to leave and while CP9 hold the pirates back while intent silence them, Iceberg, and Paulie. Robin successfully escapes and Lucci decides to use the remaining time before the building goes up in flames to unveil his "transformation" into a hybrid leopard.
246	18	"The Straw Hat Pirates Annihilated? The Menace of the Leopard Model!"; Transliteration: "Mugiwara kaizokudan zenmetsu? Moderu hyō no kyōi" (Japanese: 麦わら海賊団全滅?モデル豹の脅威!)	Yoko Ikeda	Hirohiko Kamisaka	October 23, 2005 (Note: Episode 246 aired as part of a special alongside episodes of Sazae-san and Chibi Maruko-chan.)	March 23, 2014
Lucci explains he acquired the power of a Zoan Devil Fruit; the Cat-Cat Fruit, Model: Leopard, before quickly disposes of Luffy and Zoro while CP9 tie up Paulie and Iceberg, leaving them alone as the building slowly burns down around them. In Franky's underground hideout, Usopp tells him his story and Franky is finally touched. In return, Franky tells him a little about Tom's contributions to Water Seven.
247	19	"The Man Who Is Loved Even by His Ship! Usopp's Tears!"; Transliteration: "Fune kara mo aisareta otoko! Usoppu no namida!" (Japanese: 船からも愛された男!ウソップの涙!)	Morio Hatano	Hirohiko Kamisaka	October 30, 2005	March 30, 2014
Usopp believes that the person who repaired the Going Merry in Skypeia was really the ship itself, with Franky explaining that the ship was inhabited by a spirit who manifests on ships who are dearly cared for and the Going Merry repaired itself so the Straw Hats can reach the next island. When attempting to stop Franky from destroying the Going Merry in an act of mercy for the ship's sake, Usopp admits he knows be cannot bring himself to abandon the ship. The doorbell rings from the sea side and the CP9 agents enter, after attacking Franky's men.
248	20	"Franky's Past! The Day the Sea Train First Ran!"; Transliteration: "Furankī no kako! Umi ressha ga hashitta hi" (Japanese: フランキーの過去!海列車が走った日)	Hiroaki Miyamoto	Hirohiko Kamisaka	November 6, 2005	April 6, 2014
The CP9 agents overpower Franky and discover a hidden room that they tear through to Franky's dismay of them trampling his memories. A long flashback ensues, covering Franky's past in Tom's Workers and how he and Iceberg helped create the Sea Train so Tom can save their city while not be held accountable for creating Gold Roger's ship.
249	21	"Spandam's Scheme! The Day the Sea Train Shook!"; Transliteration: "Supandamu no inbō! Umi ressha ga ureta hi" (Japanese: スパンダムの陰謀!海列車が揺れた日)	Katsumi Tokoro	Hirohiko Kamisaka	November 13, 2005	April 13, 2014
Eight years prior to the Straw Hats reaching Water Seven, a CP5 agent named Spandam seeks to acquire the Pluton blueprints from Tom by any means to give the World Government an advantage against all pirates. As Franky walked into the town on the day that Tom would be a free man, Spandams flunkies stage an attack with the battleships that Franky personally constructed. Tom and Iceberg run to their shipyard where they're attacked by two ships which also destroy the others, they and Franky brought before the judge for trial. Franky denounces his ships with a provoked Tom punching him, taking him to acknowledge every ship he ever made or he'll never forgive him.
250	22	"The End of the Legendary Man! The Day the Sea Train Cried!"; Transliteration: "Densetsu no otoko no saigo! Umi ressha ga naita hi" (Japanese: 伝説の男の最期!海列車が泣いた日)	Ken Koyama	Hirohiko Kamisaka	November 27, 2005 (Note: The episodes 250 and 251 aired together as a one-hour special.)	April 20, 2014
After telling Franky to take pride in the ships he created, Tom takes a swing at Spandam before confessing to the attack while asking the judge to alter the arrangement to resolve him and his apprentices of the crime while taken to Enies Lobby and be executed for building Roger's ship. Franky, after disfisguring Spandam with the butt of a rifle, falses in his attempt to stop the train to Enies Lobby with his bare hands and was presumed dead by everyone. In the present, after being restrained, Franky finally learns that Spandam is now actually the leader of CP9.
251	23	"The Truth Behind Her Betrayal! Robin's Sorrowful Decision!"; Transliteration: "Uragiri no shinsō! Robin no kanashiki ketsui!" (Japanese: 裏切りの真相!ロビンの哀しき決意!)	Munehisa Sakai	Hirohiko Kamisaka	November 27, 2005	April 27, 2014
Chopper escapes the burning building with Paulie and Iceberg on his back and collapses outside. Iceberg tells Nami that CP9 threatened to destroy the Straw Hats if Robin didn't cooperate with them. Nami rushes to tell Chopper so they can go looking for the rest of the crew. Elsewhere, the CP9 agents let go of the Going Merry so she would be destroyed at sea.
252	24	"The Steam Whistle Forces Friends Apart! The Sea Train Starts to Run!"; Transliteration: "Nakama o hikihanasu kiteki! Hashiridasu umi ressha" (Japanese: 仲間を引き離す汽笛!走り出す海列車)	Directed by : Yukihiko Nakao; Storyboarded by : Kenji Yokoyama	Hirohiko Kamisaka	December 4, 2005	May 4, 2014
Paulie helps clear the name of the Straw Hats but doesn't tell the mob everything he knows. He gets the mob to follow Chopper so they can search for the rest of the crew. Nami goes her own way so she can rush to the Sea Train. As Nami nears the station, Sanji, ahead of her, approaches the train.
253	25	"Sanji Barges In! Sea Train Battle in the Storm!"; Transliteration: "Sanji totsunyū! arashi no naka no umi ressha batoru!" (Japanese: サンジ突入!嵐の中の海列車バトル!)	Yoko Ikeda	Hirohiko Kamisaka	December 11, 2005	May 11, 2014
Nami and the conductors are rescued by Paulie when the Aqua Laguna floods the main station. A man hands Nami a letter he found from Sanji. It informs her that Usopp, Franky, and he are on board the train that had just departed. On board, he storms the cars. High up in the city, Nami speaks with Kokoro and spots Luffy, stuck in between two buildings, in the back streets where the Aqua Laguna will hit first.
254	26	"Nami's Soul Cries Out! Straw Hat Luffy Makes a Comeback!"; Transliteration: "Nami tamashii no sakebi! Mugiwara no Rufi fukukatsu!" (Japanese: ナミ魂の叫び!麦わらのルフィ復活!)	Morio Hatano	Hirohiko Kamisaka	January 22, 2006	May 18, 2014
Nami finally reaches Luffy and shouts him that he needs to hurry before Robin reaches Enies Lobby. Chopper finds Zoro and hands him the Sandai Kitetsu so he can escape the chimney. Luffy pushes apart the buildings he was stuck between and Paulie grabs them all so they can escape the Aqua Laguna's massive wave.
255	27	"Another Sea Train? Rocketman Charges Forth!"; Transliteration: "Mō hitotsu no umi ressha? Rokettoman shutsugeki" (Japanese: もう一つの海列車?ロケットマン出撃)	Ken Koyama	Hirohiko Kamisaka	January 29, 2006	May 25, 2014
Sanji fights his way through another train car and finds Usopp and Franky. Seeing how determined Luffy is to save Robin, Kokoro and Iceberg lends the Straw Hat crew the use of another sea train, Rocket Man. The Franky Family shows up, pleading with Luffy to let them join them because they'll do anything for their leader.
256	28	"Rescue Our Friends! A Bond Among Foes Sworn with Fists!"; Transliteration: "Nakama o sukue! Kobushi ni chikatta teki dōshi no kizuna!" (Japanese: 仲間を救え!拳に誓った敵同士の絆!)	Hiroaki Miyamoto	Hirohiko Kamisaka	February 5, 2006	June 1, 2014
The Rocket Man finally makes it out to sea. As the train connects with the tracks, Luffy has to rescue Chimney before she's thrown off by the wind. In the meanwhile, Iceberg has a flashback about when he finally met Franky again in Water Seven. With Luffy and Chimney safe in the train, Paulie tells his fellow carpenters who the real culprits were. The Straw Hats, Franky Family, and Galley La Company form an alliance.
257	29	"Smash the Wave! Luffy and Zoro Use the Strongest Combo!"; Transliteration: "Nami o sake! Rufi to Zoro no saikyō gattai waza" (Japanese: 波を砕け!ルフィとゾロの最強合体技)	Yukihiko Nakao	Hirohiko Kamisaka	February 26, 2006	June 8, 2014
Luffy and Zoro perform a move that acts similar to a cannon and blasts a hole through the wall of the tidal wave ahead of them, opening up a channel for them to pass through. They miraculously pass through unscathed and the passengers rejoice. Sanji contacts the rest of the crew and fills them in on his current situation. Usopp separates from them but later, when Sanji and Franky are spotted, a mysterious masked man named Sniperking comes to their rescue.
258	30	"A Mysterious Man Appears?! His Name Is Sniperking!"; Transliteration: "Nazo no otoko tōjō!? Sono na wa Sogekingu!" (Japanese: 謎の男登場!?その名はそげキング!)	Munehisa Sakai	Hirohiko Kamisaka	March 5, 2006	June 15, 2014
Sniperking makes his grand entrance. Franky and Sanji aren't fooled by his costume but they try to humor him. They devise a plan first, then detach the last two cars and fight their way through the rest. Back in the Rocket Man, Luffy, Zoro, Nami, and Chopper get an outfit change; Nami shows off the weapon Usopp upgraded for her while he was still with them.
259	31	"Showdown Between Cooks! Sanji vs. Ramen Kenpo"; Transliteration: "Kokku taiketsu! Sanji VS Rāmen kenpō" (Japanese: コック対決!サンジVSラーメン拳法)	Ken Koyama	Hirohiko Kamisaka	March 12, 2006	June 22, 2014
Kalifa updates the CP9 on the situation with Franky, Sanji, and Sniperking. Sanji tells Franky and Sniperking to go on without him so he can fight Wanze and his "Ramen Kenpo". Franky begins to fight Nero, CP9's "Weasel", and Sogeking meets with Robin.
260	32	"Rooftop Duel! Franky vs. Nero"; Transliteration: "yane no ue no kettō! Furankī VS Nero" (Japanese: 屋根の上の決闘!フランキーVSネロ)	Yoko Ikeda	Hirohiko Kamisaka	March 19, 2006	June 29, 2014
Franky's fight with Nero continues. Nero discovers that Franky's weak spot is his back, so Franky lies down flat so he can't get to it. Nero demands that he fight seriously, so Franky gets up to transform into his "Centaur" form. Sniperking talks with Robin and tells her that the crew knows about her reasons for leaving. Those on the Rocket Man encounter the discarded cars and Zoro slices them so they can pass, before coming across a bisected Sea king.
261	33	"Clash! Demon-Slasher Zoro vs. Ship-Slasher T-Bone!"; Transliteration: "Gekitotsu! Onigiri Zoro VS funegiri T Bōn" (Japanese: 激突!鬼斬りゾロVS船斬りTボーン)	Directed by : Morio Hatano; Storyboarded by : Makiko Orimoto	Hirohiko Kamisaka	April 2, 2006 (Note: Episode 261 aired as part of a special alongside episodes of Sazae-san, Chibi Maruko-chan, and Kochikame.)	July 6, 2014
Zoro clashes with "Ship Cutter" T-Bone. The fight is short and Zoro joins the crew again in the Rocket Man. On the Puffing Tom, Sanji beats Wanze beautiful, though Wanze thinks he's ruined his face. Franky finally gains the upper hand against Nero and defeats him. After beating their respective opponents, Franky and Sanji stand to fight against the other CP9.
262	34	"Scramble over Robin! A Cunning Plan by Sniperking!!"; Transliteration: "Robin sōdatsusen! Sogekingu no kisaku!!" (Japanese: ロビン争奪戦!そげキングの奇策!!)	Yukihiko Nakao	Hirohiko Kamisaka	April 16, 2006	July 13, 2014
After hiding under Robin's cloak, Sniperking finally shows himself. They stumble into the room with the CP9 and meet with Sanji and Franky. Sogeking produces a smokescreen. The four head into another car, detach it, and escape. It's not long before Bluno pulls their car back, though. Franky knocks down the wall so they can escape but ends up on the enemy car. Blueno opens a door then back in the Straw Hat car.
263	35	"The Judicial Island! Full View of Enies Lobby!"; Transliteration: "Shihō no shima! Eniesu Robī no zenbō" (Japanese: 司法の島!エニエス·ロビーの全貌!)	Hiroaki Miyamoto	Hirohiko Kamisaka	April 30, 2006	July 20, 2014
Robin willingly follows Blueno into his improvised door and Sniperking and Sanji are left alone. For a while, Blueno explains a little of Robin's past involving the Buster Call. Back at the Rocket Man, Yokuzuna the frog jumps onto the front of the train, knocking them from the rails. After Kokoro speaks with him, he joins the group. The CP9, Franky and Robin finally reach Enies Lobby and disembark.

== Home media release ==
=== Japanese ===
Avex Mode (Japan, Region 2 DVD)
Volume		Episodes	Release date	Ref.
8thシーズン ウォーターセブン篇	piece.01	229–231	January 10, 2007	
8thシーズン ウォーターセブン篇	piece.02	232–234	February 7, 2007	
8thシーズン ウォーターセブン篇	piece.03	235–237	March 7, 2007	
8thシーズン ウォーターセブン篇	piece.04	238–240	April 11, 2007	
8thシーズン ウォーターセブン篇	piece.05	241–243	May 9, 2007	
8thシーズン ウォーターセブン篇	piece.06	244–246	June 6, 2007	
8thシーズン ウォーターセブン篇	piece.07	247–249	July 11, 2007	
8thシーズン ウォーターセブン篇	piece.08	250–252	August 1, 2007	
8thシーズン ウォーターセブン篇	piece.09	253–255	September 5, 2007	
8thシーズン ウォーターセブン篇	piece.10	256–258	October 10, 2007	
8thシーズン ウォーターセブン篇	piece.11	259–261	November 7, 2007	
8thシーズン ウォーターセブン篇	piece.12	262–263	December 5, 2007	
ONE PIECE Log Collection	“WATER SEVEN”	229–247	December 21, 2011	
ONE PIECE Log Collection	“ROCKET MAN”	248–263	January 27, 2012	

=== English ===
In North America, this season was recategorized as part of "Season Four" for its DVD release by Funimation Entertainment. The Australian Season Four sets were renamed Collection 18 through 21.

Funimation Entertainment (USA, Region 1), Manga Entertainment (UK, Region 2), Madman Entertainment (Australia, Region 4)
Volume		Episodes	Release date			ISBN	Ref.
Volume		Episodes	USA	UK	Australia	ISBN	Ref.
Season Four	Voyage Two	218–229	October 30, 2012	N/A	January 9, 2013	ISBN 1-4210-2598-1	
Season Four	Voyage Three	230–241	December 18, 2012	N/A	March 20, 2013	ISBN 1-4210-2615-5	
Season Four	Voyage Four	242–252	March 19, 2013	N/A	June 19, 2013	ISBN 1-4210-2647-3	
Season Four	Voyage Five	253–263	May 14, 2013	N/A	August 21, 2013	ISBN 1-4210-2680-5	
Collections	Collection 9	206–229	April 15, 2014	April 13, 2015	N/A	ISBN 1-4210-2850-6	
Collections	Collection 10	230–252	October 28, 2014	June 15, 2015	N/A	ISBN N/A	
Collections	Collection 11	253–275	January 13, 2015	August 10, 2015	N/A	ISBN N/A	
Treasure Chest Collection	Three	206-299	N/A		December 7, 2016	ISBN N/A	
Voyage Collection	Five	206-252	N/A		December 6, 2017	ISBN N/A	
Voyage Collection	Six	253-299	N/A		January 10, 2018	ISBN N/A	
