= Fengxi =

Fengxi may refer to the following places in China:

- Fengxi District (枫溪管理区), a specified area in Chao'an District, Chaozhou, Guangdong, which is directly administrated by the Chaozhou government
  - Fengxi Town, Guangdong (枫溪镇), a town in Chao'an District
- Fengxi, Hubei (丰溪镇), a town in Zhuxi County, Hubei
- Fengxi Township, Mingxi County (枫溪乡), a township in Mingxi County, Fujian
- Fengxi Township, Pucheng County (枫溪乡), a township in Pucheng County, Fujian
- Fengxi Subdistrict, Zhuzhou (枫溪街道), a subdistrict of Lusong District in Zhuzhou, Hunan
- Fengxi Subdistrict, Shangrao (丰溪街道), a subdistrict of Guangfeng District in Shangrao, Jiangxi

== Mythology ==
- Fengxi (mythology), a Chinese mythological creature

== See also ==
- Feng Xi (died 222), general of Shu Han
