= Tomoko Naka =

Japanese voice actress (born 1963)

- Born: March 22, 1963 (age 63); Osaka, Osaka Prefecture
- Occupation: Actress

Tomoko Naka (中友子, Naka Tomoko; born March 22, 1963 in Osaka Prefecture) is a Japanese actress.

== Filmography ==
=== Television animation ===
- Sara in Dragon Quest (1990)
- Shigeru Fujiki, Sawai-san, Atsuko Nomura, Osada-kun in Chibi Maruko-chan (1990)
- Shizuko, Warsman (young) in Kinnikuman: Kinnikusei Oui Soudatsu-hen (1991)
- Fukuda-kun in Papuwa (1992)
- Tsutomu's Mother in Neighborhood Story (1995)
- Albert, Emma in Remi, Nobody's Girl (1996)
- Hina, Miss Fathers' Day, Michael, and Belladonna, Woman Zombie, Zombie in One Piece (2001)
- Mercury's Mother in Full Metal Panic? Fumoffu (2003)
- Oha Kuro Bettari in GeGeGe no Kitaro (2007)
- An in Saint Seiya Omega (2012)

Unknown date

- Shigeru Fujiki, Sawai, Atsuko Nomura in Chibi Maruko-chan TV 2
- Joanie in Coji-Coji
- Sara in Dragon Warrior
- Baba in I'm Gonna Be An Angel
- Ina-chan and Santa in Kingyo Chuuihou!
- Nanako-sensei in Sally the Witch 2
- Souko Shikatani in Muka Muka Paradise
- Masa Smith in Porphy no Nagai Tabi
- Yuina Himoo in Tokimeki Memorial
- Fur Gots in Other Life: Azure Dreams

=== Film Animation ===
- Donbe in Dr. Slump & Arale-chan Ncha! Penguin Mura wa Hare no chi Hare (1993)
- Miss Fathersday in One Piece: The Desert Princess and The Pirates: Adventure in Alabasta (2007)

=== Video games ===
- Yuina Himoo in Tokimeki Memorial (1994)
- Laura in D (video game) (1995)
- Tessa in Red Earth (1996)

=== Dubbing ===
- Bill (Season 2–7), Annie (Season 1–8), Stephen Hatt (Season 1), Bridget Hatt (Season 5) and Mrs. Kyndley (Season 2) in Thomas & Friends (1990-2007)
- Annie and the Tumbleweed in Thomas and the Magic Railroad (2000)
