= Itsumade =

Eerie bird in Japanese folklore

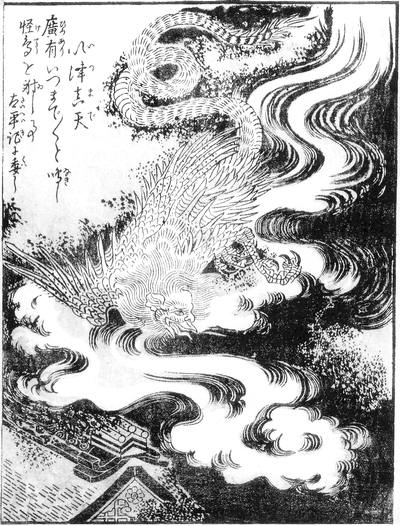
"Itsumade" (以津真天) from the Konjaku Gazu Zoku Hyakki (1779) by Toriyama Sekien

Itsumade (Japanese: 以津真天) is an eerie bird featured in the Japanese collection of Yōkai pictures, the Konjaku Gazu Zoku Hyakki by Toriyama Sekien published in 1779. Its picture has the explanatory text, "as explained more fully in the Taiheiki, Hiroari shot the eerie bird that cries, 'itsumade itsumade'" (広有 いつまでいつまでと鳴し怪鳥を射し事 太平記に委し), so it depicts the odd bird that appears in the Taiheiki (circa 14c), volume 12, "Hiroari Shot the Eerie Bird" (広有射怪鳥事, "Hiroari Keteu wo Iru Koto").

== The eerie bird in Taiheiki ==
According to the Taiheiki, around the fall of 1334 (in the Kenmu years), an epidemic illness was causing many deaths and almost every night, an eerie bird appeared on top of the Shishinden (ja:紫宸殿) crying "itsumade itsumade" (until when? Until when?) causing great fear. The nobility thought back to how the master of arrows Minamoto no Yorimasa slew the nue and made a request to Oki Jirōzaemon Hiroari (ja:真弓広有) who splendidly shot down the eerie bird with a kabura-ya. It is said that the eerie bird had a human-like face, a curved beak, saw-like teeth, a snake-like body, talons as sharp as swords, and a wingspan of about 1 jō and 6 shaku (about 4.8 meters).

In the Taiheiki, the bird is merely written to be the "eerie bird" with no distinctive name. The "Itsumade" name in the Konjaku Gazu Zoku Hyakki is considered to be a naming Sekien made upon illustrating this story in the Konjaku Gazu Zoku Hyakki on the basis of the bird's cry. In various Edo Period illustrations of battle, this bird was depicted as a monstrous bird or black cloud in order to convey the idea, but among them none to be found that use the name "Itsumade."

== Explanatory text starting in Shōwa ==
Yōkai-related literature starting in Shōwa began to also give the reading "Itsumadeten." They also sometimes come introduced with explanatory text that say things such as how this eerie bird stops nearby the corpses of those who died from battle or starvation and cry "itsumade itsumade" (Until when? Until when?), basically meaning "until when will this corpse be left here?" or how this eerie bird is the vengeful spirit (onryō) of those who died that way, turned into a bird.

== In popular culture ==
Itsumade, alternatively as Itsumaden, has been featured in various fantasy productions such as GeGeGe no Kitarō, Hell Teacher: Jigoku Sensei Nube, Garo, Nioh, Touhou Project, Fate/Grand Order, Z/X, Onmyōji, and Phantom Beast Story.

In One Piece, the character St. Marcus Mars can take the yōkai-like form of Itsumade.

== See also ==
- List of legendary creatures from Japan
- Nue
