= One Piece season 7 =

One Piece
- Season 7 Escape! The Naval Fortress & the Foxy Pirate Crew

The Log Collection home media cover arts for
Navaron (L) and Foxy (R), which respectively released on August 26, 2011, and December 21, 2011
- No. of episodes: 33

Release
- Original network: Fuji Television
- Original release: June 20, 2004 – March 27, 2005

Season chronology
- ← Previous; Season 6 Next → Season 8

The seventh season of the One Piece anime series are produced by Toei Animation and directed by Kōnosuke Uda adapted from Eiichiro Oda's manga of the same name. The season was released in Japan as a single chapter, called "Escape! The Naval Fortress & the Foxy Pirate Crew". It deals with the Straw Hat Pirates' infiltration of and escape from a Marine fortress to reclaim their confiscated treasure. The Straw Hats later meet Foxy the Silver Fox and his crew, who challenges them to the Davy Back Fight, a competition involving battles between Foxy's crew and Luffy's crew. Soon after, they encounter Aokiji, a Marine admiral who is determined to capture Nico Robin, but spares the crew after defeating Luffy.

The season began broadcasting on Fuji Television on June 20, 2004, and ended March 27, 2005, lasting 33 episodes. One Piece began airing in high definition, 16:9 format from the 207th episode. Despite this, the Japanese DVD release and analog broadcasts remained in 4:3 fullscreen format until the beginning of the 8th season for the DVD releases.

Funimation released the first ten episodes of the season in English as the conclusion their own US "Season Three" on April 19, 2011. In October, they announced that they had acquired the remaining episodes, along with the entirety of the following season for release as part of "Season Four". Funimation released each of the Season's episodes in their original aspect ratio. Beginning with this season, One Piece also made its return to Toonami, now a Saturday night block on Adult Swim, in its uncut form. Continuing from episode 207, the season debuted on May 19, 2013. The previous season had aired on Toonami in 2008, during the weekend block's original run on Cartoon Network.

The episodes use four pieces of theme music throughout the series. The first opening theme, titled "Bon Voyage" by Bon-Bon Blanco in Japanese and Brina Palencia in English, and the ending theme, titled "Dreamship" and performed by Aiko Ikuta in Japanese and Jessi James in English continues to be used for the beginning of the season. The second opening and ending themes, used from episode 207 to 228, are "Kokoro no Chizu" (ココロのちず; lit. Map of the Heart) and "Mirai Koukai" (未来航海; lit. Future Voyage), respectively performed by Boystyle and Tackey & Tsubasa. In English speaking territories, "Mirai Koukai" was replaced with "Eternal Pose" (the following ending theme) due to music licensing issues.

== Episodes ==
No. overall	No. in season	Title	Directed by	Written by	Original release date	English air date (Note: Episodes were initially released in English on DVD, but to correspond with the Japanese column, the air dates refer to their first English television airings on Adult Swim's Toonami programming block, unless otherwise noted. No dates are used for episodes 196 through 206 as they did not air on television in English. These episodes were, however, released on DVD. For further information on DVD releases, please refer to the "Home Releases" section of this page.)
G-8
196	1	"A State of Emergency is Issued! A Notorious Pirate Ship has Infiltrated!"; Transliteration: "Hijō Jitai Hatsumei! Akumei Takaki Kaizokusen Sennyū" (Japanese: 非常事態発令!悪名高き海賊船潜入!)	Takahiro Imamura	Hirohiko Kamisaka	June 20, 2004	—
The Marines are convinced the Going Merry is a ghost ship after it crashes inside their fortress from above. The crew members are scattered around the premises.
197	2	"Sanji the Cook! Proving His Merit at the Marine Dining Hall!"; Transliteration: "Ryōrinin Sanji! Kaigun Shokudō de Shinka Hakki!" (Japanese: 料理人サンジ!海軍食堂で真価発揮!)	Ken Koyama	Michiru Shimada	July 4, 2004	—
In disguise, Sanji shows the Marine chefs the proper way to prepare a meal.
198	3	"Captured Zoro! Chopper's Emergency Operations!"; Transliteration: "Towareta Zoro to Choppā Kinkyū Shittō" (Japanese: 囚われたゾロとチョッパー緊急執刀!)	Hiroyuki Kakudō	Junki Takegami	July 11, 2004	—
Zoro is taken prisoner as Chopper and Nami assist a nervous doctor in treating injured Marines.
199	4	"The Marines Dragnet Closes In! The Second Member Captured!"; Transliteration: "Hakaru Kaigun no Sōsamō! Towareta Futarime!" (Japanese: 迫る海軍の捜査網!囚われた二人目!)	Mamoru Hosoda	Yoshiyuki Suga	July 18, 2004	—
Robin and Usopp both disguise themselves as the same visiting inspector, and Usopp is thrown in the brig with Zoro. Luffy and Sanji are discovered by Jonathan after a slight mishap.
200	5	"Luffy and Sanji's Daring Rescue Mission!"; Transliteration: "Kesshi no Rufi to Sanji! Kūshutsu Daisakusen!" (Japanese: 決死のルフィとサンジ!救出大作戦!)	Munehisa Sakai	Hirohiko Kamisaka	August 8, 2004	—
The real Inspector is thrown in the brig with Zoro and Usopp, while Sanji and Luffy race to rescue the two while avoiding detection.
201	6	"Enter the Hot-Blooded Special Forces! Battle on the Bridge!"; Transliteration: "Netsuketsu Tokubetsu Butai Sansen! Burijji Kōbōsen!" (Japanese: 熱血特別部隊参戦!ブリッジ攻防戦!)	Hidehiko Kadota	Michiru Shimada	September 5, 2004	—
Sanji and Luffy, after freeing Usopp and Zoro, try to escape Navarone. As the Burning Soul combat unit is deployed, Dr. Kobato leads Nami and Chopper to the docks.
202	7	"Breaking Through the Siege! The Going Merry is Recovered!"; Transliteration: "Hōimō Toppa! Dakkan Gōingu Merī-gō" (Japanese: 包囲網突破!奪還ゴーイングメリー号)	Kōnosuke Uda	Yoshiyuki Suga	September 19, 2004	—
The crew meets at the docks and are surrounded by Marines. Using Nami as their fake hostage, they trick the Marines into letting them back on the Going Merry.
203	8	"The Pirate Ship Disappears! Fortress Battle, Round #2!"; Transliteration: "Kieta Kaizokusen! Yōsai Kōbō Dai 2 Raundo" (Japanese: 消えた海賊船!要塞攻防第2ラウンド)	Hiroyuki Kakudō	Junki Takegami	September 26, 2004	—
The crew disguises the Going Merry as a Marine ship so they can get their treasure back. With the gold, they decide they'll hire a shipwright.
204	9	"The Gold and Waver Recovery Operations!"; Transliteration: "Ōgon Dakkan Sakusen to Ueibā Kaishū Sakusen!" (Japanese: 黄金奪還作戦とウエイバー回収作戦!)	Katsumi Tokoro	Hirohiko Kamisaka	October 3, 2004	—
Usopp splits up the crew into two teams: the gold retrieval team and the waver retrieval team. Inspector Shepherd decides to catch Luffy on his own.
205	10	"The One Fell Swoop Plan! Jonathan's Surefire Secret Tactic!"; Transliteration: "Ichimōdajin Keikaku! Jonasan Jishin no Hisaku!" (Japanese: 一網打尽計画!ジョナサン自信の秘策)	Ken Koyama	Yoshiyuki Suga	October 3, 2004	—
Luffy, Zoro, Usopp, and Robin continue to search for their treasure. Luffy leads Nami to the captain's quarters where they retrieve their gold.
206	11	"Farewell, Marine Fortress! The Last Battle for Escape!"; Transliteration: "Saraba Kaigun Yōsai! Dasshutsu e no Saigō no Kōbō" (Japanese: さらば海軍要塞!脱出への最後の攻防)	Takahiro Imamura	Junki Takegami	October 10, 2004	—
The Going Merry is grounded during a period of low tide and Jonathan believes they've reached "checkmate". They cleverly use the impact dial to boost the ship and the breath and flame dials to inflate the octopus balloon again so they can escape.
Long Ring Long Land
207	12	"Great Adventure in Long Ring Long Land!"; Transliteration: "Rongu Ringu Rongu Rando no Daibōken!" (Japanese: ロングリングロングランドの大冒険!)	Directed by : Junichi Fujise; Storyboarded by : Kenji Yokoyama	Hirohiko Kamisaka	October 31, 2004	May 19, 2013
Luffy and company come across a mysterious pirate ship after trying to escape a giant wave. Soon, they arrive on an island inhabited by strange animals. Going Merry is captured by the Foxy Pirate crew.
208	13	"A Davy Back with the Foxy Pirates!"; Transliteration: "Fokushī Kaizokudan to Dēbī Bakku!" (Japanese: フォクシー海賊団とデービーバック!)	Hiroyuki Kakudō	Hirohiko Kamisaka	November 7, 2004	May 26, 2013
After Tonjit re-unites with his horse, they are soon attacked by Captain Foxy and his subordinates, who challenge Luffy in a Davy Back Fight, a contest of pirates where the stakes are members of the crew.
209	14	"Round 1! One Lap of the Donut Race!"; Transliteration: "Dai Ikkaisen! Gururi Ishū Dōnatsu Rēsu" (Japanese: 第一回戦!ぐるり一周ドーナツレース)	Hidehiko Kadota	Hirohiko Kamisaka	November 14, 2004	June 2, 2013
The first round of Davy Back Fight involves a race around the island with tiny boats. Zoro's and Chopper's boat is eliminated.
210	15	"Silver Fox Foxy! The Merciless Interference!"; Transliteration: "Gin Gitsune no Fokushī! Mōretsu Bōgai Kōsei!" (Japanese: 銀ギツネのフォクシー!猛烈妨害攻勢)	Ken Koyama	Hirohiko Kamisaka	November 21, 2004	June 9, 2013
With only Luffy, Nami, and Porche's boat remaining, it's an all out war to the goal, but after Foxy exposes his Devil Fruit powers, Porche wins and takes Tony Tony Chopper from Luffy. The second round prepares to start.
211	16	"Round 2! Shoot It into the Groggy Ring!"; Transliteration: "Dai Ni Kaisen! Buchikome Gurokkī Ringu!" (Japanese: 第二回戦!ブチ込めグロッキーリング)	Takahiro Imamura	Junki Takegami	November 28, 2004	June 16, 2013
Without Chopper, Sanji and Zoro must face the Foxy Pirates in a ball game, but are hampered by their blatant cheating and the crooked referee.
212	17	"A Barrage of Red Cards in Groggy Ring!"; Transliteration: "Reddo Kādo Renpatsu! Gurokkī Ringu" (Japanese: レッドカード連発!グロッキーリング)	Katsumi Tokoro	Junki Takegami	December 5, 2004	June 23, 2013
The bickering rivals Sanji and Zoro manage to overcome the opposing team by working together. Luffy chooses Tonjit's horse, Sherry over Chopper.
213	18	"Round 3! The Round-and-Round Roller Race!"; Transliteration: "Daisan Kaisen! Guruguru Rōrā Rēsu!" (Japanese: 第三回戦!ぐるぐるローラーレース!)	Munehisa Sakai	Hirohiko Kamisaka	December 12, 2004	June 30, 2013
The Straw Hats face Foxy in a race around a giant ring on roller skates.
214	19	"A Seriously Heated Race! Into the Final Round!"; Transliteration: "Hakunetsu Bakusō Rēsu! Saishū Raundo Totsunyū" (Japanese: 白熱爆走レース!最終ラウンド突入!)	Hiroyuki Kakudō	Hirohiko Kamisaka	December 19, 2004	July 7, 2013
Thanks to some quick planning, the Straw Hats win the race.
215	20	"Screaming-Hot Bombardment! Pirate Dodgeball!"; Transliteration: "Unaru Netsukyū Gōkyu! Kaizoku Dojjibōru!" (Japanese: うなる熱球剛球! 海賊ドッジボール!)	Ken Koyama	Hirohiko Kamisaka	January 9, 2005	July 14, 2013
With Luffy's victory, he takes Chopper back, but foolishly accepts another challenge by Foxy.
216	21	"Showdown on the Cliff! Red Light, Green Light!"; Transliteration: "Dangai no Kessen! Daruma-san ga Koronda!" (Japanese: 断崖の決戦!だるまさんがころんだ!)	Hidehiko Kadota	Yoshiyuki Suga	January 9, 2005	July 21, 2013
Foxy decides to take Robin from Luffy this time because of her Devil Fruit ability. The next match is a race to the top of the island.
217	22	"The Captains Square Off! The Final Combat Round!"; Transliteration: "Kyaputen Taiketsu! Saishūsen Konbatto!" (Japanese: キャプテン対決!最終戦コンバット!)	Yoko Ikeda	Hirohiko Kamisaka	January 16, 2005	July 28, 2013
With Chopper gone again from Luffy's crew, Luffy and Foxy face off in the final game: a battle of brawn aboard Foxy's ship.
218	23	"Full-Blast Slow-Slow Onslaught Vs. Invulnerable Luffy!"; Transliteration: "Zenkai Noro Noro Kōgeki vs Fujimi no Rufi" (Japanese: 全開ノロノロ攻撃VS不死身のルフィ)	Hiroyuki Kakudō	Hirohiko Kamisaka	January 23, 2005	August 4, 2013
Luffy continues to battle Foxy with the odds not in his favor, and the fight continues inside Foxy's ship.
219	24	"Epic, Heated Combat! The Fateful Final Conclusion!"; Transliteration: "Sōzetsu Nettō Konbatto! Unmei no Saishū Ketchaku!" (Japanese: 壮絶熱闘コンバット!運命の最終決着)	Takahiro Imamura	Hirohiko Kamisaka	January 30, 2005	August 11, 2013
Luffy manages to finally defeat Foxy by using his ability against him. After dismissing his new crewmembers, the Straw Hats leave in search for a shipwright.
Ocean's Dream
220	25	"Was It Lost? Stolen? Who Are You?"; Transliteration: "Ushinatta? Ubawareta? Omae wa Dare da?" (Japanese: 失った?奪われた?おまえはだれだ?)	Munehisa Sakai	Junki Takegami	February 6, 2005	August 18, 2013
A mysterious figure appears during the night and steals the memories of the crew. In the morning, Robin is the only one who remembers the Straw Hats adventures together. Her attempts to keep the crew together fail as Nami and Zoro go separate ways.
221	26	"A Mysterious Boy With a Horn and Robin's Deduction!"; Transliteration: "Fude o Daita Nazo no Shōnen to Robin no Suiri!" (Japanese: 笛を抱いた謎の少年とロビンの推理!)	Katsumi Tokoro	Hirohiko Kamisaka	February 13, 2005	August 25, 2013
Robin suggests that only those who were sleeping lost their memories. Luffy and the others then remember seeing the mysterious boy who played some kind of flute. Later that night, they discover the boy outside and Luffy tries to fight him. At the last second, he proclaims his memory has returned.
222	27	"Now, Let's Get Back Our Memories! The Pirate Crew Lands On the Island!"; Transliteration: "Iza Kioku o Dakkan seyo! Kaizokudan Shima ni Jōriku" (Japanese: いざ記憶を奪還せよ!海賊団島に上陸)	Ken Koyama	Yoshiyuki Suga	February 20, 2005	September 8, 2013
During the night, Usopp, Chopper, and Sanji question what brought them to the Going Merry. In the morning, Usopp builds them a raft and they sail to the island where they meet Nami again. Meanwhile, the boy sets his sights on Zoro.
223	28	"Zoro Bares His Fangs! A Savage Animal Stands in the Way!"; Transliteration: "Kiba o Muku Zoro! Tachihadakatta Yajū" (Japanese: 牙をむくゾロ!立ちはだかった野獣!)	Hidehiko Kadota	Junki Takegami	February 27, 2005	September 15, 2013
On their way to "The Palace of the Sea God" Robin's group meets an entranced Zoro. It looks like Zoro wants to fight so Luffy urges the others to keep going without him. They apprehend the kid but the whistle was what was really stealing their memories. Zoro returns, still entranced, but Luffy's nowhere to be seen.
224	29	"The Last Counterattack by the Memory Thief Who Reveals His True Colors!"; Transliteration: "Honsei o Arawashita Kioku Dorobō no Saigo no Gyakushū" (Japanese: 本性を現した記憶泥棒の最後の逆襲!)	Takahiro Imamura	Hirohiko Kamisaka	March 6, 2005	September 22, 2013
Luffy returns and knocks some sense into Zoro. Cornered, the sea horse spreads illusions of the people in their memories to distract them. It steals their complete memories and claims that it has become a Sennenryu. Luffy defeats it and returns all the memories but the townspeople are convinced they're the memory stealers.
Foxy's Return
225	30	"Proud Man! Silver Fox Foxy!"; Transliteration: "Hokori Takaki Otoko! Gin Gitsune no Fokushī" (Japanese: 誇り高き男!銀ギツネのフォクシー)	Yoko Ikeda	Yoshiyuki Suga	March 13, 2005	September 29, 2013
Luffy rescues Foxy, Hamburg, and Porche from a storm at sea. When they reunite with the Sexy Foxy ship, they find it captained by somebody new. Foxy accepts a Davy Back Fight in order to regain his ship and crew. Donning the afro once again, Luffy vows to defeat the captain.
226	31	"The Guy Who's the Closest to Invincible? And the Most Dangerous Man!"; Transliteration: "Mottomo Muteki ni Chikai Yatsu? To Mottomo Kiken na Otoko!" (Japanese: 最も無敵に近い奴?と最も危険な男!)	Directed by : Katsumi Tokoro; Storyboarded by : Eisaku Inoue	Yoshiyuki Suga	March 20, 2005	October 6, 2013
Once Foxy wins back his crew, he captures the Straw Hats. Luffy and Nami fight Foxy and although he's defeated, his crew accepts him back. Later, they sail to an island where they meet someone Robin knows in big horror; a Marine named Aokiji.
227	32	"Navy Headquarters Admiral Aokiji! The Ferocity of an Ultimate Powerhouse!"; Transliteration: "Kaigun Hombu Taishō Aokiji! Saikō Senryoku no Kyōi" (Japanese: 海軍本部大将青キジ!最高戦力の脅威)	Directed by : Hidehiko Kadota; Storyboarded by : Kenji Yokoyama	Yoshiyuki Suga	March 27, 2005	October 13, 2013
The man they met, Marine High Admiral Aokiji, appears to be incredibly lazy. He first displays his Devil Fruit's ability by freezing the sea so some deserted people can get off the island. Unfortunately, he's determined to catch Robin. Luffy, Sanji, and Zoro attack but they seem to be no match.
228	33	"Duel Between Rubber and Ice! Luffy vs. Aokiji!"; Transliteration: "Gomu to Koori no Ikkiuchi! Rufi VS Aokiji!" (Japanese: ゴムと氷の一騎打ち!ルフィVS青キジ)	Directed by : Yoko Ikeda; Storyboarded by : Eisaku Inoue	Hirohiko Kamisaka	March 27, 2005	October 20, 2013
Robin is frozen by Aokiji and Luffy tells the others to escape with her. In the Going Merry, Usopp and Chopper try to thaw her in the shower. Luffy gets frozen and defeated, but his life is spared as Aokiji believes he must repay the debt the marines incurred from Crocodile's defeat at Luffy's hands. With the crew defrosted, they continue sailing as usual. Zoro spots the giant frog they heard about and they chase it to an island with a lighthouse, but it appears they'll sink before they get there.

== Home media release ==
=== Japanese ===
Avex Mode (Japan, Region 2 DVD)
Volume		Episodes	Release date	Ref.
7thシーズン 脱出!海軍要塞&フォクシー篇	piece.01	196–198	February 1, 2006	
7thシーズン 脱出!海軍要塞&フォクシー篇	piece.02	199–201	March 1, 2006	
7thシーズン 脱出!海軍要塞&フォクシー篇	piece.03	202–204	April 5, 2006	
7thシーズン 脱出!海軍要塞&フォクシー篇	piece.04	205–207	May 3, 2006	
7thシーズン 脱出!海軍要塞&フォクシー篇	piece.05	208–210	June 7, 2006	
7thシーズン 脱出!海軍要塞&フォクシー篇	piece.06	211–213	July 5, 2006	
7thシーズン 脱出!海軍要塞&フォクシー篇	piece.07	214–216	August 2, 2006	
7thシーズン 脱出!海軍要塞&フォクシー篇	piece.08	217–219	September 6, 2006	
7thシーズン 脱出!海軍要塞&フォクシー篇	piece.09	220–222	October 11, 2006	
7thシーズン 脱出!海軍要塞&フォクシー篇	piece.10	223–225	November 8, 2006	
7thシーズン 脱出!海軍要塞&フォクシー篇	piece.11	226–228	December 6, 2006	
ONE PIECE Log Collection	"NAVARON"	196–206	August 26, 2011	
ONE PIECE Log Collection	"FOXY"	207–228	December 21, 2011	

=== English ===
In North America, this season was recategorized as part of "Season Three" and "Four" for its DVD release by Funimation Entertainment. The Australian Season sets were renamed Collection 16 through 18.

Funimation Entertainment (USA, Region 1), Manga Entertainment (UK, Region 2), Madman Entertainment (Australia, Region 4)
Volume		Episodes	Release date			ISBN	Ref.
Volume		Episodes	USA	UK	Australia	ISBN	Ref.
Season Three	Fifth Voyage	196–205	April 19, 2011	N/A	December 14, 2011	ISBN 1-4210-2261-3	
Season Four	Voyage One	206–217	August 7, 2012	N/A	October 24, 2012	ISBN 1-4210-2520-5	
Season Four	Voyage Two	218–229	October 30, 2012	N/A	January 9, 2013	ISBN 1-4210-2598-1	
Collections	Collection 8	183–205	September 25, 2012	November 3, 2014	N/A	ISBN 1-4210-2580-9	
Collections	Collection 9	206–229	April 15, 2014	April 13, 2015	N/A	ISBN 1-4210-2850-6	
Treasure Chest Collection	Two	104–205	N/A		October 31, 2013	ISBN N/A	
Voyage Collection	Four	157–205	N/A		November 18, 2017	ISBN N/A	
Voyage Collection	Five	206–252	N/A		December 6, 2017	ISBN N/A	
