= Keiichi Sonobe =

Japanese voice actor

- 園部 啓一
- Born: September 16, 1960 (age 65)
- Occupation: Voice actor

Keiichi Sonobe (園部 啓一, Sonobe Keiichi; born September 16, 1960) is a male Japanese voice actor from Tokyo affiliated with 81 Produce.

== Roles ==
=== Television animation ===
- Agatha Christie's Great Detectives Poirot and Marple (Inspector Mirā)
- Ai Yori Aoshi (Yōda)
- Azuki-chan (Tako-sensei, Sendai's uncle)
- Bobobo-bo Bo-bobo (Jelly Jiggler)
- Buso Renkin (Shishaku Chōno)
- Detective Conan (Masao Horī, Medical examiner, judge)
- Detective School Q (Criminal)
- Digimon Adventure (Kokatorimon)
- Digimon Frontier (Eldest Kokuwamon, Gōtomon)
- Dragon Ball Super (Lord Zuno)
- Fullmetal Alchemist (Mason)
- Geisters (Nikiasu Sarakia)
- Gin Tama (Mysterious Thief Fundoshi Mask)
- Hakugei: Legend of the Moby Dick (Doc)
- Higurashi When They Cry (Motodai)
- Jujutsu Kaisen (Ogi Zen'in)
- Kamiwaza Wanda (Ichiban-Hoshi Teru, device computer voice)
- Kiddy Grade (Criminal)
- Kindaichi Case Files (Detective, Tamasaburō Ichikawa, Ryō Yagisawa, Detective Takada)
- Le Chevalier D'Eon (Vorontsov)
- Macross 7 (Doctor Chiba)
- MÄR (Maira)
- MegaMan NT Warrior series (Mahajarama Yahoot)
- Mirmo! (Rarumu)
- Mobile Suit Victory Gundam (Oliver Inoe)
- Monkey Typhoon (Briggins)
- Monster (Shōne)
- One Piece (Thalassa Lucas, Igaram, Terracotta, Rapa Nui, Bushon, Marcus Mars, McKinley, Mekao, Princess (Center Baskerville), Spoil, Silvers Rayleigh)
- Pokémon Advanced Generation (Team Aqua member A)
- Renkin 3-kyū Magical? Pokān (Regurā)
- Sgt. Frog (Robobo)
- Tonde Burin (Kondo Masayoshi, clerk)
- Toriko (Koppowo)
- Konjiki no Gash Bell!! (Sebastian, Bago)
- Zoids: Chaotic Century (Doctor D)
- Zoids: Genesis (Para)

=== Theatrical animation ===
- Episode of Alabasta: The Desert Princess and the Pirates (Terracotta)

=== Video games ===
- Daraku Tenshi - The Fallen Angels (Tarō)
- Final Fantasy Crystal Chronicles: Ring of Fates (Alhanalem)
- Super Robot Wars series (Oliver Inoe)
- Jumping Flash! & Jumping Flash! 2 (Baron Aloha, Kumagoro 2, MuuMuu)

=== Drama CDs ===
- Tsumi Series (Ken'ichi Osame)

=== Dubbing roles ===
==== Live-action ====
- 24 (fourth season) (Marwan's subordinate)

==== Animation ====
- Batman: The Brave and the Bold (Captain Cold, Kobra)
- The Cramp Twins (Mr. Cramp)
- Donkey Kong Country (General Klump)
- Insektors (Protokol, palace guard)
- Kipper the Dog (Tiger)
- Waking Life (Steven Soderbergh)
- The Wild Thornberrys Movie (Nigel Thornberry)

=== Tokusatsu roles ===
- Denji Sentai Megaranger (Boss Kunekune/King Kunekune (ep. 14))
- Mirai Sentai Timeranger (Mad Scientist Genbu (ep. 25 - 26))
- Hyakujuu Sentai GaoRanger (Tombstone Org (ep. 29))
- Ninpuu Sentai Hurricaneger ("Back To" Ninja Octonyuudou (ep. 14))
- Bakuryuu Sentai Abaranger (Trinoid #7: Jishakunagengorou (ep. 7, 13))
- Tokusou Sentai Dekaranger (Gimonlian Angorl (ep. 49))
- GoGo Sentai Boukenger (Tsukumogami Nendogami (ep. 14))
- Kamen Rider Den-O (Ivy Imagin (ep. 11 - 12))
- Samurai Sentai Shinkenger (Ayakashi Tsubotoguro (ep. 42))
- Kaizoku Sentai Gokaiger (Zaggai (ep. 13 - 14))
- Shuriken Sentai Ninninger (Yokai Fudagaeshi (ep. 43))
