= Fengxi (mythology) =

Chinese mythological creature

Chinese name
- Chinese: 封狶
Transcriptions
Standard Mandarin
- Hanyu Pinyin: fēngxī
- IPA: [fə́ŋ.ɕí]

Japanese name
- Kanji: 封豨
- Kana: ほうき
Transcriptions
- Romanization: Hōki

Fengxi (Chinese: 封狶), also known as Hōki in Japanese, is a boar-like monster in Chinese mythology. He is said to have two heads and lives in Morus forests. Some accounts refer to it as the ancient rain deity.

== Description ==
Fengxi is depicted as a two-head boar with great force. Other depictions have it with four long tusks. He is very brutal and always terrorises the countryside.

According to Huainanzi, Fengxi destroyed a lot of villages and their farming lands while killing many people, which angered the Emperor Yao who sent the great archer Hou Yi to get it hunted in a morus forest.

According to Jiaoshi Yilin and Lüshi Chunqiu, Fengxi is the ancient Chinese rain deity. According to Records of the Grand Historian, when Fengxi appears, there will be rain soon.

According to I Ching, as raining (云雨) stands for mating in ancient China, Fengxi might also be the ancient fertility deity.

== In popular culture ==
A member of the Five Elders in One Piece, St. Topman Warcury, has the ability to turn into a yāoguài-like form that resembles a Fengxi.
