= List of One Piece pirates =

Several pirates in One Piece belonging to the following factions: the Four Emperors, Seven Warlords of the Sea, and Worst Generation.

This is a list of fictional pirates and pirate crews in the One Piece manga by Eiichiro Oda. This article does not include pirates originating from the One Piece films or video games.

Initially two of the three great powers are pirates: the Four Emperors and the Seven Warlords of the Sea, with the Marines making up the third great power. Before their abolition, the Seven Warlords were privateers aligned with the World Government, which exists in a delicate balance of power with the Four Emperors.

== Straw Hats ==
The protagonists of One Piece are the Straw Hat Crew, led by Captain Monkey D. Luffy.

=== Straw Hat Grand Fleet ===
After the events chronicled in Dressrosa, several pirate crews swear their allegiance to Luffy as his subordinates.

== Four Emperors ==
The Four Emperors are a group of four powerful pirates; each controls and protects their own territory within the New World, the latter half of the Grand Line.

== Seven Warlords of the Sea ==
Every known member of the Seven Warlords of the Sea aside from Hanafuda. By row, from left to right: 1. (Top) Blackbeard, Sir Crocodile, Jinbe; 2. Trafalgar Law, Donquixote Doflamingo; 3. Bartholomew Kuma, Gecko Moria; 4. Dracule Mihawk, Buggy, Boa Hancock; 5. (Bottom) Edward Weevil

Seven Warlords
Warlord	Devil Fruit	Seraphim	Fate	Anime voice actor(s)		Live actor(s)
Warlord	Devil Fruit	Seraphim	Fate	JP	US	Live actor(s)
Hanafuda	—N/a		Stripped after defeat	—N/a		
Dracule Mihawk	—N/a	S-Hawk	Stripped after Reverie	Takeshi Aono Hirohiko Kakegawa	Wayne Grayson John Gremillion	Steven John Ward Theo Le Ray
Sir Crocodile	Sand-Sand	Unnamed	Stripped for organized crime	Ryūzaburō Ōtomo	David Brimmer John Swasey	Joe Manganiello
Donquixote Doflamingo	String-String	Unnamed	Stripped for organized crime	Hideyuki Tanaka	Robert McCollum	TBD
Bartholomew Kuma	Paw-Paw	S-Bear	Stripped after Reverie	Hideyuki Hori	Joel McDonald	TBD
Gecko Moria	Shadow-Shadow	Unnamed	Stripped after defeat	Katsuhisa Hōki	Chris Guerrero	TBD
Boa Hancock	Love-Love	S-Snake	Stripped after Reverie	Kotono Mitsuishi	Lydia Mackay	TBD
Jimbei	—N/a	S-Shark	Resigned	Daisuke Gōri Katsuhisa Hōki	Daniel Baugh	TBD
Marshall D. Teach (Blackbeard)	Dark-Dark	—N/a	Resigned	Akio Ōtsuka	Cole Brown Chris Rager	TBD
Buggy	Chop-Chop	—N/a	Stripped after Reverie	Shigeru Chiba	David Wills Mike McFarland	Jeff Ward
Trafalgar Law	Op-Op	—N/a	Stripped for criminal activity	Hiroshi Kamiya	Matthew Mercer	TBD
Edward Weevil	—N/a	—N/a	Stripped after Reverie	Kōzō Shioya	Brook Chalmers	TBD

The Seven Warlords of the Sea (七武海, Shichibukai) were a group of pirates based on the privateers, who serve World Government interests by fighting other pirates, until the group was abolished by decision of the Reverie members.

The former Warlords of the Sea and their crews are listed below in rough chronological order of their initial joining:

=== Kuja Pirates ===
Kuja Pirates
Era	Leader	Key crew	
Era	Leader	Name	Title
until ~44 years before current time (BCT)	Gloriosa	Shakuyaku	First mate
~44 to 42 years BCT	Shakuyaku (Shakky)	?	
42 to 13 years BCT	Tritoma	?	
13 years BCT – present	Boa Hancock	Boa Sandersonia	
13 years BCT – present	Boa Hancock	Boa Marigold	

The Kuja Pirates (九蛇海賊団, Kuja Kaizokudan) are a crew formed by members of the Kuja Tribe, and captained by their empress, Boa Hancock. They are a crew formed by the strongest fighters of the Kuja, including Hancok's two younger sisters who possess the Zoan-type abilities of the Snake-Snake Fruit (ヘビヘビの実, Hebi Hebi no Mi) branch.^{[ch. 519]}

The Boa sisters are known as the "Gorgon Sisters", being based on the three Gorgons of the Greek mythology, while the members of the crew are based on the Amazons.

==== Boa Hancock ====
Boa Hancock (ボア・ハンコック, Boa Hankokku) is a member of the all-female Kuja Tribe from the island of Amazon Lily.^{[ch. 515f.]} Sold to the Celestial Dragons during childhood, she and her sisters are force-fed devil fruits and branded as slaves.^{[ch. 521]} Eventually freed by Fisher Tiger, the three return to their people. Hancock becomes ruler and is referred to by her subjects as "Snake Princess" (蛇姫, Hebihime).^{[ch. 516, 521]} Leading the Kuja Pirates, she quickly gains infamy as the "Pirate Empress" (海賊女帝, Kaizoku Jotei) and is offered membership in the Seven Warlords of the Sea.^{[ch. 516, 522]} Despite resenting the World Government for her past enslavement, which she keeps a secret even from her kinswomen, Hancock accepts the position to protect her people. But when called upon to participate in the Government's war against the Whitebeard Pirates, she initially refuses and only reconsiders after falling in love with Luffy, who enlists her help to infiltrate Impel Down.^{[ch. 516f., 520–522]}

The ability of the Paramecia-type Love-Love Fruit (メロメロの実, Mero Mero no Mi) allows her to turn anyone charmed by her into stone and back again, with the sole exception of Luffy due to his lack of any sexual interest in her.^{[ch. 516, 521]} Her fruit's abilities can also be countered by forcing yourself to feel another emotion that drowns out your lust, for example pain, as shown when Vice Admiral Momonga avoided being turned to stone by stabbing himself in the hand. She is also capable of utilizing all three types of Haki.

After the most recent Reverie, the Seven Warlords were disbanded, making her an enemy of the World Government again.

In the Japanese anime television series, her voice actress is Kotono Mitsuishi. In the Funimation English adaptation, her voice is supplied by Lydia Mackay.

Her abilities are based on those of the Gorgon Medusa in Greek mythology.

===== Salome =====
Salome (サロメ, Sarome) is Boa Hancock's pet snake who supports her in battle, and also acts as her throne that she sits on. He is white with patches of red. He wears a skull upon his head.

==== Boa Sandersonia ====
Boa Sandersonia (ボア・サンダーソニア, Boa Sandāsonia) is the middle sister whose Snake-Snake Fruit: Model Anaconda (ヘビヘビの実 モデル アナコンダ, Hebi Hebi no Mi: Moderu Anakonda) enables her to transform into an anaconda or anaconda-human hybrid.

Boa Sandersonia is voiced by Chiwa Saitō in the original Japanese version and by Lindsay Seidel in the Funimation dub.

==== Boa Marigold ====
Boa Marigold (ボア・マリーゴールド, Boa Marīgōrudo) is the youngest sister whose Snake-Snake Fruit: Model King Cobra (ヘビヘビの実 モデル キングコブラ, Hebi Hebi no Mi: Moderu Kingu Kobura) enables her to turn into a king cobra or king cobra-human hybrid.

Boa Marigold is voiced by Kimiko Saitō in the original Japanese version and by Julie Mayfield in the Funimation dub.

==== Shakky ====
Shakuyaku (シャクヤク), most commonly known by her nickname "Shakky", was the Empress and captain of the Kuja Pirates after Gloriosa. Her extreme popularity in comparison to Gloriosa led to her eventually taking over the post, but nevertheless retires to open a bar on Fullalead.^{[ch. 1156,1158]} Her kidnapping by the World Government led to the God Valley Incident.^{[ch. 1159]} Both the Rocks Pirates and the Roger Pirates arrived where they each wanted to rescue her.^{[ch. 1160]} After the Roger Pirates disband, she marries Silvers Rayleigh and works as a bartender at Sabaody Archipelago. Shakuyaku is voiced by Hiromi Tsuru in the original Japanese version, Masumi Asano in Episode 870 of the original Japanese version, and by Elizabeth Maxwell in the Funimation dub.

==== Gloriosa ====
Gloriosa (グロリオーサ, Guroriōsa), more commonly referred to as "Elder Nyon", is a short elderly woman who was the Empress of Amazon Lily and the captain of the Kuja Pirates approximately 60 years before current events. She also was a member of the Rocks Pirates. She fell in love with Gol D. Roger, only to leave behind her post and subsequently the country after his rejection in favor of Shakuyaku.^{[ch. 1156]} Gloriosa is voiced by Ako Mayama in the original Japanese version and by Nancy Sherrand in the Funimation dub.

==== Other Kuja pirates ====
- Marguerite (マーガレット, Māgaretto): A warrior who befriends Luffy. Marguerite is voiced by Masumi Asano in the original Japanese version and by Whitney Rodgers in the Funimation dub.
- Sweetpea (スイトピー, Suitopī): Marguerite's friend. Sweetpea is voiced by Kujira in the original Japanese version and by Doug Goodrich in the Funimation dub.
- Aphelandra (アフェランドラ, Aferandora): Marguerite's friend. Aphelandra is voiced by Akemi Okamura in the original Japanese version and by Sarah Wiedenheft in the Funimation dub.
- Tritoma (トリトマ, Toritoma): The Empress of Amazon Lily after Shakky and before Boa Hancock.

=== Thriller Bark Pirates ===
Thriller Bark Pirates
Mysterious Four	Gecko Moria (Shadow-Shadow)				
Mysterious Four	"Ghost Princess" Perona	"Graveyard" Absalom		Doctor Hogback	
Abilities	(Hollow-Hollow)	(Clear-Clear)		Dark medical arts	
Zombie groups	Wild	Surprise	Soldier	General	Special
Numbering	000–199	200–399	400–799	800–899	900
Key zombies	Kumacy; Lola; Risky Bros; Penguin Trio	Buhichuck; Rug Bear	Victoria Cindry	Ryuma; Jigoro; Taralan	Oars

The crew of the island-sized ship Thriller Bark (スリラーバーク, Surirā Bāku), captained by Gecko Moria, consists mostly of zombies, numbering in the hundreds, created from corpses.

==== Gecko Moria ====
Gecko Moria (ゲッコー・モリア, Gekkō Moria; a play on kōmori (蝙蝠)) is the captain of the island-sized ship Thriller Bark, leader of Thriller Bark's Mysterious Four, and a former member of the Seven Warlords of the Sea.^{[ch. 448]} The Shadow-Shadow Fruit (カゲカゲの実, Kage Kage no Mi) grants him the ability to control his shadow, allowing it to act completely independent from his body, and to control others' shadows.^{[ch. 455, 463]} After his entire crew that made up the Gecko Pirates is annihilated by Kaido, he creates a completely obedient, immortal army of zombies by implanting stolen shadows into corpses.^{[ch. 457, 481]}

Gecko fought Luffy again at Marineford, where he unleashed some Marine zombies on him.^{[ch. 558]} He was struck down by Jimbei.^{[ch. 559]}

After the Summit War of Marineford, Gecko's Warlord title is revoked.^{[ch. 581]} He escapes into the New World region before Donquixote Doflamingo and the Pacifistas can kill him.^{[ch. 595]}

Two years later, Gecko Moria later attacked the Blackbeard Pirates on Hachinosu while looking for Absalom.^{[ch. 925]} He was defeated and imprisoned by Blackbeard when he wouldn't side with him as Catarina Devon revealed that they killed Absalom.^{[ch. 1080]} He was later freed by Perona.^{[ch. 1126]}

In the Japanese anime television series, Gecko is voiced by Katsuhisa Hōki. In the Funimation dub, he is voiced by Chris Guerrero.

==== Perona ====
Perona (ペローナ, Perōna), also known as "Ghost Princess" (ゴーストプリンセス, Gōsuto Purinsesu), is a member of the Thriller Bark Pirates and member of Thriller Bark's Mysterious Four. She is a woman dressed in a Gothic Lolita-style who can create ghosts with various abilities thanks to the power of the Paramecia-type Hollow-Hollow Fruit (ホロホロの実, Horo Horo no Mi).^{[ch. 443, 461]}

After Gecko Moria's defeat, Perona takes shelter in Dracule Mihawk's castle, where she begrudgingly helps and cooperates with Roronoa Zoro in his training during the timeskip.^{[ch. 597]} Perona later separates from Mihawk and travels to Hachinosu after finding out that Gecko is still alive.^{[ch. 1080]}

In the original Japanese anime series, Perona is voiced by Kumiko Nishihara. In the Funimation English adaptation, her voice actress is Felecia Angelle.

==== Hogback ====
Hogback (ホグバック, Hogubakku) was a world-famous doctor and is Moria's medical servant and member of Thriller Bark's Mysterious Four, who was given unlife in the form of shadows stolen using Moria's Devil Fruit ability.^{[ch. 446, 449, 455]}

Hogback is voiced by Hiroshi Iwasaki in the original Japanese version and by Marcus D. Stimac in the Funimation dub.

==== Absalom ====
"Graveyard" Absalom (アブサロム, Abusaromu) is a patchwork man and member of Thriller Bark's Mysterious Four augmented by Hogback with the snout of a lion, the skin of an elephant, and the muscles of a bear and a gorilla. He can turn himself and anything he touches invisible thanks to the Clear-Clear Fruit. Absalom later became a freelance writer and leaked information about an alliance between the Hawkins Pirates, the Kid Pirates, and the On Air Pirates.^{[ch. 700]} Absalom is captured by the Blackbeard Pirates, brought to Hachinosu, and killed by Shiryu, who steals his Devil Fruit power.^{[ch. 925]}

Absalom is voiced by Hiroaki Miura in the original Japanese version and by Andrew Chandler in the Funimation dub.

==== Wild Zombies ====
Wild Zombies (動物ゾンビ, Wairudo Zonbi) are zombies commanded by Perona. Zombies who are numbered 0 to 199 are classified as Wild Zombies.

- Kumacy (クマシー, Kumash): A teddy bear-like Wild Zombie and servant of Perona who is the commander-in-chief of the Wild Zombies Kumacy. is voiced by Hiroshi Iwasaki in the original Japanese version and by Ray Hurd in the Funimation dub.
- Hildon (ヒルドン, Hirudon): A vampire-like Wild Zombie who serves as a messenger to Thriller Bark's Mysterious Four. Hildron is voiced by Taiki Matsuno in the original Japanese version and by Jerry Jewell in the Funimation dub.
- Lola (ローラ, Rōra): A warthog-like Wild Zombie who relentlessly pursues Absalom as her romantic interest. She once had the shadow of Charlotte Lola. Lola is voiced by Aya Hisakawa in the original Japanese version and by Alex Moore in the Funimation dub.
- The Hippo Gentleman (カバ紳士, Kaba Shinshi): A Wild Zombie who resembles a large hunchbacked gentleman with a hippopotamus head and is the vice-commander of the Wild Zombies. The Hippo Gentleman is voiced by Eiji Takemoto in the original Japanese version and by JB Holub in the Funimation dub.
- Cerberus (ケルベロス, Keruberosu): A Wild Zombie who resembles the body parts of two blue dogs and a three-tailed fox stitched together; two of the heads are blue dogs and the other head is a three-tailed fox. The Cerberus is voiced by Takahiro Fujimoto in the original Japanese version. In the English dub, vocal effects for the Cerberus' fox head was provided by Anthony Bowling
- The Carriage Drivers (馬車の運転手, Basha no untenshu): Two Wild Zombies who pulled the carriage that carried Nami, Usopp, and Tony Tony Chopper. One Carriage Driver is a skull-headed centaur, the other is a large dog, and the third is a hunchback-like creature in a hooded robe who rides the dog. The skull-headed centaur is voiced by Yoshihiro Kanemitsu in the original Japanese version. The hooded robed hunchback is voiced by Hirofumi Tanaka in the original Japanese version.
- Unigaro (ユニガロ, Yunigaro): A Wild Zombie who resembles a unicorn. Unigaro is voiced by Hiroshi Okamoto in the original Japanese version and by Aaron Dismuke in the Funimation dub.
- The Human-Faced Trees (人間の顔をした木, Ningen no kao o shita ki): Wild Zombies who resemble trees with human faces and limbs.
  - MocDonald (モクドナルド, Mokudonarudo): A Human-Faced Tree. MocDonald is voiced by Eiji Takemoto in the original Japanese version and by Aaron Roberts in the Funimation dub
- Lion-Cow (ライオン牛, Raion ushi): A Wild Zombie who resembles a lion with the hindquarters of a cattle.
- The Manticore (マンティコア, Mantikoa): A Wild Zombie who resembles a lion with a man's face.
- The Giant Earthworm (巨大ミミズ, Kyodai mimizu) is a Wild Zombie who resembles a gigantic earthworm.
- The Cheshire Cat (チェシャ猫, Chesha Neko): A Wild Zombie who resembles a cat.
- The Risky Brothers (リスキー兄弟, Risukī Kyōdai): A duo of Wild Zombies who resemble squirrels. They were animated by the shadows of the actual Risky Brothers. The Risky Brothers are voiced by Yūsuke Numata and Tamotsu Nishiwaki in the original Japanese version and by Brandon Jerome Bristowe and Ian Moore in the Funimation dub.
- The Penguin Zombie Duo (ペンギンゾンビコンビ, Pengin Zonbi Konbi): A duo of Wild Zombies who resemble penguins. The Penguin Zombie Duo was later made into the Penguin Zombie Trio (ペンギンゾンビトリオ, Pengin Zonbi Torio) when Inuppe was added to the group. The bowtie penguin is voiced by Yuta Kasuya in the original Japanese version. The top hat penguin is voiced by Takehiro Fujimoto in the original Japanese version.
  - Inuppe (犬ッペ): A Wild Zombie and member of the Penguin Zombie Trio who resembles a penguin with the snout and ears of a bulldog. Inuppe is voiced by Hiroaki Hirata in the original Japanese version and by Eric Vale in the Funimation dub.
- Zebra Kangaroo (シマウマカンガルー, Shimaumakangarū): A Wild Zombie who resembles a kangaroo with zebra fur and boxing gloves.
- The Spider Mice (スパイダーマウス, Supaidā Mausu): Wild Zombies working for Taralan who resemble mice with spider legs. There are 500 Spider Mice in total.

==== Surprise Zombies ====
The Surprise Zombies (びっくりゾンビ, Bikkuri Zonbi) resemble items who are scattered throughout Thriller Bark and resemble stitched-up pieces of cloth and skin. Zombies who have been numbered 200 to 399 are Surprise Zombies.

- Buhichuck (ブヒチャック, Buhichakku): A Surprise Zombie that resembles a pig protruding through a hunting trophy frame. He is the leader of the Surprise Zombies. Buhichuck is voiced by Keiji Hirai in the original Japanese version and by Matt Thurston in the Funimation dub.
- The Rug Bear (敷きグマ, Shikiguma): A Surprise Zombie who resembles a white bear-skin rug. Rug Bear is voiced by Eiji Takemoto in the original Japanese version.
- The Jack-in-the-Box (びっくり箱, Bikkuri Bako): A Surprise Zombie who resembles a clown in a box. The Jack-in-the-Box is voiced by Eiji Takemoto in the original Japanese version.
- The Wall Zombie (壁ゾンビ, Kabe Zonbi): A Surprise Zombie that resembles a wall with a human-like face and arms.

==== Soldier Zombies ====
The Soldier Zombies (兵士ゾンビ, Sorujā Zonbi) are the basic zombie soldiers who are commanded by Absalom. Zombies that have been numbered 400 to 799 are Soldier Zombies.

- Victoria Cindry (ビクトリア・シンドリー, Bikutoria Shindorī): A former famous stage actress-turned-Soldier Zombie who has a strong hatred for plates and whom Dr. Hogback was in love with. Cindry is voiced by Naomi Shindō while alive and Houko Kuwashima as a zombie in the original Japanese version. In the Funimation dub, she is voiced by Jamie Marchi.
- Gyoro (ギョロ), Nin (ニン), and Bao (バオ): Three oddly-shaped Soldier Zombies that are first seen informing Gecko Moria about the Straw Hat Crew's arrival. Gyoro looks like a one-eyed oval-headed samurai, Nin is a pinkish-red archer, and Bao is a bucket-wearing superhero. Gyoro is voiced by Kimiko Saitō in the original Japanese version and by Trina Nishimura in the Funimation dub. Nin is voiced by Eiji Takemoto in the original Japanese version and by Mariela Ortiz in the Funimation dub. Bao is voiced by Yuuta Kasuya in the original Japanese version and by Ryan Reynolds in the Funimation dub.
- Tailor Zombie (テーラーゾンビ, Tērāzonbi): A Soldier Zombie and tailor. The Tailor Zombie is voiced by Keiichi Sonobe in the original Japanese version.
- Pastor Zombie (ゾンビ牧師, Zonbi Bokushi): A Soldier Zombie and pastor. The Pastor Zombie is voiced by Eiji Takemoto in the original Japanese version.

==== General Zombies ====
The General Zombies (将軍ゾンビ, Jeneraru Zonbi) are specialized zombies made from renowned warriors who are commanded by Absalom. Zombies that have been numbered 800 to 899 are General Zombies.

- Shimotsuki Ryuma (霜月リューマ, Shimotsuki Ryūma): A samurai from Wano Country's "Country of Gold" era whose body was later stolen from his grave and made into one of Gecko Moria's General Zombies. He once had the shadow of Brook. Before One Piece, the character appeared previously in the one-shot manga Monsters. Shimotsuki Ryuma is voiced by Yoshimasa Hosoya when alive and Chō as a zombie in the original Japanese version. In the English dub, he is voiced by Ian Sinclair in the Funimation dub of the anime, while Robbie Daymond voices him in the Monsters ONA.
- Captain John: The zombie of a pirate captain and former Rocks Pirates member.
- Ganzui: The zombie of a Rocks Pirates member.
- Gill Bastar: The zombie of a Rocks Pirates member.
- Jigoro (ジゴロウ): A General Zombie swordsman. Jigoro is voiced by Kazuya Nakai in the original Japanese version and by Christopher Sabat in the Funimation dub.
- Taralan (タララン, Tararan): A large monkey/spider General Zombie who is the commander of the Spider Mice. Taralan is voiced by Kazunari Tanaka in the original Japanese version. In the Funimation dub, he is voiced by Todd Upchurch from Episode 346 to Episode 406 and by Jim Foronda in later episodes.

==== Special Zombie Oars ====
The Special Zombie (特別ゾンビ, Supesharu Zonbi) is a zombie that is stronger than even a General Zombie and has SZ-900 on his left arm. The only Special Zombie in the story is Oars (オーズ, Ōzu), a 219 ft. Ancient Giant formerly feared by all who was reanimated as a Special Zombie by Moria using Luffy's shadow. Oars is voiced by Mayumi Tanaka in the original Japanese version and by Colleen Clinkenbeard in the Funimation dub.

=== Sun Pirates ===
The Sun Pirates' Jolly Roger, an alteration of the Hoof of the Soaring Dragon.

The Sun Pirates (タイヨウの海賊団, Taiyō no Kaizokudan) are a band of pirates consisting of fish-men and mermen that was originally led by Fisher Tiger and later by Jimbei. They attack any pirate ship they see, but no matter who is on it, they never kill directly.^{[ch. 622]} Their Sun insignia was created to cover up the mark of the Celestial Dragon's slave, "Hoof of the Soaring Dragon", since many on the crew bore the mark from being enslaved. The Sun insignia was designed to completely cover the Hoof branding, so the World Government was unable to know which crew member to kidnap and re-enslave due confusion over their former status.^{[ch. 620]} The members of the Arlong Pirates and Macro Pirates were also members of the crew.^{[ch. 622]}

The Sun Pirates temporarily shelter a human child, Koala, who escaped from Marijoa during Tiger's liberation,^{[ch. 622]} and eventually return her to her parents on Foolshout Island, where a Marine ambush led by Rear Admiral Strawberry results in Tiger's death.^{[ch. 623]} With Arlong imprisoned, Jimbei took over the Sun Pirates until he joined the Seven Warlords of the Sea; as part of Jimbei's conditions for accepting the role, which he believes will bring Queen Otohime's dream closer to reality, Arlong is released, but he and the rest of the Arlong Pirates leave the crew, as well as the members of the Macro Pirates.^{[ch. 624]}

The Sun Pirates later served under Big Mom as her subordinates, until Jinbe decided to abandon their alliance with her. They helped the Straw Hats escape from Big Mom's territory.

The current known members of the Sun Pirates are:

- Aladine (アラディン, Aradin): A goatsbeard brotula-type merman who is the crew's doctor and first mate during Jimbei's leadership. Aladine was once enslaved and is now married to Charlotte Praline. Aladine is voiced by Takashi Nagasako in the original Japanese version and by Brad Smeaton in the Funimation dub.
- Charlotte Praline (シャーロット・プラリネ, Shārotto Purarine): Aladine's wife and Big Mom's 21st daughter who is a hybrid of a human and a hammerhead shark-type merman. She is the younger twin sister of Charlotte Prim. Charlotte Praline is voiced by Yuko Tachibana in the original Japanese version and by Sara Ragsdale in the Funimation dub.
- Wadatsumi (ワダツミ): A giant tiger blowfish-type fish-man who is a former member of the Flying Pirates. Wadatsumi is voiced by Kōki Miyata in the original Japanese version and by Trina Nishimura in the Funimation dub.

=== Donquixote Family ===
Donquixote Family
Donquixote Doflamingo (String-String)
Elite Officers	Trébol	Diamante	Pica	Vergo
Elite Officers	Clubs ♣	Diamond ♦	Spade ♠	Heart ♥
Elite Officers	(Stick-Stick)	(Ripple-Ripple)	(Stone-Stone)	—N/a
Specialities	Specialists	Fighters	Commandos	—N/a
Army Officers	Sugar (Hobby‑Hobby); Giolla (Art-Art); Viola (Glare‑Glare)	Lao G; Machvise (Ton‑Ton); Senor Pink (Swim‑Swim); Dellinger	Buffalo (Spin‑Spin); Gladius (Pop‑Pop); Baby 5 (Arms‑Arms)	—N/a
Other Officers	Monet		Donquixote Rosinante (Corazon)	
Other Officers	(Snow-Snow)		(Calm-Calm)	

The Donquixote Family (ドンキホーテファミリー, Donkihōte Famirī), also called the Donquixote Pirates (ドンキホーテ海賊団, Donkihōte Kaizoku-dan), are a powerful crew led by Donquixote Doflamingo.^{[ch. 762]} The figurative family is split into three divisions, each led by one of the top three officers: the Trébol Army, Diamante Army and Pica Army.^{[ch. 732]} Bellamy and Kyuin were members of the crew, and Caesar Clown and Disco were also their subordinates.

==== Donquixote Doflamingo ====
Donquixote Doflamingo (ドンキホーテ・ドフラミンゴ, Donkihōte Dofuramingo) is the captain of the Donquixote Pirates, the usurper king of the island Dressrosa, and formerly one of the Seven Warlords of the Sea.^{[ch. 234, 682, 728]} The String-String Fruit (イトイトの実, Ito Ito no Mi) grants him the ability to control others using movements with his fingers resembling a puppeteer's. It also enables him to control sharp thin strings from his fingertips that can cut people, create clones of himself, and attach to the clouds in the sky to allow him to fly.^{[ch. 231]} He is also capable of utilizing all three types of Haki. He is also a former Celestial Dragon after his father, Donquixote Homing, decided to abandon that life to become a normal human. However, they were chased by the people, tortured, and eventually Doflamingo killed his father. He brought the head of his father back to Mariejois in hopes of receiving his Celestial title back again. He was denied and later became a pirate.

He believes that the "Great Pirate Era" is nearing its end and a new age is about to begin.^{[ch. 303]} He is a broker under the alias of "Joker", and owns a large auction house at the Sabaody Archipelago, where humans and other species are sold as slaves.^{[ch. 504]} Eventually after the Straw Hat Crew and Dressrosa's citizens reveal his treacherous deeds, Doflamingo is defeated by Luffy and his title is revoked leading to the arrest of him and his pirate crew.

He is voiced by Hideyuki Tanaka. In the Funimation English adaptation, his voice is supplied by Robert McCollum.

==== Elite Officers ====
- Trébol (トレーボル, Torēboru): The leader of the Trébol Army, occupying the Club seat of Donquixote Pirates, with the powers of the Stick-Stick Fruit (ベタベタの実, Beta Beta no Mi) which allows him to generate an adhesive and highly sticky liquid. Trébol is voiced by Taiki Matsuno in the original Japanese version and by Alejandro Saab in the Funimation dub.
- Diamante (ディアマンテ): The leader of the Diamante Army, occupying the Diamond seat of Donquixote Pirates, who has the powers of the Ripple-Ripple Fruit (ヒラヒラの実, Hira Hira no Mi) which allows him to flatten, reform, and fold anything while still retaining its original characteristics. Diamante is voiced by Hideyuki Umezu in the original Japanese version and by Brad Hawkins in the Funimation dub.
- Pica (ピーカ, Pīka): The leader of the Pica Army, occupying the Spade seat of Donquixote Pirates, and a large, muscular man with a comically high voice with the powers of the Stone-Stone Fruit (イシイシの実, Ishi Ishi no Mi), which allows him to absorb, manipulate, and merge with stone. Pica is voiced by Yūji Mitsuya in the original Japanese version and by Ry McKeand in the Funimation dub.
- Vergo (ヴェルゴ, Berugo): A tall, light-skinned, lean, yet muscular man who is an elite officer of the Donquixote Pirates, formerly occupying the Heart seat and went by the code name "Corazon" before Rosinante, undercover as a Naval vice admiral heading G-5 in Punk Hazard. He is a practitioner of Rokushiki and is also proficient in the use of Armament Haki. After being defeated by Law, he dies when the SAD Production Room explodes he was in. Vergo is voiced by Junichi Suwabe in the original Japanese version and by Wes Frazierin the Funimation dub.

==== Donquixote Pirates' Officers ====
- Trébol Army (トレーボル軍, Torēboru-gun) is a division of the Donquixote Pirates led by Trébol specializing in missions that require users with special powers.^{[ch. 732]} Its officers consists of:
  - Sugar (シュガー, Shugā): A girl ranked as a "special officer" of the Trébol Army with the powers of the Hobby-Hobby Fruit (ホビホビの実, Hobi Hobi no Mi), which allows her to turn people into toys. Her fruit also makes her retain the appearance of a little girl, without aging. Sugar is voiced by Rie Kugimiya in the original Japanese version and by Natalie Hoover in the Funimation.
  - Giolla (ジョーラ, Jōra): A woman with the powers of the Art-Art Fruit (アトアトの実, Ato Ato no Mi) which allows her to transform things into modern art. Giolla is voiced by Hiroko Emori in the original Japanese version and by CJ Critt in the Funimation dub.
  - Viola, under the code name Violet (ヴィオラ, Baioretto), was also part of the Trébol Army.
- Diamante Army (ディアマンテ軍, Diamante-gun): A division of the Donquixote Pirates led by Diamante specializing in fighting missions.^{[ch. 732]} Its officers consists of:
  - Lao G (ラオ・G, Rao Jī): An old skilled martial artist obsessed with the letter G. Lao G is voiced by Tetsuo Gotō in the original Japanese version and by Jim White in the Funimation dub.
  - Machvise (マッハバイス, Mahhabaisu): A strong man with the powers of the Ton-Ton Fruit (トントンの実, Ton Ton no Mi) which allows him to change his weight at will. Machvise is voiced by Naomi Kusumi in the original Japanese version and by Shawn Gann in the Funimation dub.
  - Senor Pink (セニョール・ピンク, Senyōru Pinku): A "hard boiled" man with the power of the Swim-Swim Fruit (スイスイの実, Sui Sui no Mi) which allows him to swim through the ground or walls. Senor Pink is voiced by Kazuhiro Yamaji in the original Japanese version and by Ethan Gallardo in the Funimation dub.
  - Dellinger (デリンジャー, Derinjā): A boy who is a hybrid of a human and a Siamese fighting fish-type fishman. He primarily fights with kicks. Dellinger is voiced by Kōki Miyata in the original Japanese version and by Brandon McInnes in the Funimation dub.
- Pica Army (ピーカ軍, Pīka-gun) is a division of the Donquixote Pirates led by Pica specializing in commando missions.^{[ch. 732]} Its officers consists of:
  - Buffalo (バッファロー, Baffarō): An extremely large man with the powers of the Spin-Spin Fruit (グルグルの実, Guru Guru no Mi) which allows him to rotate any part of his body like a propeller. Buffalo is voiced by Yasuhiro Takato in the original Japanese version and by Travis Mullenix in the Funimation dub.
  - Gladius (グラディウス, Guradiusu): A man with the powers of the Pop-Pop Fruit (パムパムの実, Pamu Pamu no Mi) which allows him to make his own body or any inorganic object he touches rupture and explode. Gladius is voiced by Isshin Chiba in the original Japanese version and by Taylor Harris in the Funimation dub.
  - Baby 5 was also part of the Pica Army.
- Monet (モネ, Mone): A harpy-like woman, officer of the Donquixote Pirates,^{[ch. 732]} and Caesar Clown's lab assistant with the ability to generate, control, or transform into snow thanks to the powers of the Snow-Snow Fruit. Her bird parts were the replacements for her original parts. Monet was killed when Caesar accidentally stabbed her removed heart instead of Smoker's removed heart. Monet is voiced by Naoko Matsui in the original Japanese version and by Janelle Lutz in the Funimation dub.

=== Hanafuda ===
"King of Lizards" Hanafuda (ハナフダ) was a former Warlord of the Sea. He is the father of Ulti and Page One and entrusted them to Kaido after agreeing to serve the Animal Kingdom Pirates. He used to collect Ancient Zoan Devil Fruits. After he was defeated by Portgas D. Ace, Hanafuda was stripped of his title and replaced by Bartholomew Kuma. He was later killed by a rival pirate. Doflamingo replaced Hanafuda's relationship with the Animal Kingdom Pirates.^{[vol. 111:SBS]}

=== Bartholomew Kuma ===
The "Tyrant" (暴君, Bōkun) Bartholomew Kuma (バーソロミュー・くま, Bāsoromyū Kuma; kuma (熊) meaning bear), is one of the Seven Warlords of the Sea; the only one with a reputation for complete obedience to the World Government, when in fact he is an officer of the Revolutionary Army.^{[ch. 234, 473f., 603]} He was formerly a slave with Emporio Ivankov and Ginny, saving others at the God Valley incident before escaping. He later became the King of the Sorbet Kingdom, raising Jewelry Bonney, Ginny's daughter, from childhood.^{[ch. 1098]} The power of the Paramecia-type Paw-Paw Fruit (ニキュニキュの実, Nikyu Nikyu no Mi) allows his palms to repel anything, from physical objects such as people or air to abstracts such as pain and fatigue.^{[ch. 484f.]} He can use this ability to safely transport himself or others over long distances.^{[ch. 514]}

Kuma is the model for the Pacifista (パシフィスタ, Pashifisuta), a class of experimental cyborgs created by Dr. Vegapunk for the Government. Their bodies are made of a substance harder than steel, and they can shoot powerful blasts from their mouths that can melt metal.^{[ch. 485]} The other Pacifista look just like Kuma, sharing his towering, bear-like stature, but lack the Paw-Paw Fruit's ability. Instead, they are able to shoot laser beams based on Admiral Kizaru's Glint-Glint Fruit laser abilities from their palms.^{[ch. 508f.]} At some point during his gradual conversion into the human weapon "PX-0", Kuma's personality is erased, leaving him a programmable fighting machine under the Government's control until becoming a slave-to-rent for the World Nobles as punishment for aiding Luffy.^{[ch. 559f.]} However, parts of his personality gradually returned as he unexpectedly ran across the Grand Line to Egghead to save Bonney, enough to recognize her and attack Jaygarcia Saturn; he became a companion of the Straw Hat Crew on their escape, arriving on Elbaph with them.

In the original Japanese series, Bartholomew Kuma is voiced by Hideyuki Hori. Joel McDonald voices Kuma in the Funimation English adaptation.

The character is named after the real life pirate Bartholomew Roberts.

=== Edward Weevil ===
Edward Weevil (エドワード・ウィーブル, Edowādo Wīburu), also called "Whitebeard Jr." (白ひげ, Jr. Shirohige Junia), is the self-proclaimed son of Whitebeard and was one of the Seven Warlords of the Sea. He is not very intelligent, and thus constantly manipulated by his mother Buckingham Stussy. Influenced by his mother, Weevil believes that he is the rightful heir of Whitebeard's fortune, not the members of his father's crew, and to claim Whitebeard's treasure that Buckin promised him, he fought and destroyed fifteen pirate crews that served under Whitebeard.^{[ch. 802]}

Edward Weevil is voiced by Kōzō Shioya in the original Japanese version and by Brook Chalmers in the Funimation dub.

== Worst Generation ==
Worst Generation
Group		Role	Devil Fruit	From	Anime voice actor(s)	
Crew	Name	Role	Devil Fruit	From	JP	US
Blackbeard	Marshall D. Teach	Captain	Dark-Dark	Grand Line	Akio Ōtsuka	Cole Brown Chris Rager
Bonney	Jewelry Bonney	Captain	Age-Age	South Blue	Reiko Kiuchi; Reiko Takagi	Laura Wetsel
Drake	X. Drake	Captain	Dragon-Dragon (Allosaurus)	North Blue	Eiji Takemoto	D. C. Douglas
Fallen Monk	Urouge	Captain	unknown	[Sky Island]	Taiten Kusunoki	Major Attaway
Fire Tank	Capone Bege	Captain	Castle-Castle	West Blue	Naoki Tatsuta	Kyle Hebert
Hawkins	Basil Hawkins	Captain	Straw-Straw	North Blue	Shigenori Soya	Taliesin Jaffe
Heart	Trafalgar D. Water Law	Captain	Op-Op	North Blue	Hiroshi Kamiya	Matthew Mercer
Kid	Eustass Kid	Captain	Magnet-Magnet	South Blue	Daisuke Namikawa	Justin Cook
Kid	Killer	Combatant	SMILE	South Blue	Kenji Hamada	Leo Fabian
On-Air	Scratchmen Apoo	Captain	Tone-Tone	Grand Line	Mitsuaki Madono	Brad Venable Brent Mukai
Straw Hat	Monkey D. Luffy	Captain	Gum-Gum	East Blue	Mayumi Tanaka	Colleen Clinkenbeard
Straw Hat	Roronoa Zoro	Combatant	—N/a	East Blue	Kazuya Nakai	Christopher Sabat

Originally known as the "Eleven Supernovas" (11人の超新星, Jūichinin no Chōshinsei), it is a group of rookie pirates whose bounties exceed over 100,000,000 berries, having reached the Sabaody Archipelago simultaneously. The group's members are: Monkey D. Luffy and his crewmate Roronoa Zoro; Trafalgar Law; Capone Bege; X. Drake; Jewelry Bonney; Basil Hawkins; Eustass Kid and his crewmate Killer; Scratchmen Apoo; and Urouge.^{[ch. 498]} Regarded as "problem children", these pirates, along with Blackbeard, eventually became known as the "Worst Generation" (最悪の世代, Saiaku no Sedai) by the World Government as they gained more notoriety for their crimes and, sometimes, their willingness to challenge the status quo.^{[ch. 664]}

=== Basil Hawkins ===
Basil Hawkins (バジル・ホーキンス, Bajiru Hōkinsu), nicknamed "Magician" (魔術師, Majutsushi), is the captain of the Hawkins Pirates, originating from the North Blue. He ate the Straw-Straw Fruit (ワラワラの実, Wara Wara no Mi), a Paramecia-type Devil Fruit that allows him to create and manipulate straw. He can cover himself in straw and make scarecrow-like straw avatars to aid his offense. He also has a habit of reading tarot cards to find out what is going to happen and the percentage probability that what he predicts will happen.

After the two year timeskip, he tried to form an alliance with Scratchmen Apoo and Eustass Kid. After Kaido appeared in front of them, he ended up joining the Animal Kingdom Pirates as Kaido's subordinate, betraying Kid along with Apoo, and becoming one of the crew's Headliners. During the battle on Onigashima, he ended up facing Killer, ultimately being defeated by him.

Basil Hawkins is voiced by Shigenori Sōya in the original Japanese version and by Taliesin Jaffe in the Funimation dub.

The character is named after the real life buccaneer Basil Ringrose and the privateer John Hawkins.

=== Capone Bege ===
Capone "Gang" Bege (カポネ・“ギャング”・ベッジ, Kapone "Gyangu" Bejji) is a mafia don turned pirate. He has the power of the Castle-Castle Fruit (シロシロの実, Shiro Shiro no Mi), a Paramecia-type Devil Fruit that allows him to create and maintain a dimensional fortress inside his body, being able to put people inside after being reduced when approaching the entrances of his body, or transforming into a great castle that serves as a fortress.^{[ch. 812]}

During the two year time skip, Bege became one of the Big Mom Pirates' combatants until he formed an alliance with Luffy and Caesar Clown to finish off Big Mom. Bege is married to Charlotte Chiffon and they are both the parents of Capone Pez (カポネ・ペッツ, Kapone Pettsu).

Capone Bege is voiced by Naoki Tatsuta in the original Japanese version and by Kyle Hebert in the Funimation dub.

The character is named after the real life gangster Al Capone.

==== Fire Tank Pirates ====
The Fire Tank Pirates (ファイアタンク海賊団, Faia Tanku Kaizokudan) are Capone Bege's pirate crew, originating from the West Blue. Later on, they incorporate the Rolling Pirates into their crew.

- Vito (ヴィト): Nicknamed "Phantom Gun" (怪銃, Kaijū; lit. "Monster Gun"), is Bege's advisor.^{[ch. 813]} Vito is voiced by Daisuke Kishio in the original Japanese version and by Chris Hackney in the Funimation dub.
- Gotti (ゴッティ): Bege's combatant.^{[ch. 825]} He is married to Charlotte Lola of the Rolling Pirates.^{[ch. 993]} Gotti is voiced by Masafumi Kimura in the original Japanese version and by Joshua Passmore in the Funimation dub.
- Charlotte Chiffon (シャーロット・シフォン, Shārotto Shifon): Is Bege's wife, and they are both the parents of Capone Pez. She is Big Mom's 22nd daughter, as well as Pound's daughter, and Charlotte Lola's twin sister. Chiffon is voiced by Aya Hisakawa in the original Japanese version and by Kate Bristol in the Funimation dub.
- Charlotte Lola (シャーロット•ローラ, Shārotto Rōra): Captain of the Rolling Pirates. She and her crew were among the victims of Gecko Moria in Thriller Bark. She is the 23rd daughter of Big Mom and twin sister of Charlotte Chiffon. Lola ran away from Totto Land when her mother wanted her to marry Prince Loki of Elbaph, deciding to sail in the sea to find someone she truly loved. During her trip, she asked all the men she met if they wanted to marry her, eventually marrying Gotti in a merging of the Fire Tank Pirates and the Rolling Pirates.^{[ch. 993]} Lola is voiced by Aya Hisakawa in the original Japanese version and by Alex Moore in the Funimation dub.
- Risky Brothers (リスキー兄弟, Risukī Kyōdai): Two Rolling Pirates crew members who keep track of all the times their Lola has been rejected by the men. The tallest of the duo is voiced by Yūsuke Numata in the original Japanese version and by Brandon Jerome Bristowe in the Funimation dub, while the shortest of the duo is voiced by Tamotsu Nishiwaki in the original Japanese version and by Ian Moore in the Funimation dub.
- Pound (パウンド, Paundo): A 24 ft. human who is the 25th ex-husband of Big Mom and the father of Charlotte Chiffon and Charlotte Lola. After he was discarded by Big Mom, Pound worked to reunite with his daughters which led to his encounter with the Straw Hat Crew. Though he got burned rescuing Chiffon's group from Charlotte Oven,^{[ch. 887]} he was later found adrift by the Tontatta Pirates and was taken to Dressrosa to be healed.^{[ch. 979]} Pound later proved to Chiffon and Lola that he was their father when he saved their ship from an attack by a Marine ship.^{[ch. 989]} The Fire Tank Pirates pulled him aboard. Pound later attended the wedding of Lola and Gotti.^{[ch. 993]} Pound is voiced by Masami Kikuchi in the original Japanese version and by Patrick McAllister in the Funimation dub.

=== Jewelry Bonney ===
Jewelry Bonney (ジュエリー・ボニー, Juerī Bonī) is one of twelve pirates collectively known as the Worst Generation and the only female of the group. She is nicknamed "Glutton" (大喰らい, Ō-Gurai; lit. "Big Eater") because of her gigantic appetite which, however, does not affect her sinuous figure.^{[ch. 498]} She has eaten the Age-Age Fruit, which allows her to change her own age (which she uses to disguise herself) as well as others, making her opponents either too young or too old to fight her; despite her appearance, she is a 12-year-old child. She is the captain of the Bonney Pirates, mostly consisting of fishermen acquainted with her.^{[ch. 499]} Born to Revolutionary Ginny and a World Noble, she was raised by Bartholomew Kuma from childhood, making her princess of the Sorbet Kingdom during Kuma's reign.^{[ch. 1100]}

After the Paramount War, she and her crew were defeated and captured by the Blackbeard Pirates, and she was subsequently arrested by the Marine fleet led by Sakazuki. Somehow, she managed to escape, showing herself wandering the streets incognito after the two year timeskip. During the World Meeting, she infiltrated Marijoa to rescue Kuma, eventually catching up to the Straw Hats at Egghead for similar matters.

Jewelry Bonney is voiced by Reiko Kiuchi and later by Reiko Takagi in the original Japanese version. In the Funimation dub, she is voiced by Laura Wetsel.

The character is named after the real life pirate Anne Bonney.

=== Kid Pirates ===
==== Eustass Kid ====
Eustass "Captain" Kid (ユースタス・キャプテン・キッド, Yūsutasu "Kyaputen" Kiddo) is the captain of the Kid Pirates, originating from the South Blue. Among his crew is his childhood friend Killer. Kid ate the Magnet-Magnet Fruit (ジキジキの実, Jiki Jiki no Mi), a Paramecia-type Devil Fruit that allows him to attract and control metal objects with magnetism.^{[vol. 99:SBS]} He is also capable of utilizing all three types of Haki. During the time skip, he lost his arm after an encounter with Shanks, depending on a metal pieces arm created by his ability. After trying to form an alliance with Scratchmen Apoo and Basil Hawkins, he ended up being betrayed by them and captured by Kaido, having to later ally himself with Luffy and Law in their plan to defeat him. After the events at Wano, Kid's whereabouts are currently unknown after another failed attempt to assault Shanks.

Eustass Kid is voiced by Daisuke Namikawa in the original Japanese version and by Justin Cook in the Funimation dub.

Both his name and epithet are based in the real life privateer William "Captain" Kidd.

==== Killer ====
Killer (キラー, Kirā), nicknamed "Murder Machine" (殺戮武人, Satsuriku Bujin; lit. "Massacre Soldier") is the combatant of the Kid Pirates and Eustass Kid's childhood friend. He usually fights using two blades, and stands out for wearing a mask on his face.

After he and Kid were captured by Kaido, Killer was forced to eat a dud SMILE fruit, leaving him permanently smiling. In Wano, he ended up working for Kaido's ally Kurozumi Orochi as a street assassin known as Kamazo the Manslayer (人斬り鎌ぞう, Hito Kiri Kamazō). To get revenge on Kaido, he and the Kid Pirates ended up joining Luffy and Law's alliance.

Killer is voiced by Kenji Hamada in the original Japanese version and by Leo Fabian in the Funimation dub.

=== Scratchmen Apoo ===
Scratchmen Apoo (スクラッチメン・アプー, Sukuratchimen Apū), also known as "Roar of the Sea" (海鳴り, Umi Nari), is the captain of the On-Air Pirates (オンエア海賊団, On Ea Kaizokudan), and a member of the longarm tribe. He has the power of the Tone-Tone Fruit (オトオトの実, Oto Oto no Mi), a Paramecia-type Devil Fruit that gives him the ability to transform parts of his body into various instruments and generate music and great vibrations with them, however, sound does not affect people if they do not hear it.

After the two year timeskip, he tried to form an alliance with Basil Hawkins and Eustass Kid. However, he was affiliated with Kaido to ambush them with Apoo being actually a subordinate of the Animal Kingdom Pirates as their informant, ending up with Hawkins joining Kaido and Apoo, and Kid being captured.

Scratchmen Apoo is voiced by Mitsuaki Madono in the original Japanese version. In the Funimation dub, he is voiced by Brad Venable in episodes 392-629 and One Piece: Stampede and by Brent Mukai starting in Episode 736.

The character is named after the real life pirate Chui A-poo.

=== Trafalgar Law ===
The "Surgeon of Death" (死の外科医, Shi no Gekai), Trafalgar D. Water Law (トラファルガー・D・ワーテル・ロー, Torafarugā Dī Wāteru Rō), originates from the North Blue.^{[ch. 498, 508, 578, 763]} Having eaten the Paramecia-type Op-Op Fruit (オペオペの実, Ope Ope no Mi), Law can, after generating a blue spherical area around himself, cut and teleport objects as well as perform body swaps within said blue area.^{[ch. 661]} He is the captain of the Heart Pirates. Originally from the White Town, Flevance, he escaped with White Lead Disease and became a member of the Donquixote Pirates. There he met Donquixote Rosinante, the brother of Doflamingo, and together they went on an adventure to find a cure for Law. Ultimately they found the Devil Fruit, but before they escaped, Rosinante was killed by Doflamingo, leaving Law to seek out revenge. Law makes a name for himself and following the Paramount War, Law joins the Seven Warlords of the Sea.^{[ch. 659, 673]} Though he enters into an alliance with Luffy and the Straw Hats to take down Kaido, one of the Four Emperors, Law is actually hunting down Donquixote Doflamingo. Law's whereabouts are unknown after a devastating defeat against the Blackbeard Pirates, though he survived due to crew member and polar bear Bepo's interference.

Trafalgar Law is voiced by Hiroshi Kamiya in the original Japanese version and by Matthew Mercer in the Funimation dub.

The character's name takes inspiration after the real life pirate Edward Low, as well as from the historical battles of Trafalgar and Waterloo.

==== Heart Pirates ====
The Heart Pirates (ハートの海賊団, Hāto no Kaizokudan) is the pirate crew led by Trafalgar Law, consisting of twenty-one members, including:

- Bepo (ベポ): A polar bear-type mink and crew navigator. Bepo is voiced by Yasuhiro Takato in the original Japanese version and by Cris George in the Funimation dub.
- Shachi (シャチ): An average-size lean man who wears an orca-shaped hat. Shachi is voiced by Takahiro Fujimoto in the original Japanese version and by Ben Bryant in the Funimation dub.
- Penguin (ペンギン, Pengin): An average-size lean man who wears a hat with his name on it. Penguin is voiced by Keiji Hirai in the original Japanese version and by Seth Magill in the Funimation dub.
- Jean Bart (ジャンバール, Janbāru): A large man who was a former slave of Saint Rosward. Jean Bart is voiced by Yasunori Masutani in the original Japanese version and by John McCalmont in the Funimation dub. The character is named after the real life privateer Jean Bart.

=== Urouge ===
Urouge (ウルージ, Urūji), nicknamed the "Mad Monk" (怪僧, Kaisō), is the high priest of the Mad Monk Pirates.^{[ch. 498]} He is originally from some Sky Island. Urouge ate an unidentified Devil Fruit that allows him to increase his muscle mass, expanding his muscles and enlarged body size.^{[ch. 508]}

Urougue is voiced by Taiten Kusunoki in the original Japanese version and by Major Attaway in the Funimation dub.

== Roger Pirates ==
The Roger Pirates (ロジャー海賊団, Rojā Kaizokudan) were the pirate crew of the late King of the Pirates, Gol D. Roger, and were the only known crew to ever reach Laugh Tale.

Shanks and Buggy started out as cabin boys on the crew. Because the Samurai Kozuki Oden could read the Poneglyphs, he, alongside his wife Toki, children Momonosuke and Hiyori, as well as his retainers Dogstorm and Cat Viper, accompanied Roger and his crew for one year to learn the secrets of the world (such as the Void Century, ancient weapons, and the D. Family), as well as reaching the last island Laugh Tale. Douglas Bullet was an anime-exclusive former member of the Roger Pirates.

The Roger Pirates disbanded prior to Roger's execution, with the current whereabouts of most of its members being unknown.

=== Gol D. Roger ===
Gol D. Roger (ゴール・D・ロジャー, Gōru Dī Rojā), after gaining worldwide infamy as captain of the Roger Pirates, becomes better known as Gold Roger (ゴールド・ロジャー, Gōrudo Rojā), the King of the Pirates (海賊王, Kaizoku-Ō; lit. "Pirate King").^{[ch. 1, 154, 506]} Suffering from a terminal disease, he takes his crew on a complete voyage through the Grand Line before disbanding it and turning himself in to the World Government, which claims to have captured him, while secretly entrusting his son, Ace, to Monkey D. Garp.^{[ch. 506]} At his execution, before Rouge gives birth to Ace, and 22 years before the formation of the Straw Hat Crew, Roger inspires the "Great Pirate Era" by announcing that his treasure, the "One Piece", is up for the taking, though they will have to find it first.^{[ch. 1, 506, 550]} It is said after Roger's death that only Whitebeard could match him in a fight and that he had the ability to hear "the voice of all things", which allowed him and his crew to learn the secret history of the world.^{[ch. 233, 507]} He was also the original owner of Luffy's Straw Hat which fell into the possession of Shanks after his captain's death, with Shanks eventually passing it on to Luffy. Gol D. Roger has the highest known bounty in the series, with 5,564,800,000. Roger was a highly capable swordsman, skilled in advanced use of all three types of Haki.^{[ch. 966]}

Roger is originally voiced by Chikao Ōtsuka, and later by Masane Tsukayama. A younger Roger is voiced by Takeshi Kusao. In the 4Kids adaptation, Roger is voiced by Frederick B. Owens. Eric Stuart initially voiced Roger before being replaced with Owens. In the Funimation English adaptation, he is voiced by Sean Hennigan. In the live-action series, he is portrayed by Michael Dorman.

Roger is partially based on the real life pirate Olivier Levasseur.

=== Silvers Rayleigh ===
Silvers Rayleigh (シルバーズ・レイリー, Shirubāzu Reirī) is a swordsman and the first mate of the Roger Pirates. Having encountered a young Roger in his youth, he joined the crew as his first mate, developing his swordsmanship to the point he is known as the "Dark King" (冥王, Mei-Ō) and considered to be Roger's right-hand man.^{[ch. 603]}

After Roger's death, Rayleigh retires on the Sabaody Archipelago as a ship coater and gambler.^{[ch. 500]} He encounters and reveals his identity to the Straw Hat Crew on their arrival, coating the ship and becoming a vital ally for the crew. Following the war between the Whitebeard Pirates and the World Government, he trains Luffy to use Haki for two years.^{[ch. 503]} He is one of the only men to be respected by the Kuja Tribe, having married their former empress Shakuyaku.

Silvers Rayleigh is voiced by Keiichi Sonobe in the original Japanese version and by Bruce Carey in the Funimation dub.

The character is named after the real life statesman and explorer Walter Raleigh.

=== Scopper Gaban ===
Scopper Gaban (スコッパー・ギャバン, Sukoppā Gyaban) was the navigator of the Roger Pirates. He is known for his proficient skill in wielding axes and amorous nature, later being nicknamed the "Left Hand of the Pirate King". During his time in the Roger Pirates, he was infamous for his constant one-night stands which he is ashamed of after being acquainted with Ripley. After Roger's death, he retired in Elbaph and fathered the half-giant Collun through the giant Ripley.^{[ch. 1139,1147]} During the fight against Imu, Scopper Gaban loses his left arm.

Scopper Gaban is voiced by Toshiyuki Morikawa in the original Japanese version and by Ian Sinclair in the Funimation dub.

=== Crocus ===
Crocus (クロッカス, Kurokkasu) was the doctor of the Roger Pirates, who joined late to help with Roger's. He is the sole human resident of the Twin Capes, and who takes care of the giant whale Laboon.

Crocus was voiced by Gorō Naya and Masuo Amada in the original Japanese version, and by Jerry Russell, Burl W. Proctor and Gregory Lush in the Funimation dub. In the live-action series, Crocus is portrayed by Clive Russell.

=== Other Roger Pirates ===
- Donquino (ドンキーノ, Donkīno): A large man who is the helmsman of the Rogers Pirates. Donquino is voiced by Yūsuke Shirooka in the original Japanese version and by Van Barr Jr. in the Funimation dub.
- Moon Isaac Jr. (ムーン・アイザックJr., Mūn Aizakku Junia) : A long-nosed rotund man who is the tactical officer of the Rogers Pirates. Moon Isaac Jr. is voiced by Yūsuke Shirooka in the original Japanese version.
- Millet Pine (ミレ・パイン, Mire Pain): A short rotund man who is the interrogator/torturer of the Roger Pirates and wears a horned helmet.
- Rowing (ローウィング, Rowingu): A short rotund man who is the scholar of the Roger Pirates.
- Erio (エリオ): A slim man ina white fedora who is the information broker of the Roger Pirates. Following the disbandment of the Rogers Pirates, Erio's whereabouts are unknown. Erio is voiced by Tom Henry in the Funimation dub.
- Spencer (スペンサー, Supensā): The intelligence officer of the Roger Pirates. Spencer is voiced by Kristian Eros in the Funimation dub.
- Petermoo (ピータームー, Pītāmū): A short man with an egg-shaped body who is the gunner of the Roger Pirates.
- Blumarine (ブルマリン, Burumarin): A short older man who is the shipwright of the Roger Pirates.
- MAX Marx (MAX マークス, Makkusu Mākusu): A tall muscular man who is the cook of the Roger Pirates.
- Seagull Guns Nozdon (シーガル・ガンズ・ノズドン, Shīgaru Ganzu Nozudon): A very tall and muscular man who is a member of the Roger Pirates. Seagull Guns Nozdon is voiced by Neiji Hirai in the original Japanese version.
- Mr. Momora (Mr. モモラ, Misutā Momora): A very tall and thin man who is a member of the Roger Pirates. Mr. Momora is voiced by Ryōhei Arai in the original Japanese version and by Josh Putnam in the Funimation dub.
- Jacksonbanner (ジャクソンバナー, Jakusonbanā): A tall slim man who is the musician of the Roger Pirates.
- Sunbell (サンベル, Sanberu): A fish-man of indeterminate species and a member of the Roger Pirates. Sunbell is voiced by Yukinori Okuhata in the original Japanese version and by Gerardo Davila in the Funimation dub.
- Taro (タロウ, Tarō) is a member of the Roger Pirates. Taro is voiced by Toshiya Chiba in the original Japanese version.
- Doringo (ドリンゴ): A shorter man with long limbs and member of the Roger Pirates whose jacket has bat-like wings on its back. Doringo is voiced by Yukinori Okuhata in the original Japanese version.
- Ganryu (眼竜, Ganryū): A tall muscular man and a member of the Roger Pirates. Ganryu is voiced by Kazumasa Fukagawa in the original Japanese version.
- CB Gallant (CBギャラン, Shībī Gyaran): A large and very muscular man with short legs who is a member of the Roger Pirates.
- Yui (ユーイ, Yūi): A member of the Roger Pirates with wavy hair that goes straight up.
- Rangram (ラングラム, Ranguramu): A tall fit man who is a member of the Roger Pirates.
- Colonel Mugren (ミュグレン大佐, Myuguren Taisa): A large man with broad shoulders who is a member of the Roger Pirates.
- Bankuro (バンクロ): A short slender man with a puffy hair and beard who is a member of the Roger Pirates.
- Yamon (ヤモン): A member of the Roger Pirates who fights with a spear.

== East Blue ==
The following are pirates and pirate crews originating from the East Blue sea.

Former pirates in the East Blue include:

- "Red Foot" Zeff, now the Head Chef at Baratie.
- Gaimon was a pirate until his body became trapped in a chest.
- Koze (コゼ) and Packy (パッキー, Pakkī) were two members of the Yes Pirates. Koze is tall and thin while Packy is bulky and muscular. They were captured by Smoker and Tashigi in Loguetown and arrested.^{[ch. 96]}
- The Usopp Pirates (see below)
- The Arlong Pirates were also stationed in this sea for several years until they were arrested.

=== Black Cat Pirates ===
The Black Cat Pirates are a cat-themed crew of pirates led by their captain Kuro who considers them as nothing but pawns to carry out his plans and, if he so pleases, to die for him.^{[ch. 38]}

==== Kuro ====
Kuro (クロ, lit. "Black"), nicknamed "Kuro of the Thousand Plans" (百計のクロ, Hyakkei no Kuro), is the captain of the Black Cat Pirates, who is known for his elaborate schemes.^{[ch. 26]} Wishing to leave his identity behind, and to escape the wearying pirate lifestyle of always being on the run,^{[ch. 37]} he uses the name Klahadore (クラハドール Kurahadōru) and becomes butler to Kaya, a friend of Usopp.^{[ch. 23]} He considers his crew as nothing but pawns to carry out his plans and, if he so pleases, to die for him.^{[ch. 38]} Kuro fights using a pair of gloves equipped with long, straight, single edged blades. Wearing these, he adopted his signature habit of adjusting his constantly slipping glasses by using only the palm of his hand to avoid cutting his face.^{[ch. 33]}

In the anime, Kuro resumes pirate life following his defeat and sees that the bounty for Luffy has gone up following Arlong's defeat.

In the Japanese anime television series, Kuro is voiced by Kōichi Hashimoto. In the 4Kids English adaptation, he is voiced by Gary Mack while his voice actor in the Funimation English adaptation is Kent Williams. In the live-action series, he is portrayed by Alexandar Maniatis.

Carl Kimlinger of Anime News Network praised Kuro as being "both unspeakably cool and utterly vile".

==== Django ====
Django is the former captain and previously first mate of the Black Cat Pirates. He later joins the Marines.

==== Siam and Butchie ====
Siam (シャム, Shamu) and Butchie (ブチ, Buchi), known as the Nyaban Brothers (ニャーバン・兄弟(ブラザーズ), Nyāban Burazāzu), are the protector guards of the Bezan Black, the crew's ship.^{[ch. 31]} Both of them face Zoro, being defeated by him. Siam is voiced by Masaya Onosaka in the original Japanese version and by Eric Stuart and Todd Haberkorn in the 4Kids and Funimation dubs respectively. Butchie is voiced by Yasuhiro Takato in the original Japanese version and by Jimmy Zoppi and Chris Rager in the 4Kids and Funimation dubs respectively. In the live-action series, Siam's name is spelled as Sham and is depicted as female, being portrayed by Bianca Oosthuizen, while Butchie, whose name is spelled as Buchi, is portrayed by Albert Pretorius.

=== Krieg Pirates ===
The Krieg Pirates are a pirate crew led by Don Krieg.^{[ch. 46]} The crew consisted of the largest pirate fleet in the East Blue until their ships were sunk by Dracule Mihawk.

==== Don Krieg ====
Don Krieg (首領(ドン)・クリーク, Don Kurīku), nicknamed "Foul Play" Krieg (ダマシ討ちのクリーク, Damashi Uchi no Kurīku), is the captain of the Krieg Pirates, a man well known for his underhanded tactics.^{[ch. 46]} Krieg does not care for his crew and bullies them into fearing and obeying him.^{[ch. 49]} He punishes those who fail him and those who show weakness.^{[ch. 61f.]} Krieg wears a gilded suit of steel armor filled with hidden weapons such as guns, bombs, etc.^{[ch. 47]} Krieg also uses a weapon called the "Mighty Battle Spear", that is not only a spear, but can release explosions and remain intact.

Don Krieg is voiced by Fumihiko Tachiki in the original Japanese version and by Marc Thompson and Andy Mullins in the 4Kids and Funimation dub respectively.

In the live-action series, Don Kireg is portrayed by Milton Schorr. Krieg is only a minor character in this version as opposed to the source material. His fleet is also not destroyed by Mihawk at the Baratie, rather at an unknown location and he does not survive his duel with Mihawk.

==== Gin ====
Gin (ギン) is Krieg's combat commander. He arrived at the Baratie restaurant hungry, being saved by Sanji, who offered him a plate of food, after which Gin was grateful to the cook. Because of this, he ended up rebelling against his captain, especially once he ended up being defeated by Luffy, because he lost all the respect he had for him, thinking that he was someone indestructible.

Gin is voiced by Kenichi Ono in the original Japanese version. In the 4Kids dub, Gin is voiced by Peter Katana. In the Funimation dub, Gin is voiced by Illich Guardiola until 2014 and by David Matranga starting in the "Episode of East Blue" special. In the live-action series, Gin is portrayed by Litha Bam.

==== Pearl ====
Pearl (パール, Pāru) is a man protected by various shields. Although it is difficult to hurt him, he gets nervous if someone does the slightest injury to him, worrying everyone including his captain, as he begins to lose control.

Pearl is voiced by Hiroyuki Kawamoto in the original Japanese version and by Dan Green and J. Michael Tatum in the 4Kids and Funimation dub respectively.

=== Usopp Pirates ===
The Usopp Pirates were a pirate band formed in Syrup Village by Captain Usopp and three younger children: Carrot (にんじん, Ninjin), Pepper (ピーマン, Pīman), and Onion (たまねぎ, Tamanegi). The Straw Hats and Usopp Pirates fought against the Black Cat Pirates to defend their village. Usopp tearfully disbanded the Usopp Pirates afterwards to set sail with the Straw Hats.^{[ch. 40]}^{[ch. 41]} Carrot is voiced by Noriko Yoshitake in the original Japanese version and by Jim Napolitano and Kate Oxley in the 4Kids and Funimation dubs respectively. Pepper is voiced by Haruhi Terada in the earlier parts of the original Japanese version and by Miyuki Kawasho starting in Episode 291 and by Kevin Kolack and Cherami Leigh in the 4Kids and Funimation dubs (except for the English dub of the video game One Piece: Unlimited Adventure, where she is voiced by Laura Bailey). Onion is voiced by Makiko Ohmoto in the original Japanese version and by Oliver Wyman and Cynthia Cranz in the 4Kids and Funimation dubs respectively. Usopp is the only member of the Usopp Pirates who appears in the live-action series.

== North Blue ==
The following are pirates and pirate crews originating from the North Blue sea.

=== Bellamy Pirates ===
The Bellamy Pirates (ベラミー海賊団, Beramī Kaizokudan) was a pirate crew originating from the North Blue and allies with the Donquixote Pirates.

==== Bellamy ====
Bellamy "the Hyena" (ハイエナのベラミー, Haiena no Beramī) was the captain of the Bellamy Pirates, a blonde-haired man with the power of the Paramecia-type Boing-Boing Fruit (バネバネの実, Bane Bane no Mi), which allows him to turn his legs into springs to bounce off surfaces and gain momentum for his attacks.^{[ch. 230f.]} After his defeat at the hands of Luffy, Donquixote Doflamingo dismisses Bellamy, who later becomes a fighter in Dressrosa.^{[ch. 706]} Bellamy and Luffy befriended each other in Dressrosa and after Luffy defeated Doflamingo, Bellamy was present during the formation of the Straw Hat Grand Fleet.^{[ch. 799]}

In the anime television series, Bellamy's voice actor is Wataru Takagi. In the 4Kids English adaptation, he is voiced by Andrew Rannells. In the Funimation English adaptation, his voice is supplied by Justin Cook.

The character is named after the real life pirate Samuel Bellamy.

==== Other Bellamy Pirates members ====
The rest of the Bellamy Pirates consisted of:

- "Big Knife" Sarquiss (サーキース, Sākīsu; alt. "Sarkies"): A blue-haired bespectacled man who is Bellamy's first mate.^{[ch. 223]} He is voiced by Yuji Ueda in the original Japanese version and by Duncan Brannan in the Funimation dub.
- Lily (リリー, Rirī): A woman who often accompanied Sarquiss.^{[ch. 223]} She is voiced by Yuko Sumitomo in the original Japanese version and by Trina Nishimura in the Funimation dub.
- Eddy (エディ, Edi): The Bellamy Pirates' navigator. He is voiced by Hiroshi Kamiya in the original Japanese version. In the Funimation dub, he is voiced by Andy Baldwin in episodes 149 and 150 and by Zach Bolton in Episode 207.
- Mjure (ミュレ, Myure): The Bellamy Pirates' doctor. She is voiced by Yuko Shioyama in the original Japanese version and by Colleen Clinkenbeard in the Funimation dub.
- Hewitt (ヒューイット, Hyūitto): The Bellamy Pirates' cook.
- Rivers (リヴァーズ, Rivāzu): The Bellamy Pirates' sniper. He is voiced by Masaya Takatsuka in the original Japanese version and by Patrick Seitz in the Funimation dub.
- Ross (ロス, Rosu): The Bellamy Pirates' swordsman. He is voiced by Osamu Ryutani in the original Japanese version. In the Funimation dub, he is voiced by Scott Cantrell in earlier appearances and by Tyson Rinehart starting in Episode 207.
- Mani (マニ): The Bellamy Pirates' combatant. She is voiced by Brigette Goudeau in the Funimation dub.

=== Caribou Pirates ===
The Caribou Pirates (カリブー海賊団, Karibū kaizoku-dan) is a pirate group that encountered the Straw Hat Crew after they got back together.

- Caribou (カリブー, Karibū): Nicknamed "Wet-Haired" , is a rookie pirate and co-captain of the Caribou Pirates along with his young brother Coribou. He consumed the Swamp-Swamp Fruit which enables him to generate, control, and become a "swamp". Caribou is voiced by Masaki Terasoma in the original Japanese version and by Andrew Kasten in the Funimation dub.
- Coribou (コリブー, Koribū): Nicknamed "Blood Splatterer", is the egg-shaped younger brother of Caribou and co-captain of the Caribou Pirates. He wears a lizard on his head as a hairstyle. Coribou is voiced by Kohei Fukuhara in the original Japanese version and by Dalton Tindall in the Funimation dub.
- Momoo (モーム, Mōmu): A giant sea cow from the Grand Line (a Sea Beast with the head of a cow). He was originally introduced as part of the Arlong Pirates, being utilized by them as a method of intimidation towards the residents of the Conomi Islands. After Arlong Pirates' defeat, he was captured and employed as a draft animal by the Caribou Pirates.

== West Blue ==
The following are pirates and pirate crews originating from the West Blue sea.

=== Rumbar Pirates ===
The Rumbar Pirates (ルンバー海賊団, Runbā Kaizokudan) were a musical band of pirates active in the West Blue before the rise of Gol D. Roger. Their captain, Yorki, and other crew members left after contracting an incurable disease and the others were fatally poisoned by enemy pirates. Brook served as the second captain of the crew before his death, but was the sole survivor due to eating the Revive-Revive Fruit.

==== Yorki ====
Yorki (ヨーキ, Yōki), also known as "Calico" Yorki (キャラコのヨーキ, Kyarako no Yōki), was the captain of the Rumbar Pirates prior to his resignation after contracting a mysterious illness.^{[ch. 487]} Under Yorki, they entered the Grand Line at Reverse Mountain with the baby island whale Laboon.^{[ch. 487]} After Yorki left, Brook served as the acting captain, and the group were completely wiped out by an unknown foe approximately 50 years before the events aboard Thriller Bark with their doctor being killed by an enemy pirate crew that specialized in poison-tainted weapons.^{[ch. 488]}

In the original Japanese version of the anime, Yorki is voiced by Yasunori Masutani in the Episode 63 and by Eiji Takemoto in later appearances, while in the Funimation dub he is voiced by Charles Baker in the Episode 63 and by Chris Hury in later appearances. In the live-action series, he is portrayed by Richard Gau.

His epithet is based on that of the real life pirate Calico Jack.

== South Blue ==
The following are pirates and pirate crews originating from the South Blue sea.

=== Foxy Pirates ===
The Foxy Pirates (フォクシー海賊団, Fokushī Kaizokudan) is a crew specializing in a pirate game known as the "Davy Back Fight" wherein pirate crews can win crewmen from their opponents and their Jolly Roger. One example is when he won the Fanged Toad Pirates' captain Kibagaeru, its unnamed helmsman, and its unnamed navigator as well as their Jolly Roger leaving the rest of the Fanged Toad Pirates in disarray.^{[ch. 306]} The crew is led by Foxy.^{[ch. 309]}

==== Foxy ====
Foxy (フォクシー, Fokushī), nicknamed "Silver Fox" (銀ギツネ, Gin Gitsune), is the cheater and trickster captain of the Foxy Pirates.^{[ch. 307]} Though he acts supremely confident most of the time, he is extremely sensitive to insults or criticism.^{[ch. 306]} Having eaten the Slow-Slow Fruit (ノロノロの実, Noro Noro no Mi), Foxy can emit a beam with microscopic particles from his hands which can temporarily slow down any object, reducing its velocity while preserving kinetic energy.^{[ch. 309]}

Although in the manga Foxy only appears as the main antagonist of a story arc, he is a recurring opponent of Luffy's crew in the anime.

Foxy is voiced by Bin Shimada in the original Japanese version and by Jonathan Brooks in the Funimation English dub.

==== Other Foxy Pirates members ====
Other members of Foxy's crew include:

- Porche (ポルチェ, Poruche): The crew's idol. Porche is voiced by Sara Nakayama in the original Japanese version and by Tia Ballard in the Funimation dub.
- Hamburg (ハンバーグ, Hanbāgu): A gorilla-like human who occasionally serves as Foxy's mount and leader of the Groggy Monsters.^{[ch. 305]} Hamburg is voiced by Hirohiko Kakegawa in the original Japanese version and by Scott Freeman in the Funimation dub.

Former members of Foxy's crew include:

- Pickles (ピクルス, Pikurusu): A large and husky man who is a member of the Groggy Monsters. Pickles is voiced by Osamu Ryūtani in the original Japanese version and by Bradford Jackson in the Funimation dub.
- Big Pan (ビッグパン, Biggu Pan): A Wotan which is a result of a union between a giant and a fish-man, with his fish-type being a pond loach. He is a member of the Groggy Monsters. Big Pan is voiced by Mahito Ōba in the original Japanese version and by Andrew Chandler in the Funimation dub.
- Kibagaeru (キバガエル): The former captain of the Fanged Toad Pirates who Foxy claimed in the Davy Back Fight against them, leaving his crew in disarray and dying in a storm. In the anime-exclusive "Foxy Returns Arc", Kibagaeru briefly took over the Foxy Pirates. After being defeated by the Straw Hat Crew, Kibagaeru allowed Foxy to lead the Foxy Pirates again. Kibagaeru is voiced by Takashi Nagasako in the original Japanese version.
- Itomimizu (イトミミズ): The announcer and commentator. Itomimizu is voiced by Keiichi Nanba in the original Japanese version and by Ian Sinclair in the Funimation dub.
- Chuchun (チュチューン, Chuchūn): Itomimizu's pet giant sparrow and transport. Chuchun's vocal effects are provided by Hiroaki Hirata in the original Japanese version and by Chris Cason in the Funimation dub.
- Capote (カポーティ, Kapōti): A billfish-type fish-man. Capote is voiced by Hiroshi Tsuchida in the original Japanese version and by Phil Parsons in the Funimation dub.
- Monda (モンダ): A star shark. Monda's vocal effects are provided by Masaya Takatsuka in the original Japanese version and by John Burgmeier in the Funimation dub.
- Gina (ジーナ, Jīna): A shipwright for the Foxy Pirates.
- Sonieh (ソニエ, Sonie): The leader of the Foxy Pirates' 50 mechanics.
- Donovan (ドノバン, Donoban): One of the Foxy Pirates' 50 mechanics.
- Tony Tony Chopper also temporarily became a member during the Davy Back Fight.

The Foxy Pirates also have several anime-exclusive members:

- Mashikaku: A large and rectangular man. Mashikaku is voiced by Mike McFarland in the Funimation dub.
- Chiqicheetah: A crew member whose unnamed Devil Fruit enables him to turn into a cheetah and a cheetah-human hybrid. Chiqicheetah is voiced by Hiroshi Tsuchida in the original Japanese version and by Jessie James Grelle in the Funimation dub.
- Jube: A squid-type fish-man. Jube is voiced by Hirohiko Kakegawa in the original Japanese version and by Charles Baker in the Funimation dub.
- Girarin: An unspecified fish-man. Girarin is voiced by Masaya Takatsuka in the original Japanese version and by Z. Charles Bolton in the Funimation dub.
- Rokuroshi: The head referee for Hit and Dead Ball. Rokurokushi is voiced by Tomohisa Asō in the original Japanese version and by Tony Oliver in the Funimation dub.
- Nico Robin also temporarily became a member during the Davy Back Fight in anime-exclusive events.

== Paradise, Grand Line ==
The following are pirates and pirate crews originating from Paradise, the first half of the Grand Line sea.

=== Bliking Pirates ===
The Bliking Pirates (ブリキング海賊団, Burikingu Kaizokudan) are a group of pirates from Drum Island. Some of its members later join the Evil Black Drum Kingdom.

- Wapol: The former captain of the crew.
- Chess (チェス, Chesu): An underling of Wapol who is a skilled archer. He used to be the minister of defense during Wapol's rule over Drum Island. During his fight with the Straw Hat Pirates, Chess and Kuromarimo were fused into Chessmarimo by Wapol's Baku Baku Factory. In One Piece: Stampede, Chess and Kuromarimo split back into their original bodies. Chess is voiced by Yusuke Numata in the original Japanese version and by David Chen and Kyle C. Jones in the 4Kids and Funimation dub respectively. In the live-action series, he is portrayed by Mark Penwill.
- Kuromarimo (クロマーリモ, Kuromārimo): An underling of Wapol whose fighting style revolves around throwing parts of his Afro hair-cut. He used to be a magistrate during Wapol's rule over Drum Island. During his fight with the Straw Hat Pirates, Kuromarimo and Chess were fused into Chessmarimo by Wapol's Baku Baku Factory. They were defeated by Tony Tony Chopper. In One Piece: Stampede, Chess and Kuromarimo split back into their original bodies. Kuromarimo is voiced by Kenji Nomura in the original Japanese version and by Jamie McGonnigal and Charles Baker in the 4Kids and Funimation dub respectively. In the live-action series he is renamed as "K.M.", and is portrayed by Anton David Jeftha.
- Robson (ロブソン, Robuson): A White Walkie (a creature resembling woolly hippopotamus), which serves as a mount for Wapol. Robson's vocal effects are provided by Kenji Nomura in the original Japanese version and by Kyle Phillips in the Funimation dub.

The 9th movie also includes Wapol's brother Musshuru as part of the crew.

=== Brownbeard Pirates ===
The Brownbeard Pirates (茶ひげ海賊団, Cha hi-ge kaizoku-dan) are a pirate group who had their lower body parts replaced by animal parts by Trafalgar Law after they were badly defeated by Basil Hawkins.

==== Brownbeard ====
Chadros Higelyges (チャドロス・ヒゲリゲス, Chadorosu Higerigesu), better known as Brownbeard (茶ひげ, Chahige), is a large man and the captain of the Brownbeard Pirates who has large alligator legs added by Law, giving him a centaur-like appearance. He and his remaining crew members helped to form the Centaur Patrol Unit which worked for Caesar Clown. After Caesar Clown was defeated, Brownbeard and his crew surrendered to Smoker.

Brownbeard is voiced by Yasuhiko Tokuyama in Episode 491 of the original Japanese version, Kazunari Tanaka in Episode 511 of the original Japanese version, and Masashi Sugawara starting in Episode 583 of the original Japanese version. In the Funimation dub, he is voiced by Randy E. Aguebor.

==== Other Brownbeard Pirates members ====
- Smooge (スムージ, Sumūji): A member of the Brownbeard Pirates who resembles a normal centaur. Smooge is voiced by Kōhei Fukuhara in the original Japanese version and by Eric Rolon in the Funimation dub.
- Chappe (チャッペ): A cattle-like centaur and member of the Brownbeard Pirates. Chappe is voiced by Eiji Takemoto in the original Japanese version and by Chris Thurman in the Funimation dub.
- Run (ルン): A member of the Brownbeard Pirates who resembles a drider. Run is voiced by Masaya Takatsuka in the original Japanese version and by Timothy McNamee in the Funimation dub.
- Hyoutauros (ヒョウタウロス, Hyōtaurosu): A jaguar-like centaur and member of the Brownbeard Pirates. Hyoutauros is voiced by Kōhei Fukuhara in the original Japanese version and by Ray Gestaut in the Funimation dub.
- Kirintauros (キリンタウロス, Kirintaurosu): A giraffe-like centaur and member of the Brownbeard Pirates. Kirintauros is voiced by Yūsei Oda in the original Japanese version and by Phillip Annarella in the Funimation dub.
- Unidentified members include a deer-type centaur, a rhinoceros-type centaur, a zebra-type centaur, and a tapir-type centaur.

=== Monkey Mountain Allied Force ===
The Monkey Mountain Allied Force (猿山連合軍, Saruyama Rengō-gun) is a group formed between three pirate captains. Originally stationed in Jaya, they helped the Straw Hat Crew in getting to Skypiea.

- Mont Blanc Cricket (モンブラン・クリケット, Monburan Kuriketto): The leader of the Monkey Mountain Allied Forces who is a descendant of Mont Blanc Noland, who was known as "Liar Noland" because of lying about the existence of a City of Gold. Cricket, believing that Noland was telling the truth, spent years searching for that city.^{[ch. 228]} Mont Black Cricket is voiced by Takashi Taniguchi in the original Japanese version and by George Manley in the Funimation dub.
- Masira (マシラ, Mashira): Also known as "Salvage King" Masira (サルベージ王マシラ, Sarubēji-Ō Mashira), is the captain of the Masira Pirates (originating from the North Blue) with ape-like features who are responsible for refloating the treasures of the sunken ships.^{[ch. 219]} Masira is voiced by Aruno Tahara in the original Japanese version and by Jeremy Inman in the Funimation dub.
- Shoujou (ショウジョウ, Shōjō): Also known as "Sonar King" Shoujou (海底探索王ショウジョウ, Kaitei Tansaku Ō Shōjō), is Masira's orangutan-faced sworn brother and the captain of the Shoujou Pirates (originating from the South Blue) who are responsible for sinking ships.^{[ch. 226]} Shoujou is voiced by Isamu Tanonaka in the original Japanese version and by Jonathan C. Osborne.

== Sea Floor ==
The following are pirates and pirate crews originating from the sea floor, specifically from the Fish-Man Island.

=== Arlong Pirates ===
The Arlong Pirates (アーロン一味, Āron Ichimi) are a pirate crew consisting mostly of fishmen led by the sawshark-type fish-man Arlong and several officers.

Hatchan, Momoo and Nami used to be members until the latter left the crew following its defeat by the Straw Hats.^{[ch. 69, 75, 93f.]}

==== Arlong ====
"Saw-Tooth" Arlong (ノコギリのアーロン, Nokogiri no Āron) is a sawshark-type fish-man and fish-man supremacist.^{[ch. 69, 71]} Growing up in a rough part of Fish-Man Island, he becomes captain of the Arlong Pirates, who temporarily merge with other fishmen to form the Sun Pirates.^{[ch. 621, 624]} Arlong's powerful jaws have rapidly re-growing teeth capable of rending stone.^{[ch. 90]} His favorite weapon is the sword-like Shark Saw (キリバチ, Kiribachi) with its six tooth-shaped blades.^{[ch. 92]}

In the original Japanese series, Arlong's voice actor is Jūrōta Kosugi. In the 4Kids English adaptation, he is voiced by David Wills. In the Funimation English adaptation, his voice is supplied by Chris Rager.

==== Hatchan ====
Hatchan (はっちゃん), often called Hachi (ハチ), is an octopus-type fish-man first introduced as an officer of the Arlong Pirates.^{[ch. 73]} Being half octopus, he can spit large quantities of black ink and use suction pads to stick to walls.^{[ch. 83f.]} He fights using six swords, holding one in each arm-tentacle.^{[ch. 84]}

After his crew is defeated by the Straw Hat Crew, he escapes from captivity and opens a floating takoyaki restaurant.^{[ch. 182–228: chapter cover pages]} Hatchan becomes close friends with Camie and Pappagu.^{[ch. 490f.]} He later befriends the Straw Hats when they visit the Sabaody Archipelago.^{[ch. 496, 506]}

Hatchan's voice actor is Toshiyuki Morikawa. In the 4Kids and Funimation English adaptations, his voice is supplied by Sean Schemmel and George Manley, respectively.

In the live-action series, Hatchan was replaced by a barred knifejaw–type fish man (portrayed by Jaid Norman), who was unnamed in the manga and in this series was named "Hachi" after him. Hatchan's absence was due to budget constraints that prevented season one from having ten episodes, though showrunner Matt Owens plans to have him appear in said adaption during the Sabaody Archipelago arc.

==== Kuroobi ====
Kuroobi (クロオビ, Kurōbi) is a manta ray–type fish-man who uses "Fishman Karate", and one of the officers of the Arlong Pirates. He confronts Sanji at Arlong Park, ending up being defeated.

Kuroobi is voiced by Hisao Egawa in the original Japanese version and by Sean Schemmel and Patrick Seitz in the 4Kids and Funimation dub respectively. In the live-action series, he is portrayed by Jandre le Roux.

==== Choo ====
Choo (チュウ, Chū) is a Japanese whiting–type fish-man who spits water as if they were firing bullets and one of the officers of the Arlong Pirates. He confronts Usopp, ending up being defeated.

Choo is voiced by Masaya Onosaka in the original Japanese version and by Tom Wayland and Jay Hickman in the 4Kids and Funimation dub respectively. In the live-action series, he is portrayed by Len-Barry Simons.

=== Fisher Tiger ===
Fisher Tiger (フィッシャー・タイガー, Fisshā Taigā) is a sea bream-type fish-man who was the founder and first captain of the Sun Pirates. Fisher Tiger, Arlong and Jimbei grew up together as sworn brothers from the Fish-Man District.^{[ch. 621]} Fisher Tiger was later enslaved before being freed by Shanks at Mary Geoise. Fisher Tiger went on to escape and free other enslaved peoples, including mermen, fish-men, and Boa Hancock and her two sisters. After he escaped, Fisher Tiger, Jimbei, the Arlong Pirates, the Macro Pirates, and the newly freed Fish-men and mermen adopted the Sun insignia as founding members of the Sun Pirates. After he died from blood loss following an ambush by the Marines, he was succeeded by Jimbei. Fisher Tiger is voiced by Kōji Ishii in the original Japanese version and by Gabe Kunda in the Funimation dub.

=== Macro Pirates ===
The Macro Pirates (マクロ一味, Makuro Ichimi) are a crew formed by former members of the Sun Pirates who now work as kidnappers. They kidnapped Camie multiple times.

- Macro (マクロ, Makuro): A pelican eel-type fish-man and captain of the crew.^{[ch. 492]} Macro is voiced by Takashi Nagasaki in the original Japanese version and by Hunter Scott in the Funimation dub.
- Gyaro (ギャロ): A pop-eyed goldfish-type fish-man.^{[ch. 492]} Gyaro is voiced by Yūsei Oda in the original Japanese version and by Patric Carroll in the Funimation dub.
- Tansui (タンスイ): An arowana-type fish-man.^{[ch. 492]}

=== New Fish-Man–Flying Pirates Alliance ===
The New Fish-Man Pirates (新魚人海賊団, Shin-Gyojin Kaizoku-dan) are a pirate group of fish-men supremacists who ally with the Flying Pirates (フライング海賊団, Furaingu Kaizokudan), a group of fish-man pirates founded by Vander Decken IX. Together they plot the complete destruction of Fish-Man Island by initiating a coup d'etat. Jones broadcasts a message to the island, announcing that he will execute Neptune, its current ruler, to take over the kingdom, and then kill the Straw Hat Crew. However, Luffy eventually teams up with Jimbei to launch a combined assault on the pirate crews, defeating them and saving Fish-Man Island.

==== New Fish-Man Pirates ====
- Hordy Jones (ホーディ・ジョーンズ, Hōdi Jōnzu): A great white shark-type fish-man and the leader of the New Fishman Pirates.^{[ch. 631]} Hordy is responsible for assassinating Otohime, the queen of Fish-Man Island. He uses a Sea Giraffe as his steed. Hordy Jones is voiced by Jōji Nakata in the original Japanese version and by Larry Brantley in the Funimation dub.
- Dosun (ドスン): A hammerhead shark-type fish-man who uses a Sea Elephant as his steed. Dosun is voiced by Takahiro Yoshimizu in the original Japanese version and by Christian Taylor in the Funimation dub.
- Zeo (ゼオ): A Japanese wobbegong-type fish-man who uses a Sea Rhinoceros as his steed. Zeo is voiced by Shintarō Asanuma in the original Japanese version and by Nazeeh Tarsha in the Funimation dub.
- Daruma (ダルマ): A cookiecutter shark-type fish-man. Daruma is voiced by Hisayoshi Suganuma in the original Japanese version and by Oscar Seung in the Funimation dub.
- Ikaros Munch (イカロス・ムッヒ, Ikarosu Muhhi): A giant squid-type fish-man. Ikaros Munch is voiced by Keiji Hirai in the original Japanese version and by Ethan Gallardo in the Funimation dub.
- Hyouzou (ヒョウゾウ, Hyōzō): A poisonous blue-ringed octopus-type merman who serves as the New Fishman Pirates' assassin and uses a Sea Gorilla as his steed. Hyouzou is voiced by Tetsuo Sakaguchi in the original Japanese version and by Dave Woodard in the Funimation dub.

==== Flying Pirates ====
- Vander Decken IX (バンダー・デッケン九世, Bandā Dekken Kyūsei): A Japanese bullhead shark-type fish-man and the leader of the Flying Pirates. He possesses the power of the Paramecia-type Target-Target Fruit (マトマトの実, Mato-Mato no Mi) that enables him to lock on any target at will so long as he touches the target first. Despite lacking the ability to swim, he retains the ability to survive underwater. Vander Decken IX is voiced by Wataru Takagi in the original Japanese version and by Jim Foronda in the Funimation dub.
- Wadatsumi is a former member of the crew.

== New World, Grand Line ==
The following are pirates and pirate crews originating from New World, the second half of the Grand Line sea.

=== Giant Warrior Pirates ===
The Giant Warrior Pirates are a group of pirates originating from Elbaph. After a brief disbandment, they reunite to help Luffy fight the Marines on Egghead.

==== Brogy and Dorry ====
Brogy (ブロギー, Burogī) and Dorry (ドリー, Dorī), co-captains of the Giant Warrior Pirates, are two giants living on Little Garden, where they have dueled for over a century. The Straw Hats saved them from being caught by the members of Baroque Works led by Mr. 3. After ending their duel after the time skip, Brogy and Dorry head to Elbaph, they to help Shanks to fight the Kid Pirates. Shortly afterwards they traveled to Egghead, where they met up with the Straw Hats again, and guided them to Elbaph.

Brogy is voiced by Tetsu Inada in the original Japanese version and by Jonathan C. Osborne in the Funimation dub. Dorry is voiced by Daisuke Gōri in the original Japanese version and by Bob Carter in the Funimation dub. In the live-action series, Brogy and Dorry are portrayed by Brendan Murray and Werner Coetser, respectively.

==== Oimo ====
Oimo (オイモ) is a 52 ft. giant and member of the Giant Warrior Pirates. After their disbandment, Oimo worked as a guard at Enies Lobby. He later defects from the World Government. By the time the Straw Hat Crew were on Egghead, Oimo has rejoined the Giant Warrior Pirates and arrived on Egghead to help them. Oimo is revealed to have a grandson named Olav.

Oimo is voiced by Hiroshi Okamoto in the original Japanese version and by Tyson Rhinehart in the Funimation dub.

==== Kashii ====
Kashii (カーシー, Kāshī) is a 55 ft. giant and member of the Giant Warrior Pirates. After their disbandment, Kashii worked as a guard at Enies Lobby. He later defects from the World Government. By the time the Straw Hat Crew were on Egghead, Kashii has rejoined the Giant Warrior Pirates and arrived on Egghead to help them.

Kashii is voiced by Kōhei Fukuhara in the original Japanese version and by Jeff Johnson in the Funimation dub.

==== Other Giant Warrior Pirates ====
- Bjorn (ビョルン, Byorun): A giant and member of the Giant Warrior Pirates. Bjorn is voiced by Fukushi Ochiai in the original Japanese version.
- Sig (シグ, Shigu): A goggles-wearing giant and member of the Giant Warrior Pirates. Sig is voiced by Ryosuke Asano in the original Japanese version and by Phil Parsons in the Funimation dub.
- Thormann (トールマン, Tōruman): A long-nosed giant in Hoplite-like attire and member of the Giant Warrior Pirates. Thormann is voiced by Nao Katagai.
- Gantonio (ガントニオ, Gantonio): A giant and member of the Giant Warrior Pirates.
- Jericho (ジェリコ, Jeriko): A giant with a puffy beard who is a member of the Giant Warrior Pirates.
- Hogan (ホウガン, Hōgan): A green-haired large-chinned giant in goggles and member of the Giant Warrior Pirates.
- Killkhan (キルカーン, Kirukān): An overweight green-haired giant with obscured eyes and member of the Giant Warrior Pirates.

=== Rocks Pirates ===
Rocks Pirates
Name	Actor(s)		
Name	JP	US	Live
Rocks D. Xebec	Shinshū Fuji	TBD	TBD
Shiki	Naoto Takenaka	Scott McNeil	TBD
Buckingham Stussy	Reiko Suzuki	Erica Schroeder	TBD
Don Marlon	TBD	TBD	TBD
Edward Newgate	Kinryu Arimoto Ryūzaburō Ōtomo	R Bruce Elliott	TBD
Wang Zhi	TBD	TBD	TBD
Ganzui	TBD	TBD	TBD
John	Hiroshi Okamoto	Ken Marmon	TBD
Gill Bastar	TBD	TBD	TBD
Kyo	TBD	TBD	TBD
Charlotte Linlin	Toshiko Fujita Mami Koyama	Pam Dougherty	TBD
Streusen	Haruhiko Jō	Ben Phillips	TBD
Kaido	Tesshō Genda	David Sobolov	TBD
Barbell	TBD	TBD	TBD
Gloriosa	Ako Mayama	Nancy Sherrand	TBD

The Rocks Pirates (ロックス海賊団, Rokkusu Kaizokudan) were a powerful crew that dominated the seas forty years before the current events of the series; their strength, alongside their reckless and amoral actions led to them being considered a terrorist organization. At one point, they visited Elbaph, intending to see King Harald, and encountered Loki. Its former members would become extremely notorious and powerful individuals such as the Emperors Whitebeard, Big Mom and her later chef Streusen, and Kaido, Shiki of the Golden Lion Pirates, Buckingham Stussy of MADS, and former empress of Amazon Lily Gloriosa.^{[ch. 957,1096,1156]} They were defeated on the island of God Valley (ゴッドバレー, Goddo Barē) by the combined efforts of Monkey D. Garp and Gol D. Roger. The World Economy News Paper gave Garp full credit of stopping the Rocks Pirates much to his dismay.

==== Rocks D. Xebec ====
Rocks D. Xebec (ロックス・D・ジーベック, Rokkusu Dī Jībekku), born Davy D. Xebec, is the captain of the Rocks Pirates, the father of Marshall D. Teach, and a descendant of Davy D. Jones, former "King of the World". A violent man with incredible strength, Xebec desires to be "King of the World", gaining undying infamy after kidnapping five kings and killing an unnamed Admiral at a Reverie 56 years before the Holy Knights attacked Elbaph; the uproar he caused helped Harald to escape. He then hijacked a ship bound for Mariejoa laden with tribute and destroyed the Gates of Justice while fleeing; his deeds and Davy Back Fights led to him recruiting many prominent, fearsome pirates, and after four years, he raided Fullalead to serve as his base.^{[ch. 1155]} As a child, Loki idolized Xebec and approached him on Elbaph, seeking to join his crew, only for Xebec to severely injure the boy giant to discourage him from ever joining.^{[ch. 1145]} Xebec's threat grew to a point where the World Government was willing to accept Elbaph on the condition Harald kills him.^{[ch. 1157]} Xebec and Harald later fought to a draw and Xebec gave up on recruiting Harald.^{[ch. 1158]} Imu later possessed Xebec and transformed him into a demon to have him attack his family.^{[ch. 1163]} Rocks was killed by the World Government some time later. The Rocks Pirates break up, with their members' reputation being tarnished to have been untrustworthy.^{[ch. 1096,1159,1165]} Xebec was gradually erased from history and forgotten by the public by World Government propaganda, to the point only Marines who were present back then knew of his existence.^{[ch. 957]}

Rocks D. Xebec is voiced by Shinshū Fuji in the original Japanese version.

==== Shiki ====
Shiki (シキ), also known as Shiki the Golden Lion (金獅子のシキ, Kinjishi no Shiki), is a mobster and former member of the Rocks Pirates with sword-like prosthetic for feet. A prominent member of the crew, he is from the Yano Country and was present at the God Valley incident.^{[ch. 1165]} Shiki later formed the Golden Lion Pirates and also being served by an army of mutant animals. After escaping from Impel Down at the time the first to do so, he unsuccessfully attempted to recruit Roger for his dreams of world domination.^{[ch. 0,1096]} Outside of being the first pirate to escape from Impel Down, Shiki later consumed the Float-Float Fruit which enables him to make himself and any object float. He developed his own plans for decades since Roger's death only to make the fatal mistake of forcibly recruiting Nami and earning a humiliating defeat by Monkey D. Luffy by the time of the film One Piece Film: Strong World. Shiki is voiced by Naoto Takenata in the original Japanese version and by Scott McNeil in the Funimation dub.

==== Buckingham Stussy ====
Buckingham Stussy (バッキンガム・ステューシー, Bakkingamu Sutyūshī), also known as "Miss Buckin" (ミス・バッキン, Misu Bakkin), is the mother of Edward Weevil. She is a former member of the Rocks Pirates, a former member of MADS and the self-proclaimed lover of Whitebeard. While a competent combatant to have been recruited by Rocks D. Xebec, she contributed next to nothing at MADS outside of having a clone of her named Stussy be produced.

Buckingham Stussy is voiced by Reiko Suzuki in the original Japanese version and by Erica Schroeder in the Funimation dub.

==== Captain John ====
Captain John (ジョン, Jon) is a former member of the Rocks Pirates. A greedy and loathsome drunkard who is nevertheless a competent combatant, he was present during the God Valley incident and was a previous consumer of the Magnet-Magnet Fruit. Afterwards, John formed his own crew and collecting a significant amount of treasure. After he was killed by his crew for his greed, John's corpse was later stolen from his grave by Gecko Moria and made into a General Zombie.^{[ch. 451,1096]} His armband, which was the key to finding his treasure, was taken by Luffy after Moria was defeated^{[ch. 486]} and later traded to Buggy for his assistance in Impel Down.^{[ch. 527]} John is voiced by Hiroshi Okamoto in the original Japanese version and by Ken Marmon in the Funimation dub.

==== Ganzui ====
Ganzui (ガンズイ) is a smuggler by trade of great size who was the original consumer of the Bomb-Bomb Fruit. He is involved in the God Valley Incident. Ganzui dies sometime after the God Valley Incident. Ganzui's corpse was stolen by Gecko Moria and made into a General Zombie.^{[ch. 451,1096,1155]}

==== Gill Bastar ====
Gill Bastar (ギル・バスター, Giru Basutā) is a skilled sharpshooter and former member of the Rocks Pirates who was a previous consumer of the Hollow-Hollow Fruit. He gains an extra pair of arms during his tenure on the crew to improve his strength before being involved in the God Valley incident.^{[ch. 1165]} He dies sometime after the incident with his corpse later stolen by Gecko Moria and made into a General Zombie. Bastar's creation predates One Piece, having debuted in 1992 in Eiichiro Oda's first one-shot manga Wanted!, where a younger Bastar without his extra arms serves as the protagonist.^{[ch. 451,1096]}

==== Wang Zhi ====
Wang Zhi (王直, Ōchoku) is a guru and former member of the Rocks Pirates. During the rescue mission of Shakuyaku, Wang Zhi stayed behind on Hachinosu.^{[ch. 1160]} After the God Valley incident, he captured Fullalead, his former crew's base, where he resided until he is defeated with the combined forces of Marshall D. Teach and Koby, with Teach taking control of the island like his father.^{[ch. 1096,1155]}

==== Other Rocks Pirates ====
- Don Marlon (マーロン, Māron): A gangster from the West Blue who wears a black fedora and smokes a cigar. He is killed during a confrontation where Shakuyaku is kidnapped.^{[ch. 1155,1159]}
- Kyo (兇, Kyō): A mobster and rival of Shiki who was later known as Silver Axe.^{[ch. 1156]}
- Barbell (バーベル, Bāberu): A catfish Fish-Man who was present at the God Valley incident.^{[ch. 1096,1156]}

== Anime-exclusive pirates ==
There are several pirate and pirate crews exclusive of Toei Animation's anime series:

=== Barbar Pirates ===
The Barbar Pirates are sand pirates of the Kingdom of Alabasta:

- Barbarossa (バルバロッサ, Barubarossa): The captain of the Barbar Pirates. After a bad encounter with Luffy and his friends after meeting them, he quickly becomes friends with them when he sees that they are pirates like him. Barbarossa is voiced by Chō in the original Japanese version, David Brimmer in the 4Kids dub, and by Jeremy Inman in the Funimation dub.
- Rasa (ラサ): The navigator of the Barbar Pirates. In the past, Rasa lived in a small oasis village called Melias that's located in Yuba before it was buried in sand and abandoned. After which, she lost faith in the Nefertari family to help the kingdom prosper. Rasa is voiced by Miki Nagasawa in the original Japanese version, Caren Lyn Tackett in the 4Kids dub, and by Trina Nishimura in the Funimation dub.
- Zaba (ザバ): A member of the Barbar pirates. He thinks more logically and is shown more calmer than many of his crewmates. Zaba is voiced by Shinichiro Ohta in the original Japanese version and by Phil Parsons in the Funimation dub.

=== Amigo Pirates ===
The Amigo Pirates are a crew allied with Shiki who tried to attack the Little East Blue.

- Largo (ラルゴ, Rarugo): The captain of the Amigo Pirates, an ally of Shiki, and the main antagonist of the anime-exclusive Little East Blue arc. He ate the Net-Net Fruit which enables him to create nets out of a sticky material. Llargo is voiced by Wataru Takagi in the original Japanese version and by Leraldo Anzaldua in the Funimation dub.
- Corto (コルト, Koruto): The brother of Largo and a member of the Amigo Pirates. He dresses like a luchador. Corto is voiced by Hisao Egawa in the original Japanese version and by Ricco Fajardo in the Funimation dub.

=== Breed ===
Breed (ブリード, Burīdo) is the former captain of the Breed Pirates and the main antagonist of the anime-exclusive Caesar Retrieval arc. He ate the Pet-Pet Fruit, which enables him to produce a green gel that can be used to make collars that control whoever they are placed on. Breed's crew engineered a mutiny, which led to Breed having to form a new crew by enslaving the Sea Animal Pirates led by a Kung-Fu Dugong. Breed planned to use the captive Caesar Clown to make SMILE Fruits for him by having him abducted from the Straw Hat Pirates' ship following the departure from Dressrosa. His plans were thwarted by Luffy who freed the Kung-Fu Dugong.

Breed is voiced by Kazuya Ichijō in the original Japanese version and by Oliver Tull in the Funimation dub.

== See also ==
- List of One Piece characters
- World Government (One Piece)
