= Jay Anstey =

South African actress and model (born 1991)

- Born: Jessica Carly Anstey; 13 February 1991 (age 35); Pretoria, South Africa
- Education: Pretoria Technikon
- Occupations: Actress, model
- Years active: 2006–present
- Height: 1.79 m (5 ft 10 in)
- Spouses: Jonathan Boynton-Lee (sep.) Sean-Marco Vorster (m. 2021; sep. 2024)
- Parents: Norman Anstey (father); Penny Anstey (mother)

Jessica "Jay" Carly Anstey (born 13 February 1991), popularly known as Jay Anstey, is a South African actress and model. She is best known for the roles in the films, Sleeper's Wake, Farewell Ella Bella, Tremors: A Cold Day in Hell, and Hell Trip.

== Personal life ==
Jessica Anstey was born on 13 February 1991 in Pretoria, South Africa. Her father Norman Anstey is also an actor and her mother Penny Anstey was a dancer with the PACT ballet company. During her school years, she excelled in piano, singing and ballroom dancing. She has one sister, Amy, who is also an actress.

She had a long-standing relationship with Jonathan Boynton-Lee, a fellow actor and Top Billing presenter. They were also nominated by "You Spec" as couple of the year. However, they eventually separated, citing miscommunication and conflicting schedules. Then in 2017, she dated Sean Kaplan.

In 2021, she married fellow actor Sean-Marco Vorster. They separated in 2024.

== Career ==
She obtained her national diploma in dramatic arts from the Pretoria Technikon. After completing her diploma, she started to feature in commercials for Supersport, Red Berry, the University of Johannesburg and Edgars.

In 2006, she made her film debut with Catch a Fire and played the role "Katie Vos". After that she appeared in many films, such as Two Worlds, Sleeper's Wake, Friend Request and Rakka. In 2011, she made her television debut with the role "Charlie Holmes" on the SABC3 soap Isidingo. The role was a turning point in her acting career; she played the role for seven consecutive years until 2012. In 2012, Anstey appeared in the Canadian film Inescapable. In 2013, she joined the fifth season of the SABC1 reality competition Tropika Island of Treasure as one of the celebrity contestant. In the same year, she joined the sixth season of the SABC3 reality competition Strictly Come Dancing. Meanwhile, she made television appearances in M-Net series Snitch, Rhythm City on e.tv and Young Leonardo for the BBC.

In 2018, she had the lead role of Elle in the horror film Farewell Ella Bella. The film was made theatrical screening in the USA. In 2020, she joined the M-Net (DStv 101) television serial Inconceivable. In the same year, she joined another serial, Legacy, in the role of Alexandra "Lexi" Price.

== Filmography ==
Year	Film	Role	Genre	Ref.
2006	Catch a Fire	Katie Vos	Film	
2006	Snitch	Kylie Watts	TV series	
2006	Heartlines	Alice Anderson	Film	
2007	Rhythm City	Chrizette	TV series	
2007	Les deux mondes	Jana	Film	
2008	Strictly Come Dancing		TV series	
2011	Isidingo: The Need	Charlie Holmes	TV series	
2011	Leonardo	Petronella	TV series	
2012	Inescapable	Muna Abdul-Kareem	Film	
2012	Sleeper's Wake	Jackie Venter	Film	
2013	Tropika Island of Treasure		TV series	
2014	Leading Lady	Model 2	Film	
2015	Friend Request	Girl 1	Film	
2015	Abo Mzala	Jessica	TV series	
2017	Heart Aka 4 Minutes	Louis' Nurse	Short film	
2017	Harry's Game	Hammer	Film	
2017	Isibaya	Susan	TV series	
2017	Rakka	Woman Bomber	Short film	
2017	Blood Drive	Diane	TV series	
2018	Tremors: A Cold Day in Hell	Dr. D	Video	
2018	Farewell Ella Bella	Elle	Film	
2018	Hell Trip	Emily Larson, Stunt performer	Film	
2019	The Girl from St. Agnes	Debbie	Film	
2020	The Last Days of American Crime	Female Terrified Officer	TV series	
2020	Inconceivable	Tamsin Watts	TV series	
2020	Legacy	Alexandra "Lexi" Price	TV series	
