= Legacy (South African TV series) =

South African television drama

- Genre: Drama Telenovela
- Created by: Phatutshedzo Makwarela Gwydion Benyon
- Written by: Bonga Percy Vilakazi, Thato Dipholo, Caroline Kganyago, Paul Crilley
- Directed by: Catherine Cooke; Krijay Govender; Johnny Barbuzano
- Starring: Kgomotso Christopher; Mary-Anne Barlow; Michelle Botes; Siyabonga Thwala; Dawid Minnaar; Anton David Jeftha; Trix Vivier; Jay Anstey; Reandi Grey; Nell McCarthy; Sean-Marco Vorster; Caddy Tsotetsi; Lunga Shabalala; Leeanda Reddy
- Country of origin: South Africa
- Original language: Multilingual (non-English subtitled)
- No. of seasons: 2
- No. of episodes: 416

Production
- Executive producer: Phatutshedzo Makwarela Gwydion Benyon
- Production location: Johannesburg Sandton
- Running time: 22–24 minutes
- Production company: Tshedza Pictures

Original release
- Network: M-Net
- Release: 21 September 2020

Legacy was a South African television drama telenovela series created by executive producers Phatutshedzo Makwarela and Gwidyon Benyon. It is an M-Net original production for premium subscription television channel M-Net produced by Tshedza Pictures. The series focuses on the Price family and the struggle for power over the Price empire after the death of the family's patriarch Sebastian Price. This is the channel's very first telenovela.

On 22 May 2021/15th Annual SAFTA, it won its first award for Best Telenovela category. The series finale episode aired in September 2022 after two successful seasons (416 episode)

== Plot ==
Sebastian Price, the patriarch of the family is expected to retire from his position as CEO of Legacy Investments, an investment company he has built and operated for thirty years. He is also expected to announce his successor to the position he held. However, tragedy strikes which leads to his death. This leads to a power struggle within the family, as Sebastian bitter ex-wife Angelique and his ruthless daughter Felicity do whatever it takes to make sure that Sebastian's second wife Dineo doesn't push her playboy son SJ into the ceo position at legacy investment.

Imagine the machiavellian mega-rich characters living dysfunctional lives in the award-winning HBO series Succession in a fresh, distinctly South African context. Add a daily dose of The Bold and The Beautiful, colour the concoction with pure escapism in the topical and aspirational style of the best Brazilian telenovelas, and you have Legacy in a nutshell.

— Jan Du Plessis, director of M-Net channels

== Cast and characters ==
- Dineo Price (Kgomotso Christopher) Sebastian's current wife. She is a kind-hearted woman caught up in the ensuing drama. She is initially disinterested in her husband's wealth and CEO succession, but has a change of heart later in the series.
- Felicity Price (Mary-Ann Barlow) Sebastian and Angèlique's first born daughter. She is the main antagonist in the series who plots with her mother to get the CEO position at Legacy Investments.
- Sebastian Price (Deon Lotz)

The patriarch of the family and businessman. He is the founder and CEO of Legacy Investments.

- Angélique Price (Michelle Botes)

Sebastian's ex-wife and lawyer. She is determined to get Sebastian's wealth. She plots and schemes with her daughter Felicity.

- SJ Price (Anton David Jeftha)

Sebastian and Dineo's handsome and charming son. Petra Potgieter's love interest.

- Petra Potgieter (Trix Vivier)

First jobless when we meet her, Petra Potgieter finds a job and love interest at Legacy Investments due to her brother Stefan's personal ties to one of the Price sisters

- Msizi Zulu (Siyabonga Thwala)

A power-hungry, cunning man who would do anything to become the CEO of legacy investments and be seen as the man on top.

- Stefan Potgieter (Sean-Marco Vorster)

Petra's older brother who works as a driver for the Price family. Dangerous and ambitious, he is Felicity's lover and right-hand man.

- Williem Potgieter (Dawid Minnaar)

Stefan and Petra's dad who is a recovering alcoholic. He tries to protect his children from the powerful Price family.

== Cast ==
| Actor/Actress | Role | Seasons | | | | | | |
| Actor/Actress | Role | Season 1 | Season 2 | Season 3 | Season 4 | Season 5 | Season 6 | Season 7 |
|---|---|---|---|---|---|---|---|---|
| Letoya Makhene | Landiwe Prine-Zwade | Main | Main | Main | Main | Main | Main | Main |
| Zolisa Xaluva | Zwail Prine | Main | Main | Main | Main | Main | Main | Recurring |
| Wiseman Mncube | Shaka Nkosi | Main | Main | Main | Main | Main | Main | Main |
| Mbulelo Grootboom | Bongizwe Zwade | | | | | | | Main |
| Ama Qamata | Buhle Nkosi | Main | Main | Main | Main | Main | Main | Main |
| Seputla Sebogodi | Loyiso Kamanga | Main | Main | Main | Main | Main | Main | Main |
| Siyabonga Thwala | Lebo Segosana | Main | Main | Main | Main | Main | Main | Main |
| Stevel Marc | Martin Van Wyk | Main | Main | Main | Main | Main | Main | Main |
| Renate Stuurman | Tiana Mohamed-Van Wyk | Recurring | Main | Main | Main | Main | Main | Main |
| Tyson Mathonsi | Ndumiso Zwade | | | | | | | Main |
| Moliehi Didie Mokobane | Lerato | Recurring | Recurring | Recurring | Recurring | Recurring | Recurring | Main |
| Thoko Ntshinga | Nomle Ntshaba | | | | | | | Recurring |
| Thandile Kgoroge | Minster Joyce | | | | | | | Recurring |
| Mpho Sibeko | Charile | | | | | | | Recurring |
| Tsholofelo Matshaba | Marina Mukwevho | | Main | Main | Main | Main | Main | Main |
| Jeffery Sekele | Detective Showge Makenzie | Recurring | Recurring | Recurring | Recurring | Recurring | Main | Main |
