= Mary Anne Barlow =

South African actress

- Born: Mary-Anne Barlow; 21 November 1973 (age 52); Salisbury, Rhodesia
- Occupation: Actress
- Years active: 1997–present
- Height: 1.68 m (5 ft 6 in)

Mary Anne Barlow (born 21 November 1973) is a Zimbabwean-South African actress and voice artist. She is best known for her roles in the popular serials Mama Jack, Wild at Heart, Prey and Legacy.

== Personal life ==
She was born on 21 November 1973 in Salisbury, Rhodesia (now Harare, Zimbabwe). She started her Diploma in Dramatic Art and later graduated in 1997.

== Career ==
She performed in the popular theatre play Eskorts in 1997 performed at the Mandy Breytenbach Theatre in Pretoria and The Vagina Monologue Excerpts in 2003. In 2006, she appeared in a lead role on the television serial Shado's. She also played the role of 'Dr. Sam Jones' in the Season 4 of the serial Jacob's Cross.

She is best known for her role as 'Coreen McKenzie Edwards' in the popular television serial Egoli: Place of Gold from 1997 to 2003. She has also appeared in several international television serials such as; role 'Vanessa' in the British television series Wild at Heart since 2009. She made several supportive roles in the films Last Rites of Passage and Cape of Good Hope. In 2004, she made the lead titular role in the film Roxi. Then she starred in the 2005 film Mama Jack, along with Leon Schuster.

She has also acted in several television serials Isidingo, Binnelanders, Ihawu, Roer Jou Voete and Snitch. In 2016, she played the role of 'Margaret Wallace' in the television mini-series Cape Town. From July 2020 to 2022 Barlow starred as the lead role "Felicity Price" in M-Net's first and successful telenovela 'Legacy'.

== Filmography ==
Year	Film	Role	Genre	Ref.
1991	Egoli: Place of Gold	Coreen McKenzie Edwards	TV series	
2004	Snitch	Francine Cullinan	TV series	
2004	Cape of Good Hope	Lisa Van Heern	Film	
2005	Roxi	Roxi / Stepmother	TV movie	
2005	Mama Jack	Angela	Film	
2006	Number 10	Angela	Film	
2007	Prey	Ranger in Radio Room	Film	
2007	The Last Rites of Passage	Tracey	Short film	
2009	Diamonds	Vicky Doyle	TV movie	
2009	The Philanthropist	Interviewer	TV series	
2011	Wild at Heart	Vanessa	TV series	
2011	Winnie Mandela	TRC Reporter	Film	
2015	Sheila	Angela	Short film	
2016	Cape Town	Margaret Wallace	TV mini-series	
2017	Black Sails	Margaret Underhill	TV series	
2017	Thula's Vine	Suzanne	TV series	
2017	Taryn & Sharon	Laurie	TV series	
2018	Farewell Ella Bella	Sarah	Film	
2020	Legacy	Felicity Price	TV series	
2020	Heks	Kelly / Lisa	Film	
2019	The River	Gail Mathabatha	TV series	
