= Norman Anstey =

South African actor and presenter

- Born: Norman Anstey; Johannesburg, South Africa
- Occupations: Actor, singer, voice artist, presenter, MC
- Years active: 1976–present
- Height: 1.86 m (6 ft 1 in)
- Spouse: Penny Anstey
- Children: Amy Anstey; Jay Anstey

Norman Anstey is a South African actor, singer, voice artist, presenter and MC. He is best known for the roles in the television serials such as Black Sails, Heartlines, and Snitch.

== Personal life ==
Norman Anstey was born in Johannesburg, South Africa. He completed his education at several schools including the Rudolf Steiner School in Chambi-sur-Montreux, Switzerland. He studied drama at the De Leon Drama School in Richmond, Surrey, UK. Before starting his drama career, he worked as a tour guide on Dalmatian Coast, then as a shipping clerk at the Automobile Association SA, as an office worker at Die Afrikaanse Pers and as a barman.

He is married to Penny, who was a ballet dancer with the PACT ballet. The couple has two daughters, Amy and Jay, both actresses. His daughter Jay has had several notable roles in the films Sleeper's Wake, Farewell Ella Bella, Tremors: A Cold Day in Hell, and Hell Trip.

== Career ==
He started his theatre career in 1976 with the play Journey's End. Then he appeared in Johannesburg and Pretoria in many theatre productions such as The Deep Blue Sea, Fringe Benefits, Rosencrantz and Guildenstern, The Crucible, The Front Page, Anyone for Denis, Stevie, Ross. Apart from them, he also performed in the musicals such as Evita, The King and I, Fings Aint Wot They Used To Be and The Boys in the Photograph. Before starting television acting, he made extensive appearances in advertisements such as "a clueless cellphone owner" in a series of commercials for Vodacom. In 1987, he had a guest role in the TV1 drama Ballade Vir 'n Enkeling.

His first notable television role came in the M-Net drama series Snitch in 2004, where he played one of the lead roles as Hilton Aimes. In the next year, he reprised this role in the second season. In 2006, he appeared in two television serials as Arnie Katz in the SABC3 drama The Lab and then as Tom Anderson in the SABC2 anthology drama Heartlines. In 2007, he played the role of Arnoldus van der Watt in the SABC2 comedy Andries Plak. In the same year, he joined the kykNET drama Dryfsand and played the role of Dr. Jonker.

In 2008 he played the lead role of Zac's father in the M-Net drama series Innocent Times. Then in 2012, he appeared in the fifth season of popular M-Net drama Jacob's Cross in the role of McKenzie. In 2014, he played the supportive role as Reverend in the first season of the kykNET anthology serial Pandjieswinkelstories. In 2015, he got the opportunity to join the international drama thriller series Black Sails for the second season, where he played the role of Merchant Captain. In 2016, he played Dudi Oz in another kykNET thriller, Fluiters.

In cinema, he appeared in films such as Goodbye Bafana, Dream Forest, Scavengers, The Revenger, Second Skin, Reason To Die, and Rage To Kill.

== Filmography ==
Year	Film	Role	Genre	Ref.
1987	Ballade Vir 'n Enkeling	Guest role	TV series	
1992	Running Wild	Jack Hutton	Film	
2004	Snitch	Hilton Aimes	TV series	
2006	The Lab	Arnie Katz	TV series	
2006	Heartlines	Tom Anderson	TV series	
2007	Andries Plak	Arnoldus van der Watt	TV series	
2007	Goodbye Bafana	Jimmy Kruger	Film	
2007	Dryfsand	Dr. Jonker	TV series	
2008	Innocent Times	Zac's Father	TV series	
2012	Jacob's Cross	McKenzie	TV series	
2014	Pandjieswinkelstories	Reverend	TV series	
2015	Black Sails	Merchant Captain	TV series	
2016	Fluiters	Dudi Oz	TV series	
