= Anton David Jeftha =

South African actor, MC and model

- Born: Anton David Jefta; 1986 (age 39–40); Cape Town, South Africa
- Other name: Anton Jeftha
- Education: University of the Western Cape
- Occupations: Actor, Model, MC, Voice over artist
- Years active: 2009–present
- Height: 1.85 m (6 ft 1 in)

Anton David Jeftha (born 1986) is a South African actor, model, MC and a voice over artist.

== Personal life ==
Jefta was born in 1986 in Cape Town, South Africa. He later grew up in Belhar on the Cape Flats. He graduated from University of the Western Cape with a BCom degree in finance, economics, and information systems, but later did not complete his honors degree in finance. Since 2016, he is living in the United States. He occasionally come to South Africa to visit his family in Durbanville, Western Cape. He has three sisters.

He has been speculated to be dating with rapper Boity Thulo as the two have some time been hinting some romance.

== Career ==
In 2009, he made his acting debut with the short film Pumzi. In 2012, he appeared in the American action series Strike Back as a Mossad agent in an episode "Vengeance: Part 5". In the same year, he made his television debut with the M-Net television series Crimes Uncovered, and played the role of "kidnapper Zubair". Then he acted in the film Mankind: The Story of All of Us and Texas in a Bottle. In 2014, he made a supportive role in the international series Homeland and Dominion. In his modeling career, he became one of the top 14 finalists for Cosmo's sexiest man.

In 2020 he joined with the M-Net telenovela, Legacy, by playing the role as "Sebastian Junior (SJ) Prince". In 2019, he played the role "Rhiyaaz" in the kykNET soap opera Suidooster. Apart from cinema and television, he made some appearances in theatre by performing in the plays Into The Woods (2004), Tannie Dora Foes Bos (2012) and UCB (Impov) (2017).

== Filmography ==
Year	Film	Role	Genre	Ref.
2009	Pumzi	Guard 2	Short film	
2012	Strike Back	Mossad Assassin	TV series	
2012	Mankind: The Story of All of Us	Samoset	TV mini series documentary	
2013	Death Race 3: Inferno	The Jackal	Video	
2013	SAF3	Gabe	TV series	
2014	Homeland	Sergeant Mullen	TV series	
2014	Dominion	Furiad	TV series	
2015	Bagels & Bubbels	Jonathan	TV series	
2015	Saints & Strangers	Pecksuot	TV mini series	
2015	Jamillah and Aladdin	SimSim	TV series	
2018	A Thing of Dreams	Handsome Man	Short film	
2020	Legacy	Sebastian 'SJ' Price	TV series	
2021	Escape Room: Tournament of Champions	Orrie	Film	
TBD	The Contrast	Nate	Film	
2026	One Piece	Kuromarimo	TV series	
