= Sean-Marco Vorster =

South African actor and writer (born 1991)

- Born: Sean-Marco Vorster; 18 September 1991 (age 34); Paarl, South Africa
- Education: Paarl Boys' High
- Alma mater: AFDA, The School for the Creative Economy
- Occupations: Actor, writer, director, assistant director
- Years active: 2011–present
- Height: 1.88 m (6 ft 2 in)
- Spouse: Jay Antsey (m. 2021, sep. 2024)

Sean-Marco Vorster (born 18 September 1991) is a South African actor, producer and director. He is best known for the roles in HBO Max series Warrior 2023 for Steward Gum, and Mnet's Legacy where he played Stefan Potgieter.

== Personal life ==
Vorster was born on 18 September 1991 in Paarl, South Africa. He completed high school at Paarl Boys' High.

He was married to fellow actress Jay Antsey from 2021 to 2024, though the reason for the split is unclear.

== Career ==
In 2012, two weeks after writing his school finals, he made his maiden film appearance on the first Afrikaans horror film, Lyfstraf, directed by Rudi Steyn. In the film, he played the supporting role of Dietmar. In the meantime, he studied acting at the AFDA, The School for the Creative Economy. In the same year, he worked as the assistant director of the short film Nantes. In 2014, he played the lead role as Jaco du Toit, in the SABC1 youth drama series Amaza. After that success, he then acted in the film Die Windpomp, directed by Etienne Fourie in the same year.

In 2014, he joined as a co-presenter of the SABC3 Afrikaans lifestyle and magazine program NAweek. He also had acting appearances in Strikdas, Lea to the Rescue, Susters and Vergeet my nie. In 2020, he joined the original cast of the M-Net soap Legacy, playing the role of Stefan Potgieter. He also owns a production company, where he is working in Nigeria, Kenya, Tanzania and Congo on directing advertisements.

== Filmography ==
Year	Film	Role	Genre	Ref.
2012	Lyfstraf	Dietmar	Film	
2012	Nantes	Assistant director	Short film	
2014	Amaza	Jaco du Toit	TV series	
2014	Die Windpomp	Pieter	Film	
2015	Strikdas	AJ Blignaut	Film	
2015	Jan Umkhwetha	Jan - 30	Short film	
2016	Lea to the Rescue	Crony	Film	
2018	Susters	Frans	Film	
2019	Alles Malan	Nico	TV series	
2020	Vergeet my nie	Hugo Derks	Film	
2020	Legacy	Stefan Potgieter	TV series	
