= 徹 =

徹 may refer to:

- Che, a masculine Chinese given name
- Cheh, a masculine Chinese given name
- Tetsu, a masculine Japanese given name
- Tōru, a masculine Japanese given name

== See also ==
- Che (disambiguation)
- Toru (disambiguation)
