= Che =

Che, Ché, Chè or CHE may refer to:

== People ==
- Che (name)
  - Che Guevara (1928–1967), Argentine Marxist revolutionary
- Che (surname) (車;车), Chinese surname
  - Michael Che (born 1983), American comedian, actor, and writer
- Che (rapper) (born 2006), American rapper
- C. H. E. Blackmann (1835–1912), architect in Australia

== Arts and entertainment ==
- Che! a 1969 film by Richard Fleischer about Che Guevara
- What? (film) or Che? a 1972 film by Roman Polanski
- Ché Trading, a UK independent record label
- Che (2008 film), a 2008 film directed by Steven Soderbergh starring Benicio del Toro
- Che (2014 film), a 2014 Persian film
- Ché (band), American stoner rock band
- Che, the narrator in Andrew Lloyd Webber's musical Evita
- Che, from the television show The O.C.
- Che (TV channel), a Russian television channel
- "Che", song by Suicide from the album Suicide

== Education ==
- Centre for Higher Education, German organization dedicated to higher education reform
- Cherry Hill High School East, a public high school in Cherry Hill, New Jersey
- Christelijke Hogeschool Ede, a Dutch Christian vocational university
- UPLB College of Human Ecology, in the Philippines

== Language ==
- Che (Cyrillic), a letter of the Cyrillic alphabet
- Che (Persian), a letter of the Persian alphabet
- Che (Armenian letter), a letter of the Armenian alphabet
- Che (Spanish), a Spanish interjection
- Che language
- Chechen language (ISO 639: che)

== Country, station, and currency codes ==
- CHE currency code by ISO 4217, a Swiss WIR Bank fund
- Cheam railway station (station code: CHE), England National Rail station
- Chestwood stop (MTR station code: CHE), Tin Shui Wai, Hong Kong
- The ISO 3166-1 alpha-3 international country code for Switzerland
- Zhejiang, a Chinese province

== Sports ==
- Chelsea F.C. (Che)
- Valencia CF or "Los Che", a Spanish football club
- Ruca Che, an Argentine indoor arena and multi-purpose stadium in Neuquén, Patagonia

== Other uses ==
- Chè, a sweet dessert soup or pudding in Vietnamese cuisine
- ARC Centre of Excellence for the History of Emotions
- Campaign for Homosexual Equality
- Certified health executive, a professional health leadership designation in Canada
- Certified Hospitality Educator, a certification awarded by the American Hotel & Lodging Educational Institute
- Chemical engineering (ChE)
- Cholinesterase (ChE), a family of enzymes
- Che Sudaka, a band from Barcelona, Spain
- The Chronicle of Higher Education, an American periodical
- Container Handling Equipment, machinery used in containerization
- District health board, previously Crown Health Enterprise, in New Zealand
- Maclura tricuspidata or Che, a fruit-bearing tree
- Che (cigarette)

== See also ==
- Shay (disambiguation)
- Shea (disambiguation)
- 徹 (disambiguation)
