= 亨 =

亨, meaning 'smoothly', may refer to:

- Heng, a Chinese given name for Chinese politician Henry Hsu (1912–2009)
- Tōru, a masculine Japanese given name

== See also ==
- Heng (disambiguation)
- Toru (disambiguation)
