= Heng =

Heng may refer to:

== Name ==
- Heng (surname), a surname from Southeast Asia
- HENG abbreviation from "Hydrogen Enriched Natural Gas", see hydrogen compressed natural gas
- Heng, one of deities Heng and Ha

== Letters ==
- Heng (letter), an uncommon letter of the Latin alphabet combining ⟨h⟩ and the lower right hook from ⟨ŋ⟩
- Heng (Cyrillic), a rare letter of the Cyrillic alphabet
- Heng (stroke), the horizontal stroke ⟨一⟩ used in writing Chinese characters

== Places ==
- Heng (Rogaland), an island in Strand municipality, Rogaland county, Norway
- Heng County, in Guangxi, China
- Mount Heng (Hunan), mount in Hunan, China
- Mount Heng (Shanxi), mount in Shanxi, China

== Other ==
- Nu Centauri, a star also named Heng
- 亨 (disambiguation)
