= List of Fruits Basket chapters =

The cover of the first Japanese volume of the Fruits Basket manga, featuring Tohru Honda

This is a complete list of chapters for the manga series Fruits Basket. Written and illustrated by Natsuki Takaya, Fruits Basket is one of the best selling shōjo manga of all time, with 30 million copies in print worldwide. The first chapter premiered in July 1998 in Hana to Yume magazine, where it was serialized until its conclusion in November 2006. The series focuses on Tohru Honda, an orphan girl who, after meeting Yuki, Kyo, and Shigure Sohma, learns that thirteen members of the Sohma family are possessed by the animals of the Chinese zodiac legend and are cursed to turn into their animal forms if they are embraced by anyone of the opposite sex or their bodies come under a great deal of stress. As the series progresses, Tohru meets the rest of the zodiac as well as the family's mysterious head, Akito Sohma, and eventually resolves to break the curse that burdens them.

The 136 untitled chapters were collected and published in 23 tankōbon volumes by Hakusensha starting on January 19, 1999; the last volume was released on March 19, 2007. Hakusensha reprinted the series in twelve aizōban (collector's edition) volumes under the Hana to Yume Comics Special imprint from September 4, 2015, to July 20, 2016. The collector's edition features new cover artwork by Natsuki Takaya, as well as color pages from the manga's original magazine serialization. Hakusensha also published the first three chapters of the series in a dual Japanese-English edition in November 2003. A full-color version of the manga was released in digital-only format in Japan in March 2019.

Fruits Basket was originally licensed for an English-language release in North America and the United Kingdom by Tokyopop and in Singapore by Chuang Yi. The Singapore edition was licensed for import to Australia and New Zealand by Madman Entertainment. All 23 volumes were released in both North America and Singapore. In October 2007, Tokyopop released a box set containing the first four volumes. It later began re-releasing the earlier volumes in omnibus Ultimate Editions that combined two sequential volumes in a single larger hardbound volume with new cover art. Six Ultimate Editions were released, covering the first twelve tankōbon volumes of the series. In 2011, Tokyopop closed its North American publishing division, and its licensed titles reverted to their original owners. Chuang Yi ceased operations a few years later. In 2015, Yen Press licensed the series for an updated English-language release, published in twelve omnibus editions in North America and the United Kingdom. The manga series is also licensed for regional language releases by Delcourt in France, Norma Editorial in Spain, Dynit in Italy, Carlsen Comics in Denmark, Germany and Sweden, Glénat in Benelux, Waneko in Poland, Sangatsu Manga in Finland, and by Comix-ART in Russia. In Latin America, Editorial Vid initially licensed the series for Spanish release in Mexico, with Panini taking over the license in Mexico later. Editorial Ivrea licensed the series for Spanish release in Argentina, and Editora JBC licensed it for release in Portuguese in Brazil. In Asia, Tong Li Publishing is currently the licensor of the series in Taiwan, Sparkle Roll licensed it in Hong Kong, and Seoul Cultural Publishers licensed it in South Korea. Chuang Yi also published a Simplified Chinese edition in Singapore.

On 4 September 2015, a new series, Fruits Basket Another (フルーツバスケットanother, Furūtsu Basuketto Anazā), began serialization in HanaLaLaOnline. In August 2017, it was transferred to Manga Park. Originally, it was announced that Fruits Basket another would be finished on 3 December 2018, however, in March 2020, it was announced that the series would return with "chapter 13" (split in three parts) on 20 April 2020 (originally scheduled for 6 April). The second part of "chapter 13" was published on 4 May 2020 and the third part of "chapter 13" was published in September 2020, and Takaya announced that this would be "tentatively" the last chapter of the manga. The first collected volume was published on 19 August 2016. The series finished with its fourth volume, released on 18 February 2022. In November 2017, Yen Press announced the acquisition of the manga.

A 3-chapter series, titled Fruits Basket: Three Musketeers Arc (フルーツバスケット：マブダチ特別編, Furūtsu Basuketto Mabudachi Tokubetsu-hen) was published in Hana to Yume on 20 April 5 June and 5 July 2019. A "2nd season" began on 20 April 2020. The second chapter was published on 20 June. The third and final chapter was published on 5 August 2020. The chapters were collected in the fourth volume of Fruits Basket Another. Yen Press digitally simulpublished the series. The chapters were published on 23 April 6 June and 9 July 2019. The first chapter of Fruits Basket: The Three Musketeers Arc 2 was published on 28 April 2020. The second chapter was published on 22 June 2020. The third chapter was published on 5 August 2020.

== Volume list ==
=== Fruits Basket ===
No.	Original release date	Original ISBN	English (Singapore / North America) release date	English (Singapore / North America) ISBN
1	January 19, 1999	978-4-592-17161-4	February 10, 2004 (TP); February 10, 2005 (CY); June 28, 2016 (YP)	978-1-59182-603-3 (TP); 978-981-260-200-8 (CY); 978-0-316-36016-6 (YP)
Chapters 1–6
Recently orphaned high school student Tohru Honda is living in the woods while her grandfather's house is being renovated when she is discovered by Yuki Sohma, a popular but distant boy in her class, who lives nearby. When a landslide buries her tent, Yuki and his older cousin Shigure Sohma, with whom he lives, ask her to stay with them in return for housekeeping instead of rent. As she settles into her room, cousin Kyo Sohma bursts in, spoiling for a fight with his rival, Yuki. In the confusion, Tohru accidentally catches hold of Kyo, Yuki, and Shigure, and turns them into a Cat (Kyo), Rat (Yuki), and Dog (Shigure). They explain the curse of the zodiac and warn her that the head of the family, Akito Sohma, would have her memories erased if she reveals the secret. Tohru promises to keep it, but asks Yuki to remain her friend if she is made to forget him. Under Akito's orders, Kyo also moves in, with some initial awkwardness, and he transfers into Tohru and Yuki's class. When she learns where Kyo is living, Kagura Sohma, a cousin obsessed with him, visits. After some weeks, Tohru's grandfather's house is complete and she moves back in with him, but she misses the Sohmas and, as a dependent orphan, is made to feel awkward by her aunt and uncle, so when Yuki and Kyo come to fetch her "home," she willingly returns with them.
2	June 18, 1999	978-4-592-17162-1	April 13, 2004 (TP); February 10, 2005 (CY); June 28, 2016 (YP)	978-1-59182-604-0 (TP); 978-981-260-303-6 (CY); 978-0-316-36016-6 (YP)
Chapters 7–12
When Tohru's friends, Arisa Uotani and Saki Hanajima, learn of her living arrangements, they inspect them by way of a sleep-over before grudgingly approving. During the night, Tohru tells her friends about how once she got lost as a child and was led home by a boy who gave her his cap, which she now treasures. At her job as an office janitor, Tohru meets a beautiful, enthusiastic, German-speaking boy who turns out to be Momiji Sohma, whose father owns the building. To promote their onigiri booth in the school cultural festival, the class convinces Yuki to wear a dress and, to his embarrassment, Momiji and Hatori Sohma, the family doctor, see him in it. When Momiji hugs Tohru, however, he transforms into the Rabbit and the secret is nearly exposed, until Yuki distracts his classmates. Hatori asks Tohru to visit him at the main Sohma estate, to her trepidation, as he is the Sohma who can suppress memories. He warns her that the Sohmas and their curse are dangerous to know: when Akito violently disapproved of Hatori's engagement to an outsider, Hatori ultimately had to suppress his fiancee's memory of their engagement. At New Years, under Hanajima's prompting, Yuki and Kyo refuse to attend the obligatory banquet because that would leave Tohru alone. When Hatori meets Tohru again, she coincidentally repeats something his former fiancee said and he decides that no matter how cold winter is, "someday the snow will melt" around her.
3	September 17, 1999	978-4-592-17163-8	June 8, 2004 (TP); February 10, 2005 (CY); June 28, 2016 (YP)	978-1-59182-605-7 (TP); 978-981-260-304-3 (CY); 978-0-316-36018-0 (YP)
Chapters 13–18
As Yuki and Kyo race each other during a long-distance run for P.E., cousin Hatsuharu Sohma stops them to challenge Kyo to a fight. During the battle, Yuki has a bronchial attack, and Hatsuharu uses Tohru to transform into an Ox to carry Yuki home. He tells Tohru that Yuki and Kyo have changed, in that they fight less viciously and Yuki now smiles. For Valentine's Day, Kagura forces Kyo to go on a date, which Shigure turns into a double-date with Yuki and Tohru, to Kyo's intense annoyance. Tohru tells Kyo that while she wishes he and Yuki got along, it is okay to hate his rival. When Shigure delivers Tohru's Valentine's Day chocolate to Hatori, he accuses Shigure of using Tohru as a pawn, without concern for whether she gets hurt. For White Day, Momiji gives Tohru a trip to the Sohma onsen, and to please her Yuki and Kyo go along. While there, Tohru meets the hostess of the onsen, who is the mother of Ritsu Sohma, another zodiac member. When Tohru makes an attempt to play table tennis, Yuki laughs for the first time in a long time. That night, Yuki gives Tohru a hair ribbon as his return gift. On the way home, Tohru is surprised to find out that Momiji is the same age as Hatsuharu (just one year younger).
4	January 19, 2000	978-4-592-17164-5	August 10, 2004 (TP); April 13, 2005 (CY); June 28, 2016 (YP)	978-1-59182-606-4 (TP); 978-981-260-318-0 (CY); 978-0-316-36018-0 (YP)
Chapters 19–24
When Momiji and Hatsuharu start at Tohru's high school as first-year students, Akito attends the opening ceremony and introduces himself to Tohru, praising her. When he threatens Yuki with punishment for skipping the New Year's banquet, Tohru interrupts on the excuse that class is starting; Akito later calls her "ugly," but is pleased that Yuki is still afraid of him. When Yuki's older brother, Ayame Sohma, visits Shigure's house, he admits to Tohru he regrets completely ignoring his little brother when they were younger. Ayame tells stories of when he, Shigure, and Hatori were students at Tohru's school, and of his term as student council president. Tohru meets Momiji's mother and little sister at work, and learns the former voluntarily had her memory suppressed (that Momiji was her son), because she could not cope with the zodiac curse. On the first anniversary of the death of Tohru's mother, Kyoko Honda, Tohru, Hanajima, and Uotani visit her grave, accompanied by Yuki and Kyo. While there, Hanajima tells Kyo she can "sense" his regret, and when he later sees Tohru sleeping on the porch, he tells her he is sorry.
5	April 19, 2000	978-4-592-17165-2	October 12, 2004 (TP); May 25, 2005 (CY); July 26, 2016 (YP)	978-1-59182-607-1 (TP); 978-981-260-412-5 (CY); 978-0-316-36064-7 (YP)
Chapters 25–30
For Golden Week, Shigure and Hatori take the household to a Sohma summer house in the mountains. Thinking Kyo and Yuki's preoccupation since visiting her mother's grave is somehow her fault, Tohru apologizes to them, just before they all fall off a path; in the ensuing bickering, she laughs to see them back to normal. Ayame visits the summer house, and offers to show Hatori the wedding photos of his former fiancee, Kana, but Hatori declines, saying he is past her. Back from vacation, Tohru and Yuki meet Hatsuharu holding a small Tiger: Kisa Sohma, who had disappeared from home. Kisa stopped speaking shortly after entering middle school, because her classmates were teasing her for her orange hair (an effect of the curse). Yuki is upset, because he too once withdrew from the world, but Tohru tells Kisa's mother that Kisa did not tell her what was happening is because victims of bullying feel guilty, as she knows from experience. Because Tohru understands, Kisa stays with her for several days until she begins to speak again. Seeing Kisa face her fears and return to school, Yuki resolves to face his own fears of not being good enough and agrees to become the next student council president. Meanwhile, his fan club visits Hanajima in an attempt to find a weakness in someone who protects Tohru, whom they resent for being close to "Prince Yuki." When Tohru has to take a make-up test and falls ill with a cold, she feels she has failed her mother until Kyo cheers her up.
6	August 18, 2000	978-4-592-17166-9	December 14, 2004 (TP); May 25, 2005 (CY); July 26, 2016 (YP)	978-1-59182-608-8 (TP); 978-981-260-413-2 (CY); 978-0-316-36064-7 (YP)
Chapters 31–36 (Note: In volume 6 of the Tokyopop edition, the table of contents omits Chapter 35 and misnumbers Chapter 36 as Chapter 35.)
Kagura visits Kyo and asks him whether Tohru knows about his secret yet—his true form. Kazuma Sohma, who had raised Kyo since his mother was killed in an accident (rumored to be suicide over her cursed son), returns from his journey. However, he refuses to take Kyo back, because he believes living with Tohru has helped open Kyo up, which Kyo angrily denies. To force the issue, in front of Tohru, Kazuma takes off Kyo's bracelet that prevents his "true form" from appearing: a fearsome, foul-smelling monster. Kyo runs off, but Tohru follows him despite her fear and nausea—an act seen from the house by Kagura, Yuki, and Shigure. When Tohru finds Kyo, he violently pushes her away to avoid the pain of being rejected for his own self, but she refuses to leave her friend until he accepts that she accepts him, and eventually she returns to the house holding him in cat form. Yuki is troubled by these events, but will not tell Tohru what bothers him, and she worries about it until he tells her that one day he will be ready to explain everything. Later, Yuki visits Ayame's shop with Tohru and discovers that his older brother runs a high-end cosplay boutique. Ayame's seamstress Mine dresses Tohru in one of their outfits for Yuki to see.
7	August 17, 2001	978-4-592-17167-6	February 8, 2005 (TP); July 29, 2005 (CY); August 30, 2016 (YP)	978-1-59532-402-3 (TP); 978-981-260-603-7 (CY); 978-0-316-36065-4 (YP)
Chapters 37–42
After Kisa sleeps over with Tohru, a jealous and smart-aleck Hiro Sohma confronts Tohru and steals her mother's picture. With Momiji and Kyo's help, Tohru recovers it, and Kisa makes Hiro apologize. Kisa realizes that Hiro, who had been growing more distant, does like her and is just awkward about his feelings. Hatori tells Shigure that when Hiro told Akito he likes Kisa, Akito beat Kisa badly, and Shigure says that one day Akito will pay for his mistakes. During a trip to a park with Kisa, Hiro admits to Tohru that he wants to grow up faster so he can protect Kisa, and Tohru tells him she admires anyone who knows they still need to mature. When Hanajima and Uotani realize Tohru still wears her middle-school swimsuit, they make Kyo and Yuki help shop and pay for a new one. While shopping, Uotani tells the boys how she met Tohru and Kyoko and became friends with them. When three younger gang-members confront Uotani, she blows them off, and in a flashback remembers how Kyoko helped her leave her gang and go straight. Yuki's fan club tries to find out who will be on the next year's student council with him, in order to protect him from any girls, but fail. Two students (whose faces are not shown) talk about the dangers working with Yuki in the coming year, given his rabid fans, and one expresses interest in Tohru.
8	January 18, 2002	978-4-592-17168-3	April 12, 2005 (TP); July 29, 2005 (CY); August 30, 2016 (YP)	978-1-59532-403-0 (TP); 978-981-260-603-7 (CY); 978-0-316-36065-4 (YP)
Chapters 43–48
At school, Hatsuharu wrecks a classroom. Afterward, he tells Yuki he is down because he was dumped by a member of the zodiac, whom he does not name, while she was hospitalized by injuries. Tohru meets the beautiful but unstable Ritsu Sohma and tells him his mother (see volume 3) is not ashamed of him; when he expresses anxiety over his uselessness, Tohru says her mother told her some people have to find their reason for living in someone else. Hatsuharu tells Yuki that while he is still troubled, he has not given up on Rin. With parent-teacher conferences coming up, Tohru and friends think about their plans for the future—a touchy subject for the Sohmas, especially Kyo, because the curse limits them. Ayame offers to attend Yuki's conference in place of their parents, but Yuki says he no longer wants to run away from them. Tohru and the younger Sohmas celebrate the start of summer vacation by visiting a haunted attraction and make plans to stay at the Sohma beach house. Hiro visits Rin Sohma in the hospital, and she tells him she will not "give up" although Shigure is all she has left.
9	June 19, 2002	978-4-592-17169-0	June 7, 2005 (TP); August 31, 2005 (CY); September 27, 2016 (YP)	978-1-59532-404-7 (TP); 978-981-260-669-3 (CY); 978-0-316-36066-1 (YP)
Chapters 49–53; Bonus Chapter: "Rain Shelter of Terror"
New president Yuki finds the student council room trashed, with a girl kneeling among the papers. She is Machi Kuragi, student council treasurer for the next year, and with her is the energetic new vice president, Kakeru Manabe, who wants to turn the student council into a super-sentai–style School Defense Force. When Yuki complains about them to Tohru, she says the next year will be a fun challenge for him. Uotani tells Tohru and Hanajima about a man she met (and liked) at her job in a convenience store. While on break Uotani meets the man again, and he takes her out to lunch and almost kisses her. As she later wonders whether she will see him again, the man is shown arriving at a house where Akito greets him as Kureno. A flashback shows Hanajima's difficult childhood with a psychic power she cannot control, one she believes she used to nearly kill a boy who tormented her. When she is forced to transfer to a new middle school, she meets Tohru and Uotani and learns to open up to others and trust that she will not hurt them, and so learns to control her abilities. Kyo's father insists that Kazuma help confine his monstrous son after he graduates, but Kazuma rebuffs him, saying the father resembles how Kyo was before he started growing past despair. While helping Tohru with her summer homework, Yuki asks about the cap she treasures (see volume 2). Rin, now out of the hospital, visits Shigure to ask a question. In a bonus story, while the friends wait at school for a rain shower to end, Hatsuharu tells a scary story he read in one of Shigure's books.
10	October 18, 2002	978-4-592-17170-6	July 12, 2005 (TP); August 31, 2005 (CY); September 27, 2016 (YP)	978-1-59532-405-4 (TP); 978-981-260-699-0 (CY); 978-0-316-36066-1 (YP)
Chapters 54–59
While Tohru and the younger Sohmas have fun at the Sohma beach house, Shigure provokes Akito into visiting them. After thinking about Tohru's cap and his childhood, when he was confined by Akito, Yuki tells Tohru there is something he needs to tell her but is not yet ready to. When Hiro is jealous of Tohru, Hatsuharu points out that when he lashes out at her it makes Kisa nervous, which only irritates Hiro more. Before going to the beach house, Shigure visits the bookshop where his ex-girlfriend, Mayuko Shiraki, helps out, and she remembers in flashback her best friend's (Kana) former engagement to Hatori. Shigure asks Mayuko about her secret crush on Hatori and then manipulates Hatori into meeting her, during which meeting she admits she still likes him. Akito arrives at the beach and stays in a separate house, where he has all the zodiac animals but the cat attend him. Akito tells Yuki not to get foolish ideas, such as thinking he might escape, and in response Shigure tells Hatori that Yuki is no longer what Akito believes. When Yuki meets Tohru afterwards, he mentions again that his "lid is slowly opening," kisses her forehead, and admits to himself, but not to her, that he deeply cares for her.
11	February 19, 2003	978-4-592-17881-1	August 9, 2005 (TP); November 7, 2005 (CY); October 25, 2016 (YP)	978-1-59532-406-1 (TP); 978-981-260-746-1 (CY); 978-0-316-36071-5 (YP)
Chapters 60–65
Akito continues to keep the zodiac with him during the days. Hatori tells Kyo not to leave Tohru alone, and Yuki warns Kyo not to lose it if he meets Akito because Tohru might get hurt. The next day, Akito takes Kureno to see Tohru, saying she needs to learn she is no match for himself, but when he sees Kyo having fun on the beach with her, Akito decides the cat needs to be given a lesson first. Later, Tohru finds a Horse in the yard, whom Yuki introduces as Isuzu "Rin" Sohma. When Rin returns to human form, she threatens to kill Yuki if he tells anyone she is there. Now that Tohru has met eleven of the twelve zodiac animals, she wonders whether Akito is the remaining Rooster. Akito summons Kyo and asks whether he is succeeding in their bet—to beat Yuki in a fight by the end of high school or be confined for the rest of his life—and taunts him with being a monster who drove his mother to suicide. Kyo realizes he is glad Tohru did not run away when she saw his true form because he loves her, but to protect her denies this to Akito. Kyo vows to spend as much of his time "outside" as he can with her. She is the "hope" that Kazuma promised would come to him. Later that night, after a call to return to the main Sohma estate, Akito goes to see Tohru before leaving. When Momiji tries to stop Akito from entering the beach house, Akito beats him until Tohru steps in to protect him. Akito tells her to stop interfering, warns her of Kyo's coming confinement, and explains that Kureno, not himself, is the Rooster—for he is the god of the zodiac. Tohru, wanting to protect her friends, resolves to break the zodiac curse.
12	June 19, 2003	978-4-592-17882-8	December 13, 2005 (TP); November 23, 2005 (CY); October 25, 2016 (YP)	978-1-59532-407-8 (TP); 978-981-260-768-3 (CY); 978-0-316-36071-5 (YP)
Chapters 66–71
After summer break, Yuki meets the rest of his student council: secretaries Kimi Toudou and Naohito Sakuragi. Tohru visits Kazuma and asks if he knows how to break the curse. Kazuma explains that because of their "bond of blood," it is hard for any of the zodiac to resist Akito, and admits he does not know how to break it. After Rin sees Tohru leave, Kazuma tells her Tohru asked him the same question she had. When Kyo tries to talk to Kagura, she insists they go on a date before she will listen. She takes him to the place where she first saw his true form and admits that she has clung to him because, compared to the cat, she has it easy—that her love is based on pity (that she could compensate for running away from Kyo's true form). Kyo tells her he cannot love her back, and she gives up on him, though she still loves him. Because Hatsuharu is still down about Rin, Yuki tries to talk her, but she tells him to mind his own business. Hatsuharu overhears this and tells Rin that without her, he does not mind if he dies and they kiss. Hatsuharu thinks she's unable to recover on her own, and Rin runs away. When Tohru's grandfather throws out his back, Shigure takes his place for Tohru's parent-teacher conference; not knowing that he once dated her teacher, Mayuko, Tohru is startled by the cold atmosphere when they meet. Tohru tells Mayuko she plans to get a job after high school. After the conference, Shigure tells Mayuko to see Hatori. At his conference, Kyo is unable to give any plans for the future, because he does not know what will happen when he graduates.
13	November 19, 2003	978-4-592-17883-5	April 11, 2006 (TP); December 7, 2005 (CY); November 22, 2016 (YP)	978-1-59532-408-5 (TP); 978-981-260-789-8 (CY); 978-0-316-36072-2 (YP)
Chapters 72–77
When Yuki meets his mother at his parent-teacher conference, he remembers how his parents "gave" him to Akito to advance their position among the Sohmas. His mother's attempt to dictate his future is broken up by Ayame's flamboyant arrival, which gives Yuki the strength to tell her he will decide his own path. When Kakeru probes Yuki about his relationship with Tohru, Yuki reacts as if Kakeru were his mother and they argue, but when they apologize afterward Yuki decides that being around Kakeru may not be bad for him. When Tohru learns that the man Uotani pines after is named Kureno, she wonders if it is Kureno Sohma and visits the Sohma estate to find out. She meets Momiji's little sister Momo, who shows Tohru the secret way inside she has been using to listen to Momiji's violin playing without knowing he is her brother. Momiji tells Tohru where Kureno lives, apart from the rest of the zodiac, but she gets lost and meets a person whose voice sounds like Akito's. Kureno rescues her from discovery but tells Tohru he has no intention of seeing Uotani again. That evening, Tohru is disheartened and Kyo comforts her. During the class trip to Kyoto, a girl confesses to Kyo that she likes him but he rejects her, and Tohru wonders if she will one day be pushed away as well. But he asks if she wants to kill time with him as other classmates are purchasing souvenirs. Hanajima tells Tohru she thinks the two of them have met Kakeru before. When Kakeru again asks Yuki about Tohru, Yuki asks about his interest and warns Kakeru not to hurt her. When they return to school, Yuki gives Machi a red maple leaf as a souvenir. Tohru finishes creating her souvenir of the zodiac set and Kyo is surprised to see the cat among the collection.
14	April 19, 2004	978-4-592-17884-2	August 8, 2006 (TP); February 15, 2006 (CY); November 22, 2016 (YP)	978-1-59532-409-2 (TP); 978-981-260-887-1 (CY); 978-0-316-36072-2 (YP)
Chapters 78–83
Rin recalls what she asked Shigure in volume 9: how to break the zodiac curse. He denied knowing, but she returns to ask again and collapses in the living room, where Tohru finds her. In a flashback, Rin remembers how her parents tried to pretend to be a happy family till the strain of living with the curse broke them, and Rin had to move out. She became friend, and later lover, of Hatsuharu despite not wanting to depend on his support. When Akito found out, she took the blame for seducing him and in punishment, Akito pushed her out a window, after which she broke up with Hatsuharu to protect him. Rin comes to in the present in a bed, being watched over by Tohru. Rin tells Tohru she hates kind people because they get taken advantage of by people like her. Tohru realizes Rin is also trying to break the curse and refuses to stop her own efforts, despite Rin's despair. Then Rin jumps through the window and starts crying, Tohru comes alone and comforts her. After that Hatori comes and takes Rin to the hospital after her not wanting to. At school the next day Hatsuharu talks with Yuki about he visiting Rin to the hospital, even though she try to hit him he sees her better which makes feel better. When Machi trashes the student council room again, and Kakeru asks Yuki to overlook it, Kakeru tells Yuki that Machi is his younger half-sister, and until recently their two mothers fought over who is the family heir, a battle that still affects Machi. Tohru visits Rin in the hospital and they exchange what they know about the curse; when Rin asks what is most important to Tohru, she cannot answer. That night, Tohru dreams of the last time she saw her mother. For the upcoming class production of Cinderella for the school culture festival, Yuki's fan club has Tohru cast as the wicked stepsister to make her look mean-spirited in front of him. When Yuki is accidentally locked in a storage closet, he has a panic attack, and memories of Akito make him realize that he sees Tohru as a mother-figure.
15	September 17, 2004	978-4-592-17885-9	December 12, 2006 (TP); March 15, 2006 (CY); December 20, 2016 (YP)	978-1-59816-023-9 (TP); 978-981-4204-15-6 (CY); 978-0-316-36073-9 (YP)
Chapters 84–89
While recovering from his panic attack, Yuki tells Kakeru about his relationship with Tohru. In a flashback, Yuki remembers his childhood under Akito's control, believing he was despised by the rest of the zodiac. When Yuki sought out Kyo, as the similarly despised cat, Kyo scorned him as the Rat that tricked the original cat. In the depth of his despair, he ran away; while outside, he helped a lost girl, Tohru, return home (giving her the treasured cap as he did so), which gave him proof that he was not as useless as Akito claimed. In the present, Yuki admits to Kakeru that what he wants from Tohru is the unconditional, nurturing love of "a mother," not the love of a woman, and yet despite this he is jealous of the growing attraction of Tohru and Kyo. Meanwhile, during rehearsals for Cinderella, their class realizes that their leads are miscast, with Kyo incapable of being charming as a prince, nor Tohru wicked as a stepsister, nor Hanajima a downtrodden Cinderella. The play is rewritten as Sorta Cinderella and the performance is successful, despite personal, out-of-character outbursts by Tohru, Kyo, and Uotani. At Tohru's request, Momiji makes a copy of the play's video for Kureno, so that he can see Uotani's outcry that he come see her. Meanwhile, Yuki sees some girls bullying Machi for saying that Yuki is not a prince, which she counters by saying she believes that Yuki is lonely in spite of being surrounded by others. Before anything else can happen, Kakeru comes to save her. Meanwhile, Kyo begins to wonder if Tohru is starting to like him, but he brushes off that thought.
16	January 19, 2005	978-4-592-17886-6	April 10, 2007 (TP); May 17, 2006 (CY); December 20, 2016 (YP)	978-1-59816-024-6 (TP); 978-981-4204-22-4 (CY); 978-0-316-36073-9 (YP)
Chapters 90–95
Conflicted over his growing feelings for Tohru because of the approaching deadline for his confinement, Kyo also feels guilty for not telling her he knew her mother. In a long flashback, he remembers when he was a boy, Kyoko told him about her past as a gang member, her meeting Katsuya Honda as a student teacher at her middle school, and falling in love with and marrying him; how she gave birth to their daughter, whom Katsuya loved; how he died of pneumonia on a business trip, and in her grief she nearly killed herself before remembering that her toddler daughter needed her; and how she concluded that we all need to be needed. The flashback turns into a dream in which the bloody bodies of Kyoko and his mother argue over Kyo's fate, and when he wakes in the present, he resolves to keep Tohru at a distance. After finishing all the work of the year the student counsel decide to celebrate by going out to dinner. On the way to the restaurant, Yuki meets Machi. She falls down and her things are thrown on the floor; among them Yuki finds a gift he gave to her, which makes her blush and have a brief fight. At New Year, Tohru and Kyo stay with Kazuma and are surprised to find out Rin is staying too and that she has decided not to go to the celebration. At the New Year's zodiac banquet, when Akito tells Yuki he forgives his past transgressions, Yuki first tells Akito he forgives him, then retracts that as it implies blame. Akito strikes Yuki with a bottle before storming off. Tohru asks Kyo what his New Year's wish would be this year, but he asks her to reveal hers as well in order to be fair. However, her wish is to break the curse, which she doesn't want him to know.
17	May 19, 2005	978-4-592-17887-3	August 7, 2007 (TP); June 21, 2006 (CY); January 24, 2017 (YP)	978-1-59816-799-3 (TP); 978-981-4204-73-6 (CY); 978-0-316-50162-0 (YP)
Chapters 96–101
Kureno watches the video of Sorta Cinderella and calls Tohru. She is not home but Shigure agrees to arrange a meeting, then asks Kureno if he has been released from the curse. When Tohru meets Kureno, she realizes that birds fly away from him, and he admits, while embracing her, that he has not been the Rooster since his mid-teens, though he does not know why the curse was broken for him. Kureno again declines to see Uotani, even though he wants to, because when Akito was distressed at his curse's lifting, he promised "that sad little girl" he would never leave. He reveals what only the four oldest zodiac members know: that Akito was born female, but raised male on the orders of her mother, Ren Sohma. Hanajima senses Tohru's distress at these revelations and takes her home overnight, where Tohru tells Uotani only that Kureno is promised to another woman. Tohru recovers but remains confused, not knowing whom she can talk to about what she knows, and when she asks Kyo about hypothetically breaking the curse, he derides it as a vain hope. While having a business dinner with his editor, Shigure sees Akito but does not greet her. The rest of Shigure and Kureno's telephone conversation is shown in flashback, in which they mutually reproach each other over Akito. When Shigure visits Akito later that night, Shigure repeats his long-ago promise to never leave Akito, and admits he once had sex with Ren in retaliation for Akito's sleeping with Kureno, and the argument ends with them sleeping together.
18	September 16, 2005	978-4-592-17888-0	November 23, 2007 (TP); July 26, 2006 (CY); January 24, 2017 (YP)	978-1-59816-862-4 (TP); 978-981-269-049-4 (CY); 978-0-316-50162-0 (YP)
Chapters 102–107
Yuki realizes Machi cannot stand orderliness, because of the pressure to be perfect when her mother was competing with Kakeru's. At the next student council meeting, he breaks a piece in a new box of chalk, so that she does not have to wreck it. On her graduation day, the president of Yuki's fan club confesses her feelings to him and wishes him happiness. Tohru decides to talk to Rin about Kureno and the curse, but cannot find her—nor can anyone else. Hiro apologizes to Kisa for admitting to Akito he liked her, leading to Akito beating her up, and tells Hatsuharu he witnessed Akito pushing Rin out a window, the first time she was hospitalized. Hatsuharu realizes Rin broke up with him to protect him. During this conversation, Kureno is shown finding Rin confined in the cat's room. Hatsuharu angrily confronts Akito, who first denies any knowledge. When Kureno tells them Rin has been sent to the hospital, Akito denies it was wrong because Rin, as a zodiac animal, had defied him. Dreaming in the hospital, Rin remembers Ren Sohma promising to tell her how to break the curse if she stole a black box from Akito, but Akito caught Rin in the act and imprisoned her. Rin dreams of getting back together with Hatsuharu and wakes up to him finding her on the sidewalk outside the hospital. Rin moves into Kazuma's house to recuperate. Shigure visits her and tells her Ren was lying about knowing how to break the curse, but it does not matter as it will eventually break, now that the zodiac animals are for once all alive together. Tohru overhears this and demands to know how soon, because it has to be before next spring, finally admitting the one she most wants to save is Kyo.
19	January 19, 2006	978-4-592-17889-7	March 18, 2008 (TP); August 16, 2006 (CY); February 21, 2017 (YP)	978-1-59816-863-1 (TP); 978-981-269-145-3 (CY); 978-0-316-50164-4 (YP)
Chapters 108–113
Shigure tells Tohru the cat exists to give the rest of the zodiac a scapegoat they can feel is worse than they are, which distresses her. Tohru feels guilty for letting Kyo replace her mother as the most important person in her heart. On the second anniversary of Kyoko's death, Kyo visits her grave alone and meets Tohru's grandfather, who tells him Tohru speaks formally and politely as an imitation of her father. When Kyo asks Tohru, she admits she started doing it to replace her dead father in her mother's eyes. Kyo remembers watching over her as a child and seeing how lonely she was. He hugs her, because he can't help but love her. Unable to stand being around Kyo and Tohru being awkward with each other, Yuki leaves the house and ends up visiting Ayame's shop with Kakeru and Machi, where Ayame forcibly costumes Machi. The other younger zodiac members also notice Tohru and Kyo's attraction, and Momiji warns Kyo that if he does not act on it, others (such as himself) might steal her away. Yuki gives Machi an apology gift for Ayame's behavior at the shop, and tells her they should get together during summer vacation. Kakeru invites Yuki over for dinner, to introduce him to his girlfriend, the daughter of the man who died when his car struck and killed Kyoko. On the way to Kakeru's girlfriend's place he admits that he hated Tohru at the time when the accident occurred because he felt that Tohru thought that she deserved sympathy and she was the only one affected. Kakeru apologizes to Tohru for his past hostility to her, shortly after the accident, and she thanks him for helping Yuki become more cheerful.
20	May 19, 2006	978-4-592-18400-3	July 1, 2008 (TP); October 11, 2006 (CY); February 21, 2017 (YP)	978-1-4278-0009-1 (TP); 978-981-269-237-5 (CY); 978-0-316-50164-4 (YP)
Chapters 114–119
When Tohru admits that claiming she wants to free all the Sohmas is "deception" because she cares most about Kyo, Kagura says she should tell Kyo this, but when they are alone she lacks the courage to. Ren tells Shigure the box she asked Rin to steal belonged to Akira, and a flashback shows how as a young maid she fell in love with the Sohma family head. Ren was shocked Akira gave the unborn god of the zodiac more attention than herself, then bitterly disappointed to give birth to a girl instead of a proper male heir; in response she denied the zodiac bond has real power and demanded Akito be raised as a boy. In the present, Shigure tells Ren that she, as the only one obsessed with Akira, should have the box. In a dream, Akito remembers Akira's promise the zodiac would always be with her and that there would be no sadness or loneliness, which could be the main reason why Akito believes that life is un changing. Akito awakes knowing Momiji's curse has been broken while Momiji has mixed feelings because he is free but also now alone. As Akito tells Kureno he tried to mold Yuki to prove their bond's strength, Ren demands Akira's box at knife-point, but when she opens it, it is empty. Akito picks up the dropped knife to attack her but stops; at that moment, Hiro's curse breaks. He too has mixed feelings, and his mother tells him farewells are always lonely. Kureno tells Akito she needs to leave because Akito has been overprotected. Akito blames Kureno for this and stabs him. Meanwhile, Tohru works up the courage to talk to Kyo, and he accuses her of loving him even though he is "hateful." Kyo tells her he was present when her mother died, and could have saved Kyoko except it would have triggered his transformation, and blames himself for "killing" her like his own mother.
21	September 19, 2006	978-4-592-18401-0	November 11, 2008 (TP); May 2, 2007 (CY); March 21, 2017 (YP)	978-1-4278-0682-6 (TP); 978-981-269-538-3 (CY); 978-0-316-50168-2 (YP)
Chapters 120–125
Kyo tells Tohru that her mother's last words were "I won't forgive you", and asks how Tohru could forgive him if he cannot forgive himself. Tohru rejects the either/or choice along with her mother's supposed judgment, saying she loves him. He runs away, Yuki chases after him, and as Tohru follows she meets Akito, still carrying the knife. Akito tells Tohru she must feel triumphant that she has won, and cuts her on the arm. Tohru, thinking that she still loves Kyo despite his rejection, tells Akito she must be lonely amid all his fears. She offers a fresh start, introducing herself and asking if they can be friends. Before Akito can take her hand, the cliff she stands on crumbles and she falls. Shigure and Yuki respond to Akito's cry for help. Kyo returns to the house and learns of Tohru's accident, and runs to where she lies unconscious; Yuki is there first. She wakes long enough to tell him she is okay before falling unconscious, and he kisses her. That evening, Yuki confronts Kyo for not going to the hospital with Tohru. Kyo says it was better that Yuki was there, as he cannot protect her himself. As they fight, they each admit they envy and admire the other for different reasons, an argument Yuki wins by saying Kyo is the only one who can make Tohru happy and he doesn't have to protect her like a super hero would. Hanajima and Uotani, however, are not as forgiving and ban Kyo from visiting her until he proves he is sorry. At the hospital, Momiji tells Akito that to make up for her deeds, she needs to cherish Kureno and Tohru, after which Akito visits Tohru. Yuki, feeling lonely and needing to reach out, buys Machi a gift—a figurine of an anime character, Mogeta, she especially likes. They admit they are glad they found each other and hold hands.
22	January 19, 2007	978-4-592-18402-7	March 17, 2009 (TP); July 31, 2007 (CY); March 21, 2017 (YP)	978-1-4278-0683-3 (TP); 978-981-269-898-8 (CY); 978-0-316-50168-2 (YP)
Chapters 126–131
Kyo visits his father and admits guilt in the death of his mother, but refuses to be locked away forever. While his father is still screaming at him for ruining his life and how he should disappear, Kyo remembers when he was younger how his father would not just scream over him telling him to disappear but also his mother. Kyo also remembers the day his mother committed suicide that he wanted his mother to live and he didn't want her to be thrown away while she was still alive. Finally Kyo recalls that he also doesn't want to throw anything away and he will do what he can as long as he is alive to live. Meanwhile, Akito orders the cat's prison destroyed, despite his ancestor's wishes. Kyo and Akito both think about needing to move on from their fathers. As Hiro tells Kisa he is free of the curse, they meet Kyo throwing up afterwards in the street caused by the stress of confronting his father. As Kisa offers him help, Kyo sees the image of Tohru in her. When Akito tells Hanajima and Uotani about stabbing Kureno, Hanajima "senses" that Akito is female—that Akito is the "other woman" that Kureno had promised to stay with. Hanajima, Uotani, and Yuki continue to ban Kyo from visiting Tohru in the hospital, because she is still hurt by his rejection. Kureno tells Uotani he is leaving Akito, and she tells him she will go where he does and later helps him move out of the main house. When Tohru is discharged, she sees Kyo and runs away. At the same time that Kyo chases Tohru, Yuki calls Machi and ask to meet. When Kyo catches up with Tohru, he apologizes and tells her he loves her and won't need any more chances because this is it. He kisses her and also confesses that it's not the first time they've kissed. Tohru asks if she can hug him, and he warns her that his transformation may be the cause of hardship together; Tohru doesn't mind since it is Kyo. They hug, but Kyo does not transform—his curse is broken. As Akito feels Kyo's curse break, she remembers in flashback visiting Tohru in the hospital, and tells her father's memory she is stepping forward despite fear, before saying goodbye. All the remaining zodiac animals are shown realizing the curse is gone, and each one cries "like the day I was first born in the world." Yuki is with Machi when his curse lifts, and in his grief embraces and kisses her. The story of the zodiac's origin is retold, this time showing the god as a lonely and selfish being, who befriends the cat first of the animals.
23	March 19, 2007	978-4-592-18403-4	July 6, 2009 (TP); February 1, 2008 (CY); April 18, 2017 (YP)	978-1-4278-0827-1 (TP); 978-981-269-900-8 (CY); 978-0-316-50176-7 (YP)
Chapters 132–136
At a last meeting of the zodiac, Akito comes dressed in a woman's kimono, a gift from Shigure. Akito apologizes and tells them she will now live as a woman and remain head of the family, but they are free to go where they will; as she speaks, she remembers her recent argument with Shigure about their relationship and realizes she loves him. Rin tells Tohru she cannot forgive Akito and wonders how others seem to move on so easily, and Tohru recognizes the Sohmas all need time to heal. Yuki makes plans to apply to a distant university. Kyo waits for Tohru to finish her exams, and other classmates are astonished at how much Kyo has changed his opinion about girls. To give Kyo a hard time, Hanajima and Uotani tag along when he and Tohru go on their first real date, but they realize he's thought of plans to complete with Tohru. When Kyo and Tohru later visit her mother's grave alone, he tells Tohru he wants to train at a different dōjō than Kazuma's, in another city, and Tohru agrees to go with him. A flashback shows Kyoko's dying thoughts, as she regrets leaving Tohru alone, and that Kyoko's last words to Kyo were cut off before she could say "if you do not protect Tohru". At graduation, as everyone prepares to depart, Shigure moves in with Akito, and each Sohma has flashbacks of memories of time with Tohru. Yuki thanks Tohru for helping "raise him" to become human and how she acted like a mother to him and how he enjoyed his time with her, as did everyone else. In the final pages, Tohru and Kyo's granddaughter searches for them but is told by her mother they are taking a walk together. They are shown holding hands.

=== Fruits Basket Another ===
No.	Original release date	Original ISBN	English release date	English ISBN
1	August 19, 2016	978-4-592-21851-7	July 24, 2018	978-1-9753-5339-1
Chapters 1–4; Bonus Chapter
2	September 20, 2017	978-4-592-21852-4	November 13, 2018	978-1-9753-8224-7
Chapters 5–8; Bonus Chapter
3	March 20, 2019	978-4-592-21853-1	November 12, 2019	978-1-9753-5859-4
Chapters 9–12
4	February 18, 2022	978-4-592-21853-1	December 13, 2022	978-1-9753-6172-3
Chapter 13; The Three Musketeers Arc Chapters 1-3; The Three Musketeers Arc 2 Chapters 1-3
