= Cheh =

Cheh is both a given name and a surname. Notable people with the name include:

- Chang Cheh (1923–2002), Hong Kong filmmaker, screenwriter, lyricist, and producer
- Mary Cheh (born 1950), American politician
- Lee Chin Cheh, Malaysian politician and businessman

== See also ==
- Che (surname)
- Chen (surname)
- 徹 (disambiguation)
- Chekh
- Cholesterol-5,6-oxide hydrolase, an enzyme
