= List of Fruits Basket characters =

Tohru Honda (full figure at center right) with the members of the Soma family affected by the zodiac curse.

The characters of Fruits Basket were created by Natsuki Takaya in the manga written and illustrated by her. The manga was serialized in 136 chapters in the monthly manga magazine Hana to Yume between January 1999 and November 2006, and collected in 23 tankōbon volumes by Hakusensha. The series was adapted as a drama CD distributed as a promotional item with an issue of Hana to Yume and as a 26-episode anime television series produced by Studio DEEN initially broadcast on TV Tokyo between July 5 and December 27, 2001. The manga is licensed in English by Chuang Yi in Singapore, Madman Entertainment in Australia and New Zealand, and Tokyopop in North America. The anime is licensed in English by FUNimation Entertainment, which distributes it in North America itself, in the United Kingdom through Revelation Films, and in Australia and New Zealand through Madman Entertainment.

The series tells the story of Tohru Honda, an orphan girl who, after meeting Yuki, Kyo, and Shigure Soma, learns that thirteen members of the Soma family are possessed by the animals of the Chinese zodiac and cursed to turn into their animal forms when they embrace someone of the opposite sex or their bodies come under a great deal of stress. As the series progresses, Tohru meets the rest of the zodiac and the family's mysterious head, Akito Soma, and eventually resolves to break the curse that burdens them.

The spellings used here are those given in the official Region 1 DVD and English manga releases. Names are given in Western order, with the family name last.

== Creation and conception ==
According to Natsuki Takaya in interviews, Tohru Honda was the first character she created for the series, with Yuki and Kyo Soma soon after. When asked how she came up with Tohru's personality and background, she said:

I thought that for a girl to accept other people's feelings so wholeheartedly, she'd have to have a slightly unusual way of looking at things so that she wouldn't be crushed by having so much empathy. But I still worried that I needed something else to flesh her out. And then the thought, "Oh, yeah—I'll make her use super-polite language, and use it incorrectly!" came to me all at once. After that, her character was completed in no time.

Takaya gave Tohru a name normally used only for men because she likes to give masculine names to female characters "to balance them out." In addition, Takaya chose to have other characters address her as "Tohru-kun", using an honorific typically used for boys, because she thought it was "a more dignified form of address."

The next characters Takaya developed were Yuki, Kyo, and Shigure Soma, and of these Kyo was "the first character whose personality and looks really hit me...without any hesitation." According to the Fruits Basket Character Book, she had Yuki dress in Chinese-style clothes because she likes them. She added that she believes they suit his androgynous nature, and that she deliberately gave Yuki and Kyo different tastes to distinguish them.

Takaya described these four characters, Tohru, Yuki, Kyo, and Shigure, as the main cast. The first character she developed after them was Kisa Soma, whom she described as "in competition to be the first or second most beautiful character."

Takaya named most of the cursed Somas after the month in the former Japanese lunisolar calendar that corresponds to their zodiac animal. The exceptions are Kureno and Momiji, whose names were swapped by mistake; Kyo, who as the cat is not part of the official zodiac; and Yuki. According to the author, no other names have special meanings.

== Tohru's family and friends ==
=== Tohru Honda ===
Voiced by: Hiroko Konishi (1999 Drama CD), Yui Horie (2001 anime, 2005 Drama CD), Manaka Iwami (2019 anime) (Japanese); Laura Bailey (English)

Tohru Honda (本田 透, Honda Tōru) is an orphaned high school student who, at the start of the story, begins living with Shigure, Yuki, and Kyo Soma in exchange for housekeeping. She loves to cook, describes herself as an excellent housekeeper, and has an after-school job as an office janitor to pay her tuition fees to avoid being a burden on her grandfather. She is depicted as polite, optimistic, extremely kind, and selfless; several other characters, including Kyo, Rin, and Saki, tell her she needs to look out for herself and not shoulder everyone else's burdens. In the original Japanese, Tohru habitually speaks formally (see Honorific speech in Japanese), but not always correctly, a habit she picked up from her father, Katsuya, after he died when she was three, as a way of replacing him in her mother's eyes. Tohru's mother, Kyoko, raised her alone until she died in a car accident shortly after Tohru entered high school, a few months before the start of the story. Tohru repeatedly calls Kyoko the most important person in her life and treasures her photograph; when she falls in love with Kyo she feels guilty of being "unfaithful" to her mother's memory.

In the first half of the series, as Tohru learns about the zodiac curse and its effects on those she loves, she becomes distressed, and when she learns that the dangerous Akito is the "god" of the zodiac, she resolves to break the curse. Only later does she admit that she wants to free Kyo most of all. Despite setbacks, both external and personal, Tohru stubbornly persists in her goal and eventually frees Kyo and her friends. In the last chapter, she is moving with Kyo to another city so he can continue his martial arts training, and in the final pages it is shown that they had a son and a granddaughter.

In the sequel series Fruits Basket another, Tohru and Kyo are married with three children, their oldest son Hajime acting as the male protagonist.

=== Arisa Uotani ===
Voiced by: Yuka Imai (2001 anime, 2005 Drama CD), Atsumi Tanezaki (2019 anime) (Japanese); Parisa Fakhri (2001 anime), Elizabeth Maxwell (2019 anime) (English)

Arisa Uotani (魚谷 ありさ, Uotani Arisa) is a former gang member (a "yankee", the Japanese version of the American "thug" image) and one of Tohru's closest friends. Arisa is depicted as tough, brash, and sometimes violent; she wears long skirts, sometimes carries a lead pipe, and often speaks like a man (see Gender differences in spoken Japanese). Arisa is tall for a girl, and once claims she wishes to reach 6 feet (1.8 m) in height. She is especially competitive with Kyo and bickers with him frequently. Her childhood was troubled: her father is an alcoholic and her mother left him for another man when Arisa was young; Arisa joined an all-girl gang called The Ladies in fifth grade, and idolized Kyoko Honda's reputation from her gang days. When Arisa met Kyoko's daughter Tohru in middle school, and then Kyoko herself, she was shocked by the change from gang-leader into doting mother, but became friends after Kyoko helped her escape from her gang. With Saki Hanajima, she swore on Kyoko's grave to look after Tohru, and in their "parental" protection of Tohru, noted by Kyo and Yuki, Arisa is depicted as the brash and direct father-figure. Tohru calls her Uo and her manga symbol is a fish, the meaning of the first kanji (魚) of her family name. Arisa works a couple of different part-time jobs during the series; at one of them, in a convenience store, she meets Kureno Soma and is immediately attracted to him, though she worries about their nine-year age difference. They meet a second time a few days later, when he nearly kisses her after buying her lunch, but after that he refuses to see her again because of his promise to stay with Akito, and she tries to get over him. When Kureno leaves Akito, Arisa helps him move out, telling him that she has been waiting for him all this time, and in the final chapter she is preparing to move in with him.

=== Saki Hanajima ===
Voiced by: Yūko Minaguchi (1999 Drama CD), Reiko Yasuhara (2001 anime, 2005 Drama CD), Yumi Tōma (2012 Drama CD), Satomi Satō (2019 anime) (Japanese); Daphne Gere (2001 anime), Jad Saxton (2019 anime) (English)

Saki Hanajima (花島 咲, Hanajima Saki) is a psychic girl who has the ability to sense people's "waves" and send out electric waves, and one of Tohru's closest friends. She is depicted as very perceptive; and conducts herself in a deadpan manner. Saki is often seen eating or doing Tohru's or Arisa's hair when not in class. According to an author's note, in contrast with her Gothic Lolita appearance, she likes shōjo manga and novels and bought a copy of Shigure Soma's Heartthrob. Tohru calls her Hana, and her manga symbol is a small flower, the meaning of the first kanji (花) of her family name. Saki had trouble controlling her abilities when she was young, and blamed herself for the near-fatal collapse of a boy who was bullying her. Like Arisa, Saki is extremely protective of Tohru, who was the first person in school that truly accepted her, which helped her gain control of her powers. She wears black fingernail polish and (when not in her school uniform) black dresses, often with a cloak or veil, habits Saki started before she met Tohru as a way of signaling her guilt. With Arisa, she promised on Tohru's mother's grave to look after Tohru and in their near-"parental" protection, she acts as the "motherly" figure. She uses her reputation for sending out "poison waves" to shield Tohru from the malice of Yuki's fan club. She has a close relationship with her family, which accepts and nurtures her gifts, especially her younger brother, Megumi, who also has psychic abilities. When Saki sees Kazuma Soma when he comes in for Kyo's parent-teacher conference, she calls him "handsome," and later at the class performance of Sorta Cinderella, she seeks Kazuma out to talk with him. Kyo is disturbed enough at the idea of Saki in a relationship with his foster-father, that she and Arisa tease him with the possibility. However, in the final chapter, Saki is working as a cook at Kazuma's dojo.

In the sequel series Fruits Basket another, she has a son named Rio Mosca.

=== Katsuya Honda ===
Voiced by: Yoshimasa Hosoya (2019 anime) (Japanese); J. Michael Tatum (English)

Katsuya Honda (本田 勝也, Honda Katsuya) is the deceased father of Tohru Honda and husband of Kyoko Honda. He appears only in the manga in flashbacks. Katsuya habitually speaks formally (see Honorific speech in Japanese) as a way of distancing himself from the world, a habit that, according to his father, Tohru later adopts. He meets Kyoko as a student teacher at her middle school and recognizes that her rebellious behavior was as much about protection as his own polite manners; in turn, Kyoko initially describes his manners as "fake polite". Despite their eight-year difference in age (he was 23, she was 15), they fall in love; he helps her set aside her gangster lifestyle and they married after she finishes middle school. Three years after Tohru is born, Katsuya dies of pneumonia while on a business trip.

=== Kyoko Honda ===
Voiced by: Reiko Yasuhara (2001 anime), Miyuki Sawashiro (2019 anime) (Japanese); Julie Mayfield (2001 anime); Lydia Mackay (2019 anime) (English)

Kyoko Honda (本田 今日子, Honda Kyōko), née Katsunuma (勝沼), is the deceased mother of Tohru Honda, appearing only in flashbacks and photographs treasured by Tohru. In middle school, Kyoko is the leader of an all-female Bōsōzoku gang called Red Butterfly Suicide Squad (The Crimson Butterfly of Route 7 (大 ７の赤い蝶, Dai nana no akai chō) in the anime), the name coming from how a motorcycle's tail-lights supposedly look like a red butterfly at night. Tohru tells Kyo Soma that her mother was ignored and rejected by her parents, and fell in love with a student teacher named Katsuya Honda who stands up for her when her parents disown her after a gang fight. Katsuya and Kyoko marry after she leaves middle school and has a daughter, Tohru, and Kyoko learns how to work through difficulties together with Katsuya. She is devastated by her husband's unexpected death and nearly kills herself before remembering her three-year-old daughter needed her. Because of her experiences, Kyoko raises Tohru to believe that everyone needs to feel needed, and helps Arisa leave her own gang. Tohru calls Kyoko the most important person in her life, and repeats bits of her mother's emotional wisdom throughout the series. Kyoko dies a few months before the start of the series when she is struck by a car. Kyo is present at the accident but is unable to save her without revealing his curse, and hears her last words as "I'll never forgive you." In chapter 135, a flashback of her final moments shows that she holds no ill will toward Kyo and is in fact trying to say "I'll never forgive you if you don't keep your promise to protect Tohru"—an act of charging Kyo to protect Tohru. Kyoko never held a grudge against Kyo.

== Sohma family ==
=== Cursed members ===
==== Akito Soma ====
Voiced by: Murasaki Wakaba (2001 anime), Junko Minagawa (2012 Drama CD), Maaya Sakamoto (2019 anime) (Japanese); Chad Cline (2001 anime), Colleen Clinkenbeard (2019 anime) (English)
Kid Akito Voiced by: Yuka Imai (2001 anime) (Japanese); Aaron Dismuke (2001 anime), Trina Nishimura (2019 anime) (English)

Akito Soma (草摩 慊人, Sōma Akito) is the head of the Soma family and very frail. In all but the 2001 anime adaptation, Akito is revealed to be female despite spending a majority of the time masquerading as a man. She often gets sick and runs fevers, and Hatori Soma claims half his doctor's work is tending to Akito, who he says "specializes in getting sick." Akito's age is not given, but she is a few years younger than Ritsu and is said to be at least twenty by Shigure. Akito is depicted as short-tempered and abusive, and has physically and emotionally scarred many Somas, including Hatori, Rin, Hiro, Kisa, Yuki, and Kyo. While part of the Soma family curse, Akito is not possessed by a spirit of the Chinese zodiac, but rather fulfills the role of the Jade Emperor, a figure from the stories about the origins of the zodiac; she describes herself as the "god" of the zodiac, the "one who controls the zodiac", and the "master of their souls." Kazuma Soma tells Tohru Honda that to the rest of the zodiac, Akito is a figure of awe they cannot resist, with whom they have a "bond of blood." Akito's mother, Ren Soma, denies that the zodiac bond is real, and Akito is obsessed with proving her wrong. Once the zodiac members are old enough, she desires to have them live within the Soma compound for the rest of their lives in a never-ending "banquet." Akito initially allows Tohru to live with Shigure because she believes that Tohru will come to reject Yuki and Kyo because of the curse, but when instead they learn that outsiders can accept them and begin to grow away from Akito, she comes to hate Tohru most of all. This leads to her obsession with eliminating Tohru so she will never have contact with them again, even mocking Tohru's deceased mother. This leads to Tohru confronting her about her abusive actions toward the other Somas. In the anime, Akito and Tohru come to an accommodation centered on Akito's fears of dying young, which is an effect of the curse described only in the anime. In the manga, through Tohru's efforts to break the curse, Akito comes to realize that holding onto the bond, she has hurt herself as much as the others and lets it go. It is later revealed she was jealous of Tohru, who was never afraid of the Somas’ zodiac transformations, and how she was always happy to live with them while Akito herself was not. Tohru later tells Akito: "We are no gods. We're just human beings. But we always have special bonds". Resulting in Akito finally crying for the first time on Tohru's shoulder.

In the first anime series, Akito is biologically male. In the manga, Akito is female but was brought up as a boy by her mother, Ren, and it is not revealed until Chapter 97 that Akito is biologically female. Ren decided to raise Akito as a male because she was ashamed of giving birth to a girl who was "god" to the zodiac, and who was receiving more attention from her husband, Akira. The only other Somas who knew about Akito's biological sex were the oldest four zodiac members: Kureno, Shigure, Hatori, and Ayame. After the curse is broken, Akito no longer hates Tohru and finally accepts her as friend. She later begins dressing and living as a woman, and in the final chapter Shigure, whom she is in love with, moves in with her.

==== Yuki Soma ====
Voiced by: Aya Hisakawa (Drama CD, 2001 anime), Nobunaga Shimazaki (2019 anime) (Japanese); Eric Vale (English)
Kid Yuki Voiced by: Miyuri Shimabukuro (2019 anime) (Japanese); Kate Bristol (2001 anime), Amanda Lee (2019 anime) (English)

Yuki Soma (草摩 由希, Sōma Yuki) is the Rat of the Chinese zodiac and younger brother of Ayame. Yuki is depicted as an attractive, reserved, and accomplished young man with many admirers, but who finds being friendly difficult. When Yuki was young, his mother gave control of him to Akito Soma, who kept him separated from the rest of the zodiac and convinced him no one liked him; because of this, Yuki has low self-esteem and felt isolated throughout most of his childhood. He is known as "Prince Yuki" and "Prince Charming" at school, where he has a fan club headed by Motoko Minagawa that tries to "protect" him from other admirers, further isolating Yuki. He is pressured by his popularity to become president of the student council despite his misgivings. Yuki, however, wishes that he could be with people as friends, rather than be admired from afar, and envies both Kyo Soma's and Kakeru Manabe's easy ways with others. Yuki is touched when, faced with the prospect of having her memory of the Soma family secret erased, Tohru Honda asks that he remain her friend afterwards, which no one had asked him before. With Tohru's help, Yuki is gradually able to "open the lid" of his feelings, and the summer after she begins living in Shigure's house, Yuki admits to himself how dear she is to him.

When Yuki was around six or seven years old, he ran away from Akito. Yuki has always had fond feelings for Tohru for actually "needing" him. He later finally admits to Manabe that he was looking for a mother-figure and found her in Tohru. As the Rat, Yuki despises the current cat, Kyo, despite envying him, and is contemptuous of his attempts to defeat him. Even when he realizes the true nature of his feelings for Tohru, Yuki is uncomfortable when he recognizes her and Kyo's growing feelings for each other. Yuki becomes attracted to Machi Kuragi, a student council treasurer who also had a traumatic childhood, and falls in love with her. When he knows Kyo will be confessing his love to Tohru, Yuki meets with Machi and is with her when his curse lifts, whereupon the first thing he does is embrace her. In the last chapter, he gives Machi a key to his new apartment, where he will be living as he attends university.

==== Kyo Soma ====
Voiced by: Tomokazu Seki (Drama CD, 2001 anime), Yuma Uchida (2019 anime) (Japanese); Jerry Jewell (2001 and 2019 anime) (English)
Kid Kyo Voiced by: Kyōsuke Ikeda (2001 anime), Asuna Tomari (2019 anime) (Japanese); Avery Rice Williams (2001 anime), Alison Viktorin, Suzie Yeung (2019 anime) (English)

Kyo Soma (草摩 夾, Sōma Kyō) is cursed by the cat, an animal not in the Chinese zodiac, but which legend says would have been if it had not been tricked by the Rat into missing the induction feast (see Zodiac origin stories). In an author's note, Natsuki Takaya described the character of Kyo as a powerful force that pulled the story of Fruits Basket along. Kyo is depicted as an orange-haired young man who is short-tempered and charismatic, if initially awkward around people; Arisa once calls him "anger management boy," and Yuki Soma expresses envy of his ability to make friends easily. He is also fiercely competitive, and can be easily manipulated into doing things he does not want to by turning it into a competition—especially against Yuki. As the cat, Kyo hates Yuki, the current Rat of the zodiac, whom he sees as never having to work hard at anything, and has dedicated his life to defeating him. Shortly before the series beginning, Kyo made a bet with Akito: if he defeats Yuki in a fight before graduating high school, he would officially be accepted as part of the zodiac; however, if he does not, Kyo would be confined inside the Soma estate for the rest of his life. Despite many months of strict training, however, Kyo never lands a decent blow on Yuki. Their rivalry distresses Tohru, who likes them both, but she comes to worry even more when they do not fight. The two eventually tell each other, during an argument, they envy as well as despise each other and come to a truce for Tohru's sake.

At the start of the story, Kyo moves into Shigure's house with Yuki and Tohru. When Kyo was young, his mother died in an accident rumored to be suicide over her son's curse, and after his father rejected him, Kyo was taken in by Kazuma Soma. The two love each other as father and son, but Kazuma insists he continue to live with Shigure because he believes Tohru is helping him open up. Aside from his foster father, however, Kyo pushes away the people who want to help him, because he is ashamed of the cat's true form—a grotesque, foul-smelling, monster—which he turns into when his bone juzu bead bracelet is removed. When Tohru sees his true form, however, she follows him to beg him to stay with her, which strengthens their bond. However, Kyo also blames himself for the death of Tohru's mother, whom he could have saved at the risk of turning into a cat, and he was shaken by Kyoko's last words, "I'll never forgive you..." As the story progresses, Kyo falls in love with Tohru, but he refuses to subject her to the pain he is convinced he will cause, so when she confesses she loves him, he rejects her, calling himself "disillusioned." Only when Arisa, Saki, and Yuki impress upon him how deeply his rejection hurt Tohru does he get up the courage to accept her, and when he does finally confess to her, his curse lifts—along with the rest of the zodiac. In the last chapter, he and Tohru move out of Shigure's house and prepare to go to another city, where he will study at another dojo in preparation for inheriting Kazuma's, and in the final pages it is shown that they had a son and a granddaughter.

==== Shigure Soma ====
Voiced by: Ryōtarō Okiayu (Drama CD, 2001 anime), Yuichi Nakamura (2019 anime) (Japanese); John Burgmeier (2001 and 2019 anime) (English)
Kid Shigure Voiced by: Mari Hino (2019 anime) (Japanese); Apphia Yu (2019 anime) (English)

Shigure Soma (草摩 紫呉, Sōma Shigure) is the Dog of the Chinese zodiac and the owner of the house where he, Tohru, Yuki, and Kyo live. He is a writer who publishes literary novels under his own name and trashy romances under pen names. His most successful pen name is Noa Kiritani, which he used for his erotic novel series, Summer-Colored Sigh. He is best friends with his cousins Hatori and Ayame, and he and Ayame like to pretend they are lovers. In an author's note, Natsuki Takaya described Shigure as a "problem child." In the anime, Shigure is depicted as lazy and dirty-minded, seeming to take nothing seriously, and with a fondness for teasing people—especially his editor Mitsuru, but also Kyo, Yuki, Tohru, and Ritsu. In the manga, he behaves the same but is also shown to be manipulative: he admits early on to Hatori that he is using Tohru as "a pawn" for some deeper purpose and calls himself "filthiest of all" for being willing to sacrifice anyone to get what he wants. More than once, he provokes Akito with apparently undiplomatic responses that create other confrontations, such as Akito's visit to the summer beach house in volumes 10–11. Shigure eventually admits to Kureno he hopes the disruption Tohru has caused will further weaken the weakening zodiac curse, and gives Tohru hints to figure out how to break it herself. Shigure's deepest feelings are for Akito, and he once had sex with Akito's mother, Ren, because he was upset that, although Akito secretly felt the same of Shigure, she was sleeping with Kureno. In the end, it is implied Shigure's machinations have been aimed at freeing Akito from the curse and the need to live as a man, so he can have her to himself. He gives Akito the woman's kimono worn when she announces she will live as a woman, and in the last chapter, he moves in with Akito in the main Soma house. Shigure habitually wears a kimono unless he has to leave home for business, which according to Takaya is his way of getting into "the spirit of things" as a writer. Takaya derived his name from the tenth month, shigurezuki or "autumn showers month," which is the month of the Dog, of the traditional Japanese calendar.

==== Kagura Soma ====
Voiced by: Yuri Shiratori (1999 Drama CD), Kotono Mitsuishi (2001 anime), Rie Kugimiya (2019 anime) (Japanese); Meredith McCoy (2001 anime), Tia Ballard (2019 anime) (English)

Kagura Soma (草摩 楽羅, Sōma Kagura) is the Boar of the Chinese zodiac. She is depicted as a girlish young woman with great strength, and the impulsive behavior associated with those born in her zodiac year. The latter often takes the form of berating and beating up Kyo, to whom she insists she is engaged. When Kagura was seven and Kyo was five, while he was all alone because he carried the curse of the cat, she played with him. One day threatened him into proposing to her (using a knife in the manga, a boulder in the 2001 anime). After the nature of her love is questioned by Rin, Kagura eventually admits to Kyo that her love was based on pity, much as Kazuma fears Tohru's is, and that she has clung to him because she has it easy compared to the cat. After Kyo tells her he cannot love her, she claims to give up hope of winning him but still loves Kyo and cares for him. When Tohru admits to Rin that she loves Kyo, Kagura impulsively strikes her, saying that the one to tell that to is Kyo himself. According to an author's note, Kagura is an "older sister type who's always ready to help." She attends a local college while living with her parents, who are shown taking her double-edged personality in stride, and with Rin. Kagura is the only female member of the zodiac who is not shown to have been injured by Akito. Takaya derived her name from the eleventh month, kagurazuki or "month of Shinto song and dance," which is the month of the Pig, of the traditional Japanese calendar.

==== Momiji Soma ====
Voiced by: Miki Nagasawa (1999 Drama CD), Ayaka Saitō (2001 anime), Kōki Miyata (2012 Drama CD), Megumi Han (2019 anime) (Japanese); Kimberly Grant (2001 anime), Mikaela Krantz (2019 anime) (English)

Momiji Soma (草摩 紅葉, Sōma Momiji) is the Rabbit of the Chinese zodiac. His father, one of the richest members of the Soma family, is Japanese, while his mother is German (they speak German and Japanese in the manga, but only Japanese in the 2001 anime). Momiji is depicted as a cute, cheerful, androgynous boy who hides a sad family life behind his sunny demeanor. In an author's note, Takaya described him as "the most comfortable" of the Somas with his spirit possession, and "the most successful of the boys." Momiji is older than he initially appears, and Tohru is surprised to learn he is only a year younger than she is. To Kyo's horror, Momiji wears the girl's version of their high school uniform with shorts instead of a skirt, until he has a growth spurt at the start of his second year and switches to the boy's uniform. He lives alone inside the Soma family compound, and was raised by servants. His mother learned about the zodiac curse when she first held him, just after he was born, and was repulsed. Her attitude towards him was so violent and unpredictable that even seeing him would cause her to go into a rage. Finally, she begged Hatori to erase her memories and said that the greatest regret of her life, "..is that that creature came out of my body." Because of this, his younger sister, Momo, is unaware he is her older brother, even though she is interested in him and starts taking violin lessons because he plays the violin. Despite his upbringing, Momiji is insightful about others and emotionally strong. In chapter 115, his curse is broken before the rest of the zodiac, and he decides to one day leave Akito despite the latter's pleading and threats. Momiji takes to Tohru very quickly, including kissing her when they first meet and hugging her when they are formally introduced despite his curse. He sometimes helps Tohru at her evening job as an office cleaner in one of his father's buildings, and once substitutes for her when she is sick with a cold. He is very fond of Tohru, and even defies Akito to protect her. He later warns Kyo that if he does not act on his feelings for Tohru, someone else, such as himself, might steal her away. In the final chapter, Momiji tells Hatsuharu and Rin that he hopes to find a girlfriend as wonderful as Tohru. Takaya derived his name from the ninth month of the traditional Japanese calendar, momijitsuki or "autumn leaves month"; he was supposed to have been named after the third month, the month of the Rabbit, but according to the author, she mixed up his and Kureno's positions in the zodiac.

In the sequel series Fruits Basket another, Momiji has a daughter named Mina.

==== Dr. Hatori Soma ====
Voiced by: Kazuhiko Inoue (2001 anime), Kazuyuki Okitsu (2019 anime) (Japanese); Kent Williams (2001 and 2019 anime) (English)
Kid Hatori Voiced by: Ikumi Hasegawa (2019 anime) (Japanese); Bryn Apprill (2019 anime) (English)

Hatori Soma (草摩 はとり, Sōma Hatori) is the dragon of the Chinese zodiac (taking the form of a seahorse). He is the private doctor to the Soma family and is responsible for suppressing memories (using a form of hypnosis that is handed down in his line of the family) of those outsiders who discover the Soma family secret, such as Yuki's childhood playmates. Hatori is depicted as a tall, somber man who is rarely amused by the antics of his best friends, Shigure and Ayame. He is often the only one who can restrain Ayame's worst behavior, and is the only person Shigure trusts enough to talk about his schemes. He takes his duties to the Soma family and as a doctor seriously and warns Tohru about the dangers of getting too involved with the family. In an author's note, Natsuki Takaya described him as "the best marriage material of the cast." When his curse activates, Hatori transforms into an 8-centimeter (3.1 in) long seahorse. According to Shigure, this is a sign the zodiac curse has weakened.

Two years before the series began, he was engaged to Kana Soma, the assistant in his doctor's office. The relationship ended when Hatori asked Akito for permission to marry Kana and in response, Akito attacked Hatori (in the original anime, she threw a vase), leaving him almost blind in his left eye. Akito then blamed Kana for the incident, and she felt so guilty about it that Hatori was forced to suppress her memory of their relationship to ease her suffering. When Tohru meets up with him near the end of Volume 2, he looks back on his time with Kana, then says his heart is like snow. After Kana marries someone else, Shigure manipulates Hatori into meeting Kana's best friend, Mayuko Shiraki, who secretly had always liked him. In the last chapter, Hatori invites Mayuko on an Okinawa vacation. Takaya derived Hatori's name from the fourth month, konohatorizuki or "month of taking leaves [to silkworms]."

In the sequel series Fruits Basket another, Hatori and Mayuko are married with a daughter named Kinu.

==== Hatsuharu Soma ====
Voiced by: Akio Suyama (Drama CD, 2001 anime), Makoto Furukawa (2019 anime) (Japanese); Justin Cook (2001 and 2019 anime) (English)
Kid Hatsuharu Voiced by: Akemi Okamura (2001 anime), Mariko Higashiuchi (2019 anime) (Japanese); Joshua Huber (2001 anime), Morgan Berry (2019 anime) (English)

Hatsuharu Soma (草摩 溌春, Sōma Hatsuharu), age 15–17, often called Haru, is the Ox of the Chinese zodiac. Hatsuharu is depicted as having a Yin and Yang personality, which mirrors the Ox's traditional personality characteristics in the zodiac. He is an older-brother figure to the younger zodiac members, and is usually calm and placid, but, if provoked, can become enraged. The Somas call these two sides of his personality his "white" and "black" sides; his hair is white with black roots, and his zodiac form is a black-and-white spotted Ox. He has a reputation in the family for being somewhat stupid, and when he was a child he blamed Yuki Soma, the current Rat, for it because of the story of how the Rat tricked the Ox to become first in the zodiac. After Yuki asked Hatsuharu whether he believes he is stupid, he realized the mental trap and has since loved Yuki. Hatsuharu is in love with Rin Soma and has an on-again/off-again secret relationship with her. He is protective of those he cares about, especially Rin, Yuki, Kisa and Hiro, and once confronts and almost punches Akito for confining Rin, and looked for Kisa when she ran away from home. Hiro admires Hatsuharu as a brother figure, even calling him Haru-nii ("big brother Haru"), but also believes that Haru is too nice to everybody for his own good. Hatsuharu has a bad sense of direction, and once becomes lost for three days in another town while looking for Kyo in order to challenge him. He likes to tease Kyo in a deadpan way; Kyo in turn calls him "downright lewd" for saying Momiji should keep wearing the girls' uniform until he gets bigger. He is usually shown wearing various jewelry and leather accessories, which, according to an author's note, he makes himself. Natsuki Takaya derived his name from the first month, hatsuharu meaning "new year" or "early spring," which is the month of the Ox, of the traditional Japanese calendar, though his name is written with different kanji than the month.

==== Ayame Soma ====
Voiced by: Takehito Koyasu (1999 Drama CD), Mitsuru Miyamoto (2001 anime), Takahiro Sakurai (2019 anime) (Japanese); Christopher Sabat (English)
Kid Ayame Voiced by: Natsumi Fujiwara (2019 anime) (Japanese); Ciarán Strange (2019 anime) (English)

Ayame Soma (草摩 綾女, Sōma Ayame) is the Snake of the Chinese zodiac, and Yuki's older brother, a young man with very long silver hair and striking eyes, which Tohru notes makes him resemble Yuki. Ayame is depicted as vivacious, flamboyant, self-confident, and self-centered, with a knack for annoying Yuki and Kyo (one of the few things they initially agree upon), and often getting hurt by Yuki and Kyo in response. In an author's note, Natsuki Takaya described him as a draining person to meet in real life. Despite his age, he refers to himself with the boyish pronoun boku (see Japanese pronouns). He runs a shop, named after himself, that sells custom-made "romantic costumes" such as frilly dresses and maid costumes with the help of Mine Kuramae, his seamstress.

Ayame is best friends with Shigure and Hatori, who are the same age; while Shigure goes along with Ayame's outrageous personality, frequently pretending to be lovers. Hatori is the only one, according to Shigure and Takaya, who can restrain Ayame's worst behavior. As the Snake, Ayame is especially susceptible to cold. When Ayame was in high school, he was president of the student council, and is proud that Yuki is following him. Ayame fears the "nothingness" of not being acknowledged.

When Ayame was young, he completely ignored Yuki, and even forgot Yuki's name once, but during the series realizes he will be completely alone, with only Yuki as company when they get older. This spurs an obsession with gaining Yuki's love, which he attempts to do by demanding it from Yuki, and later trying more thoughtful ways to prove Yuki can depend on him. As the series progresses, Yuki gradually accepts Ayame as a brother, and even tries to understand him. When Ayame is freed from the curse, the first thing he does is embrace Mine Kuramae and confess he loves her. Takaya derived the name Ayame (normally a female name, meaning iris, or "blood iris" to be more specific) from the fifth month, ayamezuki or "month of irises," which is the month of the Snake, of the traditional Japanese calendar.

In the sequel series Fruits Basket another, Ayame and Mine are married with two children, Hibika and Chizuru.

==== Kisa Soma ====
Voiced by: Kaori Nazuka (2001 anime), Reina Ueda (2019 anime) (Japanese); Kate Bristol (English)

Kisa Soma (草摩 杞紗, Sōma Kisa) is the Tiger of the Chinese zodiac. She is depicted as a cute but very shy and withdrawn girl. In author's notes, Natsuki Takaya described her as "in competition to be the first or second most beautiful character" and as a "girly-girl." When Tohru first met her, Kisa refused to speak to anyone, and had a tendency to bite when in her animal form and is seen as a little tiger cub biting anyone who approaches or angers her. When Kisa had started seventh grade, her classmates harassed and ostracized her because of her naturally tawny hair and golden eyes, an effect of her curse, and the cause of her shyness. Because she feels ashamed of being bullied, she does not tell her worried mother what is happening or why she has stopped speaking. When this distresses her mother even further, she runs away and is found by Hatsuharu. She also sees Hatsuharu as an older brother figure. Tohru Honda, who understands Kisa's distress because she was once bullied herself, helps Kisa to come out of her shell, and start to speak again. Kisa becomes very attached to Tohru, calling her "onee-chan" (translated as "big sister" in both the English manga and subtitled anime, and as "Sissy" in the English dubbed anime). She sometimes gets frustrated at Hiro because of his treatment of Tohru. Kisa likes Hiro and is hurt when he withdraws from her to protect her from Akito. As the series progresses, Kisa is shown struggling with her shyness and feels it is a major accomplishment to greet Kyo directly, instead of relying on Hiro to speak for her. In the final chapter, she is seen holding Hiro's arm and they are presumed to be a couple. Kisa is a fan of the fictional anime series Mogeta, which she sometimes watches with Tohru and Hiro. She is called Sat-chan, using just the last syllable of her given name, by Shigure and Hiro's mother. Takaya derived her name from the second month, kisaragi or "changing clothes month," which is the month of the Tiger, of the traditional Japanese calendar.

==== Hiro Soma ====
Voiced by: Yuriko Fuchizaki (2001 anime), Yō Taichi (2019 anime) (Japanese); Aaron Dismuke (2001 anime), Luci Christian (2019 anime) (English)

Hiro Soma (草摩 燈路, Sōma Hiro) is the Ram or Sheep of the Chinese zodiac and loves Kisa more than anything. They were best friends in elementary school. When he told Akito that he was in love with Kisa, Akito became furious. Afterward, Kisa was beaten up by Akito (for "no reason" to her), but Hiro knew that his confession had led Akito to attack Kisa. While visiting Kisa in the hospital, Hiro, shocked and confused thought it would be better to stay away from Kisa. When she started middle school, Hiro tried to ignore her, thinking that it would prevent her from anymore attacks by Akito. When he found out she was being picked on by the other kids, he felt he could not do anything, since he'd been ignoring her for months. Hiro accidentally witnessed Akito pushing Rin out of a window, which later causes Hiro some distress, because he found out about Hatsuharu and Isuzu dating, and witnessed Isuzu being pushed out of the window by Akito, something Haru would never forgive. Rin and Akito forced him not to tell Haru about the incident he had witnessed, but he eventually did work up the courage, thanks to his baby sister, Hinata. He tends to criticize people and seems older than he really is but frequently regrets what he says to others when he is made aware of how insensitive his remarks can be. His mother is one of the most comfortable out of the Zodiac parents with his transformation. In Chapter 118, he is freed from the curse before most of the zodiac, and the first thing he does is hold his infant sister, Hinata, for the first time. In the final chapter, he and Kisa are presumed to be a couple due to her holding his arm and his affectionately comforting her about Tohru's imminent move. Natsuki Takaya derived his name from the seventh month, fumihirogetsuki or "month of publication," which is the month of the Goat, of the traditional Japanese calendar.

==== Ritsu Soma ====
Voiced by: Miina Tominaga (2001 anime), Kengo Kawanishi (2019 anime) (Japanese); Mike McFarland (English)
Kid Ritsu Voiced by: Sarah Hussey (2001 anime), Katelyn Barr (2019 anime)

Ritsu Soma (草摩 利津, Sōma Ritsu) is the Monkey of the Chinese zodiac. He is depicted as a beautiful but unstable young man with very low self-esteem and a tendency to overreact. He apologizes frantically for everything, even things that are not his fault. In this, he takes after his mother, the hostess of the Soma family's onsen, whose position he is in training to take over. Being cursed by the Monkey, Ritsu is blessed with fast reflexes and an extremely agile body; he is able to react quickly and climb to high grounds easily. Ritsu dresses in women's clothing because he says he then feels less pressure from society. He is initially mistaken for a woman by Tohru Honda because of his long hair and beauty. Shigure likes to play with Ritsu's insecurities and gullibility, much as he does his editor, Mitsuru. When Ritsu and Mitsuru meet, they realize they have this in common, and in a bonus story in the first fan-book, he and Mitsuru are a couple. In the final chapter of the manga, Ritsu is giving Kagura one of his women's kimono, has cut his hair short, and is not dressed like a girl. Natsuki Takaya derived his name from the eighth month, odakaritsuki or "rice harvest month," which is the month of the Monkey, of the traditional Japanese calendar. In an author's note, Takaya said that she regretted how little a role Ritsu played in the main story, appearing a total of five times.

==== Isuzu Soma ====
Voiced by: Houko Kuwashima (2012 Drama CD), Aki Toyosaki (2019 anime) (Japanese); Brina Palencia (English)

Isuzu Soma (草摩 依鈴, Sōma Isuzu) is the Horse of the Chinese zodiac. She is often called "Rin" because that is an alternate reading of 鈴, the second kanji of her given name. She is tall and initially has hip-length dark hair; according to an author's note, Natsuki Takaya initially designed her with very short hair but then made it long to mimic the blowing of a Horse's mane in the wind. Takaya's fans described Rin as, "the character in charge of sexiness." Rin is depicted as stubborn and independent, to the point she cannot stand being dependent on someone else, traits associated with those born in her zodiac year. She is also sharp-tongued but concerned about others. When Rin was young her parents acted affectionate and devoted to her, unlike the parents of many cursed Somas, but when she asked if they were happy, the strain of pretending for her benefit shattered the facade. After this they neglected and abused her to the point she was hospitalized and developed a panic disorder. After this, her parents kicked her out and Rin moved into Kagura Soma's home. Rin and Hatsuharu have a romantic and sexual relationship that began before the start of the series. When Akito finds out about it, Rin claims full responsibility to protect Hatsuharu, and to punish her Akito pushes Rin out a window. While recuperating in the hospital, Rin breaks up with Hatsuharu both to protect him and to avoid burdening him, but without explaining why. To free Hatsuharu, Rin starts searching for a way to break the curse, and asks Kazuma, Shigure, and Ren Soma for help. She initially resists the assistance of Tohru Honda, who she thinks is too nice for her own good. Ren offers to help if Rin steals a treasure (a black box) from Akito, but Rin is caught by Akito, who confines her in the cat's prison and cuts off her hair. After she is finally released by Kureno, she reconciles with Hatsuharu, accepting his support. She also accepts Tohru's assistance because of the latter's kindness, and grows as protective of her as of Hatsuharu, getting angry when someone upsets or hurts her. After the zodiac curse is broken, Rin cannot understand how others can move on as if Akito's abuse never happened, and in the final chapter she says she still gets angry. Takaya derived her name from the sixth month, isuzukuretsuki or "month of the last cool spring days," which is the month of the Horse, of the traditional Japanese calendar.

==== Kureno Soma ====
Voiced by: Susumu Chiba (2012 Drama CD), Yūichirō Umehara (2019 anime) (Japanese); Ian Sinclair (English)
Kid Kureno Voiced by: Mayu Minami (2019 anime) (Japanese); Ryan Reynolds (2019 anime) (English)

Kureno Soma (草摩 紅野, Sōma Kureno) is the former Rooster of the Chinese zodiac. According to Natsuki Takaya, while he was still cursed, he did not like others to see his animal form, which was a sparrow instead of a rooster. He is depicted as a polite and selfless young man. Arisa Uotani describes Kureno as "like Tohru" because of his over-the-top politeness and scatterbrained idiosyncrasies. In his mid-teens, about ten years before the series begins, Kureno's curse was somehow broken, but because of Akito's distress he promised never to leave. Kureno and Akito have a sexual relationship, and when Shigure learned about it, some time before the start of the series, in retaliation he slept with Akito's mother, Ren. Akito keeps Kureno away from the rest of the family to hide that he is no longer cursed, and Kureno does most of Akito's work as the head of the family. As a result, Kureno is so sheltered he is 26 when he first visits a convenience store, where he meets Arisa. Despite their mutual attraction, he stays away from her because of his promise to Akito. However, when Akito locks Rin Soma away for trying to steal her father's box, it is Kureno who frees her. As the zodiac curse begins breaking down, Kureno eventually admits he is partially responsible for keeping Akito coddled and fearful by being too obedient, and Akito angrily stabs him in the back. When Kureno is released from the hospital, he moves out of the Soma compound with Arisa's help, and in the final chapter, Arisa is preparing to move in with him. In an author's note, Takaya described him as possibly the most lonely of those affected by the curse, because of his isolation. He never blames Akito for his injury and still feels a responsibility to care for her. He says the best thing he can do for her is to erase his existence. Hence his moving out of the Soma home. Takaya derived his name from the third month of the traditional Japanese calendar, kurenoharu or "late spring"; he was supposed to have been named after the ninth month, the month of the Rooster, but according to the author, she mixed up his and Momiji's positions in the zodiac.

=== Minor members ===
==== Kazuma Soma ====
Voiced by: Norihiro Inoue (2001 anime), Toshiyuki Morikawa (2019 anime) (Japanese); Dameon Clarke (English)
Kid Kazuma Voiced by: Miki Machii (2001 anime), Ayaka Nanase (2019 anime) (Japanese); Heaven Tubbs (2001 anime), Emily Fajardo (2019 anime) (English)

Kazuma Soma (草摩 籍真, Sōma Kazuma) is a master of karate who runs a dojo near the Soma family main house, where he teaches several of the younger Somas including Kyo, Kagura, Yuki, and Hatsuharu. He is usually addressed as Shishō, meaning "master". In an author's note, Takaya said that although she draws him young, his age is "almost 40." Takaya also claimed he is "clumsy with his hands and has no sense of flavor," and he is depicted as being so bad at cooking, he does not know how to prepare tea. His daily routine is taken care of by his assistant at the dojo, Kunimitsu Tomoda.

When he was a child, during their only meeting, Kazuma was mean to his grandfather simply because his grandfather was cursed by the cat. His grandfather had offered him a sweet but Kazuma had rejected it, saying it was cursed. Instead of getting angry, his grandfather merely smiled and forgave him. His cruelty at their only meeting haunted him as he grew up. To make amends, after Kyo's mother died he took in and raised Kyo, the current cat, as his foster son, and has come to think of him as his own son. Kazuma thinks well of Tohru and hopes her love for Kyo is sincere and not based on pity like his grandmother's was towards his grandfather. Both to test Tohru's feelings and to show Kyo he can be accepted by others despite his curse, Kazuma forces Kyo to show Tohru his true form. After Rin is hospitalized the second time during the series, he takes her in to recuperate so that she does not have to live inside the family compound, which he has done before. In the final chapter, Saki Hanajima has taken a job as a cook at Kazuma's dojo and she implied they are in a relationship, but according to Natsuki Takaya in Fan Book - Cat, Kazuma only sees her as Kyo's classmate.

==== Akira Soma ====
Voiced by: Akira Ishida (Japanese); Chad Cline (English)

Akira Soma (草摩 晶, Sōma Akira) is the previous head of the Soma family and Akito's father. A lonely, sickly man, he found solace in the maidservant Ren, whom he married to the objection of many people in the household thinking that she was too lowborn for his status. Ren eventually became pregnant with the God of the Zodiac, but felt jealous upon learning that her baby is a girl, fearing that she would take Akira's attention away from her. Akira agreed to Ren's request for the baby to be raised as a boy, in return for Ren's promise not to abort her. He died a few years after Akito's birth, with his daughter by his side. He privately confided to Akito that her birth as the God of the Zodiac was a proof that his love for her mother was special. However, Ren was never privy to his information, further fueling her jealousy at her daughter and starting their enmity.

==== Ren Soma ====
Voiced by: Ai Orikasa (Japanese); Katelyn Barr (English)

Ren Soma (草摩 楝, Sōma Ren) is Akito's mother. She is depicted as an elegant but obsessive woman with long black hair similar to Isuzu Soma's. According to the author's note, Takaya designed Akito and Ren to resemble each other; Shigure claims that if Akito had been raised as a woman, she would have looked very much like Ren, and Tohru once mistook Ren's voice for Akito's. Ren and Akito are extremely antagonistic towards each other; Shigure notes that she is obsessed with her child and dead husband. Her background and age were deliberately left vague by Takaya. Ren was originally a Soma household maid who won Akira's heart by being the only one to notice his loneliness and treat him with kindness, instead of as just the head of the household. She became jealous when she conceived her child and it was received, as the new god of the zodiac, more attention than herself. When the child turned out to be female instead of a proper male heir, she was afraid the baby would replace her in Akira's heart and demanded Akito be raised as a male. Before his death, Akira told Akito, but not Ren, that Akito's place in the curse was proof that his and Ren's relationship was special. To feed Akito's fear of being abandoned, Ren continually claims that Akito's bond with the zodiac is fake, rather than the true love Akito claims. To prove her wrong, Akito tried to mold Yuki into a zodiac animal devoted to her (Akito). After Akito began sleeping with Kureno Soma, sometime before the series began, Ren told Shigure to make him jealous and then seduced him to infuriate Akito. When Rin Soma approaches Ren for information about breaking the curse, Ren lies and promises to tell Rin how if she steals a black box owned by Akito, said to contain Akira's spirit. Later, goaded by Shigure, Ren threatens Akito with a knife to get the box, only to learn that it is as empty as her obsession. Ren does not appear after this, though Akito mentions that Ren has rejected her attempts to reconcile after the zodiac curse was broken.

==== Kana Soma ====
Voiced by: Haruhi Nanao (2001 anime), Minami Tsuda (2019 anime) (Japanese); Libby Smith (2001 anime), Kara Edwards (2019 anime) (English)

Kana Soma (草摩 仮名, Sōma Kana) is a Soma that is not a member of the main branch family, and is hence not privy to the details of the Soma family curse. Kana was Hatori's lover, much to the dismay of Akito. When Hatori told Akito that he intends to marry Kana, Akito violently lashed out at Hatori and injured one of his eyes, which induced a traumatic experience for Kana. To make matters worse, Akito berated Kana for Hatori's injuries, and guilt tripped her into believing the injury was her fault, and she is incapable of lifting the family curse. Overridden with guilt, Kana was unable to lead a normal life following the incident, which eventually led to Akito suggesting that Hatori should erase her memories. Hatori followed Akito's suggestion accordingly and abstained from interacting with Kana ever again. She later marries another man, having believed her involvement with Hatori was only an unrequited crush.

==== Kyo's Father ====
Voiced by: Kazuhiko Inoue (2001 anime), Shinobu Matsumoto (2019 anime) (Japanese); E. Bailey (2001 anime), Aaron Roberts (2019 anime) (English)

Kyo's biological father is a hateful man who banished him from the house after his wife's suicide, forcing him to seek refuge with Kazuma. He still blames Kyo for his wife's death, even though it is later revealed that it was his continual abuse at her for birthing the Cat of the Zodiac that led her to commit suicide.

==== Kyo's Mother ====
Voiced by: Miki Nagasawa (2001 anime), Atsuko Yuya (2019 anime) (Japanese); Wendy Powell (English)

Kyo's late mother. She was one of the few parents of the Zodiac members who accepted her son's destiny. After Kyo accidentally transformed into his real form in public, she forbade him from leaving the house. However, the fact that she was the mother of the "unwanted" Zodiac member led to her being shunned by the Soma estate, as well as abused by her husband. She took her own life by jumping into a railway track when Kyo was eight years old.

==== Okami Soma ====
Voiced by: Junko Yamamoto (2001 anime), Sachiko Kojima (2019 anime) (Japanese); Julie Mayfield (English)

Okami Soma (草摩 大神, Sōma Okami) is mother of Ritsu Soma. She owns a bath house and mirrors her son's personality, being overly apologetic and neurotic. She is one of the few Soma parents who accept their "cursed" child.

==== Momiji's Father ====
Voiced by: Toshihiko Seki (2001 anime), Junichi Yanagita (2019 anime) (Japanese); E. Bailey (2001 anime), Ben Bryant (2019 anime) (English)

Father of Momiji and Momo Soma. He is one of the few Soma parents who accept their "cursed" child and retains his memory of Momiji after the mother asks hers to be repressed.

==== Momiji's Mother ====
Voiced by: Azusa Nakao (2001 anime), Takako Honda (2019 anime) (Japanese); Elise Baughman (English)

Mother of Momiji and Momo Soma. She discovers the curse after attempting to hold Momiji when he is born, and is repulsed when he transforms. She has Hatori erase her memory of being Momiji's mother and remains unaware.

==== Momo Soma ====
Voiced by: Saya Tanaka (2019 anime) (Japanese); Megan Shipman (2019 anime) (English)

Momo Soma (草摩モモ, Sōma Momo) younger sister of Momiji Soma. She appears in the sequel, now as an adult and aware that she and Momiji are siblings.

==== Ayame and Yuki's Mother ====
Voiced by: Sayaka Ohara (Japanese); Morgan Garrett (English)

Mother of Ayame and Yuki Soma. She is a cold and shallow woman who is sometimes abusive to Yuki. She is proud of the fact that she is the mother of two Zodiac members, one of whom (Yuki) is the closest to the God of the Zodiac. Eventually, Ayame calls her out during Yuki's parent-teacher conference for her callous treatment of Yuki, which seems to have changed her for the better.

==== Soma Maid ====
Voiced by: Hitomi Shogawa (Japanese); Linda Leonard (English)

An elderly maid of the Soma clan. She has been raising Akito since young, as her mother, Ren, refused to care for her. She respects Akito terribly and willing to overlook her horrible actions since she feels like it is justified due to Akito being the "God". It is revealed that she was the one who gave Akito the box that supposedly contains Akira's soul. She did this not only to cheer Akito up but also to make her realize that she does not need a physical evidence to know that her father loved her, as the box is actually empty. However, this only made things worse as the box became a source of conflict between Akito and Ren, who is envious that she did not share Akira's supposed last gift. Near the end of the series, she and Akito converse about her impending decision to release Kyo from confinement and reveal her gender, musing that it is too late for an old woman like her to change her views, and saying that she liked Akito's old self better.

==== Kisa's Mother ====
Voiced by: Haruhi Nanao (2001 anime), Aya Endō (2019 anime) (Japanese); Cynthia Cranz (2001 anime), Jessica Cavanagh (2019 anime) (English)

Mother of Kisa. She is one of the few Soma parents who accept their "cursed" child.

==== Satsuki Soma ====
Voiced by: Mikako Takahashi (Japanese); Erica Mendez (English)

Satsuki Soma (草摩 五月, Sōma Satsuki) is mother of Hiro and Hinata. She is one of the few Soma parents who accept their "cursed" child.

==== Isuzu's Parents ====
Voiced by: Masayuki Katô (Father) and Fuyuka Ono (Mother) (Japanese); Robert McCollum (Father) and Kenneisha Thompson (Mother) (English)
They are parents of Isuzu Soma. When Rin was young, her parents acted affectionate and devoted to her, unlike the parents of many cursed Somas, but when she asked if they were happy, the strain of pretending for her benefit shattered the facade, after which they neglected and abused her to the point she was hospitalized and developed a panic disorder. After this, her parents kicked her out, forcing her to seek refuge in Kagura's house.

== Other characters ==
=== Megumi Hanajima ===
Voiced by: Omi Minami (2001 Anime), Yukiyo Fujii (2019 anime) (Japanese); Hollie Townson (2001 Anime), Leah Clark (2019 anime) (English)

Megumi Hanajima (花島 恵, Hanajima Megumi) is the younger brother of Saki. He shares his sister's flat affect, as well as her psychic ability. It is claimed he only needs to know someone's name to "curse" them

=== Kakeru Manabe ===
Voiced by: Kenichi Suzumura (2005 Drama CD), Takuya Eguchi (2019 anime) (Japanese); Aaron Dismuke (English)

Kakeru Manabe (真鍋 翔, Manabe Kakeru), sometimes called "True Pot Flies" because of the kanji that make up his name, is vice president of the student council during Yuki Soma's presidency. He is depicted as alternately lazy and charismatically energetic, strongly reminding Yuki of his older brother, Ayame, whom Kakeru refers to as "commander". Yuki also compares Manabe's ability to make friends to Kyo's. Manabe sometimes claims the student council is a super-sentai–style "School Defense Force", and once tries to get the rest of the student council to pick their team colors. When Yuki asked Manabe's younger half sister, Machi, what her favorite color is, Manabe later claimed that he knew that her favorite color was red. Though by saying so heavily implied that he knew about her crush on Yuki, who was decided by Manabe that his color, as president was red. In an author's note, Takaya calls him a good friend and evil comrade for Yuki. Manabe is Machi Kuragi's older half-brother by their mutual father's mistress, and protective of her because she is still affected by their mothers' fight, now ended, to have their own child named heir. He has a girlfriend named Komaki Nakao (whom he calls "Meat☆Angel" because of her love of meat). Tayaka notes that they "practically live together" as their mothers are both busy with work. Komaki's father drove the car that struck and killed Kyoko Honda, also killing himself. Manabe believed that Tohru thought that she was the only one affected by the accident and confronted Tohru on Komaki's behalf, saying that she was nauseating. He tells her that she is acting like she must carry the whole world's misfortune. However, Komaki was angry at him because he had disrespected Tohru's feelings. He realized that his feelings and Komaki's were not the same and vowed to understand other people better, and later apologizes to Tohru for his hurtful behavior. According to Komaki, Kakeru used to be a withdrawn, unapproachable person, but during middle school after withdrawing from the competition to be family heir he suddenly became the character Yuki meets.

In the sequel series Fruits Basket another, Kakeru has a daughter named Michi.

=== Machi Kuragi ===
Voiced by: Yuki Kaida (Drama CD), Ai Kakuma (2019 anime) (Japanese); Caitlin Glass (English)

Machi Kuragi (倉伎 真知, Kuragi Machi) is treasurer of the student council during Yuki Soma's presidency and a classmate of Hatsuharu and Momiji. She is Kakeru Manabe's younger half-sister by their mutual father's wife. Machi is depicted as a quiet, nearly emotionless young woman with occasional destructive behavior, such as wrecking the student council room. She is afraid of perfection due to when she was competing for role as heir and was forced to act perfect. She has difficulty expressing herself, which sometimes results in Manabe making decisions for her. During their childhoods, their mothers competed to have their own child named heir, a struggle that ended when first Manabe withdrew himself from the running, then Machi's mother bore a son. Machi lives apart from her family because her mother believes she resents, and is a danger to, her younger brother for supplanting her, an accusation she did not contest even though it is false.

Unlike most girls at school, she does not see Yuki as a prince, but as just another boy, even seeing him as being lonely. Her different attitude and troubled behavior catches Yuki's eye, and he makes multiple attempts at befriending her. When Yuki and Manabe visit Machi's apartment, Yuki learns that because of the pressure to be perfect when her mother was competing with Manabe's, Machi finds perfection so disturbing she has a compulsion to mar anything too orderly, such as trashing neat rooms, walking through newly-fallen snow, and breaking pieces of a new box of chalk. Machi develops feelings for Yuki, and when Tohru Honda is in the hospital and he needs to reach out to someone, Machi is able to confess to Yuki. She later becomes Yuki's girlfriend. Like the youngest Somas, Machi likes the fictional anime Mogeta, and treasures two character figurines that Yuki gives her.

=== Mitsuru ===
Voiced by: Akemi Okamura (2001 anime), Chinatsu Akasaki (2019 anime) (Japanese); Cynthia Cranz (English)

Mitsuru (満) is Shigure Soma's editor. Shigure playfully calls her Mit-chan. A stressed-out young woman, she is usually shown pleading to Shigure to finish his manuscripts on time, in response to which Shigure either evades her or falsely claims he is not finished. His tormenting pushes her to threaten suicide more than once, and Natsuki Takaya said in an author's note that Mitsuru thinks Shigure is "evil." During one such episode, she meets Ritsu Soma, with whom she later develops a romantic relationship.

=== Mayuko Shiraki ===
Voiced by: Naomi Shindō (Drama CD), Hitomi Nabatame (2019 anime) (Japanese); Anastasia Muñoz (English)

Mayuko Shiraki (白木 繭子, Shiraki Mayuko) is Tohru, Kyo, Yuki, Saki, and Arisa's homeroom teacher; what subject she teaches is never given, though in an author's note, Natsuki Takaya said she thinks Shiraki fits the image of a literature teacher. Shiraki is depicted as generally good-humored but sometimes aggressive—when Kyo attempts to leave class on Valentine's Day, she stops him at the door with a folder in his face and threatens to dye his hair black instead of orange, and once breaks up a fight between Hatsuharu and Kyo by dumping a bucket of water over them; she once demanded as a joke that, after some students familiarly addressed her "Mayu-chan-sensei," that they call her "Great Teacher Mayuko." Her parents, who worry about Shiraki being unmarried, run a bookstore where she sometimes helps out. Takaya said in an author's note that Shiraki is "possibly sad" that she is a woman and "secretly insecure of how tall she is," but since Hatori Soma is tall too, they "might look pretty good together as a tall couple."

Shiraki is best friends with Kana, Hatori's former fiancée, and through her met Hatori, Shigure, and Ayame two years before the series begins. While Shiraki was attracted to Hatori, she was glad that Kana and Hatori were happy together. She dated Shigure for a month before breaking up, partly because Shigure was distant and partly because she was only dating him to alleviate her loneliness. She was at a loss when Kana and Hatori broke up, because Hatori had erased Kana's memory of the engagement. Shiraki still has feelings for Hatori, but resents Shigure's continuing interference in her life, even when it brings her closer to Hatori. In the final chapter, Shiraki and Hatori are shown as a couple, with Hatori inviting her on an Okinawa vacation.

=== Mine Kuramae ===
Voiced by: Miki Takahashi (2001 anime), Yuka Iguchi (2019 anime) (Japanese); Amber Cotton (2001 anime), Monica Rial (2019 anime) (English)

Mine Kuramae (倉前 美音, Kuramae Mine) works at Ayame Soma's clothing store as a designer and seamstress, and lives with him in an apartment above the store. She is depicted as cheerful, passionate about costuming, and determined to do anything for Ayame; she takes care of details he neglects in his enthusiasm, such as getting permission to visit Yuki's class. Natsuki Takaya describes her as "an amazing person" for being able to keep up with Ayame. She is especially enthusiastic about dressing girls up in her outfits, sparkling at the thought of doing so, and she herself is always shown wearing a frilly maid's uniform. According to Ayame, Mine is someone he "can confide in," and Yuki suspects that she is aware of zodiac curse. When Ayame is freed from the curse, the first thing he does is embrace her and confess he loves her.

=== Motoko Minagawa ===
Voiced by: Kaori Shimizu (2001 anime), Megumi Toyoguchi (2005 Drama CD), M.A.O (2019 anime) (Japanese); Jamie Marchi (English)

Motoko Minagawa (皆川 素子, Minagawa Motoko) is the president of Yuki Soma's fan club and a year ahead of him. As a devoted fan, she is depicted as obsessive and romantic. The fan club bans any member from being alone with their "prince" to keep him "safe" by preventing any one member from "stealing" him; as such, Motoko hates any girl who gets close to Yuki—in particular, Tohru Honda, Kimi Toudou, and Machi Kuragi. Motoko and the club vice-president, Minami Kinoshita, instigate multiple plots to undermine Tohru, including visiting Saki Hanajima, whom they see as protecting Tohru with her "poison waves," at home to find a weakness, and arranging to have Tohru cast as Cinderella's wicked stepsister to make her behave badly, though this fails multiple times as a result of interference by the Soma family. The few times Motoko does speak with Yuki, she gets so overwrought that all she can do is talk about banal things, such as what he had for breakfast. When Motoko learn Tohru is hospitalized due to heavy injuries, she is finally sad for the first time and admits to everyone that she was just jealous towards Tohru because she is not open to Yuki, and that she never wanted Tohru to die easily. After learning Yuki begun fall in love with Machi and Tohru choose Kyo, Motoko choose gave up her feeling toward Yuki and support them. At her graduation, she finally confesses her love to Yuki, but she choose him as a friends instead because she knows she cannot have him, and wishes him happiness in the future with Machi and also Tohru and Kyo as well.

=== Prince Yuki Fan Club ===
==== Minami Kinoshita ====
Voiced by: Harumi Asai (2001 anime), Shizuka Ishigami (2019 anime) (Japanese); Libby Smith (2001 anime), Natalie Hoover (2019 anime) (English)

Minami Kinoshita (木之下 南, Kinoshita Minami) is the vice president of Prince Yuki Fan Club.

==== Mio Yamagishi ====
Voiced by: Yuuki Kajita (2001 anime), Anzu Haruno (2019 anime) (Japanese); Kasey Buckley (2001 anime), Emily Neves (2019 anime) (English)

Mio Yamagishi (山岸 美緒, Yamagishi Mio) is one of the members of Prince Yuki Fan Club.

==== Mai Gotou ====
Voiced by: Kaoru Suzuki (2001 anime) (Japanese); Meredith McCoy (2001 anime) (English)

Mai Gotou (後藤麻衣, Gotō Mai) is one of the members of Prince Yuki Fan Club. She only appears in original anime.

==== Rika Aida ====
Voiced by: Miwa Matsumoto (2001 anime), Chika Anzai (2019 anime) (Japanese); Elise Baughman (2001 anime), Amber Lee Connors (2019 anime) (English)

Rika Aida (相田 リカ, Aida Rika) is one of the members of Prince Yuki Fan Club.

==== Mai Iwata ====
Voiced by: Miho Okasaki (2019 anime) (Japanese); Terri Doty (2019 anime) (English)

Mai Iwata (岩田 舞, Iwata Mai) is one of the members of Prince Yuki Fan Club.

==== Chie ====
Voiced by: Kaori Maeda (2019 anime) (Japanese); Kristen McGuire (2019 anime) (English)

Chie (チエ) is one of the members of Prince Yuki Fan Club.

=== Makoto Takei ===
Voiced by: Yūji Ueda (2001 anime), Jun Fukushima (2019 anime); Kyle Hebert (English)

Makoto Takei (竹井 誠, Takei Makoto) is the student council president who is strict about the school's disciplinary code.

=== Kimi Todo ===
Voiced by: Yukari Tamura (2005 Drama CD), Rumi Okubo (2019 anime); Cherami Leigh (English)

Kimi Todo (藤堂 君, Tōdō Kimi) is one of the two student council secretaries during Yuki Soma's presidency. Kimi is depicted as an outgoing and fun-loving young woman. She is also manipulative and a mischief-maker: when Yuki first meets her, she manipulates him into sharing chocolates his fan club had just given to him. She often gives things naughty interpretations, and uses sex appeal to get her way—for example, she flirts with a teacher to get him to give the student council a new whiteboard. According to Kakeru Manabe, Kimi likes to seduce boys who already have girlfriends. According to an author's note, Kimi believes all men love her, and as long as they like her she can go out with as many people as she wants. She once tells the other student council members that she was encouraged to become the way she is by some girls once saying that if one has a pretty face, people are more willing to forgive one. Kimi sometimes speaks in third person, as in "Kimi wants this," which is a childish way of speaking in Japanese, and calls Yuki by the cutesy nickname Yun-Yun. She is good friends with Manabe and disliked by most of the girls in the school, especially Yuki's fan club.

=== Naohito Sakuragi ===
Voiced by: Jun Fukuyama (2005 Drama CD), Aoi Ichikawa (2019 anime); Micah Solusod (English)

Naohito Sakuragi (桜木 直人, Sakuragi Naohito) is the second of the two student council secretaries during Yuki Soma's presidency. When he meets Yuki, he claims he is Yuki's "rival" because he has a secret crush on Motoko Minagawa, president of the Yuki fan club. Naohito is depicted as a no-nonsense and short-tempered young man who is frequently angered by Kakeru Manabe and Kimi Toudou's antics, and the author noted that she never drew him smiling. He works hard at his student council duties and absolutely refuses to call the council the "School Defense Force," as Manabe wants. Manabe and Kimi sometimes call him Chibi-suke (chibi meaning small, and -suke being a common masculine name-ending), which irritates him because he is sensitive about his short stature.

=== Kunimitsu Tomoda ===
Voiced by: Shunsuke Hasegawa (Drama CD), Atsushi Tamaru (2019 anime) (Japanese); Jason Liebrecht (English)

Kunimitsu Tomoda (友田 邦光, Tomoda Kunimitsu) is the personal assistant under Kazuma Soma at his dojo.

== Fruits Basket Another characters ==
=== Sawa Mitoma ===
Sawa Mitoma (三苫 彩葉, Mitoma Sawa) is a first year student at Kaibara High School. She has low self-confidence and is quite timid and shy, but her world changes when she is introduced to the Soma family and befriending them. Her parents divorced and she lives with her mother, who is rarely at home. It is revealed that the source of Sawa's lack of confidence stems from her mother's constant verbal abuse by telling her how hopeless she is and how she is hated by everyone. To make it worse, when Sawa was little, her mother insulted her friends behind her back, causing them to cut their friendship with her, further isolating Sawa. As the result, Sawa never tells her mother when she made new friends. As the story progress, she grows close with Shiki and seems to have developed feelings for him.

=== Mutsuki Soma ===
Mutsuki Soma (草摩 睦生, Sōma Mutsuki) is the only child of Yuki Soma and Machi Kuragi. He and his cousin Hajime live with their older cousin Kinu Soma in order to be closer to Kaibara High School. Mutsuki is a second year student, as well as the student council vice president. While bearing resemblance with his parents, Mutsuki is almost a total opposite of them, having a penchant to tease his family and friends like his two uncles, Kakeru and Ayame.

=== Hajime Soma ===
Hajime Soma (草摩 はじめ, Sōma Hajime) is the first-born child of Kyo Soma and Tohru Honda. He has a younger brother and sister. He and his cousin Mutsuki live with their older cousin Kinu Soma in order to be closer to Kaibara High School. Hajime is a third year student, as well as the student council president. He strongly resembles Kyo inside-out and becomes the frequent target for Mutsuki to tease. He is at first wary of Sawa due to what happened between her mother and Shiki in the past, but eventually understands that she and her mother are two different people and accepts her as a friend. He helps her coming into terms with her growing resentment against her abusive mother and gives her the assurance that her life is her own. This comes from his own resentment against Kyo's father, whom he never considered as his grandfather and firmly states that Kazuma is his only grandfather.

=== Sora Soma ===
Sora Soma (草摩 昊, Sōma Sora) is the daughter of Hatsuharu Soma and Isuzu Soma. She and her twin brother Riku are first year students at Kaibara High School.

=== Riku Soma ===
Riku Soma (草摩 陸, Sōma Riku) is the son of Hatsuharu Soma and Isuzu Soma. He and his twin sister Sora are first year students at Kaibara High School.

=== Michi Manabe ===
Michi Manabe (真鍋 理, Manabe Michi) is the daughter of Kakeru Manabe and Komaki Nakao. She is a third year student at Kaibara High School. She has a younger brother in middle school named Kou. She acts like a big sister to her cousin Mutsuki Soma, whom she is looked out for since they were children.

=== Shiki Soma ===
Shiki Soma (草摩 志岐, Sōma Shiki) is the only child of Shigure Soma and Akito Soma. He is a first year middle school student and a member of the Go club (dedicated to the ancient board game), along with his cousin Chizuru Soma and his friend Rio Mosuka. Being Akito's son, he faces harassment from people who bears grudge against his mother, and his grandmother, Ren, once even attempted to kill him when he was a child. Despite the harassment, Shiki stayed quiet as to not trouble his mother. While knowing what his mother had done in the past, Shiki loves his mother unconditionally and wishes to support her. Shiki first met Sawa when he found her falling down from stairs while waiting for her mother. Sawa's mother took advantage of the accident by accusing Shiki of pushing her down to extort money from the Soma family. While the incident was resolved, ever since then, Shiki could not forget Sawa and worried for her as he saw her crying. When he met her again years later, the two of them grew close and Shiki seems to have developed feelings for her, which is noticed by everyone but Sawa herself.

=== Mina Soma ===
Mina Soma (草摩 美那, Sōma Mina) is the daughter of Momiji Soma, she has a younger sibling. She loves baseball, but she does not plan on a future in sports. Instead, Mina wants to inherit her father's business (which he inherited from his father) and expand it.

=== Chizuru Soma ===
Chizuru Soma (草摩 千弦, Sōma Chizuru) is the son of Ayame Soma and Mine Kuramae. He has an older sister named Hibika. He is a second year middle school student and a member of the Go club (dedicated to the ancient board game), along with his cousin Shiki Soma and his friend Rio Mosuka.

=== Hibika Soma ===
Hibika Soma (草摩 響歌, Sōma Hibika) is the daughter of Ayame Soma and Mine Kuramae. She is the older sister of Chizuru. Like her parents, Hibika is loud and whimsical and likes to dress up people. She loves fashion and helps take care of the family's clothing boutique while her father and mother are out of town.

=== Kinu Soma ===
Kinu Soma (草摩 帛, Sōma Kinu) is the daughter of Hatori Soma and Mayuko Shiraki. She is a university student. She stated that she does not want to become a doctor like her father, but rather, "doing something that doesn't require a lot of effort would be nice." Kinu lives in an old, Soma-owned house, watching over her two younger cousins Hajime and Mutsuki during the school year.

=== Rio Mosca ===
Rio Mosca (リオ・モスカ, Mosuka Rio) is the son of Saki Hanajima. His father is a foreigner. He is a third year middle school student and a member of the Go club (dedicated to the ancient board game), along with his friends Shiki Soma and Chizuru Soma. According to Rio's uncle, his mother's mysterious psychic abilities do not transfer to male family members, so presumably, Rio is a normal kid. He is described by Sawa as being calm and gentle.

=== Ruriko Kageyama ===
Ruriko Kageyama (蔭山 瑠璃子, Kageyama Ruriko) is the daughter of Motoko Minagawa. Ruriko is the president of the Soma Fan Club, similar to how her mother used to be the president of Yuki Fan Club. Unlike her mother, however, Ruriko takes her devotion and adoration for the Soma family to the extreme, almost to the point of worship.
