= Toru =

TORU or Toru may refer to:

- TORU, spacecraft system
- Tōru (given name), Japanese male given name
- Toru, Pakistan, village in Mardan District of Khyber-Pakhtunkhwa, Pakistan
- Tõru, village in Kaarma Parish, Saare County, Estonia
- Toru River, river in North Sumatra, Indonesia

== See also ==
- 亨 (disambiguation)
- 徹 (disambiguation)
