= Che (cigarette) =

Cigarette brand

- An old German pack of Che cigarettes, with a German text warning at the bottom of the pack.
- Product type: Cigarette
- Produced by: Landewyck Tobacco
- Country: Luxembourg
- Introduced: 2000; 26 years ago
- Markets: See Markets

Che (In Chile known as El Che) is a Luxembourgish brand of cigarettes, currently owned and manufactured by "Landewyck Tobacco". The cigarettes are named after the popular Argentine Marxist revolutionary Che Guevara.

== History ==
Che was introduced in 2000 and has become a popular brand since its introduction. The cigarettes consist out of Burley, Virginia and oriental type tobaccos, and the tobacco itself is additive free.

== Controversy ==
In 2012, Polish conservative parliament member Stanisław Pięta of the Law and Justice party announced he would file a lawsuit against Landewyck Tobacco for selling Che cigarettes in Poland. He said the Che cigarettes were "propaganda which is spreading a totalitarian ideology" and that "Polish law prohibits the propaganda of totalitarian ideologies, whether that be Fascist or Communist". For Stanisław Pięta it is inadmissible to turn "Communist assassins into pop culture icons." It would be something like "the marketing of tobacco packs with the effigies of Hermann Göring or Joseph Goebbels.", which were two of the main leaders of the Nazi Germany regime.

Rona Pologne, the company responsible for the marketing of the brand in Poland, defended itself in a statement in which it claims that the brand was sold more than 20 years ago in several European countries, and that its distribution is governed by the laws in force in each country where it is present.

== Markets ==
Che cigarettes were or still are sold in the following countries: Luxembourg, Belgium, Netherlands, United Kingdom, France, Germany, Austria, Switzerland, Italy, Portugal, Poland, Slovenia, Russia, Japan, Chile, Brazil and Romania.

== See also ==
- Tobacco smoking
