= Tōru (given name) =

- Pronunciation: tooɾɯ (IPA)
- Gender: Male

Origin
- Origin: Japanese
- Meaning: Different meanings depending on the kanji used. Based on its pronunciation, the original meaning of "tōru" is "to pass or pierce through something."

Other names
- Alternative spelling: Toru (Kunrei-shiki) Toru (Nihon-shiki) Tōru, Toru, Tooru, Tohru (Hepburn)

Tōru is a masculine Japanese given name.

== Written forms ==
Tōru can be expressed with several kanji. Some examples:

- 徹, "penetrate"
- 透, "transparent"
- 享, "enjoy"
- 亨, "smoothly"
- 暢, "freely"

The name can also be written in hiragana とおる or katakana トオル.

== Notable people with the name ==
- Toru Abe (安部 徹; 1917–1993), Japanese actor
- Toru Arakawa (荒川 通; 1932–2015), Japanese karateka
- Toru Arase (荒瀬 徹; born 1935), Japanese water polo player
- Tōru Doi (土井 亨; born 1958), Japanese politician
- Tōru Fujisawa (藤沢 とおる; born 1967), Japanese manga artist
- Tōru Furusawa (古澤 徹; born 1962), Japanese voice actor
- Tōru Furuya (古谷 徹; born 1953), Japanese actor, voice actor and narrator
- Tōru Hashimoto (橋下 徹; born 1969), Governor of Osaka Prefecture
- Toru Itabashi (板橋 亨; born 1946), Japanese ice hockey player
- Toru Iwatani (岩谷 徹; born 1955), Japanese video game designer
- Toru Iwaya (岩谷 徹; born 1936), Japanese mezzotint engraver and painter
- Tōru Kakizoe (垣添 徹; born 1978), Japanese former sumo wrestler
- Toru Kobayashi (小林 徹), Japanese astronomer
- Tōru Matsumoto (松本徹) (born 1977), Japanese badminton player
- Tōru Nara (奈良 徹), Japanese voice actor
- Tōru Nimura (仁村 徹; born 1961), Japanese baseball player
- Tōru Ōhira (大平 透; 1929–2016), Japanese voice actor and narrator
- Toru Okajima (岡島 徹; born 1943), Japanese ice hockey player
- Tōru Ōkawa (大川 透; born 1960), Japanese actor, voice actor and narrator
- Toru "Tiger" Okoshi, Japanese-American trumpet player
- Tōru Shinohara (篠原 とおる; born 1936), Japanese manga artist
- Toru Takahashi (baseball) (高橋 徹; born 1987), Japanese baseball player
- Toru Takahashi (Internet) (高橋 徹; born 1941), Japanese computer network researcher and businessman
- Toru Takahashi (racing driver) (高橋 徹; 1960–1983), Japanese racing driver
- Toru Takasuka (高須賀 宣; born 1966), Japanese software entrepreneur
- Tōru Takemitsu (武満 徹; 1930–1996), Japanese composer and writer on aesthetics and music theory
- Toru Terasawa (寺沢 徹; 1935–2025), Japanese long-distance runner
- Tōru Toida (戸井田 徹; born 1951), Japanese politician
- Toru Toyoda (豊田 亨; 1968–2018), A perpetrator of the Tokyo subway sarin attack
- Toru Yamashita (山下 亨; born 1988), Japanese guitarist
- Toru Yano (矢野 通; born 1978), Japanese professional wrestler
- Tooru Yonaha (與那覇 徹; born 1976), Japanese folk singer
- Toru Yonezawa (米沢 徹; born 1958), Japanese tennis player
- Toru Yoshida (吉田 暢; born 1965), Japanese footballer and manager
- Toru Tsuzaki (津﨑 徹; born 1979), Japanese Researcher

== Fictional characters ==
- Tohru (トオル), in Jackie Chan Adventures
- Tohru (トオル), a character in Kare First Love
- Toru (トオル), also known as Todd Snap, in the Pokémon anime
- Toru (透龍), the main villain of JoJo's Bizarre Adventure, part 8: JoJolion
- Toru, in Chris Bradford's Young Samurai
- Tooru Amami (天美 透), in The World God Only Knows
- Tohru Adachi, in Persona 4
- Toru Asakura (浅倉 透), in The Idolmaster Shiny Colors
- Toru Egawa, in Business as Usual, a Finder Series fanfiction by Kadzuki_Fuchoin
- Tōru Hagakure (葉隠 透), in My Hero Academia
- Tōru Hikawa (氷川 透), Tory Froid, in MegaMan NT Warrior
- Tohru Honda (本田 透), in Fruits Basket
- Tōru Ichii (一井 透), in A Channel
- Toru Ishikawa in Horimiya
- Toru Kazama (風間 トオル), in Crayon Shin-chan
- Tohru Kobayashi (小林 トール), the titular draconian servant in Miss Kobayashi's Dragon Maid
- Toru Kouno (河野 亨), in Princess Princess
- Tōru Miyamae (宮前 透), in Seiren
- Tohru Mutou (武藤 徹), in Shiki
- Tōru Mutsuki (六月 透), in Tokyo Ghoul
- Toru Narita (成田 徹), in Hot Gimmick
- Tooru Oikawa (及川 徹), in Haikyū!! with the position of captain and setter from Aoba Johsai High
- Toru Okada (岡田 亨), in The Wind-Up Bird Chronicle
- Toru Oshikiri (押切 トオル), in the series of the same name by Junji Ito
- Tōru Rikiishi (力石 徹), in Ashita no Joe
- Toru Sato (トオル・サトウ), in the game Need for Speed: Most Wanted
- Tohru Suidohbashi (水道橋 徹), of Machine Robo Rescue.
- Tōru Watanabe (ワタナベ トオル), in Norwegian Wood
- Tōru Yasunaga (安永 透), in The Decay of the Angel

== See also ==
- Toru (disambiguation)
- Japanese name
