= Che (name) =

Che (or Ché) is a given name.

Notable people with the name include:

Che

- Che Arthur, American musician
- Che Baraka (born 1953), American mixed media artist
- Che Bunce (born 1975), New Zealand footballer
- Che Chen, American composer and multi-instrumentalist
- Che Clark (born 2003), New Zealand rugby union player
- Che Cockatoo-Collins (born 1975), Australian rules footballer
- Che Dalha (born 1958), Chinese politician of Tibetan ethnicity
- Che Engku Chesterina (born 1943), Indonesian ballerina and Malaysian royal
- Che Flores, American basketball referee
- Che Fu (born 1974), New Zealand musician
- Che Gardner (born 2003), English footballer
- Che Gossett, American writer, scholar, and archivist
- Che Guevara (1928–1967), Argentine Marxist revolutionary
- Che Hisamuddin Hassan (born 1972), Malaysian football player
- Che Holloway (born 1990), American actor
- Che Hope (born 2003), Welsh rugby union player
- Che Jon Fernandes (born 1971), Greek Paralympian athlete
- Che Ku Marzuki (born 1956), Malaysian football manager and player
- Che Lovelace (born 1969), Trinidadian artist
- Che Pope (born 1970), American record executive, record producer, and songwriter
- Che Ramos (born 1980), Filipina actress
- Che Selane, South African politician
- Che Smith (born 1977), better known as Rhymefest, American rapper and songwriter
- Che Wilson (born 1979), English footballer
- Che Zakaria Mohd Salleh, Malaysian politician

Ché

- Ché Adams (born 1996), English footballer
- Ché Ahn, (born 1956), American Christian pastor
- Ché Wolton Grant (born 1994), better known as AJ Tracey, British rapper, singer, songwriter, and record producer
- Ché Greenidge, Barbadian model and environmental activist
- Ché Mills (born 1982), English mixed martial artist
- Ché Nunnely (born 1999), Dutch footballer
- Ché Walker, English actor, playwright, theatre director, and teacher
