= Che Baraka =

American mixed media artist

Che Baraka (born 1953) is an American mixed media artist whose conceptional and abstract paintings have been exhibited across the United States. Baraka was born in Chicago, Illinois. His work has been included in numerous exhibitions and collections throughout the United States, Canada, and Mexico.

== Early life ==
Baraka moved to Jackson, Mississippi, when he was six. He later lived in San Antonio, Texas, and New Orleans, Louisiana. In Mississippi, Baraka "was exposed to the profound beginnings of America's Civil rights movement that had began [sic] in Birmingham Alabama with the young Baptist minister, Martin Luther King." Exeter Academy showed interest in the young artist and sent a scholar to recruit him.

His spiritual guide and first mentor was a young civil rights activist, Jesse Morris. Thanks to him, Baraka developed his creativity and expanded his views of the world.

== Education ==
Baraka attended the School of Visual Arts in Manhattan, New York, graduating with honors and a BFA. He received an MFA in Arts Administration at New York University.

== Quotation ==
My work is your inspiration and your inspiration is my work.
