= Shha with hook =

Cyrillic letter

Usage
- Writing system: Cyrillic
- Type: Alphabetic

Shha with hook (approximated in Unicode as Һ̡ һ̡/ꜧ), also referred to as heng, is a letter of the Cyrillic script formerly used in some alphabets in Kabardian and a 1908 alphabet for Chechen.

== Usage ==
Shha with hook was used in the Kabardian alphabet of Kazi Atazhukin in 1865, the alphabet of Lev Lopatinsky in 1890, and the alphabet of Pago Tambiev in 1906.

== Gallery ==
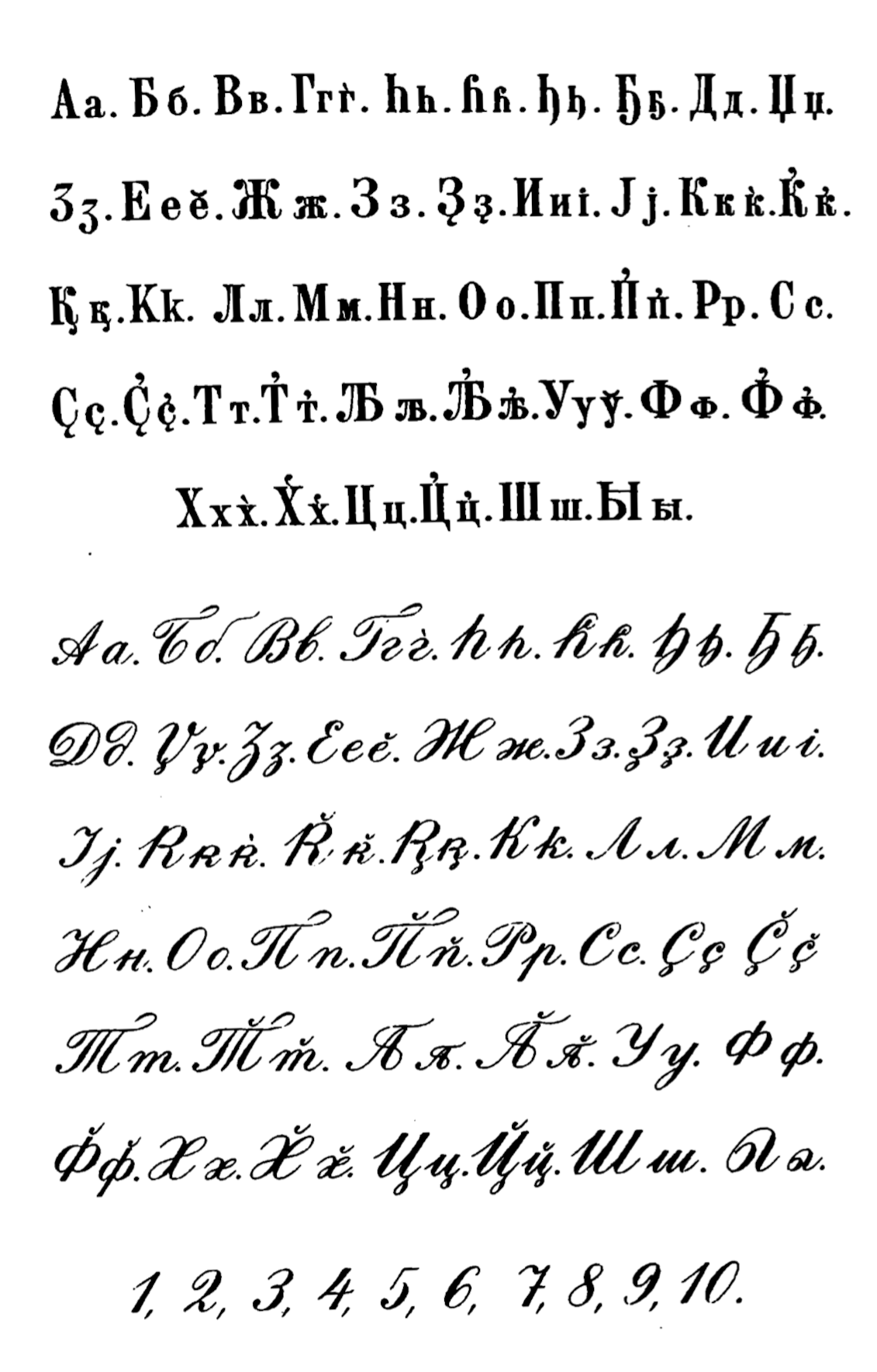
Kabardian alphabet with shha with hook (Tambiev, 1906).

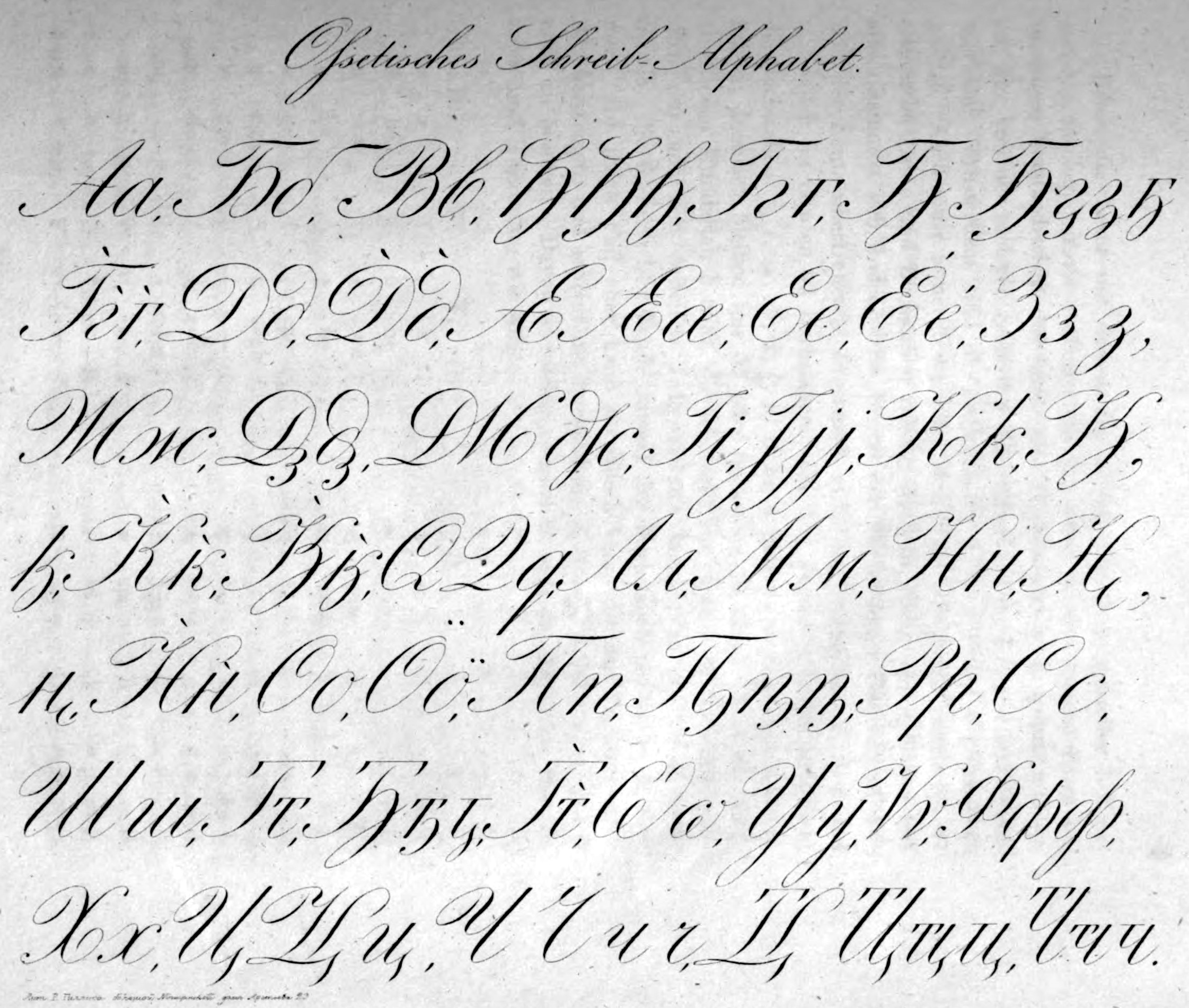
Cursive 1844 Ossetian alphabet of Sjögren, with heng,

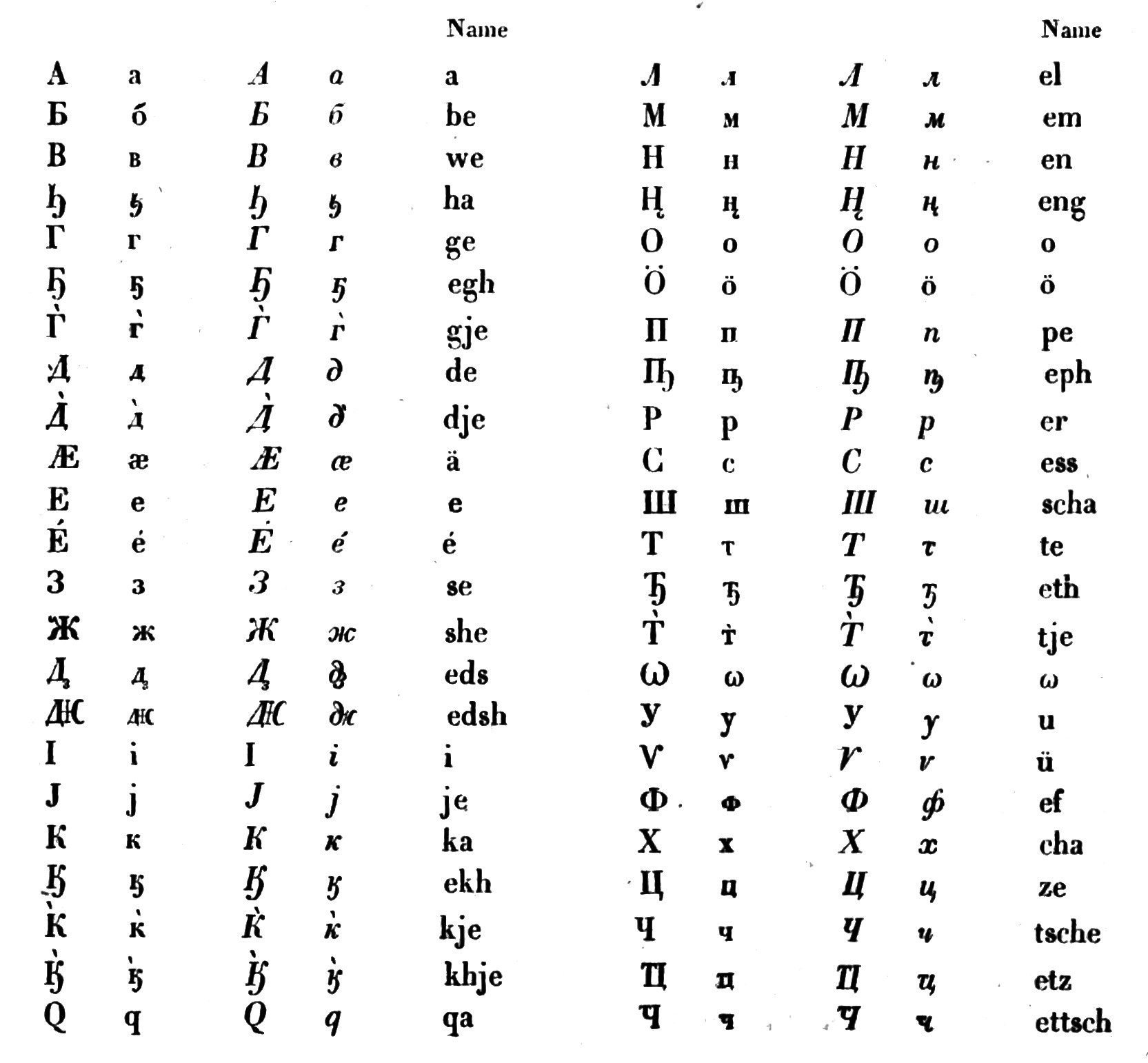
1844 Ossetian alphabet of Sjögren, with heng,

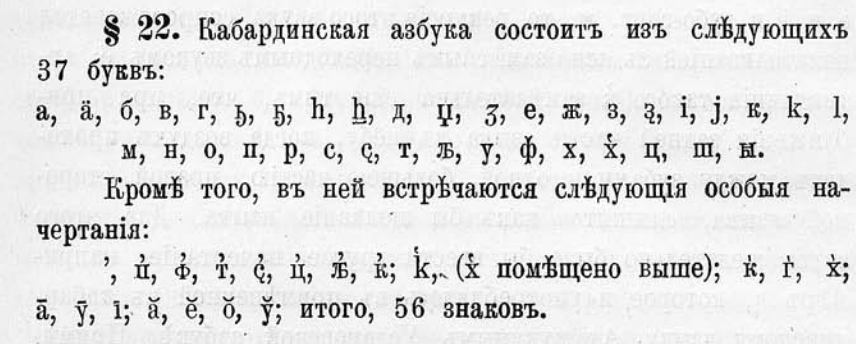
Kabardian alphabet with shha with hook (Lopatinsky 1890)

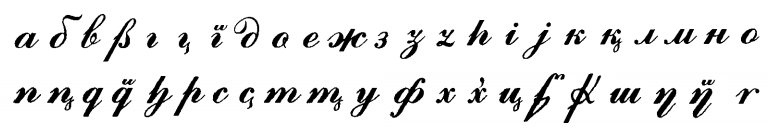
Kabardian alphabet with shha with hook (Atazhukin 1865)

== Computing codes ==
This letter has not yet been added to Unicode.

== See also ==
- Ꜧ ꜧ - Heng
- Һ һ - Shha
- Ԧ ԧ - Shha with descender
- Kabardian language
- Cyrillic script

== Sources ==
- Атажукин, Кази (1865). Кабардинская азбука (PDF) (in Russian). Тифлис: Военно-Походной типографии Главного Штаба Кавказской Армии.
- Лопатинский, Лев Григорьевич (1890). Русско-кабардинский словарь с указателем и краткой грамматикой (in Russian). Тифлис.
- Тамбиев, Паго Измаилович (1906). Кабардинская азбука (in Russian). Тифлис: Типография Канцелярии Наместника Его Императорского Величества на Кавказе.
