= Tohru Honda =

Fictional character in the manga and anime series Fruits Basket

- Fruits Basket character
- Tohru Honda, illustrated by Natsuki Takaya
- First appearance: "Chapter 1"; Fruits Basket; July 1998
- Last appearance: "Chapter 13"; Fruits Basket Another; April 2020
- Created by: Natsuki Takaya
- Voiced by: Japanese Hiroko Konishi (drama CD 1) Yui Horie (2001 anime, drama CDs 2–4) Manaka Iwami (2019 anime, drama CD 5); English Laura Bailey

In-universe information
- Spouse: Kyo Sohma
- Children: Hajime Sohma (son) And unnamed son and unnamed daughter
- Relatives: Kyoko Honda (mother, deceased); Katsuya Honda (father, deceased)

Tohru Honda (Japanese: 本田 透, Hepburn: Honda Tōru) is a fictional character and the main protagonist of the manga and anime series Fruits Basket, created by Natsuki Takaya. She is known for her cheerful optimism, altruistic nature, and deep empathy for others. Takaya created her with an unusual perspective on the world, to balance her empathy.

Tohru, age 16, is an orphaned high school student who, after meeting Yuki, Kyo, and Shigure Sohma, learns that thirteen members of the Sohma family are possessed by the animals of the Chinese zodiac and turn into their animal forms if they are embraced by anyone of the opposite sex or when their bodies come under a great deal of stress or are greatly weakened. As the series progresses, Tohru meets the rest of the zodiac and the family's mysterious head, Akito Sohma, and resolves to break the curse that burdens them.

== Development ==
According to Natsuki Takaya in interviews, Tohru Honda was the first character she created for the series, with Yuki and Kyo Sohma soon after. When asked how she came up with Tohru's personality and background, she said:

I thought that for a girl to accept other people's feelings so wholeheartedly, she'd have to have a slightly unusual way of looking at things so that she wouldn't be crushed by having so much empathy. But I still worried that I needed something else to flesh her out. And then the thought, "Oh, yeah--I'll make her use super-polite language, and use it incorrectly!" came to me all at once. After that, her character was completed in no time.

— Natsuki Takaya

Takaya gave Tohru a name normally used only for men because she likes to give masculine names to female characters "to balance them out." In addition, Takaya chose to have other characters address her as "Tohru-kun", using an honorific typically used for boys, because she thought it was "a more dignified form of address."

Laura Bailey, the English voice actor for Tohru, said in an interview that the aspect of Tohru's character she most related to was her optimism, while the most difficult was her formality. According to her, Akitaro Daichi, the director of the Japanese anime series, was particularly concerned that Tohru's "sweetness and formal nature didn't get lost in translation"; Bailey acknowledged that English does not have the same kind of speech formality as Japanese, but claimed Tohru's "humble nature can still be communicated through inflections and tone." Bailey reported using the original Japanese performance of Yui Horie as a basis for Tohru's mannerisms and inflections.

It is said that Tohru's father Katsuya Honda named her Tohru because "it brought out her hidden flavor, like adding salt to sweet things."

== Character outline ==
=== Personality ===
Tohru is depicted as polite, optimistic, extremely kind, and selfless. Several other characters, including her friends Kyo, Rin, and Hanajima, tell her she needs to look out for her own interests and not shoulder everyone else's burdens. At the start of the series, she is living in a tent rather than staying with her friends, Arisa Uotani and Saki Hanajima, to avoid being a burden to them, and she has an after-school job as an office janitor to pay her tuition fees so that her grandfather does not have to. Yuki once describes her as not the sort who sees her life as a "glass half-empty." Tohru is so kind-hearted that she cannot make herself say mean things while playing a wicked stepsister in a class production of Cinderella, and when her mother told her the bedtime story of how the cat was excluded from the Chinese zodiac, in sympathy she declared she wished to be born in the year of the cat.

Tohru describes herself as an excellent artist who loves cooking and cleaning. In the original Japanese, Tohru habitually speaks formally (see Honorific speech in Japanese), but not always correctly. She picked up this habit from her dead father, Katsuya, after he died when she was three, as a way of replacing him in her mother's eyes and from her father's family's statements that she was probably the daughter of a man her mother had an affair with. Tohru tends to be especially concerned for people with minor illnesses. This comes from the circumstances of her father's death, when Katsuya was originally diagnosed with a fever but eventually died of pneumonia.

She was raised by her mother, Kyoko, until Kyoko died in a car accident shortly after Tohru entered high school, a few months before the series starts. Tohru treasures her mother's photograph and vowed at her death to keep Kyoko the most important person in her life. Tohru is distressed whenever she feels she is being "unfaithful" to her mother, for example, when she gets failing marks on end-of-term exams, thus endangering her promise to graduate high school, or when she falls in love with Kyo. Tohru eventually realizes that her vow is an attempt to cling to the past, and that Kyoko would have wanted her to move on and fall in love with someone else.

=== Life with the Sohmas ===
A few months before the series begins, Tohru's mother died in a car accident, leaving her an orphan in the care of her grandfather. When his house needs remodeling, she moves into a tent on land that turns out to belong to the Sohmas. When her tent is buried in a landslide during a rainstorm, Shigure convinces her to move in with him and Yuki as housekeeper in exchange for room and board. As she settles in, Kyo Sohma arrives to challenge Yuki to a fight. In the confusion, Tohru accidentally embraces him and he transforms into a cat, and when she stumbles into Yuki and Shigure, they transform as well into a Rat and Dog, respectively. The Sohmas explain that their family is cursed, and they are possessed by spirits of the Chinese zodiac plus the cat legend says would have been included if it had not been tricked by the Rat into missing the induction feast (see Zodiac origin stories). Tohru promises to keep their secret, under the threat of having her memories of them erased—a compromise agreed to by Akito Sohma, the mysterious head of the family, who orders Kyo to live with Shigure as well.

Tohru is soon friends with the three Sohmas—especially her classmates Yuki and Kyo, who she hopes will become friends themselves—and they in turn are slowly affected by her presence. Yuki is especially touched by Tohru's request that, if her memory is suppressed, he will remain her friend, which no one had asked him before. Kyo initially appears to dislike Tohru, but he, like Yuki, is "drawn" to her kind heart and gentle demeanor. However, his inability to express his feelings results in frequent impulsive angry comments to Tohru, for which he usually ends up apologizing. Gradually Tohru meets the other cursed members of the Sohma family, and through her kindness and sympathy is able to help Hatori, Ayame, Kisa, Hiro, and Ritsu. Her encouragement to Kisa also helps Yuki face his own self-doubts and accept becoming president of the student council; in addition he knows, by a cap Tohru treasures, that she is the lost little girl he once led home, an act that showed him that he was not as unneeded by others as Akito claimed. Tohru becomes particularly close to Kyo after his foster-father Kazuma Sohma forces him to reveal the monstrous "true form" of his curse; although initially repulsed, Tohru stays with him even after he violently tries to push her away. Both Yuki and Kyo fall in love with her, though neither tells her.

As she learns more about the zodiac curse, Tohru becomes increasingly distressed by its cost to her friends—especially Momiji Sohma's separation from his little sister, Momo, who does not even know (but suspects) they are siblings, and her friend Arisa's longing for Kureno Sohma, who cannot see her because he is bound to Akito. When she learns that the feared Akito is the "god" of the zodiac and of the bet he made with Kyo, which could result in the cat being confined for life, she resolves to break the curse. Tohru asks for help from Kazuma, Rin, and Kureno. Despite setbacks and being warned off by Rin—who also seeks to break the curse, in order to free Hatsuharu—Tohru refuses to give up her goal. She eventually receives encouragement and hints from Shigure, who is using Tohru to weaken the curse for his own reasons.

Meanwhile, Tohru's feelings for Kyo develop and she eventually admits he is the Sohma she wants the most to free, because she loves him. This, however, only distresses her further, as she feels she is being unfaithful to her mother's memory. However, when Tohru finally confesses to Kyo, he tells her he knew her mother when he was a child, and that he could have saved Kyoko from the car that killed her except it would have revealed his curse and Kyoko's final words "I won't forgive you!" (Later it is understood that she meant to say "I won't forgive you if you don't take care of Tohru!") But Tohru doesn't believe her mother would say that, and if she did, she would have to go against it because she loves him. Unable in his guilt to accept Tohru's feelings, he says her love is an illusion and runs away. As she follows him, she meets Akito, who believes that Tohru's kindness to and acceptance of the cursed zodiac members has made them unfaithful to her, weakening their "bond" to the point that Momiji and Hiro have been freed from the curse. As she angrily confronts her, however, Tohru realizes that she is trapped by the past as much as she herself has been, by clinging to her mother's memory, and she extends her hand in friendship to Akito and introduces herself as a new start. However, before Akito can accept, Tohru falls down a nearby cliff when the ground collapses in the rain. The accident makes Kyo realize how much he values Tohru, and also allows Akito to finally break away from the roles she has held for most of her life.

Tohru survives the fall and is hospitalized. As she recovers, Akito accepts Tohru's friendship, and comes to accept both the person she is, instead of the god she has believed her father wished her to be, and the woman she was born as, instead of the man she was raised to be. Meanwhile, Yuki, who has realized that what he wants from Tohru is an unconditional "motherly" love, not the love of a woman, convinces Kyo to reconcile with Tohru when she is discharged from the hospital. But Tohru takes off in a dash once she see Kyo because she feels as if she has been rejected, but Kyo chases after her. After catching up with her, Kyo confesses his feelings for her. This acceptance of the cat, the first friend of the god of the zodiac, breaks the zodiac curse and all the Sohmas are freed. In the last chapter, she and Kyo are shown packing to move to another city to continue his martial arts training, so that eventually he can inherit Kazuma's dojo, and in the final pages, it is revealed that they got married and had a son and a granddaughter.

== Reception ==
=== Popularity ===
Tohru won the Best Female Character award at the 24th Anime Grand Prix in 2002; she ranked ninth in the same category at the 42nd edition. From 2020 to 2022, Tohru was nominated at the Anime Trending Awards for Girl of the Year and Couple or Ship of the Year with Kyo Soma, winning the latter category in 2022. At the 4th Crunchyroll Anime Awards in 2020, Tohru was nominated for Best Protagonist while Laura Bailey's performance as Tohru was one of the nominees for Best Voice Artist Performance (English); Tohru and Bailey were nominated at the sixth edition for Best Girl and Best Voice Artist Performance (English), respectively.

=== Critical response ===
Tohru has been cited by reviewers as key to the appeal of the series, especially the manga version. Her cheerfulness and sympathy for other characters is frequently commented on: "Tohru is the essence of cheerfulness and faces hardships with a positive attitude while being extremely compassionate to everyone around her." However while "Tohru is notorious in the series for being happy and cheerful even in times of great taxation", as a reviewer at Anime News Network put it, her characterization is seen as more complex than that even at the start of the series, and more so as series progresses. Her unusual personality is seen by reviewers as a product of her upbringing:

[Her parents'] approach to family life and parenting is informed by their own failings as members of destroyed families, and the result is exactly the kind of family that would produce someone like Tohru.

— Carl Kimlinger, Anime News Network

She is also seen as resembling her mother as she grows up.
