= List of Ojarumaru characters =

This is a list of the characters in the Ojarumaru anime series.

== Main characters ==
=== Ojarumaru Sakanoue ===
Voiced by: Hiroko Konishi (Japanese; Series 1-3), Chinami Nishimura (Japanese; Series 4-present)

Ojarumaru Sakanoue (坂ノ上 おじゃる丸, Sakanoue Ojarumaru) is the title character and main protagonist of the series and is a five-year-old Heian era prince. Born to a noble family in Yōsei-kai (妖精界, lit. Fairy World), he is spoiled, whimsical, laid-back, and a little selfish. He speaks politely and uses Maro (マロ) as his preferred first-person pronoun; he uses Sochi (ソチ) as his pronoun for other people. He ends most of his sentences with the archaic polite copulas de ojaru (でおじゃる), ka no (かの), nou (のう), ja (じゃ), ja no (じゃの), or no ja (のじゃ), along with the archaic tetamo (てたも). During the beginning of the series, he accidentally time-warps over to modern Japan and lives in Gekkō-chō (月光町, lit. "Moonlight Town") with Kazuma Tamura and his parents. Later in the series, he time-warps back and forth between the present time and the Heian era through the full moon's reflection at the Tsukiyo Ike (月夜池, lit. "Moonlit Night Pond"). He often relaxes on his 3-piece set, which consists of a pedestal, a byōbu, and an armrest. His favorite food is pudding and first tried it when Ai made it for him. He wears a fourth-dimensional eboshi hat, which he often uses to store rare objects. He dislikes using his energy, water, and his fiancée, Princess Okame. He tends to utter Oja (おじゃ) when surprised, confused, or getting someone's attention and Ojazozo (おじゃぞぞ) whenever he sees Okame. Unlike most of the characters in the series, he does not address his acquaintances with honorifics, with the exception of Ai (as Ai-chan), Komachi (as Komachi-chan), and Otome (as Otome-sensei).

Enoki Films gave him the name "Prince Mackaroo" in English language materials.

=== Denbo Sanjuurou ===
Voiced by: Rie Iwatsubo (Japanese; Series 1-7), Narumi Satou (Japanese; Series 8-present)

Denbo Sanjuurou (電ボ三十郎, Denbo Sanjūrō) is a firefly, referred to as a Densho-Botaru (電書ボタル). He was born in the 30th generation of the Densho-Botaru family, which has been used by the Sakanoue family for generations. He delivers messages and reports between Yōsei-kai and the present time. He is Ojarumaru's caretaker and was asked by Ojarumaru's parents to look after him in Gekkō-chō. He is very polite and addresses everyone with the honorific sama (様). He ends most of his sentences with the polite copulas masu (ます) or de gozaimasu (でございます). He is quick to fall in love with insects, animals, food, plants, and even objects, but gets rejected most of the time. His recurring girlfriend is Marie's parrot named Akemi. He loves onigiri and his special technique for making them is Hissatsu Nidan Nigiri (必殺二段にぎり).

In Enoki Films materials, "Cyber-fly" is the character's name.

=== Kazuma Tamura ===
Voiced by: Yuriko Fuchizaki (Japanese)

Kazuma Tamura (田村カズマ, Tamura Kazuma) is Ojarumaru's best friend. He is 8 years old and is a 2nd grader at Gekkō Elementary School (月光小学校, Gekkō Shōgakkō; lit. Moonlight Elementary School). He is the only child of Ai and Makoto. He is a very good athlete and loves to play soccer. He is really good friends with Ojarumaru, almost like brothers. He loves to collect all kinds of rocks and has a collection of them in his room. He is afraid of dogs. Ojarumaru always rides on his back or his backpack whenever they are out together.

In Enoki Films materials his name is Cosmo.

=== Kooni Trio ===
The Oni Child Trio (子鬼トリオ, Kooni Trio) consists of three young oni, who were sent by their father, Great King Enma, to retrieve his scepter from Ojarumaru. They constantly come up with plans to retrieve the scepter, but they all fail due to Ojarumaru outsmarting them. Sometimes they are seen wearing various disguises, which are primarily set to fit the episode's plot, as part of their plans to trick Ojarumaru into returning the scepter. Since they left their battle sticks at Enma World (エンマ界 Enma Kai), they use giant cutlery as weapons.

In Enoki Films materials the name of the group is the "The Scamps".

=== Aobee ===
Voiced by: Kazuya Ichijō (Japanese)

Aobee (アオベエ) is the leader of the Oni Child Trio. He is seven years old. He looks like a tough guy, but is actually a soft-hearted boy. His preferred first-person pronoun Washi (儂), despite his young age, and ends most of his sentences with the archaic polite copula de gonsu (でゴンス). He has a crush on Komachi. He uses a knife as a weapon.

His Enoki Films name is Blue Joe.

=== Kisuke ===
Voiced by: Yuji Ueda (Japanese)

Kisuke (キスケ) is the third member of the Oni Child Trio and has a chick-like appearance. He is five years old. He is a crybaby and uses a spoon as a weapon. His preferred first-person pronoun is Ora (おら) and sometimes as Kii-kun (キーくん) (a variant of his own name). He ends most of his sentences with pii (ピィ) and also tends to exclaim it at random. A running gag throughout the series has him often mistaken as a chick and he would shout "Kii-kun is not a chick ppii!" (キーくんヒヨコじゃないっピィ! Kii-kun hiyoko janai ppii!).

His Enoki Films name is Khakie.

=== Akane ===
Voiced by: Omi Minami (Japanese)

Akane (アカネ) is the second member of the Oni Child Trio. She is six years old. Enoki Films describes her general behavior as "short tempered" and "fast talking", and the company states that she is a tomboy. Her preferred first-person pronoun is Atai (あたい). She is unaware that Green Oni has a crush on her. She uses a fork as a weapon.

According to Enoki Films, her fondness for Aobee means that she becomes "sweet" around him.

Her Enoki Films name is Scarlett.

== Present day characters ==
=== Tamura family ===
==== Tomio Tamura / Tommy ====
Voiced by: Toshiya Ueda (Japanese), Yuji Ueda (Japanese; Young), Harumi Ikoma (Japanese; Boyhood)

Tomio Tamura (田村富美男, Tamura Tomio), mostly known by the nickname Tommy (トミー Tomī), is Kazuma's grandfather and Makoto's father. He is seventy years old. He lives in a log cabin. An historian, he loves to study old folk tales and fairy tales. He is very interested in Great King Enma's scepter. He also loves inventing mechanical robot dolls that can do certain things, such as the "Mechanical Music Doll" (からくり音楽人形 Karakuri Ongaku Ningyō) that makes people behave in a certain way depending on the music playing, and the "Mechanical Dessert Doll" (からくりデザート人形 Karakuri Dezāto Ningyō) that produces many different desserts.

In Enoki Films materials, "Tommy" is the character's name.

==== Ai Tamura ====
Voiced by: Satomi Koorogi (Japanese)

Ai Tamura (田村愛, Tamura Ai) is Kazuma's mother and Makoto's wife. She is thirty-two years old. She is a housewife. She is mostly seen wearing an apron.

==== Makoto Tamura ====
Voiced by: Kazuya Ichijō (Japanese), Akemi Okamura (Japanese; Boyhood)

Makoto Tamura (田村マコト, Tamura Makoto) is Kazuma's father and Ai's husband. He is thirty-six years old. He is a salaryman. He is soft-spoken and likes to drink beer.

==== Sayuri Tamura / Sally ====
Voiced by: Harumi Ikoma (Japanese), Yuka Imai (Japanese; Young, first voice), Haruhi Terada (Japanese; Young, second voice)

Sayuri Tamura (田村小百合, Tamura Sayuri), mostly known by the nickname Sally (サリー Sarī), is Tomio's wife, Makoto's mother, and Kazuma's grandmother. She is deceased and only appears in flashbacks and old photos. In the past, Mariko, her sister, lied to Tommy that she didn't like him, so that Sayuri could marry him.

==== Jun Koshifubuki ====
Voiced by: Mitsuki Saiga (Japanese)

Jun Koshifubuki (越吹雪ジュン, Koshifubuki Jun) is Tommy's sister-in-law and Makoto's aunt.

=== Alisa ===
Voiced by: Haruhi Terada (Japanese)

Alisa (アリサ, Arisa) is Makoto's cousin and Sayuri's niece.

=== Kazuma's classmates ===
==== Kintarō Sakata / Kelly / Kim ====
Voiced by: Harumi Ikoma (Japanese; Series 1-2, 4-present), Rika Komatsu (Japanese; Series 3)

Kintarō Sakata (坂田金太郎, Sakata Kintarō), mostly known referred to as Kin-chan (金ちゃん), is a boy in Kazuma's class at school and is his best friend. He is a kind-hearted boy and loves eating lollipops. He tends to end most of his sentences with desū (ですー), a cute variant of desu (です). His family is very wealthy and lives in a mansion on top of the Sakata Apartment (坂田マンション Sakata Manshon), which is owned by his father. He owns a stuffed doll named Tsukkii, who also becomes real in a bigger form at the Moonlight Pond. He wears a Haragake that has the word "Gold" (金 Kin) on it.

==== Komachi Onono ====
Voiced by: Chinami Nishimura (Japanese)

Komachi Ono (小野小町, Ono Komachi) is a girl in Kazuma's class who is very fashionable. She is often seen carrying a hand mirror to check her looks. She has a fear of insects, including Denbo. However, in later episodes she doesn't get scared of him and sometimes talks to him when he's around. Her family owns a beauty salon, which is also their home, called the "Komachi Hair Salon" (小町ヘアサロン Komachi Hea Saron). Occasionally, she ends up making the activities she does an instant boom in Moonlight Town, such as playing a game of Shiritori. Her name comes from the Japanese Heian period waka poet named Ono no Komachi.

==== Kentarō Iwashimizu ====
Voiced by: Akemi Okamura

Kentarō Iwashimizu (石清水健太郎, Iwashimizu Kentarō), mostly referred to as Iwashimizu-kun (石清水くん), is another one of Kazuma's classmates. Although intelligent, he is very strict and tends to criticize people. He owns a goldfish, Kin-chan No. 28, which he got from Kin-chan.

=== Marie's Mansion ===
==== Mariko Jūmonji / Marie ====
Voiced by: Ai Satou (Japanese)

Mariko Jūmonji (十文字麻璃子, Jūmonji Mariko), mostly known by the nickname Marie (マリー Marī), is Tommy's seventy-three-year-old friend. A fashionable dresser from an old noble family, she frequently enjoys tea with Tommy. She always wears her trademarked pointed glasses and purple hat with feathers on it. She lives in a mansion and owns a boarding house, which Sachiyo Usui, Ken, Otome, and the Haunted House Director live in. She opposes Denbo dating her parrot, Akemi. She has been friends with Yoshiko Tanaka since childhood.

In Enoki Films materials, "Marie" is the character's name.

==== Sachiyo Usui ====
Voiced by: Azusa Nakao (Japanese)

Sachiyo Usui (うすいさちよ, Usui Sachiyo) is a manga artist. She is twenty-eight years old. She usually spends her time drawing Shōjo manga to submit to a magazine. Her drawings are very distinct, but are rather scary-looking to the other characters in the series. She sometimes drinks tea and has a handful of teabags hanging near the ceiling in her room.

==== Otome-sensei ====
Voiced by: Yuri Amano (Japanese; Series 1-2), Yuka Imai (Japanese; Series 3-19), Atsumi Tanezaki (Japanese; Series 20-present)

Otome-sensei (乙女先生) is a ballerina who teaches ballet at Marie's mansion. She is twenty-two years old. She has a beautiful appearance and is well-liked by some people, such as Ojarumaru.

==== Ken ====
Voiced by: Yūsuke Numata (Japanese)

Ken (ケン) is a freeter who often changes jobs. He is twenty-five years old. He is spirited, but tends to get clumsy, which causes him to get fired from his part-time jobs. His part-time jobs range from working at a fish market to paving bricks.

==== Mr. Director ====
Voiced by: Kenjiro Tsuda (Japanese)

Mr. Director (館長さん, Kanchō-san) is a humanoid obake who is a haunted house director only during the summer. He has pale skin and his appearance looks similar to Count Dracula. He talks to invisible ghosts.

=== The Moonlight Town Tiny Things Club ===
The Moonlight Town Tiny Things Club (月光町ちっちゃいものクラブ, Gekkō Chō Chitchai Mono Kurabu) is a club founded by Ojarumaru. All of the members consist of tiny species, except for Ojarumaru who is the only one that is larger than anyone else in the club. There is a fan club for it which Nikorinbou founded, while Okorinbou serves as the president. The club members gather for meetings to either discuss a certain topic, do an activity such as Golf, or help out with one of the characters (who are not part of the club) with a certain task.

==== Kimiko of the Big Dipper ====
Voiced by: Kaori Nazuka

Kimiko of the Big Dipper (北斗七星の公子, Hokutoshichisei no Kimiko), mostly referred to as Kimi-chan (公ちゃん) is a hamster who works for Cold Tessai since the episode "Kimi-chan Finds Happiness", and tells fortunes by spinning a wheel. She is the third member of the club (originally the second). She has brown stars on her back and cannot tell fortunes if they're gone. Unlike most of the animal and insect characters in the series, she communicates by making squeaking noises, however, the other characters don't have trouble understanding her.

==== Katatsumuri Pitt ====
Voiced by: Ryō Naitō (Japanese)

Katatsumuri Pitt (カタツムーリ・ピット, Katatsumūri· Pitto), mostly referred to as Katapi (カタピー) is a snail who is from France. He is the fourth member of the club (originally the third). He talks slowly. He is good friends with Kobayashi Tea and often hangs out with him.

==== Kame Kameda ====
Voiced by: Satomi Koorogi (Japanese)

Kame Kameda (亀田カメ, Kameda Kame) is a turtle. She is one thousand one hundred eleven years old. She is the fifth member of the club (originally the fourth). She is Tome's younger sister.

==== Tome Kamada ====
Voiced by: Sataomi Koorogi (Japanese)

Tome Kameda (亀田トメ, Kameda Tome) is also a turtle. She is one thousand twelve years old. She is the sixth member of the club (originally the fifth) She is Kame's older sister.

==== The God of Poverty ====
Voiced by: Ayaka Saitō (Japanese)

The God of Poverty (貧乏神, Binbōgami), mostly referred to as Poverty-chan (貧ちゃん Bin-chan) is a tiny god that causes poverty and depression. It is seventeen years old. It is the seventh member of the club (originally the sixth) and first joined in the episode "Poverty-chan Participates in the Club". Although it looks innocent and is soft-spoken, it likes to depress people by either touching or hanging on to them. Its presence at the Mangan Shrine has caused it to be damaged, much to Okorinbou and Nikorinbou's concern. It has a board shaped like a chocolate bar called the "Motivation Board" (板やる気 Ita Yaruki) that causes the user to feel motivated. It cannot be seen by humans.

==== Sabire Kitajima ====
Voiced by: Ayaka Saitō

=== The Moonlight Town Tiny, Tiny Things Club ===
==== Kera Ueno Nokai ====
Voiced by: Tomokazu Seki

Kera Ueno Nokai (ケラ上野之介) is a mole cricket. He is the first member of the club.

==== Shimizu ====
Voiced by: Ryōko Nagata

Shimizu (清水) is an earthworm. He is the second member of the club. His hobby is to read.

==== Rikie ====
Voiced by: Yuuko Sanpei

Rikie (リキエ) is a frog. He is the third member of the club. His hobby is to swim.

==== Nomi Nomiyama ====
Voiced by: Kotono Mitsuishi

Nomi Nomiyama (野見山ノミ, Nomiyama Nomi) is a flea. She is the fourth member of the club.

==== Tomi Nomiyama ====
Voiced by: Kotono Mitsuishi

Tomi Nomiyama (野見山トミ, Nomiyama Tomi) is also a flea. She is the fifth member of the club

==== Namepi ====
Voiced by: Natsuyo Atarashi (Series 6-10), Shira Yuki Ōka (Series 11-present

Namepi (ナメピー, Namepī) is a slug. She is the sixth member of the club. Like Katapi, she is from France.

==== Atsushi ====
Voiced by: Yumi Higashino

Atsushi (アツシ), also known by the nickname Amenbo (あめんぼ), is a water strider. He is the seventh member of the club. Like Rikie, he likes to swim.

=== Mangan Shrine ===
==== Okorinbou ====
Voiced by: Yuji Ueda (Japanese)

Okorinbou (オコリン坊), also known as Okobou (オコ坊), is a Komainu of the Mangan Shrine. He has a short temper and is obsessed with earning money in order to repair the shrine since it is damaged. His get-rich-quick plans always end up failing. He wears a small offertory box on his back. He has a crush on Jessica. He is the president of the Moonlight Town Tiny Things Club Fan Club (月光町ちっちゃいものクラブファンクラブ Gekkō Chō Chicchai Mono Kurabu Fan Kurabu). His name comes from the Japanese word okoru (怒る "to get angry").

==== Nikorinbou ====
Voiced by: Omi Minami (Japanese)

Nikorinbou (ニコリン坊), also known as Nikobou (ニコ坊), is Okorinbou's sister. She is much more calm and sweet than Okorinbou. She is always involved with her brother's get-rich-quick plans. She also wears a small offertory box on her back. She is the founder of the Moonlight Town Tiny Things Club Fan Club. Her name comes from the Japanese onomatopoeic word nikoniko (ニコニコ "smilingly").

==== The God of Poverty ====
See the Moonlight Town Tiny Things Club section.

==== Sprout ====
Voiced by: Takashi Sasano

=== Moonlight Town citizens ===
==== Mr. Kawakami ====
Voiced by: Norihisa Mori (Japanese)

Mr. Kawakami (川上さん, Kawakami-san) is a salaryman. He is always running late for work. When not going to work on foot, he tries to ride a bus, but often misses it. He once had an alter ego, Anpan Mask (アンパン仮面 Anpan Kamen), to go around town giving anpan to starving people.

==== Icchoku Honda ====
Voiced by: Kazuya Ichijō (Japanese)

Icchoku Honda (本田一直, Honda Icchoku), also known as Honda-sensei (本田先生) is Kazuma's homeroom teacher at his elementary school and Asako's husband. He is thirty-one years old. He loves to exercise and jogs every morning. He wears a suit while at school, but usually wears an orange jogging sweatshirt when not at school.

==== Asako Honda ====
Voiced by: Kaori Asoh (Japanese)

Asako Honda (本田朝子, Honda Asako), also known as Asa-chan (朝ちゃん) is Icchoku's wife. She is twenty years old. The daughter of a newsagent, she has a career in delivering newspapers.

==== Kobayashi Cha ====
Voiced by: Masaaki Tsukada (Japanese; Series 1-15), Daisuke Yamazaki (Japanese; Series 16-present)

Kobayashi Cha (小林茶, Kobayashi Tea) is an old poet who writes Haiku poems. He loves drinking tea. The Oni Child Trio sometimes visits him to learn how to write Haiku poems. He and Katapi have been traveling for 50 years. He has an alter ego, Japan Tea Mask (日本茶仮面 Nippon Cha Kamen) to clean the town by picking up trash. His name comes from the Japanese poet, Kobayashi Issa.

==== Seigetsu Reitetsusai ====
Voiced by: Hiroshi Takahashi (Japanese)

Seigetsu Reitetsusai (冷徹斎星月, Reitetsusai Seigetsu) is a fortune teller.

==== Komachi Papa ====
Voiced by: Kohei Kowada (Japanese)

Komachi Papa (小町パパ) is Komachi's father. He is the manager of the KOMACHI Hair Salon.

==== Komachi Mama ====
Voiced by: Haruhi Terada (Japanese)

Komachi Mama (小町ママ) is Komachi's mother. She works at the KOMACHI Hair Salon.

==== Hoshiemon Hiraki ====
Voiced by: Eiji Takemoto (Japanese)

Hoshiemon Hiraki (開干ゑ門, Hiraki Hoshiemon), also known as Kanbutsu-san (カンブツさん), is the manager of a dried goods shop.
