= Hajime Watanabe (animator) =

Japanese animator and character designer (born 1957)

Hajime Watanabe (渡辺 はじめ, Watanabe Hajime; born 1957) is a Japanese animator and character designer. His debut as a chief character designer was with Hime-chan's Ribbon, and he has frequently worked with Akitaro Daichi on anime titles.

== Works ==
- Akazukin Chacha:Character Design, Animation Director (episodes 14, 26, 40, 51, 65)
- Animation Runner Kuromi:Character Design, Animation Director
- Carried by the Wind: Tsukikage Ran:Character Design
- Cross Fight B-Daman:Assistant producer
- Cross Fight B-Daman eS:Assistant producer
- Ginga e Kickoff!!:Character Design, Chief Animation Director
- Hiatari Ryōkō!:Animation Director
- Hime-chan's Ribbon:Character Design, Chief Animation Director, Animation Director (episodes 1, 6, 11, 17, 23, 26, 29, 32, 35, 39, 42, 45, 51, 56, 60)
- Kaleido Star:Character Design, Chief Animation Director
- Kero Kero Chime:Main Character Design
- Kiteretsu Daihyakka:Character Design, Chief Animation Director
- Kodomo no Omocha:Character Design
- Les Misérables: Shōjo Cosette:Character Design
- Now and Then, Here and There:Key Animation (episodes 1, 13)
- Nurse Angel Ririka SOS:Character Design, Chief Animation Director, Animation Director (episodes 6, 11, 15–16, 24)
- Ojarumaru:Character Design
- School Rumble:Character Design, Animation Director (Opening; Ending; episode 1)
- Tamayura:Animation Director (episode 2, 4)
- Isekai no Seikishi Monogatari:Character Design, Chief Animation Director
- Uta Kata:Ending Illustration (episode 8)
- Captain Tsuasa (2018): Character Design
