= Reiko Yasuhara =

Japanese actress, voice actress and singer

Reiko Yasuhara (安原 麗子, Yasuhara Reiko; born October 18, 1969) is a Japanese actress, voice actress and singer from Yokohama. She was a member of the group Shoujotai (少女隊).

== Filmography ==
=== Anime ===
- Animation Runner Kuromi (Hamako Shihonmatsu)
- Ashita no Nadja (Collette Preminger)
- Carried by the Wind: Tsukikage Ran (Tsukikage Ran)
- Fruits Basket (Saki Hanajima, Kyoko Honda)
- Grrl Power (Narrator)
- Jubei-chan and Jubei-chan 2 (Mikage Tsumura)
- Mushishi (Yahagi)
- Now and Then, Here and There (Abelia; also performed the series end theme)

=== Dubbing ===
- Detective Dee: The Four Heavenly Kings, Empress Wu Zetian (Carina Lau)
- Paul Blart: Mall Cop, Amy Anderson (Jayma Mays)
- Young Detective Dee: Rise of the Sea Dragon, Empress Wu Zetian (Carina Lau)
