= Magical Adventure =

Magical Adventure may refer to:

- Magical Adventure! A Wiggly Movie, the international title of the 1997 Australian film The Wiggles Movie
- Winx Club 3D: Magical Adventure, a 2010 Italian film
- Bayala: A Magical Adventure
