= Jubei Yagyu (disambiguation) =

Yagyū Jūbei Mitsuyoshi (1607–1650) was a famous Japanese samurai.

Jubei Yagyu is also the name of:

- Jubei Yagyu (Samurai Shodown), a character in the Samurai Shodown fighting games
- Yagyu Sekishusai Jubei and Yagyu Akane Jubei, characters in Onimusha video games
- Yagyu Jubei, a character in the Yaiba manga/anime
- A character in the Jubei-chan: The Ninja Girl anime
- A character in the Hyakka Ryōran Samurai Girls anime
