= Elf Princess Rane =

Japanese original video animation (OVA)

妖精姫レーン (Yōsei Hime Rēn)
- Genre: Comedy, Fantasy, Romance
- Original video animation
- Directed by: Akitaro Daichi
- Produced by: Masao Mochizuki; Akira Takano
- Written by: Taishi Yamazaki
- Music by: Harukichi Yamamoto
- Studio: Dangun Pictures
- Released: October 27, 1995 – January 26, 1996
- Episodes: 2

Elf Princess Rane (妖精姫レーン, Yōsei Hime Rēn), also known as Fairy Princess Ren, is an anime OVA directed by Akitaro Daichi. It was released on VHS and DVD in North America by Media Blasters. The North American release contains a preview for a third OVA episode that was never produced; it's listed as an "evil preview."

== Plot ==
Gou has vowed to find the legendary treasure of Salamander. Searching for it he meets Rane, a fairy, who is looking for the four treasures of Heart. Gou's childhood friend Mari is frustrated with Gou running after treasures, but befriends with another fairy Lean. Gou and Rane's treasure hunt messes with a secret project led by Mari's father. It turns out Salamander isn't what Gou thought it was in the first place...

== Characters ==
Gou Takarada (宝田 ゴウ, Takarada Gou)
Mari Yumenokata (夢乃館 真理, Yumenokata Mari)
Rane Chepanikorus (レーン・ツェパニコーラス, Rēn Chepanikōrasu)
Leen Kyami Kuunyo (リーン・キャミ・クーニョ, Rīn Kyami Kūnyo)

Haruki Takarada (宝田 春姫, Takarada Haruki)
Natsuki Takarada (宝田 夏姫, Takarada Natsuki)
Miyuki Takarada (宝田 冬姫, Takarada Miyuki)
Takuma Zenshuuin (全集院 タクマ, Zenshuuin Takuma)
Manzou Yumenokata (夢乃館 万蔵, Yumenokata Manzou)
Konishi (小西, Konishi)

== Cast ==
Cast
Character		Japanese	English
Principal cast
Gou Takarada		Kouichi Yamadera	Shane Callahan
Mari Yumenokata		Satomi Koorogi	Pamela Weidner-Houle
Rane Chepanikorus		Miki Takahashi	Juliet Cesario
Leen Kyami Kuunyo		Aya Hisakawa	Izzy Burger-Welsh
Haruki Takarada		Rie Iwatsubo	Tamara Burnham-Mercer
Natsuki Takarada		Rie Iwatsubo	Tamara Burnham-Mercer
Miyuki Takarada		Rie Iwatsubo	Tamara Burnham-Mercer
Takuma Zenshuuin		Ryou Horikawa	Michael Brady
Manzou Yumenokata		Tetsuo Komura	Rob Zapple
Konishi		Kouji Ishii	Chuck Denson, Jr.
Episodic cast
1	Priest		Michael S. Way
1	Art Teacher		Scott Simpson
1	Manager		Ed Wagenseller
1	Staff Lady	Mami Suzuki	Amy Church
1	Agent		Daniel Richani
2	Gou's Mom	Junko Shimakata	Sara Seidman-Vance
2	Cameraman	Akitarou Daichi	Scott Bailey
2	Welcome Women		Natsumi Ueki
2	Welcome Men		Scott Simpson (as Keiichi Morisato)
2	Staff Girl	Kaori Asoh	Billie Toney
2	Red Phoenix	Shocker OH!NO (grunts)	(n/a)

== Episodes ==
#	Title	Director
1	お宝コケたらみなコケた When the Treasure is Screwed Up, Everything is Screwed Up! A Recklessness Treasure Boy	
2	お風呂が空を飛んでいた The Phoenix Takes to the Sky. A Burst Birthday in a Hot Spring	
