= Akemi Okamura =

Japanese voice actress (born 1969)

- 岡村 明美
- Born: March 12, 1969 (age 57); Tokyo, Japan
- Status: Married
- Occupation: Voice actress
- Years active: 1992–present
- Agent: Mausu Promotion
- Notable credits: One Piece as Nami; Clamp School as Nokoru Imonoyama
- Children: 1

Akemi Okamura (岡村 明美, Okamura Akemi; born on March 12, 1969) is a Japanese voice actress. She performed a song in the NHK program Minna no Uta and currently voices Nami in One Piece. She has one child.

== Filmography ==
=== Television animation ===
1992

- Calimero (Priscilla)
- Hime-chan's Ribbon (Yumiko)

1994

- Chō Kuseninarisou (Tamako)
- Lord of Lords Ryu Knight (Princess Lumina)
- Mahoujin Guru Guru (Fairy Churika)

1995

- Juu Senshi Garukiba (Mayu Hiura, Mireia Eternal)
- Zukkoke Sanningumi Kusunoki Yashiki no Guruguru-sama (Yoko Arai)
- Tōma Kishinden ONI (Misao)
- Ninku (Mika)
- Fushigi Yûgi (Yuiren)
- Romeo and the Black Brothers (Bianca)

1996

- Akachan to Boku (Asako Fujii, Female Student, Information Desk Clerk, Mayumi-sensei)
- Kodomo no Omocha (Natsumi Hayama)
- You're Under Arrest (Tetsu)
- Choja Reideen (Kappei Miyamoto)

1997

- Clamp School (Nokoru Imonoyama)
- Battle Athletes Victory (Mylandah Arkar Walder)

1998

- The Adventures of Mini-Goddess (Belldandy, episodes 1–13 only)
- Weiß kreuz (Michiru)
- Vampire Princess Miyu (Yui-Li)
- Urayasu Tekkin Kazoku (Sakura Oosawagi)
- Prince Mackaroo (Kentarou Iwashimizu, Midorioni, Sago Shimizu, Ushimaru)
- Pokémon (Lindow Murasame)
- Master Keaton (Helen)

1999

- Itsumo Kokoro ni Taiyō o! (Mother)
- Now and Then, Here and There (Shuzo "Shu" Matsutani)
- Kindaichi Shounen no Jikenbo (Hazuki Mogami, Leona Kirishima)
- Guru Guru Town Hanamaru-kun (Miinya)
- Steel Angel Kurumi (Kaori)
- GTO: Great Teacher Onizuka (Anko Uehara)
- Zoids (Maria)
- One Piece (Nami)

2000

- Carried by the Wind: Tsukikage Ran (Meow of the Iron Cat Fist)
- Sakura Wars (Kasumi Fujii)
- Daa! Daa! Daa! (Kushaana)
- Hajime no Ippo (Reiko Mikami)

2001

- Motto! Ojamajo Doremi (Junji Manda, Yoko Manda)
- Fruits Basket (Boy, Young Hatsuharu Soma, Mii)
- Magical Meow Meow Taruto (Anzuko Doumyouji / Anko)

2002

- Magical Shopping Arcade Abenobashi (Little Goblin, Sayaka Imamiya)
- Tokyo Mew Mew (Mariko)
- Dragon Drive (Sally)
- Pita Ten (Sasha)

2003

- Ashita no Nadja (Zabine)fu
- Gunparade March (Mai Shibamura)
- Tsuri Baka Nisshi (Dedyu)
- Di Gi Charat Nyo (Francois Usada)
- Pokémon Advance (Michelle)
- Maburaho (Eri)
- Wandaba Style (Furoku Tsukumo, Store Manager, Yokomaki)
- One Piece (Sue)

2004

- Koi Kaze (Kaname Chidori)
- Zatch Bell! (Kido, Mamiko Takashi)
- Yugo the Negotiator (Ruba)
- Legendz: Yomigaeru Ryuuou Densetsu (Shuu)

2005

- Aria the Animation (Agatha)
- Noein - to your other self (Asuka Kaminogi)
- Pokémon Advance (Lilian)
- Monster (Anna, Tomasz)
- One Piece (Gombe)

2006

- The Story of Saiunkoku (Shusui)
- Hell Girl (Minato Fujie)
- Shakugan no Shana (Mathilde Saint-Omer)
- Nana (Nao Komatsu)
- PreCure Splash Star (Foop, Kaoru Kiryuu)
- Mushi-Shi (Kaji)

2007

- Emily of New Moon (Perry Miller)
- Kenko Zenrakei Suieibu Umisho (Kaname's Mother)
- Kotetsushin Jeeg (Captain Midou)
- D.Gray-man (Claudia)
- Devil May Cry (Elise)
- Pokémon: Diamond & Pearl (Saturn)
- Lovely Complex (Risa Koizumi)
- Rental Magica (Minagi Shinogi)

2008

- The Telepathy Girl Ran (Reina Isozaki)
- Natsume's Book of Friends (Hinoe)
- Neuro: Supernatural Detective (Sakura Tsuyuki)

2009

- Tamagotchi! (Mamiko)
- Fullmetal Alchemist: Brotherhood (Paninya)
- Detective Conan (Yasue Taira)
- Yu-Gi-Oh! 5D's (Barbara)
- One Piece (Aphelandra)

2010

- Princess Jellyfish (Mayaya)
- Shoka (Tsukikage)

2011

- X-Men (Hisako's Mother)
- Soreike! Anpanman (Kokurageman)
- Digimon Xros Wars: The Young Hunters Who Leapt Through Time (Tokio Hinoki)
- One Piece (Cocoa)

2012

- Kamisama Kiss (Kamehime)
- Mobile Suit Gundam AGE (Ayla Rose)

2013

- Star Blazers 2199 (Mirenel Linke)

2014

- HappinessCharge PreCure! (Hoshiiwa)
- Pokémon XY (Lindsay)
- Majin Bone (Chie Ryūjin)
- Mekakucity Actors (Shion)
- Detective Conan (Rumi Kitao)

2016

- Erased (Akemi Hinazuki)
- Detective Conan (Midori Koyanagi)

2017

- One Piece (Young Vinsmoke Yonji)
- Sin: The 7 Deadly Sins (Maria Totsuka's mother (ep. 12))

2018

- Märchen Mädchen as Headmaster
- Ninja Girl & Samurai Master 3rd Season as Ei
- Skull-face Bookseller Honda-san as Armor

2019

- The Morose Mononokean II (Aoi)

2021

- The Idaten Deities Know Only Peace (Rin)

2023

- Power of Hope: PreCure Full Bloom (Kaoru Kiryuu)

2026

- Detective Conan (Ran Mori)
- Cyberpunk: Edgerunners 2 (Avida Yang)

=== Original video animation ===
- Agent Aika (1997) (Mina)
- Sakura Taisen series (1997–2002) (Kasumi Fujii)
- Mezzo Forte (2000) (Momomi Momoi)
- Tales of Symphonia (2007–2011) (Sheena Fujibayashi)

=== Film animation ===
- Porco Rosso (1992) (Fio Piccolo)
- Hunter × Hunter (1998) (Mito Freecss)
- One Piece: The Movie (2000) (Nami)
- Sakura Wars: The Movie (2001) (Kasumi Fujii)
- One Piece: Clockwork Island Adventure (2001) (Nami)
- One Piece: Chopper's Kingdom on the Island of Strange Animals (Nami) (2002)
- One Piece The Movie: Dead End Adventure (Nami) (2003)
- One Piece: The Cursed Holy Sword (Nami) (2004)
- Digimon Frontier: Island of the Lost Digimon (Bearmon) (2005)
- One Piece: Baron Omatsuri and the Secret Island (Nami) (2005)
- One Piece: The Giant Mechanical Soldier of Karakuri Castle (Nami) (2006)
- One Piece Movie: The Desert Princess and the Pirates: Adventures in Alabasta (Nami) (2007)
- Episode of Chopper Plus: Bloom in the Winter, Miracle Cherry Blossom (Nami) (2008)
- One Piece Film: Strong World (Nami) (2009)
- One Piece 3D: Straw Hat Chase (Nami) (2011)
- One Piece Film: Z (Nami) (2012)
- One Piece Film: Gold (Nami) (2016)
- Detective Conan: Zero the Enforcer (Announcer) (2018)
- Natsume's Book of Friends The Movie: Ephemeral Bond (Hinoe) (2018)
- One Piece: Stampede (Nami) (2019)
- Natsume's Book of Friends: The Waking Rock and the Strange Visitor (Hinoe) (2021)
- One Piece Film: Red (Nami) (2022)
- A Loud House Christmas Movie: Naughty or Nice (Additional voice) (2025)
- Untitled Detective Conan Movie (Ran) (2027)

=== Video games ===
- Cowboy Bebop: Tsuioku no Serenade (2005) (Bianca)
- Battle Stadium D.O.N (2006) (Ran)
- The 13th Month (2022) (The Queen)
- Another Code: Recollection (2024) (Jessica Robins)

==== Unknown date ====
- Dragon Age II (Aveline)
- Future GPX Cyber Formula series (Lisa Heinel)
- Galaxy Angel (Shiva)
- Galaxy Angel II (Shiva)
- Gunparade March (Mai Shibamura)
- Legendz: Gekitou Saga Battle (Shuzo Matsutani)
- Lego Island (Valerie)
- Night Trap (Megan)
- Fullmetal Alchemist 2: Curse of the Crimson Elixir (Elma)
- One Piece series (Nami)
- Onimusha series (Snow Princess)
- Princess Maker 5 (Cube)
- Sakura Taisen series (Kasumi Fujii)
- Samurai Warriors 2 (Nene)
- Tales of Symphonia series (Sheena Fujibayashi)
- Ys I & II (Reah)
- Fire Emblem Awakening (Emmeryn, Henry)
- Fire Emblem: Three Houses (Cornelia)
- Fire Emblem Warriors: Three Hopes (Cornelia)
- Need For Speed (Amy)

=== CD drama ===
- Happy Time (????) (Mari)
- Tales of Symphonia A Long Time Ago (????) (Sheena Fujibayashi)
- Tales of Symphonia Rodeo Ride Tour (????) (Sheena Fujibayashi)

=== Dubbing roles ===
==== Live-action ====
- Asteroid (Elliot McKee)
- Final Destination (2002 TV Asahi edition) (Terry Chaney)
- Looking for Jackie (Police Officer (Yihong Jiang))
- One Piece (Nami (Emily Rudd))
- Road to Avonlea (Felicity King)
- Tidal Wave (Yoo-jin (Uhm Jung-hwa))
- Ultraman: The Ultimate Hero (Karen Miller)

==== Animation ====
- The Book of Pooh (Kessie)
- Fievel's American Tails (Fievel)
- Hello Kitty's Furry Tale Theater (Hello Kitty)
- X-Men: The Animated Series (Spiral)
- Peppa Pig (Peppa Pig)
- Peppa Pig Tales (Peppa Pig)

== Accolades ==
- Kei Tomiyama and Kazue Takahashi Award at the 18th Seiyu Awards (2024)
