= Kazuya Ichijō =

Japanese voice actor

- 一条 和矢
- Born: Kazunori Fukugasako; Kobe, Japan
- Status: Married
- Occupation: Voice actor
- Years active: 1994-present
- Agent: Ken Production
- Spouse: Minami Hokuto

Kazuya Ichijō (一条 和矢, Ichijō Kazuya) is a Japanese voice actor. He is married to Minami Hokuto, better known by her stage name Hitomi. He also provided the voice of adult video games.

== Notable voice roles ==
=== Anime ===
1994

- Nintama Rantarō (Terai-Mawa, Hachimijiogan, Takuro Seppa)

1995

- Zenki (Inugamiro)
- Juu Senshi Gulkeeva (Greyfus)

1996

- B'tX (Fou Raffine)

1997

- Hikarian - Great Railroad Protector (Seven)
- Kindaichi Shounen no Jikenbo (Takashi Inukai)
- Chō Mashin Eiyūden Wataru (Dream)

1998

- Sexy Commando Gaiden: Sugoi yo!! Masaru-san (Machahiko Kondo)
- Ojarumaru (Aobee, Makoto Tamura, Icchoku Honda, Sam, Cow)
- If I See You in My Dreams (Youhei Kaizuka)

1999

- Crest of the Stars (Kahyul)
- Iketeru Futari (Chief Kuroki)
- To Heart (Hiroyuki Fujita)
- Jubei-Chan The Ninja Girl - Secret of the Lovely Eyepatch (Tenryō Tsumura, Makojiro Hattori)
- Puppet Master Sakon (Tsutomu Saeki)
- Di Gi Charat (Mister Manager)

2000

- Mushrambo (Gitai)
- Brigadoon (Saiban-chou)
- Gear Fighter Dendoh (Gurumet, Keisuke Kusanagi, Meteor)

2001

- Gekito! Crush Gear Turbo (Godboy)
- Banner of the Stars II (Kahyul)

2002

- Digimon Frontier (Baromon)
- Witch Hunter Robin (Kazuya Misawa)
- Ghost in the Shell: Stand Alone Complex (Guru Guru)

2003

- Ashita no Nadja (Dancho)
- Di Gi Charat Nyo! (Michel Usada)

2004

- Yugo the Negotiator (Shekin)
- Burst Angel (Jei)
- Beet the Vandel Buster (Bruzamu)
- Kakyuusei 2 (Sukekiyo Kôdaiji)
- Magical Girl Lyrical Nanoha (Shiro Takamachi)
- ToHeart - Remember my memories (Hiroyuki Fujita)
- Mobile Suit Gundam SEED Destiny (Captain Todaka)

2005

- Magical Girl Lyrical Nanoha A's (Zafira)
- Hell Girl (Koichiro Kisaragi)
- Beet the Vandel Buster Excellion (Hangu)

2006

- Going Wild (Mondo)
- Yamato Nadeshiko Shichi Henge <3 (Captain Wing)
- Kenichi: The Mightiest Disciple (Daimonji, Shinnosuke Tsuji)

2007

- Demashitaa! Powerpuff Girls Z (Aji Monster)
- GeGeGe no Kitarō (Hiruda)
- My Bride Is a Mermaid (Sword Master)
- Magical Girl Lyrical Nanoha StrikerS (Zafira)
- Lovely Complex (Principal)
- Suteki Tantei Labyrinth (Echigo)

2008

- Kimi ga Aruji de Shitsuji ga Ore de (Assassin)
- Bus Gamer (Maezono)
- S.A (President)
- Chaos;Head (Yasuji Ban)

2009

- Fairy Tail (Hot Eye, Wally, Wonderful Gotch)

2010

- Dance in the Vampire Bund (Takashi Saijo)
- The Legend of the Legendary Heroes (Count Klasbel)
- And Yet the Town Moves (Usher)
- Togainu no Chi (Motomi)
- Fortune Arterial: Akai Yakusoku (Masanori Aoto)

2011

- Denpa Onna to Seishun Otoko (Maekawa's father)
- Nura: Rise of the Yokai Clan: Demon Capital (Kyōkotsu)

2012

- Natsume's Book of Friends (Rokka)

2013

- Bakumatsu Gijinden Roman (Oya, Nagai, Kuroda Kanbee)
- DD Hokuto no Ken (Raoh)
- Gifū Dōdō!! Kanetsugu to Keiji (Fake Keiji)
- Outbreak Company (Prime Minister Zahaa)
- One Piece (Breed)
- Re:_Hamatora (Natsukawa)

2015

- Magical Girl Lyrical Nanoha ViVid (Zafira)

2017

- One Piece (Charlotte Moscato)
- Magical Girl Ore (Kokoro-chan)

2024

- The Fable (Master)
- Rinkai! (Headmaster Sawamitsu)
- The Ossan Newbie Adventurer (Snape Resurrect)

2026

- The Cat and the Dragon (King)

=== OVA and Movies ===
1997

- Jungle Emperor Leo (Alan)

2002

- Animation Runner Kuromi (Go, Nonki Hayama, Seiichiro Haryu)

2003

- Triangle Heart: Sweet Songs Forever (Shirō Takamachi)

2004

- Animation Runner Kuromi 2 (Seiichiro Haryu)

2012

- Magical Girl Lyrical Nanoha the Movie 2nd A's (Zafira)

2017

- Magical Girl Lyrical Nanoha Reflection (Zafira)

2018

- Servamp -Alice in the Garden- (Mikado Alicein)

=== Drama CD ===
- Amai Tsumi no Kajitsu (Kazuomi Toudou)
- GENE Tenshi wa Sakareru (Baruto)
- Gouka Kyakusen de Koi wa Hajimaru series 4, 5, 7, 8 (Rin)
- Kizu (Yuusuke Ariga)
- News Center no Koibito (Masahiko Sashou)
- Pearl series 2: Yokubari na Pearl (Reiji)
- Pearl series 3: Wagamama na Pearl (Reiji)
- Pearl series 4: Kimagure na Pearl (Reiji)
- Trinity Blood (Abel Nightlord, Cain Knightlord)
- Ze (Waki Yoshiwara)
- Romeo (Diager)

=== Video games ===
1999

- The King of Fighters '99 (Jhun Hoon)

2000

- The King of Fighters 2000 (Jhun Hoon)

2003

- The King of Fighters 2003 (Jhun Hoon)

2009

- The King of Fighters 2002: Unlimited Match (Jhun Hoon)

2020

- The King of Fighters All Star (Jhun Hoon)

=== Eroge ===
2002

- Floralia (Shigeru Sawatari, Koichi Tamura)
- Enzai (Evan)

2003

- Sore ga Bokura no Renai Seikatsu (Toshihiro Hakushou)
- Take Off! (Shiro Sagami)
- Clover Heart's (Saionji-sensei)

2004

- Yin-Yang! X-Change Alternative (Renji Saotome)
- Fanatica (Curtis Lindstrom, Bertrand)

2005

- Togainu no Chi (Motomi)
- Zettai Fukujuu Meirei (Lawless Streich)

2007

- Gekkou no Carnevale (Guglielmo)
- Touka Gettan (Hiroto Kaga)

2008

- Fortune Arterial (Masanori Aoto)

2010

- Axanael (Jaburu)

2011

- Aiyoku no Eustia (Varrius Meisner)

=== General ===
1995

- 3x3 Eyes: Kyuusei Koushu (Varanasi)

2002

- Natsuiro no Sunadokei (Gahaku Saeki)
- Groove Adventure Rave: Mikan no Hiseki (Lance, Aniki)
- Unlimited Saga (Bel Bend, Clyde)

2005

- Angel's Feather (Shingo Souma)

2008

- Chaos;Head (Yasuji Ban)

2009

- Chaos;Head Noah (Yasuji Ban)
- Touka Gettan: Tsuki no Nai Kao II (Hiroto Kaga)

2010

- Mahou Shoujo Lyrical Nanoha A's Portable: The Battle of Aces (Zafira)

=== Tokusatsu ===
2014

- Ressha Sentai ToQger (Soap Shadow (ep. 21))

2015

- Kamen Rider Drive (Gamma Assault (ep. 48))
- Kamen Rider Ghost (Narration)

2019

- Kishiryu Sentai Ryusoulger (Narration)
