= Now and Then, Here and There =

Japanese anime television series

- Promotional image for Now and Then, Here and There depicting Shu and Lala-Ru

今、そこに いる僕 (Ima, Soko ni Iru Boku)
- Genre: Isekai, post-apocalyptic, science fiction
- Anime television series
- Directed by: Akitaro Daichi
- Produced by: Shōichi Kumabe; Kazuaki Morijiri
- Written by: Hideyuki Kurata
- Music by: Taku Iwasaki
- Studio: AIC
- Licensed by: AUS: Siren Visual; NA: ADV Films (expired) US Manga Corps (former)
- Original network: WOWOW
- English network: CA: Super Channel; NA: Anime Network; SEA: AXN; US: Anime Selects, AZN Television, Syfy
- Original run: October 14, 1999 – January 20, 2000
- Episodes: 13

Now and Then, Here and There (今、そこにいる僕, Ima, Soko ni Iru Boku) is a Japanese anime television series conceived and directed by Akitaro Daichi, with a screenplay by Hideyuki Kurata. It premiered in Japan on the WOWOW television station on October 14, 1999, and ran until January 20, 2000. It was licensed for Region 1 DVD English language release by Central Park Media under their US Manga Corps label. Following the 2009 bankruptcy and liquidation of Central Park Media, ADV Films rescued the series for a boxset re-release on July 7, 2009. However, the ADV re-release is now out of print. The series is available for purchase through iTunes, YouTube and Google Play.

Now and Then, Here and There follows a young boy named Shuzo "Shu" Matsutani who, in an attempt to save an unknown girl, is transported to another world which may be the Earth in the far future. The world is desolate and militarized, survival is a daily struggle for displaced refugees, and water is a scarce commodity.

== Plot ==
While walking home from school, the main protagonist, Shu—a boy who loves kendo—intercedes to protect a girl, Lala-Ru, who is attacked by abductors piloting dragon-like mechas and is accidentally transported to the attackers' world as a result—a wasteland devoid of water and dominated by a red giant star. Lala-Ru possesses a pendant containing a vast reservoir of water, and she has the ability to control it.

Shu is trapped in this new, harsh reality, and he is beaten and interrogated repeatedly inside the warship commanded by the ruthless, manic dictator, Hamdo. While locked in a cell he meets an abducted girl who introduces herself as Sara Ringwalt of the United States. Sara's reason for her capture was being mistaken for Lala-Ru by Hamdo's minions. Sara is forced into the quarters of exceptional soldiers to be impregnated and is traumatized by her repeated rape. After an assault by an unknown enemy landship, Shu is forced to join an army of child soldiers; children trained for the looting of villages, in which they kidnap female villagers for breeding, and conscript orphaned male children into the ever dwindling ranks of Hamdo's army.

It is a haunting story of a dystopian world, and of Shu, who has to endure torture, hunger, and the horrors of war in order to save the lonely girl he found sitting atop a smokestack. Much of the series deals with serious moral issues relating to war and famine, the consequences of war, slavery, rape, and the exploitation of children.

== Characters ==
- Shuzo "Shu" Matsutani (松谷 修造, Matsutani Shūzō; シュウ Shū) is a student of kendo and carries a shinai, though he fights primarily with a wooden stick, which also is a motif for his non-lethal combat style. After being thrust into a new world and brutally interrogated, he is forced to join the child army of Hellywood. Shu's character is strong-willed, uncompromising, obstinate, and believes that good can come from all situations. His devotion to protect Lala-Ru is one of the main aspects of the story. His experiences and interactions with Lala-Ru, Hamdo, and Nabuca open his eyes to the new world. Despite overwhelming odds, he retains his principles of not killing and of believing that good will still come while one is alive. After saving the world by convincing Lala-Ru that people are good, Shu is sent back home by a reformed Abelia. In the anime television series, Shu is voiced by Akemi Okamura in Japanese and Ted Lewis in English.
- Lala-Ru (ララ・ルゥ, Rara Rū) possesses the power to manipulate water using a pendant containing a now nearly-depleted water reservoir, which is directly tied to her physical strength and health. She is quiet and non-violent (often failing to resist violence against her) and appears to be a child, although her age is unknown (she claims to be thousands of years old). Due to her long and disillusioned experience with humans, she feels little to no emotions with them. Her relationship with Shu changes her to be more protective and open with Shu and Sis; Shu for risking his life despite being in a foreign land as well as knowing nothing about her, and Sis for treating her like a daughter despite not knowing her very long. After using her power to flood Hellywood and parts of the world with water she soon vanished from existence right next to Shu after seeing the sunset for the last time. In the anime television series, Lala-Ru is voiced by Kaori Nazuka in Japanese and Lisa Ortiz in English.
- Hamdo (ハムド, Hamudo), the military leader of a kingdom called Hellywood, he is a shrewd but has the mentality of a spoiled ten-year-old child, paranoid megalomaniac. He feels a sense of entitlement to water, an essential resource in his plans to rule the Earth, that leads to an obsession with the mysterious Lala-Ru and the suppression of any who stand in his way. Water is also required to launch his flying fortress, which is powered by water. In a quest to secure water and other resources needed for his ultimate goal, Hamdo's army abducts children and other villagers to use as human capital in his endeavor. Hamdo suffers from uncontrollable bursts of rage. In a gruesome display of his blind emotion, he kills a cat, only to throw it on the ground and step on it later while interrogating Shu. Later in the series, Hamdo's lust for water and power begets paranoia and he begins to doubt the loyalty of his adviser. He died at the end of the series when he drowned in the transport chamber (all the while suffering a complete mental breakdown, screaming and shrieking like a frightened child), his lifeless corpse dragged away by the current. Hamdo is voiced by Kouji Ishii in Japanese and Jack Taylor in English.
- Abelia (アベリア, Aberia) is the devoted commanding officer of Hamdo's army. She is a capable military strategist, though Hamdo does not always heed her advice. Abelia thanklessly yields to the whim of her senior. By the series' end, she'd given up on supporting Hamdo's ambitions and leaves him to die amidst the chaos of his eroding empire. She then joins the free world to establish a peaceful future alongside them. Abelia is voiced by Reiko Yasuhara in Japanese and Dana Halsted in English.
- Nabuca (ナブカ, Nabuka) is the leader of the child army unit Shu is forced to join. He resents Shu and sees him as a troublemaker. He feels ashamed for Shu having saved his life during a fight. Nabuca, just a child himself, devotes himself entirely to the army in the hopes that he will someday be allowed to return to his home. He repeatedly tells himself that what he does is the only thing that will enable him to return home, and this thought is the only thing keeping him going. Once Boo dies trying to protect him, he eventually comes to realize all too late the nature of his actions and has a sudden change of heart. In the last episode, he is betrayed and mortally wounded by Tabool, one of the boys in his unit and the only other survivor from their village. After painfully making his way to the jail cell where Shu is being kept with other prisoners from Zari-Bars, he tells Shu to go back to where he came from and that it is where he belongs. He dies immediately after in the arms of Shu who holds him through the prison cell bars. Nabuca is voiced by Yuka Imai in Japanese and Dan Green in English.
- Boo (ブゥ, Bū) is the youngest soldier in Nabuca's unit and his closest companion. He is naïve, and like Nabuca, believes he will be sent home after the war until then end where he loses hope of regaining a sense of normalcy and cannot go on. Boo dies during the invasion of Zari-Bars in episode 12 where he takes a bullet for Nabuca. Boo is voiced by Hiroko Konishi in Japanese and Rachael Lillis in English.
- Sara Ringwalt (サラ・リングワルト, Sara Ringuwaruto) is an American girl who is mistaken for Lala-Ru and is kidnapped on her way to pick up her father from work. She is taken to Hellywood where she is regularly raped by the Hellywood soldiers, one of whom she kills in self-defense. After escaping from Hellywood, she is rescued from the desert sands by Sis who brings her to Zari-Bars. Sara resents Lala-Ru and blames her solely for the predicament she is in. Unable to cope with the pain of being raped and carrying a child as a result of her ordeal, she attempts to commit suicide and abort the baby by pounding a rock into her abdomen. Shu, however, intervenes, taking the blows of the rock on his hand which he uses to cover her abdomen. Sis' dying request that she not hate the faultless baby changes Sara's mind and she decides to stay in the desert world with her baby, Sis' orphans, and ex-Hellywood child soldiers to start a new life. Sara is voiced by Azusa Nakao in Japanese and Kayzie Rogers in English.
- Tabool (タブール, Tabūru) is a boy soldier in Nabuca's unit who came from the same village as Nabuca. He appears captivated with the actions of Hamdo and his war and is uninterested in returning home. He is attracted to the strength of the military, and bullies others in the unit. In the final episode, he shoots and mortally wounds Nabuca, and not long after, he dies while trying to survive Hellywood's destruction by Lala-Ru's flood, being drowned in the water and his lifeless body sucked away by the current. Tabool is voiced by Akio Suyama in Japanese and Crispin Freeman in English.
- Sis (シス, Shisu) is a tough and respected member of the city-state Zari-Bars. She acts as a caretaker and stand-in mother for the children who were orphaned as result of the war state. She advocates non-violence. When Sis tries to stop Elamba from taking Lala-Ru hostage, she is shot in the leg and dies in the final episode from the bleeding. Sis is voiced by Rica Matsumoto in Japanese and Rachael Lillis in English.
- Elamba (エランバ, Eranba) is the leader of the radical faction at Zari-Bars. His entire family was murdered by Hellywood's soldiers. Periodically, he sends assassins into Hellywood to try to kill King Hamdo. Ironically, Elamba's ruthless methods resemble those of the man he hates. He seizes Lala-Ru and tries unsuccessfully to use her to negotiate with Hellywood. This ends with him being sprayed by bullets and falling to his death. Elamba is voiced by Hisoka Yamamoto in Japanese and Scott Rayow in English.
- Soon is a quiet young girl living with Sis and the orphans in Zari-Bars. She spends many days separated from the other children her age in hopes that her father may one day return. Little does she know that her father was one of Elamba's assassins that died at the hands of Nabuca and the other Hellywood soldiers. In the meanwhile, she begins to open up to both Shu and Lala-Ru, requesting that they stay even when the radicals of the village turn against them. When she overhears Nabuca admit to killing the assassins, Soon attempts to kill Nabuca with a rifle but fails to do so due to Boo's self-sacrifice. Nabuca, horrified and almost reflexively shoots her to death in return. Soon is voiced by Ayaka Saito in Japanese and Kerry Williams in English.

== Media ==
=== Anime episode list ===
No.	Title	Original release date
1	"A Girl Admiring the Sunset" "Tasogare wo mitsu meru shōjo" (黄昏を見つめる少女)	October 14, 1999
Shuzo "Shu" Matsutani loses a kendo match at his dojo, where his opponent criticizes him for his lack of defense. Walking across town later in the day, Shu sees a girl named Lala-Ru sitting on a smokestack and watching the sunset. After a short amount of time talking to her, time suddenly freezes as a green beam of light covers the surrounding area. Lala-Ru ends up being captured by officers controlling snakelike machines and transported back into a stationary battleship named Hellywood. Shu is accidentally brought with them. After being chased by more soldiers in the water tower, Shu and Lala-Ru are separated at an operating bridge. Shu grabs Lala-Ru's pendant before he plummets into a tunnel to the outside, one of a barren wasteland.
2	"A Boy and a Mad King" "Shōnen to kyō ō to" (少年と狂王と)	October 21, 1999
Lala-Ru is taken to see Abelia, who sees the pendant missing but then realizes Shu might have it. Nabuca finds Shu at a lower-level bridge over a large furnace. The pendant unknowingly drops off the bridge while they fight. Shu suddenly stops when he holds Nabuca's knife instead of his wooden stick, and Shu also saves Nabuca from falling when a railing nearly collapses. Afterwards, Shu is arrested and sent to see an aggravated Hamdo, concerned of the pendant's whereabouts. It is explained that Lala-Ru has the power to manipulate the source of water within the pendant, which will help reconstruct the battleship. Hamdo orders Abelia to do whatever necessary to torture Shu and find the pendant.
3	"A Feast in the Dark" "Yami no naka no utage" (闇の中の宴)	October 28, 1999
Shu wakes up and finds a traumatized girl, first thinking her to be Lala-Ru. Meanwhile, Abelia brings Lala-Ru to see Hamdo, though Lala-Ru refuses to talk, much to Hamdo's chagrin. It turns out that the girl is from America and is named Sara Ringwalt, who was abducted by mistake. Abelia orders Shu to be hanged after another failed interrogation. As an enemy battleship approaches Hellywood, a missile is launched from the rig and successfully makes impact, thereby making a statement for any future attacks. Abelia is given the order from Hamdo that all male soldiers will scout the whole tower to find the missing pendant.
4	"Discord" "Fukyōwaon" (不協和音)	November 4, 1999
Nabuca requests Boo to keep an eye on Shu, who will be forcefully enlisted with the crew as soon as he recovers. A frustrated Abelia suspends the pendant search for the remainder of the day, since it was found neither in the engine room nor the prison cells. It is revealed that all the soldiers were kidnapped from their hometowns and sent to Hellywood for unknown reasons. The only way to be released is when the war has ended. Tabool, growing impatient, beats Shu up for not saying where the pendant is located. However, Tabool is caught by Nabuca and is to be given lashes as punishment. Shu refuses an order to give the lashings. Nabuca later advises Shu not to run away, lest he be killed by his fellow crew members.
5	"Murder" "Hitogoroshi" (ひとごろし)	November 11, 1999
Shu and Nabuca enter into a mock battle, wooden stick versus sharp knife. However, the match ends due to Shu's reckless style of combat. Two unknown assailants later invade the battleship and try to assassinate Hamdo. Though Hamdo is able to shoot down one of the assailants, the other one escapes and uses Boo as a hostage to prevent Nabuca from shooting. Shu attacks the other assailant, allowing Boo to break free by stabbing his captor's hand. Nabuca shoots the man in the chest. Shu tries to save the stranger, but Nabuca kills the assailant by shooting him in the head. All troops are ordered to travel through a sandstorm in order to recruit more women and children from a nearby village.
6	"Disappearance in a Sandstorm" "Sunaarashi ga kieru" (砂嵐が消える)	November 18, 1999
Inside a room, Sara beat a man to death after being violated by him. She flees from Hellywood at night, cuts her hair off and runs deep into the desert. Tabool believes that Shu does not deserve to drink water because of his nonviolent views, while Nabuca tells him that there is no way around this. The Hellywood army begins to attack the village, recruiting women and children by force. However, Shu attempts to release all captives, going against the order. Nabuca shoots Shu in the leg to subdue him from interfering. On the way back to the fortress, Nabuca feels guilty and empathetic for taking part in seizing these innocent victims.
7	"Night of Flight" "Nogare no oru" (逃れの夜)	November 25, 1999
Shu not only is told by Tabool that he may be sentenced to death, but he is also informed of what has happened to Sara. Remembering his resolve to save Lala-Ru, Shu finds the pendant in an underground cell. He breaks out of prison with Boo's help and manages to slip pass the other male soldiers. He finds Lala-Ru with Hamdo in a greenhouse, shattering through the glass to give her back the pendant, but Abelia shows up and shoots Shu in the arm. Lala-Ru then activates her powers through the pendant and fills the entire fortress with water to make her escape with Shu. The two try to hide in a cavern, but Nabuca ends up chancing upon Shu. After Shu tries to convince Nabuca to join him to avoid anymore bloodshed, Nabuca declines the offer but allows him to escape, returning the favor of once being saved by him.
8	"Two Lone Souls" "Hitoribotchi no futari" (ひとりぼっちのふたり)	December 2, 1999
An unknown person finds Sara buried in the desert, taking her back to a village. It is theorized that Hellywood could be mobilized by using the available water as fuel. Nabuca and Boo have to keep their mouths shut on the whereabouts of Shu and Lala-Ru. Shu rides on a motorcycle with Lala-Ru in tow, but it lands in quicksand, and Shu fends off a carnivorous plant that had latched onto Lala-Ru with its red vines. It is revealed that Lala-Ru becomes weaker each time she uses her pendant as well as that her powers are taken for granted especially if needed on demand. Shu destroys the carnivorous plant using grenades found in a backpack left behind by a nearby corpse. As the two continue their journey, he says to her that not all people in the world are bad.
9	"In the Chasm" "Hazama nite" (狭間にて)	December 9, 1999
Shu and Lala-Ru arrive in a village called Zari-Bars, where they meet Sis, who runs an orphanage. Shu has to keep Lala-Ru's identity a secret from Sis to avoid any trouble that could arise. Sis allows the two to stay with her in exchange for working in the fields with the other children. Later at night, Soon says that she misses her father, but she is unaware that he was one of the assailants who was killed in Hellywood. Also, Elamba tells Shu that his entire family was killed by the Hellywood army, which is why he wants Hamdo to be assassinated. Shu is perplexed after hearing all this, and he starts to cry when Lala-Ru comes to see him.
10	"Prelude to Chaos" "Konton e no josō" (混沌への助走)	December 16, 1999
Shu and Soon walk to a head spring in order to retrieve water for Sis. Elamba, already over there, continues to persist on persuading Shu to help his faction in an attempt to kill Hamdo. An injured soldier named Kazam, claiming to have deserted Hellywood, is taken into the village to be treated for his wound. However, this is just a ruse for Hamdo to find the location of Zari-Bars without any sign of suspicion. Hellywood prepares to launch using water as its source of energy. The nozzles first fail to respond, but Abelia manages to fix the problem in order to prevent the battleship from toppling over. At night, Sara, revealed to be staying at the village, goes into a fit of rage when she sees Lala-Ru right in front of her.
11	"Eve of Destruction" "Hōkai zenya" (崩壊前夜)	January 6, 2000
Even though Sis figures out Lala-Ru's true identity, she still allows Shu and Lala-Ru to stay at the orphanage. Not only does Sara faint from trauma and stress, but she also learns that she is pregnant. One of the faction members tells Elamba that there is a secret weapon within Zari-Bars capable of destroying Hellywood. It is revealed that Lala-Ru has lived for thousands of years. Despite this, Sis insists that Lala-Ru appears as a lost and lonely child. Sara sneaks out at night to the head spring and drown herself, but Shu painfully manages to stop her from doing so. The next morning Shu and Lala-Ru prepare to leave Zari-Bars. Elamba stops them, planning to use Lala-Ru as collateral to negotiate with Hellywood. Kazam fails to convince Sara to leave the village with him before it becomes invaded by Hellywood.
12	"This Bloody Earth" "Satsuriku no daichi" (殺戮の大地)	January 13, 2000
Soon takes Shu and Lala-Ru to a watering cavern to hide from the danger that precedes them. Elamba tells his faction of Lala-Ru's true identity, hanging Sis to a post as punishment. After the faction points a gun at Lala-Ru and threatens to come with him and see Elamba, Lala-Ru uses her water powers to drown him and bring everyone outside. When Elamba prepares to take Lala-Ru with him, Hamdo descends Hellywood onto Zari-Bars, causing destruction upon the village. Sis is on the verge of dying while Sara watches over her. As Shu and Soon run to a shelter in order to save the children, Nabuca and Boo soon find them there. Nabuca tells Shu that he must kill to save himself. Overhearing Nabuca being the one who killed her father, Soon attempts to take revenge. As she fires a bullet, Boo blocks Nabuca and takes the hit, which then Nabuca kills Soon in retaliation.
13	"Now and Then, Here and There" "Ima, soko ni iru boku" (今、そこにいる僕)	January 20, 2000
Zari-Bars is under Hellywood's control and confinement. Lala-Ru disregards Hamdo for his request to use her pendant in order to help refuel the battleship. At an operating bridge, Nabuca is distraught upon learning from Tabool that Hamdo lied about releasing him after this war was over. Nabuca is then shot in the chest by Tabool, falling over the ledge. Before breathing her last breath, Sis tells Sara to not reject her child as a mother when it is born. At the underground prison, Nabuca gives Shu his wooden stick before passing away, allowing Shu to escape and free all the children. When Shu jumps down to rescue Lala-Ru, she uses her water powers to overflow the core of the battleship. During this time, Sara saves all the children, with the help of Kazam at the cost of his life. Hamdo drowns within the tower when Abelia chooses to ignore helping him. When the downpour clears, Shu and Lala-Ru sit at the shore. As they watch the sunset together one last time, she slowly vanishes in his arms. Sara decides to stay with the children, and Abelia sends Shu back to his world. A sunset hovers over the horizon behind the smokestacks.

=== Soundtrack ===
Released 1999, the Now and Then, Here and There contains seventeen tracks, including the opening and ending sequences. Most of the tracks are performed by Taku Iwasaki (credited as Takumi Iwasaki) with one track performed by Toshio Masuda and one performed by Masuda and Reiko Yasuhara.

#	Title	Length
1.	Standing in the Sunset Glow	20:16
2.	Decadence	2:35
3.	Run Up	2:34
4.	Rescuer	2:48
5.	The Bottom	2:30
6.	Tears	3:06
7.	Tumbling	3:09
8.	Calmative	4:24
9.	Deadlock	2:21
10.	A Raw Deal	2:25
11.	Pazzia	2:34
12.	Miss...	2:47
13.	One Calm	2:42
14.	Fearful Dream	3:30
15.	Here and There	2:38
16.	今,そこにいる僕 (Ima soko ni iru boku)	3:22
17.	子守歌... (In the End...)	2:16

== Reception ==
The show was very well received by critics and also received comparisons to Grave of the Fireflies. AnimeOnDVD.com stated Now and Then, Here and There is "a wonderfully scripted show, where each line of dialog seems to be said with some larger purpose behind it." Of the events of war, the show continues a "devastating and brutal feel throughout.". Commenting on the realism of the show, reviewer Chris Beveridge stated "The story doesn't flinch from putting people into the situations and resolving them in a way that they'd likely play out in real life." SciFi.com stated the show was "a cruel series with a kindhearted message" that contrasted brutality with a greater message. The review further mentioned:

Never before in anime have I seen a dead cat used as a motif and a metaphor. But like so many aspects of Now and Then, Here and There, this unusual artistic decision is a startling, effective and chilling one.

J!-ENT.com's Dennis A. Amith stated that the series "shows a perspective of war through the eyes of a young teen. The savagery, the brutality, and how even through darkness, hope can go a long way. A riveting anime series that is worth watching and even worth owning!" Anime News Network reviewer Theron Martin called the series "one of the best-written and most emotionally powerful anime series ever made."

== See also ==
- Military use of children
- Dying Earth genre
