= Animation Runner Kuromi =

Japanese original video animation

- Animation Runner Kuromi DVD cover

アニメ制作進行くろみちゃん (Anime Seisaku Shinkō Kuromi-chan)
- Genre: Comedy
- Original video animation
- Directed by: Akitaro Daichi
- Music by: Toshio Masuda
- Studio: Yumeta Company
- Licensed by: NA: U.S. Manga Corps
- Released: 2001
- Original video animation

Animation Runner Kuromi 2
- Directed by: Akitaro Daichi
- Written by: Aki Itami
- Music by: Toshio Masuda
- Studio: Yumeta Company
- Licensed by: NA: U.S. Manga Corps
- Released: 2004

Animation Runner Kuromi (アニメーション制作進行くろみちゃん, Animeshon Seisaku Shinkō Kuromi-chan) is an OVA anime film produced by Yumeta Company; part 1 in 2001 and part 2 in 2004. It is a parody of the anime production business itself. It was released on DVD in North America by Central Park Media.

== Plot ==
=== Animation Runner Kuromi 1 ===
The plot revolves around a girl called Mikiko "Kuromi" Oguro who grows up watching the fictional anime Luis Monde III. She decides that animation is something she wants to do, and so enrolls in animation school. When she gets out of school, she is delighted to find a job at a small animation studio named Studio Petit. The director of the studio shows her around and gives her the nickname "Kuromi," a name meant to abbreviate her own.

Very soon after Mikiko arrives the director falls seriously ill and leaves his post, but not before he appoints Mikiko with the job of Production Desk Manager, on the second episode of the studio's current anime, Time Journeys.

The audience follows Mikiko's frantic attempts and schemes to convince the studio's artists to work harder and produce their key frames in time to send them for production.

=== Animation Runner Kuromi 2 ===
Mikiko "Kuromi" Oguro is still working as Production Desk Manager at Studio Petit, and thanks to the excellent job she did, she is now in charge of 3 anime series. Luckily for Mikiko this time around she has some help from a veteran producer in the form of Takashimadaira. Unfortunately Takashimadaira is concerned only with getting the product out on time, even if it means cutting on the quality of the product. This leaves Mikiko with a difficult decision on which is the more important, the quality of the product or the deadline.

== Cast ==
=== Animation Runner Kuromi 1 ===
Animation Runner Kuromi 1
Role	Japanese	English
Mikiko "Kuromi" Aguro	Kaori Asou	Lisa Ortiz
Hamako Shihonmatsu	Reiko Yasuhara	Suzanne Savoy (as Suzy Prue)
Hassaku Hozumi	Yoshirou Matsumoto	Vinnie Penna
Mizuho Tanonaka	Eiji Itou	Eric Stuart
Seiichirou Haryuu	Kazuya Ichijou	Jay Snyder
Aoi Fukami	Akemi Okamura	Debora Rabbai
Mai Horiguchi	Mayumi Misawa	Rachael Lillis
Masato Oppama	Masahito Yabe	Scott Cargle
President	Koji Ishii	Alvaro J. Gonzalez
Battobi	Mieko Ichikawa	Debora Rabbai (as Angora Deb)
Nonki Hayama	Kazuya Ichijo	Sam Riegel (as Jack Lingo)
Surfer	Kouji Ishii	Eric Schussler
Ken	Akemi Okamura	Sam Riegel
Yuri	Rika Komatsu	Carolee Goodgold

=== Animation Runner Kuromi 2 ===
Animation Runner Kuromi 2
Role	Japanese	English
Mikiko "Kuromi" Aguro	Kaori Asou	Lisa Ortiz
Hamako Shihonmatsu	Reiko Yasuhara	Carol Jacobanis
Rei Takashimaidara	Kouji Ishii	Jay Snyder
Hassaku Hozumi	Yoshirou Matsumoto	Vinnie Penna
Mizuho Tanonaka	Eiji Itou	Eric Stuart
Seiichirou Haryuu	Kazuya Ichijou	Jay Snyder
Aoi Fukami	Akemi Okamura	Debora Rabbai (as Angora Deb)
Mai Horiguchi	Mayumi Misawa	Rachael Lillis
Nonki Hayama	Chou	Tom Wayland
Yuu Tokahara	Masuo Amada	Mike Pollock
Shin Kumegawa	Masashi Yabe	Eric Stuart
Battobi	Mieko Ichikawa	Debora Rabbai (as Angora Deb)
President	Kouji Ishii	Mike Pollock

== Commentary ==
After the anime, the original film included a very short live-action documentary in which several anime artists give their opinion of the film's representation of the anime business, and the making of "Animation Runner Kuromi" itself is discussed.

Many of the problems Kuromi faces are the same as those faced by software project managers. The second episode is a classic example of what Ed Yourdon calls a "Death March" in his book of the same name, and many of the solutions Kuromi comes up with, particularly the use of triage, are the same as those found in the book.

== See also ==
- Shirobako
- Girlish Number
