= Lisa Ortiz =

American voice actress

- Ortiz in 2026
- Occupations: Voice actress; voice director
- Years active: 1996–present
- Website: lisaortiz.com

Lisa Ortiz is an American voice actress and voice director. She is best known for her roles in English anime adaptations, such as Lina Inverse in Slayers and Amy Rose in Sonic X. She voiced the latter character in the mainline and spin-off Sonic the Hedgehog video games from 2005 to 2010.

Ortiz has served as voice director for the English dub of Pokémon since 2016, in addition to having performed several voice roles during the anime's first season. In 2021, she reprised Tao Jun in the Netflix anime Shaman King.

== Career ==
Lisa has appeared in titles for SDI Media, NYAV Post, 4Kids Entertainment, Central Park Media, Headline Studios, TAJ Productions, and DuArt Film and Video. Her first major voice acting role was the Gym Leader Sabrina in the long running Pokémon anime series.

At the 2002 Katsucon in Baltimore, Maryland, Lisa admitted that her start in voice overs came from her brother stealing her car, which led to her meeting a friend to retrieve the car, who then invited her to a casting call for Record of Lodoss War.

Ortiz is the President of Noise of O Productions, LLC, an audio post house and has directed for games and animation, including Modern Combat 5 and Super 4.

== Personal life ==
Ortiz resides in Los Angeles, California, and frequently travels to New York City for business. In terms of political views, she is an open critic of Immigration and Customs Enforcement.

== Filmography ==
=== Anime dubbing ===
Year	Title	Role	Notes	Ref.
1986	Gall Force: Eternal Story	Eluza, Pony		
1990–1991	Record of Lodoss War	Deedlit		
1991–1992	Gall Force: New Era	Garnet		
1994–1996	The Irresponsible Captain Tylor	Azalyn, Emi, Yumi Hanner		
1995	Battle Skipper	Saori Tachibana		
1995–2009	The Slayers	Lina Inverse		
1996	Twin Signal	Kris Sign		
1996	Battle Arena Toshinden	Ellis		
1997	Rayearth OVA	Fuu Hououji		
1997	Revolutionary Girl Utena	Shiori Takatsuki		
1998	Geobreeders	Sanae		
1998	Virgin Fleet	Hatsuki Fujiwara, Mari Sakisaka		
^{1998–2024}	Pokémon	Various including: Daisy, Sabrina, Flannery, Korrina, Oakley, Oshawott.		
1998–1999	Record of Lodoss War: Chronicles of the Heroic Knight	Deedlit		
1998–1999	His and Her Circumstances	Tsubasa Shibahime		
1999	Legend of Himiko	Koran		
1999	Magic User's Club	Nanaka Nakatomi		
1999	Space Pirate Mito	Mito, Ranban in Exo-suit		
1999	To Heart	Tomoko Hoshina		
1999–2000	Now and Then, Here and There	LaLa Ru		
1999–2003	One Piece	Tony Tony Chopper	4Kids dub	
1999–2004	Magical DoReMi	Patina, Penny Shimakura		
2000	Blue Gender	Alicia Whistle		
2000	Boogiepop Never Laughs: Boogiepop Phantom	Saki Yoshisawa		
2000	Descendants of Darkness	Maria Wong		
2000–2001	Yu-Gi-Oh! Duel Monsters	Serenity Wheeler		
2001	Animation Runner Kuromi	Mikiko "Kuromi" Oguro		
2001	Comic Party	Chisa Tsukamoto, Minami Makimura		
2001	Fighting Foodons	Coco		
2001	Tama and Friends	Chopin		
2002	Arcade Gamer Fubuki	Chizuru		
2002	Samurai Deeper Kyo	Mika		
2002	Shaman King (2001 TV series)	Jun Tao, Soumei Tao		
2002–2003	Ultimate Muscle: The Kinnikuman Legacy	Roxanne		
2003	Shadow Star Narutaru	Jun Ezumi		
2003	The World of Narue	Kiriri Kaibashira, Kyouko Kudo, Manaka Oatari/Magical Girl #4		
2003–2006	Sonic X	Amy Rose		
2004–2006	Yu-Gi-Oh! GX	Mindy, Linda, Yasmin, Maiden in Love, Elemental HERO Burstinatrix		
2005	Kujibiki Unbalance	Kaoruko Yamada		
2005–2006	Aria	Ai Aino		
2007–2010	Ikki Tousen	Kaku Bunwa		
2009	Yu-Gi-Oh! 5D's	Patty, Claire, Barbara		
2009–2012	Queen's Blade	Melona, Echidna	For the role of Melona: As Darla Chaney Seasons 1–2 and the OVA; As Trina Hilbe Season 3	
2012	Yu-Gi-Oh! ZEXAL II	Lotus Hanazoe		
2012	Zetman	Tomomi, Swim Teacher	Episode 5	
2017	Mobile Suit Gundam SEED	Natarle Badgiruel	NYAV Post dub	
2018	Muhyo & Roji's Bureau of Supernatural Investigation	Imai		
2020	Arte	Daphne		
2021	Battle Game in 5 Seconds	Mion		
2021	Full Dive: This Ultimate Next-Gen Full Dive RPG Is Even Shittier Than Real Life!	Queen Govern		
2021	JoJo's Bizarre Adventure: Stone Ocean	Prisoner		
2021	Numberblocks	Ten	US Version	
2021	Shaman King	Jun Tao, Soumei Tao		
2021	That Time I Got Reincarnated as a Slime	Frey		
2021–2024	My Hero Academia	Burnin		
2022	That Time I Got Reincarnated as a Slime the Movie: Scarlet Bond	Frey		

=== Animation ===
Year	Title	Role	Notes	Ref.
2001	Cubix: Robots for Everyone	Babysix	English dub	
2003	Teenage Mutant Ninja Turtles	Jhanna		
2003–2004	Funky Cops	Miss Lee	4Kids dub	
2004–2007, 2019	Winx Club	Musa, Icy, Digit, Mitzi, Griselda	4Kids and 3Beep dubs; Seasons 1–3, 8	
2005–2006	G.I. Joe: Sigma 6	Jinx		
2006	Padre Pio	Additional voices		
2006–2009	Viva Piñata	Mrs. Whirlm, Betty Bunnycomb		
2006–2010	Chaotic	Lulu, Unda, Servant of Water		
2007	The Little Cars 2: Rodopolis Adventures	Cris Crash		
2007	Ratatoing	Carol		
2008	The Little Cars 3: Fast and Furious	Cris Crash		
2008–2011	Angel's Friends	Miki, Cabiria		
2009	Little & Big Monsters	Amanda		
2018–2021	44 Cats	Jumpy, Gaby, Astricat, Sandy, Ginny, others		

=== Films ===
Year	Title	Role	Notes	Ref.
1998	Galaxy Express 999: The Eternal Fantasy	Maetel	English dub	
1999	Adolescence of Utena	Shiori Takatsuki, Shadow Girl E-ko	English dub	
1999	Pokémon: The First Movie	Miranda	English dub	
2001	Pokémon: Spell of the Unown	Lisa	English dub	
2003	Pokémon Heroes	Oakley	English dub	
2005	Pokémon: Destiny Deoxys	Rebecca	English dub	
2006	Impy's Island	Ping		
2007	Exte: Hair Extensions	Yuko Mizushima	English dub	
2008	Impy's Wonderland	Ping		
2010	Time of Eve	Rina	English dub	
2011	Kikoriki. Team Invincible	Rosa	English dub	
2019	The Fairy Princess & the Unicorn	Ophira		
2022	One Piece Film: Red	Sunny-kun	English dub	

=== Video games ===
Year	Title	Role	Notes	Ref.
2002	Grand Theft Auto: Vice City	Pedestrian, Commercial Announcer		
2004	Shaman King: Power of Spirit	Tao Jun	English dub	
2005–2010	Sonic the Hedgehog	Amy Rose		
2006	Winx Club: Video Game (PC/PS2)	Icy, Musa		
2014	Smite	Izanami, Divine Dragon Bellona (voice)		
2011	PokéPark 2: Wonders Beyond	Oshawott	English dub	
2016	Street Fighter V	Noembelu	English dub	
2017	Fire Emblem Heroes	Eremiya	English dub	
2022	Fire Emblem Warriors: Three Hopes	Additional voices	English dub	
2022	Path to Nowhere	Bai Yi, Joan	English dub	
2022	Goddess of Victory: Nikke	Ether, Dolla	English dub	

=== Web ===
Year	Title	Role	Notes
2024	One Real Sonic	Amy Rose, Alternate Amy	YouTube fan-made animation

=== Live action ===
- Adventures in Voice Acting – Herself

== Production credits ==
=== Voice director ===
- Asphalt Overdrive
- Brothers in Arms 3: Sons of War
- Dragon Mania Legends
- Dungeon Hunter 5
- Modern Combat 5: Blackout
- Norm of the North
- Pokémon (Season 19+/Movie 18+)
- Psychic School Wars

Preceded by Jennifer Douillard	English Voice of Amy Rose (video games); 2005–2010	Succeeded by Cindy Robinson
