= Wayne Grayson =

American voice actor

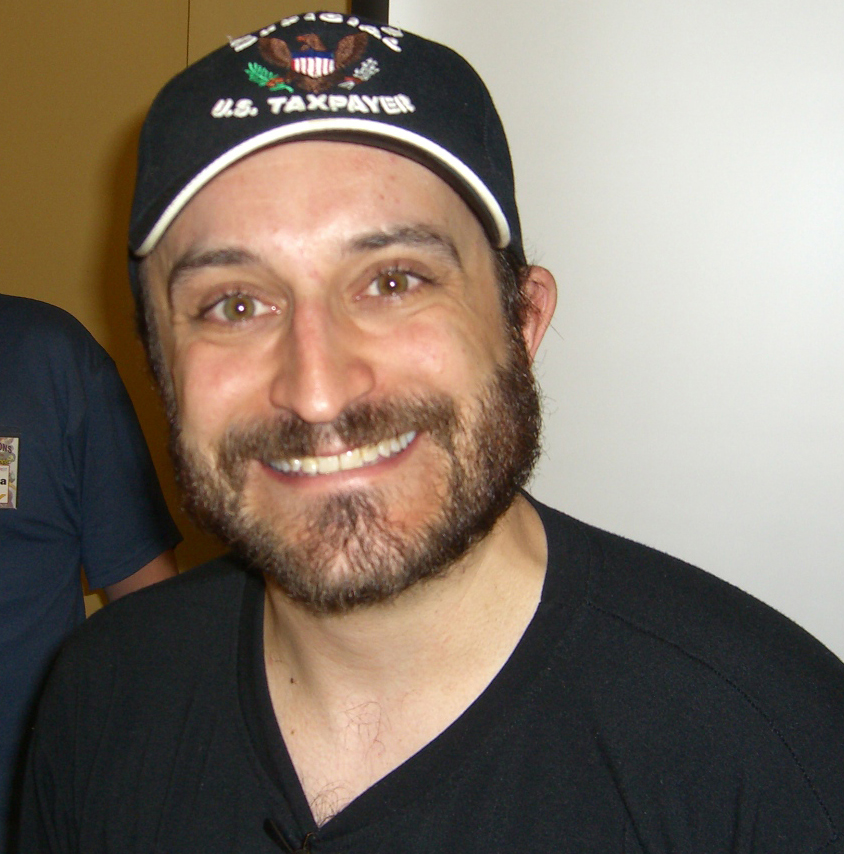
- Grayson at the Big Apple Convention in Manhattan, New York on June 8, 2008.
- Born: Vincent Penna Jr.
- Citizenship: United States
- Occupations: Voice actor, director
- Years active: 1984–present
- Spouse: Shannon Rhea Thomason (m. 2006)
- Children: 2

Vincent "Vinnie" Penna Jr., who has primarily performed using the stage name Wayne Grayson, is an American voice actor and director primarily known for his work at 4Kids Entertainment, Central Park Media, Media Blasters, NYAV Post and DuArt Film and Video.

Grayson played Joey Wheeler in the English-language version of Yu-Gi-Oh! Duel Monsters, Tokageroh in the English language versions of Shaman King and Michelangelo in the 2003 TV series Teenage Mutant Ninja Turtles.

== Early life ==
Grayson wanted to pursue acting as a child. He started doing impressions. He watched Second City Television as a child and cited Martin Short as a major influence.

== Filmography ==
=== Animation/Anime ===
Year	Title	Role	Notes	Ref.
1988–1990	Denver, the Last Dinosaur	Tom	As Arturo Sandoval	
2000–2004	Yu-Gi-Oh!	Joey Wheeler, Shadi Shin, Dartz	English dub	
2001	Animation Runner Kuromi	Hassaku Hozumi	English dub	
2003–2009	Teenage Mutant Ninja Turtles	Michelangelo		
2003	Shaman King	Tokageroh, Chrysler, Ronny of Team "Doom", Fudou	English dub	
2003–2004	Funky Cops	Additional voices	4Kids dub	
2004	Animation Runner Kuromi 2	Hassaku Hozumi	English dub	
2004–2008	Yu-Gi-Oh! GX	Syrus Truesdale, Lyman Banner	English dub	
2005	Emma – A Victorian Romance	Richard Jones	English dub	
2005	G.I. Joe: Sigma 6	Buzzer		
2005, 2015	Winx Club	Jared, Tim (Timmy)	Seasons 2 and 7	
2006	Padre Pio	Father Guardina	English dub	
2007	Ratatoing	Marcelle Toing	English dub	
2008	The Little Panda Fighter	Sweet Bear	English dub	
2008–2009	GoGoRiki	Wolliriki	English dub	
2008–2011	Yu-Gi-Oh! 5D's	Bolt Tanner, Jesse Wheeler, Dr. Fudo, Bashford, Dr. LeBlanc, Malcolm	English dub	
2009	Huntik: Secrets & Seekers	Galen, Master Storm, Otto, Silent Soldier, Suit Member, Governor of Sutos		
2010–present	Octonauts	Peso	US version	
2011	Tai Chi Chasers	Luka, Ave	English dub	
2011–2014	Yu-Gi-Oh! Zexal	Nelson Andrews/The Sparrow	English dub	
2014–2015	Astroblast!	Comet, Morg, Bloodoo, Flash, additional voices		
2014	Yu-Gi-Oh! Arc-V	Pierre L'Supérieure	English dub	
2015	Birdboy: The Forgotten Children	Parrot, Rat Father, Jonathan		
2016	Yu-Gi-Oh!: The Dark Side of Dimensions	Joey Wheeler, Solomon Muto	English dub	
2016–2017	World of Winx	Gomez		
2017	Lu over the Wall	Kujirai	English dub	
2017	Mazinger Z: Infinity	Koji Kabuto	English dub	
2018	Liz and the Blue Bird	Noboru Taki	English dub	
2018–2020	44 Cats	Wrench, Milky, Choc, Brutus		
2019	Rainbow Butterfly Unicorn Kitty	Miguel	As Arturo Sandoval	
2020	Arte	Angelo Parker	English dub	
2021	The Prince of Tennis II: Hyotei vs. Rikkai Game of Future	Masaharu Nio	English dub	
2024	Digimon Adventure 02: Digimon Hurricane Touchdown!! / Transcendent Evolution! The Golden Digimentals	Armadillomon, Upamon	English dub	

=== Live-action ===
Year	Title	Role	Notes	Ref.
1995	XX: Beautiful Beast	Shui	English dub	
1996	Close Your Eyes and Hold Me	Takayanagi	English dub	
1996	Ultraman Tiga	Daigo Madoka/Ultraman Tiga	English dub	
2000	Chelsea's Chappaqua	Joe		
2006	Thumb Wrestling Federation	Vini Vidi Victory, Gary the Intern		
2007	Exte: Hair Extensions	Jiro Tamura	English dub	
2008	Adventures in Voice Acting	Himself		
2011	Exorcists Local 667	Flammi/Flammius		
2021	New York Ninja	Rattail Man		

=== Video games ===
Year	Title	Role	Notes	Ref.
2006	One Piece: Grand Adventure	Eneru	English dub	
2006	One Piece: Pirates' Carnival	Eneru	English dub	
2009	Teenage Mutant Ninja Turtles: Turtles in Time Re-Shelled	Michelangelo, Krang, Metalhead		
2009	Teenage Mutant Ninja Turtles: Smash-Up	Michelangelo		
2012	Max Payne 3	The Local Population		
2013	Thor: The Dark World	Fandral, Dark Elf 1, Einherjar 4		
2013	Grand Theft Auto V	The Local Population		
2014	Brothers in Arms 3: Sons of War	Cole Wright		
2016	Yu-Gi-Oh! Duel Links	Joey Wheeler, Solomon Muto, Syrus Truesdale	English dub	
2018	Red Dead Redemption 2	The Local Pedestrian Population	Uncredited	
