= Kaori Asoh =

Japanese voice actress (born 1967)

- 麻生 かほ里
- Born: June 26, 1967 (age 59); Tokyo, Japan
- Occupation: Voice actress
- Years active: 1983–present
- Agent: Amuse
- Website: www.amuse.co.jp/asoh/

Kaori Asoh (麻生 かほ里, Asō Kaori; born June 26, 1967 in Tokyo) is a Japanese voice actress and theatre actress. She is also a singer and a composer, and performed songs for the Wild Arms video game series. She is managed by Amuse, Inc. She voiced the title character Ririka Moriya/Nurse Angel in Nurse Angel Ririka SOS. and sang two of the ending themes.

== Filmography ==
=== Anime ===
List of voice performances in anime
Year	Series	Role	Notes	Source
1995	Nurse Angel Ririka SOS	Ririka Moriya/Nurse Angel	Also sang two of the ending themes	
1996–98	Kodocha	Mayu Tobita		
1996–2004	Kochira Katsushika-ku Kameari Kōen-mae Hashutsujo	Ai Asato		
1998	Ojarumaru	Asako Honda, Denboko		
1999	Wild Arms: Twilight Venom	Laila Lai		
2001	Animation Runner Kuromi	Mikiko "Kuromi" Oguro	Also sang ending theme song	
2002	Bomberman Jetters	Bonn Old Woman and Mermaid 2		
2003	Sonic X	Tikal the Echidna		
2004	Shura no Toki	Ran		
2006	Anpanman	Ms. Maryne		
2007	Sakura Wars: New York, NY	Plum Spaniel		
2019	Shimajiro to Ururu no Heroland	Princess Strawberry		

=== Overseas dubbing ===
List of voice performances in overseas dubbing
Series	Role	Notes	Source
Aladdin	Princess Jasmine		
Beauty and the Beast: The Enchanted Christmas	Angelique		
The Swan Princess	Princess Odette	Singing Voice	
Cradle Will Rock			
A Goofy Movie	Roxanne		
Mary Poppins	Mary Poppins	Voice dub for Julie Andrews	
Ralph Breaks the Internet	Princess Jasmine		
The Return of Jafar	Princess Jasmine		
Street Fighter: The Legend of Chun-Li			
The Powerpuff Girls (1998)	Blossom		
Thumbelina	Thumbelina		
Vivo	Rosa		

=== Video games ===
List of voice performances in video games
Year	Series	Role	Notes	Source
1996	Dark Savior	Koyuki	Sega Saturn	
1998	Doki Doki Poyacchio	Riina	PlayStation	
1998	Sonic Adventure	Tikal the Echidna	Sega Dreamcast	
