= Grrl Power =

2004 original video animation

まかせてイルか! (Makasete Iruka)
- Genre: Comedy
- Original video animation
- Directed by: Akitaro Daichi
- Produced by: Akitaro Daichi
- Written by: Mamiko Ikeda
- Music by: Double Oats; Jun Abe; Seiji Muto
- Studio: CoMix Wave
- Released: June 10, 2004

Grrl Power, known in Japan as Makasete Iruka! (まかせてイルか) is an independent produced original video animation by Akitaro Daichi. The anime short film was released simultaneously in Japan and North America on June 10, 2004. It was licensed by ADV Films.

== Plot ==
Sora, Umi and Ao are three school-aged girls who will tackle any job: delivering lunches, to doing your homework and cleaning smokestacks, in order to amass enough money to buy a nearby island and make their own country. However, they have encountered their biggest challenge yet: to convince a boy, Rikku, to go back to school when they themselves do not go.

== Characters ==
- Sora is the de facto the leader of the group. She is the most energetic. Voiced by: Ayaka Saito (Japanese); Hilary Haag (English)
- Umi is child very much like a business woman. Specializing in beauty and planning, she believes money can solve everything. Voiced by: Yumi Higashino (Japanese); Luci Christian (English)
- Ao is confident in reaching the ultimate goal of buying the island. She is cutely hilarious and intelligent despite her impaired hearing. She communicates using sign language, which is authentically recreated in the anime. Voiced by: Kaori Nazuka (Japanese); Monica Rial (English)
- Riku is a student who refuses to go to school. He seems somewhat pompous, and is quite ignorant. Voiced by: Kaori Shimizu (Japanese); Tiffany Grant (English)

== Reception ==
The series received an Excellence Award for animation at the 2004 Japan Media Arts Festival.
