= Toshio Masuda (composer) =

Japanese composer

- Born: October 28, 1959 (age 67); Tokyo, Japan
- Genres: Soundtrack, ambient, contemporary classical
- Occupation: Composer

Toshio Masuda (増田 俊郎, Masuda Toshio; born October 28, 1959) is a Japanese composer. He has composed and synthesized scores for several Japanese television shows and animated series. Masuda is perhaps best known as the composer of the 2002 hit anime series Naruto where he combined traditional instruments like the shamisen and shakuhachi together with guitar, drums, bass, piano and other keyboard instruments along with chanting.

== Works ==
=== Animation ===
- Fatal Fury: Legend of the Hungry Wolf (1992)
- Flint the Time Detective (1998)
- Excel Saga (1999)
- Jubei-chan (1999)
- Di Gi Charat specials (2000)
- Hand Maid May (2000)
- Daa! Daa! Daa! (2000)
- Mahoromatic (2001)
- Puni Puni Poemy (2001)
- Naruto (2002)
- Ai Yori Aoshi (2002)
- Nanaka 6/17 (2003)
- Di Gi Charat: Leave it to Piyoko! (2004)
- Jubei-chan 2 (2004)
- Di Gi Charat Nyo! (2004)
- Mushishi (2005)
- Ghost Hunt (2006)
- Otogi-Jūshi Akazukin (2006)
- Higepiyo (2009)
- Kamisama Kiss (2013)
- Mushishi -Next Passage- (2014)
- Kamisama Kiss◎ (2015)
- Nobunaga no Shinobi (2016)
- Nobunaga no Shinobi: Anegawa Ishiyama-hen (2018)
- My Clueless First Friend (2023)

=== OVA ===
- Animation Runner Kuromi (2001)
- Puni Puni Poemy (2001)
- Animation Runner Kuromi2 (2003)

=== Specials ===
- Mushi-Shi Special: The Shadow That Devours the Sun (2014)
- Mushi-Shi -Next Passage- Special: Path of Thorns (2014)

=== Film ===
- Naruto the Movie: Ninja Clash in the Land of Snow (2004)
- Naruto the Movie: Legend of the Stone of Gelel (2005)
- Naruto the Movie: Guardians of the Crescent Moon Kingdom (2006)
- Mushi-Shi -Next Passage- Special: Bell Droplets (2015)
