= Rika Komatsu =

Japanese voice actress and singer (born February 25)

- 小松 里歌
- Born: February 25; Kōchi Prefecture, Japan
- Other name: Rika Komatsu (小松 里賀)
- Occupations: Voice actress; singer
- Years active: 1996–present
- Agent: Aoni Production
- Spouse: 1
- Website: Official profile

Rika Komatsu (小松 里歌, Komatsu Rika) is a Japanese voice actress and singer from Kōchi Prefecture affiliated with Aoni Production. Her former stage name was Rika Komatsu (小松 里賀, Komatsu Rika)

== Filmography ==
=== Television animation ===
- Animation Runner Kuromi (Announcer, Yuri)
- Animation Runner Kuromi 2 (Yuri)
- Battle B-Daman (Asado)
- Boys Be... (Jyunna Morio)
- Pretty Cure (Butler Zakenna A)
- Futari wa Pretty Cure: Max Heart (Pyuan)
- Hijikata Toshizou: Shiro no Kiseki (Toshizou Hijikata (child))
- Kirby: Right Back at Ya! (Tuff)
- Mamotte Shugogetten (Letter (ep.7), resident (ep.8))
- Matantei Loki Ragnarok (Reiya Ooshima)
- The Mythical Detective Loki Ragnarok (Reiya Ohshima)
- Cyborg Kuro-chan (Kotaro)
- Nessa no Haou Gandalla (Emma Branton)
- Oden-kun (Chikuwabu, Ginnan bouzu, Susie)
- Ojarumaru (Kintarou Sakata (ep.181-270))
- One Piece (Chabo, Marie)
- Shin Hakkenden (Noburu)
- SD Gundam Sangokuden Brave Battle Warriors (Kan-pei Gundam)
- Tokyo Mew Mew (Lucha, Pudding's mother (ep.20))
- Yu-Gi-Oh! (Female student, Kaoruko Bodyguard (ep.19))

=== Video games ===
- Dynasty Warriors and Warriors Orochi series (Diaochan)
- Dream Mix TV: World Fighters (Kiji)
- Dream Mix TV: World Fighters (Minibonbi)
- Dream Mix TV: World Fighters (Momotaro)
- Riviera: The Promised Land (Rose)
- Rune Factory Frontier (Lucia/Minerva)
- Growlanser (Louise Fallsmeyer)

=== Dubbing ===
- Dynasty Warriors (Diaochan (Gulnazar))

== Discography ==
- Tokyo Mew Mew: My Sweet Heart", "Glider", "My Days: Ano Hi wo Wasurenai", "Hello Brand-New Love: Koi wa Sugi Soko".
