= Wild Knights Gulkeeva =

Japanese anime television series

獣戦士ガルキーバ (Jūsenshi Garukība)
- Created by: Hajime Yatate
- Anime television series
- Directed by: Masamitsu Hidaka
- Written by: Kenichi Kanemaki
- Music by: Kenji Kawai
- Studio: Sunrise
- Original network: TXN (TV Tokyo)
- Original run: April 4, 1995 – September 26, 1995
- Episodes: 26

Wild Knights Gulkeeva (獣戦士ガルキーバ, Jūsenshi Garukība; lit. Beast Warriors Gulkeeva) is an anime television series that debuted in 1995. A manga was concurrently serialized in Shōnen Sunday Super.

== Synopsis ==
The story takes place in a world known as Earthside, which exists along with three other inhabited worlds, Nosfertia, Heavenstia, and Eternalia. When beings known as Darknoids descended from Nosfertia and began their assault on Earthside, Heavenstia sent 3 Animanoids (beast-humans) to prevent an invasion. Meanwhile, the protagonist, Touya, who believed himself to be a human discovered that he was actually a being of Eternalia. With this in mind, Touya fights beside the Animanoids to defend Earthside.

== Characters ==
Touya Shinjou (神城 桃矢, Shinjō Tōya)
Voiced by: Tetsuya Iwanaga
An ordinary teenager who is told by his parents that he is a being who hails from the world of Eternalia and the reincarnation of a legendary knight known as Radias. He must now fight along his beast guardians in order to protect Japan from siege.
Greyfus
Voiced by: Kazuya Ichijou
Greyfus is a wolf.
Beakwood
Voiced by: Kenichi Sakaguchi
Beakwood is an eagle.
Garriel
Voiced by: Naoki Makishima
Garriel is a gorilla.
Kira Kongou (金剛 煌, Kongō Kira)
Voiced by: Yō Kitazawa
Konoha Maihara (舞原 このは, Maihara Konoha)
Voiced by: Michiko Neya
