= Bayala: A Magical Adventure =

2019 computer-animated fantasy adventure film

- Film poster
- Directed by: Aina Jarvine
- Written by: Vanessa Walder (script)
- Produced by: Emely Christians
- Production companies: Ulysses Films; Fabrique d'images Universum Film
- Distributed by: Universum Film/Walt Disney Studios Motion Pictures Germany
- Release date: 1 May 2019 (International Festival of Animated Film)
- Running time: 85 minutes
- Countries: Germany; Luxembourg
- Languages: German; English
- Box office: $826,607

Bayala: A Magical Adventure (German: Bayala - Das magische Elfenabenteuer; released in some European countries as The Fairy Princess and the Unicorn) is a 2019 German-Luxembourgish 3D computer-animated high fantasy adventure film directed by Aina Jarvine and co-directed by Federico Milella from a script by Venessa Walder. The film is based on the toyline of the same name by German manufacturer Schleich.

== Plot ==
In the land of Bayala, elves and dragons live in harmony, the elves watching over dragon eggs until the Dragon's Feast, where they return the newly-hatched dragons to their parents, their bond strengthening the land's magic. One day, however, Ophira, the queen of the shadow elves, steals the dragon eggs and abducts Surah, princess of the sun elves. With the dragons gone, the land begins to wilt away while Ophira grows in strength. Years later, Surah manages to escape the shadow realm with the help of her friends Jaro and Nuray, Ophira's niece, but growing up in the shadow realm results in her gaining the wings and magical abilities of a shadow elf.

Years later, on the coronation of Crown Princess Eyela of the sun elves, young elf Marween discovers what she believes to be a talking rock, only for the elves to realize it is a hatching dragon egg. Eyela plans a new Dragon's Feast, but it is only possible with royalty from all the elven tribes, including the shadow elves. The elves decide that Surah and Jaro will go to the shadow realm to retrieve Nuray, while Surah's twin sister Sera and Marween will take the baby dragon, Nugur, to his parents at Dragon's Peak, while Eyela gathers the other elven royalty to prepare for the feast. As the group travels through the woods, Ophira, growing suspicious of their intentions, summons a storm spell to attack them, but Surah counteracts it with her own storm spell. They arrive at the home of Magus Bilara, who teaches Surah not to view her shadow elf abilities as being evil. Bilara supplies the group with a boat and sends them across the lake to the path to Dragon's Peak, but Ophira, spying on the group with her ravens, discovers Nugur and sends another storm spell, causing the group to crash on the shore of the shadow realm.

With little options available, Surah resolves to send Marween to take Nugur to Dragon's Peak alone while the rest goes to retrieve Nuray. Using Surah's bird Kuack to distract the ravens, the group manages to escape and splits off. Ophira sends her shadow to contact the group, offering to trade Nuray for Nugur. As the group arrives at Shadow Rock, they are taken prisoner, but Ophira discovers they don't have the dragon and sends her ravens to Dragon's Peak to retrieve him. Meanwhile, Marween takes Nugur to Dragon's Peak and successfully reunites him with his parents. At Shadow Rock, the group defeats Ophira's guards while Surah battles Ophira. While initially overpowered, the magic of the reunited dragons strengthens her magic and allows her to defeat Ophira, turning her to stone. The dragon statues on Shadow Rock are destroyed, revealing the stolen dragon eggs hidden within them.

Nuray is crowned as the new queen of the shadow elves and returns the dragon eggs to Solstice Rock, where the elven tribes have gathered for Dragon's Feast. Marween is announced as the royal liaison to the dragons and is taken as Bilara's apprentice. The united elven tribes celebrate the return of the dragons and the restoration of magic to Bayala.

== Voice cast ==
=== English cast ===
- Madison Mullahey as Surah
- Jessica Webb as Sera
- Olivia Manning as Marween
- Sara Petersen as Eyela
- Marc Thompson as Falaroy
- Gregory Max as Jaro
- Lisa Ortiz as Ophira
- Rebecca Becker as Nuray
- Kathryn Cahill as Bilara
- Louise White as Feya
- Shannon Conley as Ice Queen
- Andrew Watts as Rainbow King
- David Wills as Forest King
- Michael Kargus as Piuh

== Release ==
Bayala had its world premiere at the 26th International Festival of Animated Film in Stuttgart on 1 May 2019, and was released in German theatres on 24 October of the same year. It had a worldwide gross of $771,969. Bayala was released on digital and video on demand on 4 August 2020.

Critically, the film received generally negative reviews.

== Video game adaptation ==
A video game adaptation, Bayala - The Game, was released for the Nintendo Switch, Steam and PlayStation 4 in October 2019 and was developed by Independent Arts Software.
