= Carried by the Wind: Tsukikage Ran =

Television series

- DVD Cover of Bandai's Vol. 4 featuring Ran (left) and Meow (right)

風まかせ月影蘭 (Kazemakase Tsukikage Ran)
- Anime television series
- Directed by: Akitaro Daichi
- Written by: Akitaro Daichi; Yōsuke Kuroda; Mamiko Ikeda
- Music by: Toshihiko Sahashi
- Studio: Madhouse
- Licensed by: US: Bandai Entertainment
- Original network: WOWOW
- Original run: January 26, 2000 – April 19, 2000
- Episodes: 13

Carried by the Wind: Tsukikage Ran (風まかせ月影蘭, Kazemakase Tsukikage Ran) is an animated action comedy written and directed by Akitaro Daichi, and produced by Madhouse Studios. The television series follows Ran and Meow, two wanderers who face all sorts of antagonists in Tokugawa Japan.

The series started airing on WOWOW. Afterwards, it aired as Ran: The Samurai Girl on Animax Latin America and Animax Asia, which also broadcast Bandai's dub across Southeast Asia and South Asia. The series is licensed in North America by Bandai Entertainment. The anime premiered on Tubi.

== Plot ==
Tsukikage Ran comprises thirteen self-contained stories. The series follows characters Ran and Meow into a new town, where they encounter some kind of wrongdoing. Every episode climaxes with a sword fight featuring the protagonist, sometimes aided by Meow's martial arts prowess.

== Characters ==
=== Main characters ===
Ran Tsukikage (月影蘭, Tsukikage Ran)
Voiced by: Reiko Yasuhara (Japanese); Mona Marshall (English)
Ran is a sake-loving ronin who goes "wherever the wind takes her". Ran's skill with the katana makes her unbeatable, but like so many ronin, she is often broke and has Meow pay her (often considerable) restaurant tabs. It is a wonder how Meow always seems to have enough money, and where she gets it, while Ran often lacks it. Meow is quite generous to Ran and supports her daily necessities throughout the series. Unlike most Samurai, she fights with the katana one handed.
Even though Ran has a laid-back attitude, she is very sharp, perceptive, wise, and intelligent. She is kind, and has a good sense of justice. Ran cares about Meow and other people who are in need, although she usually does not have much interest in anything around her. Ran tends to say "utterly inexcusable" whenever she's annoyed.

Meow (ミャオ, Myao)
Voiced by: Akemi Okamura (Japanese); Michelle Ruff (English)
Meow is a Chinese martial artist skilled in the Iron Cat Fist (猫鉄拳, Nekotekken) style. Meow has a heart of gold, but she's extremely bold and not that bright--which means she's often butting into other people's business. Despite her recklessness, Ran respects her for her good intentions and kind heart, if not her wallet, and bails her out in the end. Meow respects Ran and looks up to her and is quite obedient to Ran, although she realizes she often has been taken advantage of by Ran and also dislikes Ran's attitude at times. Although not quite as skilled as Ran, Meow can handle herself in a fight. On contrast with Ran, who is usually of a calm and has cool composure, Meow is very cheerful and energetic, but very slow and flighty.

=== Other characters ===
Tonto Sharakusai
Voiced by: Chō (Japanese); Doug Stone (English)
Tonto appears in episode 5. He is an ukiyo-e artist looking for a beautiful woman to model for a portrait. Tonto and Meow are taken prisoners by the artist's patrons until Ran rescues them.
Mei
Voiced by: Azusa Nakao (Japanese); Lynn Fischer (English)
Mei appears in episode 9. She is Meow's childhood friend. Her parents' deaths led Mei to become an opium dealer. In the middle of a fight with Meow, she is fatally stabbed by an opium-addicted swordsman. Just before her last breath she regrets for taking the wrong way in her life and admits that the way she dies is pretty good for her.
Stephanie
Voiced by: Julie Ann Taylor
Stephanie appears in episode 10. This large, abnormally strong young woman is a foreigner with a strong interest in Japan and Japanese culture who usually fights with a tree trunk that she uses like a quarterstaff. Convinced the country's population is made up of samurai, ninja and geisha, she travels to Japan in the hope of being trained in the way of the sword. After meeting her, Ran and Meow make several attempts to be rid of Stephanie due to her ability to eat twice as much as Ran herself, thus putting an even greater strain on their money supply. Later, after a chance encounter on opposite sides of a yakuza gang war, Stephanie challenges Ran to a duel believing that winning would make her a full samurai. Ran barely wins by getting a sleeper hold on Stephanie from behind. Afterwards, Stephanie decides to return to her home country to pursue her dream of becoming a samurai one day. Stephanie is notable in that, through sheer strength alone, she is only one in the series who nearly defeats Ran in a fight.
Shiina Junzaburo
Voiced by: Keiji Fujiwara (Japanese); Steven Blum (English)
Shiina appears in episode 13. He taught Ran swordsmanship and also introduced her to sake. At the time of the series, Shiina works as bodyguard (用心棒, yojimbo) to the head of a martial arts dōjō. He gets his arm broken by Ran and forced to give up the sword for Otsuta, a geisha who loves him. The title of episode 13, "She Hid A Romance In The Past", and Ran's remarks to him in the episode possibly imply that Shiina in the past was supposed to run away with Ran but had second thoughts, leaving Ran to leave alone. He feels extremely guilty for making Ran go alone.

== Production ==
Tsukikage Ran is inspired by chanbara series like 1965's Su-ronin Tsukikage Hyogo. While it remains faithful to the genre, it is infused with Akitaro Daichi's distinctive style. The episodes were scripted by first thinking of a title and writing a plot about it. As many ideas were not used, director Daichi notes an unproduced episode where the protagonists "fight over udon or soba" noodles.

The score was composed by Toshihiko Sahashi. The opening theme song Kazemakase ("Leave it to the wind" or "Carried by the Wind") is an enka ballad performed by Akemi Misawa. The ending theme Kazemakase 2 ("Leave it to the wind 2") is performed by Reiko Yasuhara.

=== Staff ===
- Original creator and director: Akitaro Daichi
- Directorial advisor: Hiroaki Sakurai
- Character design: Hajime Watanabe
- Chief animation director: Takahiro Yoshimatsu
- Art director: Hidetoshi Kaneko
- Director of photography: Hitoshi Yamaguchi
- Music: Toshihiko Sahashi
- Sound director: Kazuya Tanaka
- Animation production: Madhouse
- Production: Bandai Visual

== Media ==
=== Episodes ===
No.	Title	Original release date
1	"She's Tough for a Woman"; Transliteration: "Onnadatera ni Tsuyokatta" (Japanese: 女だてらに強かった)	January 26, 2000
2	"Sake Made the Tears Sting"; Transliteration: "Sake ni Namida ga Shimiteita" (Japanese: 酒に涙がしみていた)	February 2, 2000
3	"Suddenly, I was a Mother"; Transliteration: "Ikinari Haha ni Natteita" (Japanese: いきなり母になっていた)	February 9, 2000
4	"I Was a Target Before I Knew It"; Transliteration: "Shiranai Aida ni Nerawareta" (Japanese: 知らない間に狙われた)	February 16, 2000
5	"It Was Pretty Amazing When I Stripped"; Transliteration: "Nuidara Kekkō Sugokatta" (Japanese: 脱いだら結構すごかった)	February 23, 2000
6	"The Mole Was in the Wrong Place"; Transliteration: "Hokuro no Ichi ga Chigatteta" (Japanese: ホクロの位置が違ってた)	March 1, 2000
7	"I Buzzed with Electricity"; Transliteration: "Ereki de Biribiri Shibireteta" (Japanese: エレキでビリビリしびれてた)	March 8, 2000
8	"There Was No God in This World"; Transliteration: "Kono Yo nya Kami Nado Inakatta" (Japanese: この世にゃ神などいなかった)	March 15, 2000
9	"I Counted on an Enemy"; Transliteration: "Ate ni Shitetara Tekidatta" (Japanese: 当てにしてたら敵だった)	March 22, 2000
10	"That European Girl was Huge"; Transliteration: "Nanban Musume wa Dekakatta" (Japanese: 南蛮娘はデカかった)	March 29, 2000
11	"Vengeance Made Himself an Enemy"; Transliteration: "Kataki ga Teki ni Natteita" (Japanese: 仇が敵になっていた)	April 5, 2000
12	"I Was So Crucified I Didn't Know What to Do!"; Transliteration: "Haritsukerarete Komatteta" (Japanese: 磔られて困ってた)	April 12, 2000
13	"She Hid a Romance in the Past"; Transliteration: "Kako ni Romansu Kakushiteta" (Japanese: 過去にロマンス隠してた)	April 19, 2000

=== Drama CD ===
Kazemakase Tsukikage Ran CD-neta ni Tottoita (VICL-60545) is an audio drama released May 24, 2000, by Victor Entertainment. It features Ayako Kawasumi as the voice of Princess Tama.

== Reception ==
Jacob Churosh of T.H.E.M. Anime Reviews gave the TV series 4 out of 5 stars stating, " It manages to be exciting and funny at the same time, and also offers an alternate perspective on the live-action samurai shows that seem to populate Japanese TV on a regular basis; in fact, it seems intended to parody them."
