= Hiroko Konishi =

Japanese voice actress and musician (born 1975)

- 小西 寛子
- Born: October 26, 1975 (age 50); Kawagoe, Saitama, Japan
- Education: Chuo University
- Occupations: Voice actress; Musician; Artificial intelligence researcher
- Years active: 1994–present
- Agent: Office Squirrel
- Height: 161 cm (5 ft 3 in)
- Musical career
- Genres: J-Pop; Folk; Rock; anison
- Instruments: Vocals; guitar; Flute; Drums
- Labels: Nippon Columbia; King; Wolfgang
- Website: hirokokonishi.com

Hiroko Konishi (小西 寛子, Konishi Hiroko; born October 26, 1975) is a Japanese voice actress, musician and AI researcher. She is known for her roles as Jiyuu Nanohana in Jubei-chan, Sae Sawanoguchi in Magic User's Club, Nene Romanova in Bubblegum Crisis Tokyo 2040, and the title character Ojarumaru. In video games she voiced Shiori Misaka in the original Kanon visual novel, Lilith Aensland in Darkstalkers, and Bridget in Guilty Gear X2.

== Life and career ==
Konishi formed a budding interest in stage acting as a junior high student, and as a high schooler, received voice training at the Nihon Narration Engi Kenkyūjo before being affiliated with Arts Vision from 1994 to 1996.

She formed the musical unit Little Cure in 1999, a techno-pop project under the Wolfgang Label, with members including NAOMI and Yuki (and producer Hiroko Konishi herself).

As a TV personality, she has appeared on both NHK and public sector network shows. She had been a regular on the TV Tokyo-syndicated variety show Ichioshi Kiss, where she was portrayed as the youngest of three sisters, with co-stars Risa Stegmayer and Hinako Saeki. She was also narrator for the short-lived "pick of the week" show Ichioshi. She also acted in live action TV Commercials for "Dial 104" (cellphone directory assistance), as keitai detective PI Hiroko.

In 2018, Konishi claimed that she was replaced as Ojarumaru in Prince Mackaroo from disputes over her voice recording on Ojarumaru dolls and other merchandise. Motivated by the MeToo movement, Konishi shared that she left voice acting after being sexually harassed and witnessing her other female peers abused by their agencies. She also alleged that she was propositioned by her manager Hara to enter a mixed bath in the nude with Akitaro Daichi and claimed that she was unable to get voice acting work after she refused.

In 2019, Hiroko Konishi provided the first ever voice for the character Natchan (playing both Natchan and Erika) in the work Natchan by renowned Japanese manga artist Jun Tanaka, which was previously serialized in *Super Jump*, a manga magazine published by Shueisha

In 2020, she was involved in the "Ichi kara Wakaru" (Understanding from Scratch) educational and opinion animation series, produced by iRONNA, the official video platform of Sankei Shimbun Digital, one of Japan's major newspaper companies. She was responsible for the planning, composition, and script, in addition to voicing the character "Minamikaze Hiroko"

Konishi notes on her official site, hirokokonishi.com, that detailed descriptions of her works are relatively limited outside Japan. For this reason, she encourages the use of her website as a primary source when referencing her artistic activities and career.

In 2025, to commemorate the 80th anniversary of the end of World War II and to reflect on Hiroshima, she announced the release of a memorial digital mini-album titled Haruka no shima (Japanese: 遙カノ島), which is also referred to as "A Faraway Island" in English. The album features original songs that were composed, performed, and produced by Konishi herself.

On October 26, 2025, LITTLE CURE released the EP album Retro Vibes 199X worldwide to commemorate the 25th anniversary of the unit's formation. This is the unit's third album, featuring a total of eight tracks (including a bonus track). Characterized by its recreation of 1980s–1990s analog dance culture through Eurodance and technopop sounds, the album evokes the warmth of analog vinyl and the excitement of the golden age of rhythm games in a modern context. The songs, with lyrics by Hiroko Konishi, center on themes of youthful memories, aiming to bridge the experiences of longtime fans from the 1990s dance music scene with new listeners. In Japan, the album debuted at No. 95 on the iTunes Store overall album chart but reached No. 22 on October 27, while topping the Electronic Albums chart continuously from release day.

Alongside her career as an actress and musician, Konishi was influenced by her father, a doctor of engineering and patent holder, and began programming in elementary school. Drawing on years of IT experience, she later established her own research laboratory to pursue artificial intelligence research. She has published preprints exploring ideas such as what she calls "Quantum-Bio-Hybrid AGI" and "Synthesis Intelligence".

In November 2025, Konishi published a preprint in which she claims to have identified three structural failure modes in a production-grade LLM: the False-Correction Loop, Authority-Bias Dynamics, and the Novel Hypothesis Suppression Pipeline. The findings were widely discussed online and referenced by Brian Roemmele and Elon Musk. In November 2025, Konishi's research on structural failure modes in large language models, particularly the "False-Correction Loop", received attention in technology media.

== Filmography ==
=== Anime ===
List of voice performances in anime
Year	Title	Role	Notes	Source
1995	Tenchi Universe	Mirei		
1995	Fushigi Yûgi	Girl (A)		
1995	H2	Boy		
1995	Mojacko	Yumi		
1996	Alien from the Darkness	Hikari	Adult OVA	
1996	Brave Command Dagwon	Minako Hashiba		
1996	Ninja Cadets	Sakura	OVA	
1996	Kodocha	Shota Nakao		
1996	Magic User's Club	Sae Sawanoguchi	OVA	
1996	You're Under Arrest	Sena Wakabayashi/Sena Nakajima	1996 TV series	
1996	Jewel BEM Hunter Lime	Store Clerk	OVA	
1997	Kindaichi Case Files	Yoshino, Mikoto Mizuki		
1997	Crayon Kingdom of Dreams	Horesore		
1997	Anime Ganbare Goemon	Rumie Himuro		
1997	Dr. Slump	Akane Kimidori	2nd TV series	
1997	Agent Aika	Rion Aida	OVA series	
1997	I Dream of Mimi	Kanako Shimada	OVA	
1998	Sexy Commando Gaiden: Sugoi yo!! Masaru-san	Tomoe Kitahara (Moe-moe)		
1998	Bomberman B-Daman Bakugaiden	Pinkubon		
1998	Kocchi Muite! Miiko	Yuka Kobayashi		
1998	Fushigi Mahou Fan Fan Pharmacy	Kaori Nishino (potpourri)		
1998	Heritako Pooh-chan	Mimitan / mirin-chan's mother		
1998	DT Eightron	Quilt		
1998	Super Radical Gag Family	Akane Kikuchi		
1998	Ojarumaru	Ojarumaru		
1998	St. Luminous Mission High School	Shizuku Kabe		
1998	Bubblegum Crisis Tokyo 2040	Nene Romanova		
1998	If I See You in My Dreams	Miho Hamaoka	TV series	
1998	Seikimatsu Leader den Takeshi!	Mitsuru Imai	OVA	
1999	Ojamajo Doremi	Hehe		
1999	Digimon Adventure	Takeru Takaishi		
1999	Jubei-chan	Jiyuu Nanohara		
1999	D4 Princess	Nejiru Gaou, Nejiri Gaou		
1999	I'm Gonna Be An Angel	Silky		
1999	Magic User's Club	Sae Sawanoguchi	TV series	
1999	Mito's Great Adventure: The Two Queens	Hioko	TV series	
1999	Now and Then, Here and There	Boo		
1999	Sol Bianca: The Legacy	Meio	OVA	
2000	Gatekeepers	Misao Sakimori		

=== Film ===
List of voice performances in film
Year	Title	Role	Notes	Source
1999	Doctor Slump: Arale's Surprise	Akane Kimidori		
2000	Digimon Adventure: Our War Game!	Takeru Takaishi		
2000	Ojarumaru the Movie: The Promised Summer – Ojaru and Semira	Ojarumaru Sakanoue		

=== Video games ===
List of voice performances in video games
Year	Title	Role	Notes	Source
1995	ja:戦国サイバー 藤丸地獄変	Kaname of Oborokage	PS1	
1996	Mega Man 8	Roll, Eddie	PS1/SS	
1996	Fire Woman Matoigumi	Lemon	Also PS version in 1998	
1996–1997	Darkstalkers series	Lilith Aensland	Arcade	
1996	Magic School Lunar	Lena	Sega Saturn	
1997	Mega Man Battle & Chase	Roll, Iceman	PS1	
1997	Ryuuki Denshou 2	Melky Caring	Windows	
1997	Voice Fantasia series	Weep	Sega Saturn, PS1/PS2	
1997	Magic School Lunar!	Lena	Sega Saturn	
1998	Mitsumete Knight	Sophia Roberinge	PS1/PS2	
1998	Brave Fencer Musashi	Mint	PS1	
1998	Pounding Poyatchio ja:どきどきポヤッチオ	Cynthia	PS1	
1998	Night R Adventures Hen Staring ja:みつめてナイトR 大冒険編	Sophia Roberinge	PS1	
1999	Captain Love ja:キャプテン・ラヴ	Kaori Kondo	PS1	
1999	Persona 2: Innocent Sin	Lisa Silverman	PS1/PSP	
1999	The Misadventures of Tron Bonne	Danish Marmalade	PS1	
1999	ja:Little Lovers SHE SO GAME	Nana Ogihara	PS1	
1999	Revive: Resuscitation	Aoi Fujisawa	Dreamcast, also Adult PC in 2003	
1999	Gatekeepers	Misao Sakimori	PS1/PS2	
1999	Yukyu Fantasia 3 Perpetual blue 悠久幻想曲3 Perpetual blue	Cher Acis	DC	
2000	Grandia II	Elena	Dreamcast	
2000	Kanon series	Shiori Misaka	Dreamcast, PS2	
2000	Persona 2: Eternal Punishment	Lisa Silverman	PS1/PSP	
2001	Digimon Rumble Arena	Takeru Takaishi	PS1	
2002	Guilty Gear X2	Bridget	PS2, Arcade	
2004	Darkstalkers Chronicle: The Chaos Tower	Lilith	PSP	

=== Audio dramas ===
List of voice performances in audio dramas
Title	Role	Notes	Source
Agent Aika	Rion Aida		
Fruits Basket	Tohru Honda		
Kindaichi Case Files: Devil Suite Murder Cast	Yuka Mido		
Kyuukyoku Parodius	Mona		

== Discography ==
=== Albums ===
Sophia (ソフィア, Sofia) (King Records, 1998, KICA-7900) Novelette (EMI Music Japan, 1999, TYCY-10025) 1975 (Wolfgang Label Japan, 2020, DSQI-20815) Her Cabriolet 80s (女のカブリオレ80S, Kanojo no Cabriolet 80s) (Wolfgang Label, 2022, DSQI-22001) 1975 Kaze no Kisetu (1975 風の季節, 1975 Season of the Wind) (Wolfgang Label, 2024, DSQI-24011)

=== Digital albums ===
- 1975 Kaze no Kisetu (2024, Wolfgang Label)
  - Akai Ribbon no Koro (赤いリボンの頃)
  - Shio Kaze no Koi (潮風の恋)
  - Natsu no Koibana 1987 (夏の恋花1987)
  - Kokoro no Shiroi Hana (こころの白い花)
  - Jizouzaka (地蔵坂)
  - Tachidomazu ni (立ち止まらずに)
  - Kaze ni Yureru Hinaichigo (風に揺れる雛菊)
  - Kurai Taiyou (暗い太陽)
  - Tsugumi (ツグミ)
  - Kaze no Kisetu no Uta (風の季節のうた)
  - 1975
- Haruka no Shima (遥カノ島, Distant Island) (2025, Wolfgang Label)
  - Minato no Ballad (港のバラッド)
  - Soda Water
  - Sandy Road (サンディロード)
  - 1975
  - Miyuki Bashi (みゆき橋)
  - Haruka Shima (遥島)

=== Singles ===
- Don't Love (1999, TYDY-2125) – Opening theme for TV Tokyo's Music Break

=== Digital singles ===
- Sayonara Arigato ~Mori e Kaetta Mahoutsukai (2013, DSQI-12011)
- But She Was in Love (2014, DSQI-12012)
- An Amulet in His Pocket (2015, DSQI-12013)
- You Always Stay by Me (2015, DSQI-12014)
- Her Name Was Ka Leo (2016, DSQI-12015)
- She May Be Here (2016, DSQI-12016)
- Wheelchair (2017, DSQI-12017)
- Anata ni Arigato (2017, DSWG-11011)
- She May Be Here (Requiem) (2019)
- 23 Sai (2020, DSWG-12011)
- Natsu no Koibana 1987 (2020, DSQI-20817)
- Jizouzaka (2020, DSQI-12818)
- Tachidomazu ni (2020, DSQI-12819)
- Kaze no Kisetu no Uta (2020, DSQI-12820)
- Shio Kaze no Koi (Instrumental) (2020, DSQI-12816)
- Tsugumi (Music Video) (2023)
- Kurai Taiyou (2024)
- Kaze ni Yureru Hinaichigo(2024)
- She May Be Here (2025)

=== Band/unit ===
Little Cure

- Silver E・tude (2000, COCA-15360)
  - "Silver E・tude"
  - "Fall in with All"
  - "No, No, Tension"
  - "Dear, Natary"
- Bit of Love (2000, COCA-15367)
  - "Bit of Love Full Ver."
  - "full moon"
  - "LET ME FEEL SO HIGH"
  - "Leo into the Universe"
- Retro Vibes 199X (2025, DSQI-25126)
  - "Born Under the Sky"
  - "Her Sweet Cabriolet"
  - "My23"
  - "Ka-leo of the Wind"
  - "With My Magic"
  - "Dance for You"
  - "By the Light"
  - "My 1992 Story" (bonus track)

=== Character singles ===
The following is a list of character songs performed by Hiroko Konishi, primarily associated with her voice acting roles in anime, games, and related media.

=== Character songs ===
- "Anatani Ainiyuku" (1995, SRCL-3443)
- "GIRLS SUNSHINE" (1996, TYDY-2066) as NINJAGIRLS
- "Nobody Knows" (1996, TYDY-2067) as Hiroko Konishi
- "Senobi wo shite Follow You" (1996, TYDY-2065) as Mahoutsukai Tai!
- "Kiite yo Diary" (1996, TYDY-2073)
- "Koneko Neko Neko March" (1996, BVCH-639)
- "The Magic Girls' Medley" (1996, TYCY-5534) as Mahoutsukai Tai!
- "Mahou Tsukai Tai! Ondo" (1996, TYCY-5534)
- "More Natural" (1997, CODC-1231)
- "More Natural" (1997, COCC-14337)
- "Mahou Club no Uta" (1997, TYCY-5558)
- "Ohayou! Jeff-kun" (1997, TYCY-5558)
- "Kitto Kitto..." (1997, TYCY-5558) – lyrics by Hiroko Konishi
- "More Natural (Super Remix Version)" (1997, COCC-14492)
- "Ano Hi no Mama de" (1997, VICL-60080) as Chie & Sena
- "MY ENERGY" (1998, VBCD-0010) as Yoko Asada, chorus by Hiroko Konishi
- "Kienai Yuuki" (1998, VBCD-0010) as Yoko Asada, chorus by Hiroko Konishi
- "Eien Janai" (1998, VBCD-0010) as Yoko Asada, chorus by Hiroko Konishi
- "▽ no STAIRWAY" (1998, KICA-7853) as Milky
- "Kisetsu Hazure no Himawari" (1998, KCIA-7858)
- "Koi wa Totsuzen" (1998, KICA-7870) as Sofia Roberinge
- "Mitsumete" (1998, KICA-7870) as Sofia Roberinge
- "Ashita wo Yumemite" (1998, KICA-7870) as Sofia Roberinge
- "SWEET SWEET MEMORY-S" (1998, MGCD-1060)
- "Uta wo Tonaeba" (1998, KICA-7881) as Sofia Roberinge
- "Akanee-chan no Uta" (1998, AMCM-4393)
- "Yume wo Shinjite" (1998, KICA-7886) as Sofia Roberinge
- "Kimi to Deaete (Game Size Ver.)" (1998, KICA-7925) as Sofia
- "Yume no Jikan" (1998, KICA-7926) as Sofia Roberinge
- "Kimi to Deaete" (1998, KICA-7926) as Sofia Roberinge
- "EN PRIVE" (1999, TKCA-71561) as Miho Hamaoka
- "Love! On Time Yumemiru Street" (1999, FSCA-10079) as Aoi Minamiyama
- "Love! On Time Yumemiru Street (Special Mix)" (1999, FSCA-10079)
- "PERFECT WORLD" (1999, VICL-60233) as Nana Hagiwara
- "Stay With Me" (1999, VICL-60233) as Nana Hagiwara
- "Tenkousei Lovelys" (1999, VICL-60382) – lyrics and vocals by Hiroko Konishi
- "Tenkousei Lovelys Gakuensai Version" (1999, VICL-60382)
- "Purin de Ojaru" (1999, CRDA-1003) as Ojarumaru
- "Mattari Ondo" (1999, CRDA-1003) as Ojarumaru
- "Over the Rainbow" (1999, TYDY-2124) as Mahoutsukai Tai!
- "JOKER" (1999, KICA-5043) as MUSES
- "Don't Love" (1999, TYDY-2125)
- "Flower of the Truth" (1999, TYDY-2125)
- "Banshuu no Tolstoy" (1999, PCCG-00514)
- "Be All Right... Takeru Takaishi no Theme" (2000, NECA-30010) – lyrics and vocals by Hiroko Konishi
- "Mitsuketa Kiseki" (2000, SBIX-2000) as TINKER BELL (incl. Hiroko Konishi)
- "Nikoniko Ginza de Oshopping" (2003, FFAN-2003)
- "Shiawase Hitotsu Futatsu... (Gekichuu Uta Version)" (2003, FFAN-2003)
- "Shiawase Hitotsu Futatsu... (New Take.2003)" (2003, FFAN-2003)
