= Ninja Girl & Samurai Master =

Japanese manga series

- First tankōbon volume cover, featuring Chidori

信長の忍び (Nobunaga no Shinobi)
- Genre: Comedy, historical
- Manga
- Written by: Naoki Shigeno
- Published by: Hakusensha
- Magazine: Young Animal
- Original run: June 13, 2008 – July 25, 2025
- Volumes: 23
- Manga

Nobunaga no Shinobi: Owari Tōitsu-ki
- Written by: Naoki Shigeno
- Published by: Hakusensha
- Magazine: Young Animal Arashi
- Original run: November 2, 2012 – May 2, 2017
- Volumes: 3
- Manga

Gunshi Kuroda Kanbee Den
- Written by: Naoki Shigeno
- Published by: Hakusensha
- Magazine: Young Animal Densi (2013–2017); Manga Park (2017–present)
- Original run: April 26, 2013 – present
- Volumes: 7
- Manga

Masamune-sama to Kagetsuna-kun
- Written by: Naoki Shigeno
- Published by: Leed Publishing
- Magazine: Comic Ran Twins Sengoku Busho Retsuden (2013–2016); Comic Ran Twins (2016–2020)
- Original run: October 26, 2013 – July 14, 2020
- Volumes: 4
- Manga

Sanada Tamashii
- Written by: Naoki Shigeno
- Published by: Hakusensha
- Magazine: Young Animal Densi (2015–2017); Manga Park (2017–present)
- Original run: January 30, 2015 – present
- Volumes: 5
- Anime television series
- Directed by: Akitaro Daichi
- Music by: Toshio Masuda
- Studio: TMS/V1 Studio
- Licensed by: Crunchyroll
- Original network: Tokyo MX, TV Aichi
- Original run: October 4, 2016 – September 29, 2018
- Episodes: 78
- icon

Ninja Girl & Samurai Master, known in Japan as Nobunaga no Shinobi (信長の忍び; lit. 'Nobunaga's Ninja'), is a Japanese four-panel manga series written and illustrated by Naoki Shigeno. It was serialized in Hakusensha's seinen manga magazine Young Animal from June 2008 to July 2025, with its chapters collected in 23 tankōbon volumes. The series is about a fictional shinobi named Chidori who aids the real Japanese general Oda Nobunaga on his journey to the unification of Japan, so that he may bring peace to the land.

The series has spawned various spin-off manga series. An anime television series adaptation directed by Akitaro Daichi and animated by TMS Entertainment was broadcast for three seasons between October 2016 and September 2018, totalling 78 episodes. The series was licensed by Crunchyroll.

== Characters ==
Chidori (千鳥)
Voiced by: Inori Minase
An extremely skilled shinobi that is also very clumsy. She was saved from drowning by Nobunaga as a young girl, and thus wants to serve him with all her strength. She is shown to be so skilled that she is able to easily take on one of the leading male ninjas from Koga who has had years of training (though is defeated through her own idiocy). She is also able to persuade many political leaders to Nobunaga's side.
Oda Nobunaga (織田信長)
Voiced by: Wataru Hatano
The first leading unifier of Japan since the collapse of the old shogunate, who throughout the series works to defeat other daimyos to bring peace to the land. He saved Chidori from drowning when she was young, thus earning her loyalty. He is a very skilled commander, beating out many other daimyos and gaining the support of the Shogun. His three weaknesses, as listed by Chidori, are Oichi (his younger sister), alcohol, and sweets.
Sukezou (助蔵)
Voiced by: Ayumu Murase
Chidori's friend and fellow shinobi. He seems to have a crush on Chidori. His skill is currently unknown, but he is shown to be an inventor of sorts; Chidori uses a smoke bomb designed by him.
Kichou (帰蝶)
Voiced by: Chiaki Takahashi
The wife of Nobunaga. She is very airheaded, and as such Nobunaga doesn't trust her with doing anything. However, he still loves her.
Kinoshita Hideyoshi (木下秀吉)
Voiced by: Kappei Yamaguchi
One of Nobunaga's most trusted generals, though he started out as an errand boy. He seems to be unable to die (getting shot multiple times with arrows, among other things) and is extremely clumsy and dense.
Nene (ねね)
Voiced by: Rie Kugimiya
Hideyoshi's wife, who was friends with him from childhood. She has an extreme Tsundere personality and is terrible at cooking, but loves Hideyoshi very much.
Oichi no kata (お市の方)
Voiced by: Suzuko Mimori
The younger sister of Nobunaga. He loves her very much, listed by Chidori as one of his weaknesses. She is married to Azai Nagamasa, who finds her extremely cute and beautiful, essentially having love at first sight.
Mori Yoshinari (森可成)
Voiced by: Tomokazu Seki
Nobunaga's retainer, a gallant spear fighter.
Honganji Kennyo (本願寺顕如)
Voiced by: Ryotaro Okiayu
The wealthy head of the Ikkō sect.
Nyoshunni (如春尼)
Voiced by: Ayane Sakura
Kennyo's irritable wife.
Mochizuki Chiyome (望月千代女)
Voiced by: Atsumi Tanezaki
Ashikaga Yoshiaki (足利義昭)
Voiced by: Wataru Takagi
Hachisuka Koroku (蜂須賀小六)
Voiced by: Nobuyuki Hiyama
Akechi Mitsuhide (明智光秀)
Voiced by: Shinnosuke Tachibana
Matsudaira Motoyasu (松平元康)
Voiced by: Ryōtarō Okiayu
Matsunaga Hisahide (松永久秀)
Voiced by: Kazuhiko Inoue

== Media ==
=== Manga ===
Written and illustrated by Naoki Shigeno, Nobunaga no Shinobi was serialized in Hakusensha's seinen manga magazine Young Animal from June 13, 2008, to July 25, 2025. Hakusensha collected its chapters in 23 tankōbon volumes, released from June 29, 2009, to October 29, 2025.

==== Spin-offs ====
A spin-off series, titled Nobunaga no Shinobi: Owari Tōitsu-ki (信長の忍び外伝 尾張統一記) was serialized in Young Animal Arashi from November 2, 2012, to May 2, 2017. Hakusensha collected its chapters in three tankōbon, released from August 29, 2014, to July 28, 2017.

A second spin-off series, titled Gunshi Kuroda Kanbee-den (軍師 黒田官兵衛伝), was serialized in Young Animal Densi web magazine from April 26, 2013, to June 30, 2017, and was later transferred to the Manga Park website and app starting on October 3, 2017. The first volume was published on January 29, 2014. As of April 28, 2025, seven volumes have been released.

A third spin-off series, titled Masamune-sama to Kagetsuna-kun (政宗さまと景綱くん), was published in Leed Publishing's Comic Ran Twins Sengoku Busho Retsuden from October 26, 2013, to June 27, 2016. and later in Comic Ran Twins from October 13, 2016, to July 14, 2020. Its chapters were collected in four volumes, released from July 29, 2015, to September 29, 2020.

A fourth spin-off, titled Sanada Tamashii (真田魂), was serialized in Young Animal Densi from January 30, 2015, to June 16, 2017, and was later transferred to the Manga Park website and app starting on August 23, 2017. The first volume was released on April 28, 2016. As of April 28, 2025, five volumes have been released.

=== Anime ===
Preceded by an "Episode 0" screened at the AnimeJapan 2016 event between March 25 and 27, an anime television series adaptation, directed by Akitaro Daichi and animated at TMS Entertainment, aired for twenty-six episodes on TV Aichi and Tokyo MX between October 4, 2016, and March 28, 2017.

A second twenty-six-episode season, titled Ninja Girl & Samurai Master 2nd, known in Japan as, Nobunaga no Shinobi: Ise Kanegasaki-hen (信長の忍び~伊勢・金ヶ崎篇~), aired from April 8 to September 30, 2017.

A third twenty-six-episode season, titled Ninja Girl & Samurai Master 3rd, known in Japan as Nobunaga no Shinobi: Anegawa Ishiyama-hen (信長の忍び~姉川・石山篇~), aired from April 7 to September 29, 2018. (Note: Tokyo MX listed the air dates for the series on Friday at 25:35, which is effectively Saturday at 1:35 a.m. JST.)

The series has been streamed by Crunchyroll.
