= Akitaro Daichi =

Japanese anime director, producer, and photography director

- 大地 丙太郎
- Occupations: Anime director, producer, photography director
- Website: Daichi's homepage

Akitaro Daichi (大地 丙太郎, Daichi Akitarō) is a Japanese anime director, producer and photography director.

== Career ==
Daichi is a native of Gunma Prefecture and a graduate of Tokyo Polytechnic University. He originally aspired to be a stage photographer, but entered the employ of Tokyo Animation Film, an anime photography company. His first work in the industry was as photography director for the Doraemon movie Doraemon: The Records of Nobita, Spaceblazer. After five years, Daichi changed jobs and worked for a video production company making karaoke videos among other things, but he later returned to the anime industry and focused on direction. In 1994, he attracted attention for his storyboard work on Akazukin Chacha, and in 1995 he made his debut as a series director on Nurse Angel Ririka SOS.

=== Sexual harassment allegations ===
In 2018 and 2019, voice actress Hiroko Konishi alleged that she was propositioned by her manager to enter a mixed bath with Daichi in the nude and was blacklisted from the voice acting industry when she refused.

== Works (as director) ==
- Nurse Angel Ririka SOS (1995)
- Elf Princess Rane (1995)
- Kodomo no Omocha (Kodocha; 1996–1998)
- Ojarumaru (1998)
- Sexy Commando Gaiden: Sugoi yo!! Masaru-san (1998)
- Jubei-chan: The Ninja Girl (1999)
- Now and Then, Here and There (1999)
- Carried by the Wind: Tsukikage Ran (2000)
- Fruits Basket (2001)
- Animation Runner Kuromi (2001)
- Atashin'chi (2002)
- Animation Runner Kuromi 2 (2004)
- Makasete Iruka! (Grrl Power!) (2004)
- Jubei-chan: The Ninja Girl 2 (2004)
- Legendz (2004)
- Gag Manga Biyori (2005)
- We Were There (2006)
- Poyopoyo Kansatsu Nikki (2012)
- Kamisama Kiss (2012–2015)
- DD Fist of the North Star (2013)
- Tonkatsu DJ Agetarō (2016)
- Nobunaga no Shinobi (2017)
- Nobunaga no Shinobi: Anegawa Ishiyama-hen (2018)
- Meiji Tokyo Renka (2019)
- Detective Conan: The Culprit Hanzawa (2022)
- Me & Roboco (2022–2023)
- Shin Kochira Katsushika-ku Kameari Kōen Mae Hashutsujo (2027)
