= Jubei-chan: The Ninja Girl =

Japanese anime television series

- Cover from the DVD release of the series

十兵衛ちゃん (Jūbei-chan)
- Created by: Akitaro Daichi, Madhouse
- Anime television series

The Secret of the Lovely Eyepatch
- Directed by: Akitaro Daichi
- Produced by: Kazuhiko Ikeguchi; Masao Maruyama
- Written by: Akitaro Daichi
- Music by: Toshio Masuda
- Studio: Madhouse
- Licensed by: NA: Media Blasters
- Original network: TV Tokyo
- English network: US: Toku
- Original run: April 5, 1999 – June 28, 1999
- Episodes: 13
- Anime television series

The Counter Attack of Siberia Yagyu
- Directed by: Hiroshi Nagahama (chief); Akitaro Daichi
- Produced by: Gō Nakanishi; Masao Morosawa; Shinji Kasai
- Written by: Akitaro Daichi
- Music by: Toshio Masuda
- Studio: Madhouse
- Licensed by: NA: Media Blasters
- Original network: TV Tokyo
- Original run: January 7, 2004 – March 31, 2004
- Episodes: 13
- icon

Jubei-chan: The Ninja Girl (十兵衛ちゃん, Jūbei-chan) is a Japanese anime television series created by Akitaro Daichi (Fruits Basket, Tsukikage Ran). Jubei-chan follows Jiyu Nanohana, a modern junior high school girl and unwilling heir to the Yagyu Jubei school of swordsmanship. The series is recognized for its magical girl stylings, including a mystical artifact, the Lovely Eyepatch, that serves as the source of the heroine's power.

Jubei-chan comprises two television series, which were originally licensed in the U.S. by two companies. The Secret of the Lovely Eyepatch premiered April 5, 1999, and revolves around Jiyu Nanohana coping with her newly entrusted powers and responsibilities and the centuries-old feud between the Yagyu and Ryujoji schools. The Counter Attack of Siberia Yagyu premiered January 7, 2004. The second series introduces Freesia Yagyu, daughter of Yagui Jubei and self-proclaimed heir to the Lovely Eyepatch. The Counter Attack of Siberian Yagyu focuses on Jiyu and Freesia's developing friendship and subsequent rivalry.

The series was broadcast worldwide through Animax. The Secret of the Lovely Eyepatch was licensed in North America by Bandai Entertainment. The rights to The Counter Attack of Siberian Yagyu were held by Geneon Entertainment. Both series were licensed by Media Blasters in 2012. The series premiered on Toku in the United States in January 2016.

== Plot ==
=== The Secret of the Lovely Eyepatch ===
The main conflict in The Secret of the Lovely Eyepatch (ラブリー眼帯の秘密〜, Raburii Gantai no Himitsu) is between the Yagyu Jubei and Ryujoji schools. The rivalry was seemingly ended 300 years before the events of the series, when Yagyu Jubei defeated the Ryujoji school champion. Dying from his wounds, Jubei told his loyal companion Koinosuke to find someone with "plump, bouncy bon bons" and give her his eyepatch, which contained a lifetime's worth of sword techniques. Unknown to Koinosuke, the Ryujoji clan plots their revenge.

After 300 years of searching, Koinosuke finds Jiyu Nanohana in modern Japan. Her figure makes her the ideal candidate to be the next Jubei. He approaches her and tries to give her the eyepatch but she steadfastly refuses. Only when they are attacked by a Ryujoji swordsman does she don the eyepatch and dispose of him. They eventually find out that the Ryujoji clan believes it will be vindicated once the reincarnation of Jubei is defeated.

The introductory episodes follow the "Monster of the Week" formula: in this case, her teachers and peers constantly challenge her. Later episodes delve into her father's pain of losing Jiyu's mother, the sacrifice that Jiyu has to make in order to live a double-life as Jubei, and the Ryujoji Family Curse.

=== The Counter Attack of Siberia Yagyu ===
Like the previous series, the plot of The Counter Attack of Siberian Yagyu (シベリア柳生の逆襲, Siberia Yagyuu no Gyakushuu) begins in Yagyu Jubei's lifetime. The Northern Yagyu were driven out of Japan into Siberia by the Edo Yagyu. After living several years in Siberia, they changed their name to the Siberian Yagyu. The leader of the Edo Yagyu sent Jubei Yagyu to assassinate Kita Ressai, the head of the Siberian clan. Jubei did not wish to carry out the order, but traveled to Siberia anyway. During his time there, he fell in love and had a daughter named Freesia. Some time later he caught up with Kita Ressai, the leader he had been sent to assassinate. Over Jubei's objections, Kita Ressai provoked a duel between the two while on a frozen body of water. In the heat of the battle, Kita Ressai broke through the ice, drowning Jubei Yagyu's wife and daughter along with him. Freesia remained frozen in a glacier for 300 years, until global warming caused enough of the glacier to melt to free her.

Freesia then learns of the Lovely Eyepatch that her father left to his successor. Freesia is furious when she learns that the Lovely Eyepatch was not left to her, but rather Jiyu Nanohana. Determined to claim the Lovely Eyepatch as the daughter of Jubei Yagyu, she tracks down Jiyu Nanohana, intent on defeating Jiyu and making her suffer. At the same time, the Siberian Yagyu learn of the appearance of Jubei Yagyu the Second and track down Jiyu Nanohana in an attempt to satisfy their 300-year-old grudge against Jubei Yagyu.

What ensues is a three way battle between the Siberian Yagyu, Freesia Yagyu and Yagyu Jubei's successor, Jiyu Nanohana. A major theme of the series is power and how differently people react to it. Jiyu does not want the responsibility and she's afraid to lose herself for power while Freesia does not understand anyone who is not willing to have more power.

== Characters ==
Jiyu Nanohana (菜ノ花 自由, Nanohana Jiyū)
Jiyu is a 14-year-old junior high school girl attending a new school at the start of The Secret of the Lovely Eyepatch. She has a bright personality and a close relationship with her father. Her voluptuous figure makes her popular with boys at her school. When she dons the Heart-shaped Eyepatch, she turns into the reincarnation of Yagyu Jubei, the famed swordsman from Japan's feudal era.
The Counter Attack of Siberian Yagyu catches up with her a year later. Even though Jiyu has tried to forget the events of the first series, she still feels guilty over what happened to Koinosuke.
Voiced by: Hiroko Konishi in Series 1, Voiced by: Yui Horie in Series 2, Voiced by: Melanie Risdon (English)
Sai Nanohana (菜ノ花 彩, Nanohana Sai)
Jiyu's father. He is a stay-at-home ghostwriter of historic samurai novels. He cares greatly for his daughter and affectionately nicknames her Jubei. He is often tormented by the memories of his wife, who died at home by Jiyu's side when he used to work in his office. After the incident, he promised to be a better father to Jiyu and subsequently started working at home.
At the time of The Counter Attack of Siberian Yagyu, he is trying to write a novel under his own name at his daughter's request.
Voiced by: Keiji Fujiwara (Japanese); Byron Close (English)
Koinosuke Odago (小田豪 鯉之介, Odagō Koinosuke)
A servant to Yagyu Jubei who walked the Earth for 300 years searching for a worthy successor to his master. Besides the Lovely Eyepatch, he entrusts Jiyu with his master's sword and the "Koinosuke Whistle" that summons him. Though mostly a comedic relief character, Koinosuke is good-hearted and does his best to serve both his old master and his new hosts.
Voiced by: Ryotaro Okiayu (Japanese); Stephen Holgate (Season 1), Roger Rhodes (Season 2) (English)
Freesia Yagyu (柳生フリーシャ, Yagyū Furīsha)
Jiyu's rival during The Counter Attack of Siberian Yagyu. She is Jubei Yagyu's daughter who has spent roughly three hundred years in suspended animation inside a block of ice. She believes that she is the rightful owner of the Lovely Eyepatch and seeks to take it from Jiyu. She intends to make Jiyu suffer as she has suffered. Freesia dons a spade-shaped Eyepatch to transform herself into what she calls the true Jubei Yagyu the Second.
Voiced by: Erina Nakayama (Japanese); Carol-Anne Day (English)
Ayunosuke Odago (小田豪 鮎之介, Odagō Ayunosuke)
Koinosuke's only child, charged with carrying on his task – to give the successor to Jubei Yagyu the Lovely Eyepatch – should he fail. For 300 years, Ayunosuke waited for Koinosuke to return home. Discovering the Lovely Eyepatch that Jiyu had returned to Koinosuke at the end of the first series, Ayunosuke believes that Koinosuke failed and sets out to finish Koinosuke's mission. Unlike Koinosuke, Ayunosuke is a competent ninja and healer, capable of running from Freesia while Freesia is transformed into Jubei Yagyu. Ayunosuke refuses to accept that Jiyu does not want the Lovely Eyepatch and persists in attempting to give it to Jiyu, despite Jiyu's objections.
Voiced by: Ayaka Saito (Japanese); Jasmine Berg (English)
