= A Cold Wind Blows =

A Cold Wind Blows or variants may refer to:

== Music ==
- Cold Wind Blows, album Colwell-Winfield Blues Band 1968
- A Cold Wind Blows, a 1966 UK album and title track composed and sung by Cyril Tawney, Matt McGinn, Johnny Handle and Alasdair Clayre
- "Cold Wind Blows", song by Eminem from Recovery (Eminem album)
- "Where the Cold Wind Blows", Nickel Eye The Time of the Assassins

== Other uses ==
- A Cold Wind Blows (game)
