= Songs to Make You Smile =

Japanese manga

- Cover of the Japanese version

僕が唄うと君は笑うから (Boku ga Utau to Kimi wa Warau kara)
- Genre: Romantic comedy
- Manga
- Written by: Natsuki Takaya
- Published by: Hakusensha
- English publisher: AUS: Madman Entertainment; NA: Tokyopop; SG: Chuang Yi
- Magazine: Hana to Yume; Hana to Yume Planet; Hana to Yume Step
- Original run: January 1993 – June 1998
- Volumes: 1

Songs to Make You Smile (Japanese: 僕が唄うと君は笑うから, Hepburn: Boku ga Utau to Kimi wa Warau kara; Because You Smile When I Sing in Australia and Southeast Asia), is a collection of five short romantic comedy stories written and illustrated by Natsuki Takaya, who also authored the shōjo manga series Fruits Basket. One chapter from the series was published in Hana to Yume on June 20, 1998, and the complete one-volume series was published by Hakusensha on November 19, 1999.

== Plot ==
In "Songs to Make You Smile", quiet, sullen-faced vocalist Atsushi Takahashi prepares for an upcoming performance with his band at his high school festival. He encounters shy Anzu Nakata, who admires his lyrics and defends him from members of another band. Learning that she had been bullied in middle school, he gradually falls in love with her. Late one day at school, he finds her being tormented by members of the other band and fights them, resulting in a cancellation of both performances and a suspension from school for Atsushi. Meeting her at school, he sings a song made just for her, knowing that she had listened to his songs when she was being bullied in middle school, and she smiles with happiness.

"Ding Dong" follows teenage Chisato, whose father died in a traffic accident and who lives with her stepmother. She reflects how her father never gave her Christmas gifts and overhears a conversation between her stepmother and a neighbor in which the neighbor calls her a burden to her stepmother. She eventually realizes that she had been expecting her father to automatically know what she had been wishing for. Her stepmother reveals that her father had felt disconnected from her after his first wife's death, as he had left all the child-raising to her. She then shows her where he had kept all the presents he had wanted to give her.

== Release ==
Natsuki Takaya wrote and illustrated the five stories. In January 1993, "Ding Dong" appeared in a special issue of the manga magazine Hana to Yume Planet. In 1998, "Princess Dark Black" appeared in the 15 January issue of Hana to Yume Step, while "Songs to Make You Smile" first appeared in the fourteenth issue of Hana to Yume. Hakusensha compiled the five stories into a collection and published it on 19 November 1999.

Madman Entertainment licensed the series for English-language translation and distribution in Australia and New Zealand, and released it as Because You Smile When I Sing on 8 October 2008. Chuang Yi published the collection in Singapore. At the 2009 New York Anime Festival convention, Tokyopop announced that it had licensed the series for an English-language translation in North America as Songs and Laughter. It published the collection as Songs to Make You Smile: Stories from the Creator of Fruits Basket on 1 May 2010.

=== Chapter list ===
No.	Original release date	Original ISBN	English release date	English ISBN
1	November 19, 1999	459-217-744-4	October 8, 2008	978-981-276-321-1
1. Songs to Make You Smile (僕が唄うと君は笑うから, Boku ga Utau to Kimi wa Warau kara); 2. Ding Dong; 3. Voice of Mine; 4. Double Flower; 5. Princess Dark Black (暗黒姫, Ankoku Hime)

== Reception ==
Songs to Make You Smile was positively received by English-language readers in North America. It sold an estimated 758 copies, reaching the 132nd place on ICv2's list of the 300 best-selling graphic novels for April 2010.

Johanna Draper Carlsen, a reviewer for Publishers Weekly, had lukewarm feelings towards the collection, writing that the artwork was "stiff" and the stories emotionally overwrought; according to her, the short stories were unlikely to appeal to fans of Fruits Basket, who she thought would be put off by the false feeling of overdone emotions. A French reviewer rated the collection 2 out of 5 stars, finding the art dated and awkward. The reviewer wrote that "Princess Dark Black" was the stand-out story of the collection, with the rest mediocre, and concluded that the collection would appeal to fans of Takaya.
