= Twinkle Stars =

Japanese manga series by Natsuki Takaya

- Cover of the first volume of Twinkle Stars, featuring Sakuya Shiina

星は歌う (Hoshi wa Utau)
- Genre: Drama, romance
- Manga
- Written by: Natsuki Takaya
- Published by: Hakusensha
- English publisher: AUS: Madman Entertainment; NA: Yen Press; SG: Chuang Yi
- Imprint: Hana to Yume Comics
- Magazine: Hana to Yume
- Original run: 5 June 2007 – 20 January 2011
- Volumes: 11

Twinkle Stars (Japanese: 星は歌う, Hepburn: Hoshi wa Utau; lit. "Stars Sing"), also known as Twinkle Stars Like Singing a Song, is a Japanese shōjo manga series written and illustrated by Natsuki Takaya, the author of Fruits Basket. It was serialized by Hakusensha from 5 June 2007 to 20 January 2011 in the manga magazine Hana to Yume, with serial chapters collected in eleven tankōbon volumes under the Hana to Yume Comics imprint. The manga is licensed for an English-language release in North America by Yen Press. An audio drama CD based on the series was released in Japan on 24 February 2010.

== Plot ==
Sakuya Shiina is the president of a star-gazing club at her high school. On her eighteenth birthday, she receives a pink dress from Chihiro, a handsome and mysterious boy around her age who suddenly appears at her birthday party. She initially believes that Chihiro is a friend of Kanade, her guardian, but she later learns that Kanade had invited him to the party thinking that he was her boyfriend. Kanade then becomes offended for being deceived, but Sakuya becomes even more intrigued by Chihiro. She finally gets her chance to meet Chihiro again, and during a discussion about the stars (in which Sakuya says that the star Alphard, the brightest star in the constellation Hydra, is her favorite), Chihiro suddenly exclaims that he hates Sakuya and disappears once again. Sakuya becomes even more troubled when, a few days later, Chihiro suddenly enrolls at her school and becomes a classmate. As the story goes on, Sakuya's feelings towards Chihiro grows, and Chihiro starts warming up to her.

== Characters ==
Sakuya Shiina (椎名 サクヤ, Shiina Sakuya)
Voiced by: Haruka Tomatsu (audio drama)
The heroine of the story. She lives with Kanade in a house close to the sea and works part-time at a shop run by the family of her friend Yuuri. She left her own home because she was receiving no support from her father, and her step-mother was psychologically abusing her. She has always had a fascination with stars and studies them with the encouragement of her teacher. The first chapter begins on the day of her eighteenth birthday when she meets Chihiro. She has two friends: Hijiri Honjou and Yuuri Murakami. After her sudden meeting with Chihiro, she begins to develop romantic feelings towards him.
Chihiro Aoi (葵 千広, Aoi Chihiro)
Voiced by: Takashi Kondō (audio drama)
A mysterious boy who shows up at Sakuya's eighteenth birthday party, even though he was a total stranger both to Sakuya and Kanade, her guardian. As the story progresses, Sakuya falls for him and he warms up to her, despite his own troubling past. It is hinted that Sakuya reminds him of his first love Sakura during his middle school days. As the story progresses, he develops feelings for Sakuya, often showing kind emotions toward her. He has also gotten jealous of Sakuya and Yuuri's close relationship.
Kanade Miyako (宮古 奏, Miyako Kanade)
Voiced by: Hiroki Takahashi (audio drama)
Kanade sheltered Sakuya after she was given up by her father; he and Sakuya are cousins (Sakuya's father is the younger brother of Kanade's mother). He comes from a family where his parents expected him to be perfect. When Kanade eventually reaches his limit regarding this, his parents disown him and he goes to live on his own, taking Sakuya with him at the request of her father. He is an artist (potter) and university student, but has made few friends and is apparently "taking a break", according to Sakuya. He is presented as a lazy and difficult person, making people younger than he is (like Sakuya) work. Sakuya defends this behavior, as she doesn't mind working and because Kanade saved her. Despite this, Sakuya is very important to Kanade, though at first, he found her annoying and a nuisance. After struggling with himself, Kanade decides to get a regular job as a construction worker to show some responsibility towards her.
Yuuri Murakami (村上 優里, Murakami Yūri)
Voiced by: Takuma Terashima (audio drama)
One of Sakuya's best friends. He calls Kanade a "lowlife" because he thinks Kanade takes advantage of Sakuya. Yuuri lives with his older brother Yuuto and their grandmother (his parents are deceased). His family owns a shop in town, where Sakuya works part-time. Yuuri first met Sakuya at the high school opening ceremony and, unintentionally, verbally bullied her about her sad attitude at school. However, after quarreling with his older brother, he came to understand Sakuya's feelings of being abandoned and later apologized to Sakuya, who forgave him and smiled. Yuuri is protective of Sakuya and defends her whenever he catches someone at school tormenting her. He is in love with Sakuya and becomes upset whenever people around him hint that he might have romantic feelings for her. Although he is popular among his classmates, Yuuri is short for his age and is sensitive about height; even so, he excels at sports and often becomes conceited when complimented on his athletic abilities.
Hijiri Honjou (本条 聖, Honjō Hijiri)
Voiced by: Ami Koshimizu (audio drama)
Another one of Sakuya's best friends. Hijiri comes from a wealthy family who seem to own a lot of land in town, including the land where Yuuri's family's shop was built. Hijiri is also very protective of Sakuya. She is very beautiful but has a dark and menacing side. An intimidating person, Hijiri has been referred to as a "wolf in sheep's clothing", and even overwhelms the majority of her teachers. She initially seems to have feelings for Kutani, even after he rejects her confession, but later reconciles that her feelings for Kutani may have developed in response to her belief that Saki would never fall in love with her. When she realizes Saki's feelings for her are genuine, Hijiri begins to reciprocate. Though her name is "Hijiri", she is referred to as "Sei" by Sakuya because the kanji in her name can be alternatively pronounced as such. She is also the president of her class.
Saki (沙己)
Voiced by: Tatsuhisa Suzuki (audio drama)
A long-time servant for the Honjou family who serves as Hijiri's butler. He is completely devoted to Hijiri, though she thinks he is annoying and treats him like a dog. A cheerful and kindhearted young man, Saki is very attuned to Hijiri's moods and behaviors, more so than Hijiri realizes. His devotion to Hijiri and his cheerful nature stems from meeting her when he had been at the lowest point in his life; despite being only a young child, she dragged him all the way to her house and he came to believe that she had given him a second chance at life. His regular declarations of love and gestures of affection to Hijiri are largely met with a violent reaction from her but are entirely sincere, which Hijiri has difficulty accepting.
Shizuka Kutani (久谷 静, Kutani Shizuka)
Sakuya, Chihiro, Hijiri, and Yuuri's homeroom teacher and also a math teacher at the high school. He is the sponsor for the Star-gazing Club and encourages and supports Sakuya. Yuuri calls him "Shizuka-chan" and accuses him of making fun of his height. Kutani also seems to have the habit of losing his contacts and glasses. Apparently, he has a girlfriend.
Yuuto Murakami (村上 優人, Murakami Yūto)
Yuuri's older brother. He is in charge of the family shop where Sakuya works. Yuuto acts more like a parent to Yuuri and still treats him like a child. On Children's Day, he hung up Yuuri's koinobori, even though Yuuri is much too old for such traditions at the age of eighteen. Although he is generally a gentle person, it is hinted that Yuuto used to get into a lot of fights when he was younger.
Sakura Amamiya (天宮 桜, Amamiya Sakura)
Chihiro's first love, a girl he met in middle school who was frequently bullied because she came from a wealthy household. She was treated as an outcast by her classmates. She and Chihiro became close because of their mutual feelings of loneliness, but her fragile emotional state resulted in an attempted suicide by hanging herself. She remains comatose and hospitalized in Tokyo. Sakura eventually awakens and calls Chihiro, resulting in him visiting her.
Yuichi Aoi (葵 悠一, Aoi Yūichi)
Chihiro's uncle, the brother of Chihiro's mother. He took Chihiro in when Chihiro's mother abandoned him. He is a good-hearted man who hopes that by moving away from Tokyo, Chihiro can begin high school with fewer emotional burdens. As a result, Yuichi and his wife worry about Chihiro but are delighted when they learn that Chihiro has friends.

== Media ==
=== Manga ===
Twinkle Stars was written and illustrated by Natsuki Takaya. It was serialized by Hakusensha in the shōjo (aimed at teenage girls) manga magazine Hana to Yume from 5 June 2007 to 20 January 2011. Its sixty-five untitled chapters have been collected in eleven tankōbon volumes in Japan, published by Hakusensha under the Hana to Yume Comics imprint.

The series was originally licensed for an English-language release in Singapore by Chuang Yi; this edition was distributed in Australia and New Zealand by Madman Entertainment. It went out-of-print when Chuang Yi ceased operations in 2014. Yen Press announced they licensed the series for an English-language release in North America in 2015; the company published five omnibus volumes from 2016 to 2018. Twinkle Stars is also licensed in France by Delcourt, in Germany by Carlsen Comics, in Italy by Panini Comics, in Spain by Norma Editorial, in Brazil by Panini Comics, and in Taiwan by Tong Li Publishing.

No.	Original release date	Original ISBN	English (Singapore / Australia, New Zealand / North America) release date	English (Singapore / Australia, New Zealand / North America) ISBN
1	18 January 2008	978-4-592-18601-4	7 September 2009 (SG); 10 January 2011 (AUS/NZ); 22 November 2016 (NA)	978-981-276-939-8 (SG); 978-981-276-940-4 (AUS/NZ); 978-0-316-36023-4 (NA)
Chapters 1–5
2	19 May 2008	978-4-592-18602-1	2 December 2009 (SG); 10 March 2011 (AUS/NZ); 22 November 2016 (NA)	978-981-276-972-5 (SG); 978-981-276-971-8 (AUS/NZ); 978-0-316-36023-4 (NA)
Chapters 6–11
3	19 September 2008	978-4-592-18603-8	6 January 2010 (SG); 10 May 2011 (AUS/NZ); 21 March 2017 (NA)	978-981-276-996-1 (SG); 978-981-276-997-8 (AUS/NZ); 978-0-316-36024-1 (NA)
Chapters 12–17
4	19 January 2009	978-4-592-18604-5	4 May 2010 (SG); 10 July 2011 (AUS/NZ); 21 March 2017 (NA)	978-981-4297-36-3 (SG); 978-981-4297-36-3 (AUS/NZ); 978-0-316-36024-1 (NA)
Chapters 18–23
5	19 May 2009	978-4-592-18605-2	21 December 2010 (SG); 10 September 2011 (AUS/NZ); 1 August 2017 (NA)	978-981-4297-97-4 (SG); 978-981-4297-97-4 (AUS/NZ); 978-0-316-36095-1 (NA)
Chapters 24–29
6	18 September 2009	978-4-592-18606-9	5 September 2011 (SG); 10 November 2011 (AUS/NZ); 1 August 2017 (NA)	978-981-4306-50-8 (SG); 978-981-4306-50-8 (AUS/NZ); 978-0-316-36095-1 (NA)
Chapters 30–35
7	19 January 2010	978-4-592-18607-6	7 February 2012 (SG); 10 March 2012 (AUS/NZ); 7 November 2017 (NA)	978-981-4306-51-5 (SG); 978-981-4306-51-5 (AUS/NZ); 978-0-316-36096-8 (NA)
Chapters 36–41
8	19 May 2010	978-4-592-18608-3	10 May 2012 (AUS/NZ); 7 November 2017 (NA)	978-981-4372-43-5 (AUS/NZ); 978-0-316-36096-8 (NA)
Chapters 42–47
9	17 September 2010	978-4-592-18609-0	10 January 2013 (AUS/NZ); 20 March 2018 (NA)	978-981-4372-55-8 (AUS/NZ); 978-0-316-36098-2 (NA)
Chapters 48–53
10	19 January 2011	978-4-592-18610-6	10 July 2013 (AUS/NZ); 20 March 2018 (NA)	978-981-4372-87-9 (AUS/NZ); 978-0-316-36098-2 (NA)
Chapters 54–59
11	19 April 2011	978-4-592-18037-1	10 November 2013 (AUS/NZ); 20 March 2018 (NA)	978-981-4372-88-6 (AUS/NZ); 978-0-316-36098-2 (NA)
Chapters 60–65

=== Audio drama ===
A Twinkle Stars audio drama CD, produced by Marine Entertainment, was released in Japan on 24 February 2010. The story follows Sakuya and her friends during their last summer vacation together as high school students. It was based on an original scenario written by Takaya.

== Reception ==
In his review of the series for Otaku USA, Che Gilson praised Twinkle Stars as a "solid shojo romantic drama" with "charming girls, cute guys, a good sense of pacing, and pathos." He further praised Takaya's ability to portray her characters' "inner and outer emotional states with art." However, he noted that Twinkle Stars contains "many of the same elements" as Takaya's previous series, Fruits Basket, including "a frustrating penchant for passive heroines."
