= Fruits Basket: Prelude =

2022 Japanese animated film by Yoshihide Ibata

- Theatrical release poster

Japanese name
- Kanji: フルーツバスケット－prelude－
Transcriptions
- Revised Hepburn: Furūtsu Basuketto－Pureryūdo－
- Directed by: Yoshihide Ibata
- Screenplay by: Taku Kishimoto
- Based on: Fruits Basket by Natsuki Takaya
- Starring: Miyuki Sawashiro; Yoshimasa Hosoya; Manaka Iwami; Nobunaga Shimazaki; Yuma Uchida
- Cinematography: Baek Ryun Chae
- Edited by: Aya Hida
- Music by: Masaru Yokoyama
- Production company: TMS Entertainment
- Distributed by: Avex Pictures
- Release date: February 18, 2022
- Running time: 88 minutes
- Country: Japan
- Language: Japanese
- Box office: US$1.12 million

Fruits Basket: Prelude (Japanese: フルーツバスケット－prelude－, Hepburn: Furūtsu Basuketto－Pureryūdo－) is a 2022 Japanese animated film based on Natsuki Takaya's Fruits Basket manga series. Produced by TMS Entertainment and distributed by Avex Pictures, the film consists of a recap of the series' 2019 anime adaptation, a prequel story titled Kyoko and Katsuya's Story that focuses on Tohru Honda's late parents, and an original epilogue story written by Takaya. It stars Miyuki Sawashiro, Yoshimasa Hosoya, Manaka Iwami, Nobunaga Shimazaki and Yuma Uchida.

A new anime focusing on Tohru's late parents was announced at the end of the 2019 anime's finale episode. In October 2021, it was revealed to be part of a compilation film, with the main cast and staff of the 2019 anime returning. Fruits Basket: Prelude premiered in Japan on February 18, and has grossed $1.12 million at the Japanese box office.

== Plot ==
Kyo Sohma has been plagued by guilt since he allowed Kyoko Honda, a woman he had known as a young child, to die in order to avoid exposing his curse. Somehow, against all odds, he met her daughter Tohru, and the two fell in love. But before there was Kyo and Tohru, or even Kyo and Kyoko, there was Kyoko and Katsuya. Kyoko was a troubled teen; Katsuya a student teacher with no actual interest in education. Apart, they were a pair of misfits; together, they made Tohru.

== Voice cast ==
Character	Japanese	English
Kyoko Honda	Miyuki Sawashiro	Lydia Mackay
Katsuya Honda	Yoshimasa Hosoya	J. Michael Tatum
Tohru Honda	Manaka Iwami	Laura Bailey
Kyo Soma	Yuma Uchida; Asuna Tomari (young)	Jerry Jewell; Suzie Yeung (young)
Yuki Soma	Nobunaga Shimazaki	Eric Vale
Shigure Soma	Yuichi Nakamura	John Burgmeier
Momiji Soma	Megumi Han	Mikaela Krantz
Hatsuharu Soma	Makoto Furukawa	Justin Cook
Akito Soma	Maaya Sakamoto	Colleen Clinkenbeard
Saki Hanajima	Satomi Satō	Jad Saxton
Katsuya's Father	Ken Uo	Doug Jackson
Kyoko's Father	Hiroki Maeda	Phil Parsons
Kyoko's Mother	Misa Ishii	Alicyn Packard
Kyo's Mother	Atsuko Yuya	Wendy Powell
Teachers	Ryō Sugisaki; Ken Mizukoshi; Misa Katō	Adam McArthur; Brandon Potter; Marianne Bray
Delinquent	Nao Fujita	TBA
Clerk	Masaki Nakanishi	TBA
Women	Arisa Sakuraba; Azusa Tanaka; Ami Matsushima	TBA
Girls	Kanon Amane; Misaki Watada	TBA
Students	Wataru Katoh; Shinnosuke Tokudome; Yuna Yoshino; Moe Kahara	Dani Chambers; Amanda Gish; Marianne Bray; Emily Ernst

== Production ==
After the airing of the finale episode of the 2019 anime adaptation in June 2021, a new anime that focuses on Tohru's parents, titled Kyо̄ko to Katsuya no Monogatari (今日子と勝也の物語; lit. "The Story of Kyо̄ko and Katsuya"), and a stage play adaptation of the original manga were announced. In October 2021, a compilation film titled Fruits Basket: Prelude was announced, consisting of a recap of the 2019 anime series, the Kyо̄ko to Katsuya no Monogatari anime, and new epilogue scenes written by Natsuki Takaya, the original author. Miyuki Sawashiro, Yoshimasa Hosoya, Manaka Iwami, Nobunaga Shimazaki, and Yuma Uchida were reprising their roles from the 2019 anime. The series' main staff, including Yoshihide Ibata as the director, Taku Kishimoto as the screenwriter, Masaru Shindō as the character designer, Masaru Yokoyama as the composer, and animation studio TMS Entertainment, were also returning for the film. In December 2021, Ohashi Trio was revealed to be performing the film's theme song, titled "Niji to Kite" (虹とカイト; lit. "Rainbow and Kite").

== Marketing ==
The first poster featuring Kyoko and Katsuya was released in October 2021. A teaser trailer and a second poster featuring the Honda family were revealed in December 2021. A second trailer was released in January 2022.

== Release ==
=== Theatrical ===
Fruits Basket: Prelude premiered in 25 theaters in Japan on February 18, 2022. Multiple items were given to moviegoers during different weeks of the film's screening: a 20-page booklet containing a manga adaptation of the film's epilogue story, a replica key frame from the 2019 anime depicting Kyo and Tohru hugging, and postcards drawn by character designer Masaru Shindō.

Golden Harvest premiered the film in Hong Kong on June 9. Crunchyroll acquired the film's distribution rights in the United States, Canada, and the United Kingdom. The company screened the film on June 25, 28, and 29 in the U.S. and Canada, in Japanese and with an English dub, and on July 20 in the UK with only the dub.

=== Home media ===
The film was released on Blu-ray in Japan on June 24, 2022. It included an original eight-page manga written by Takaya. A limited edition Blu-ray was sold in theaters during the film's screening. Crunchyroll began streaming the film on October 6, 2022, with both Japanese and English language options.

== Reception ==
=== Box office ===
Fruits Basket: Prelude grossed $1.12 million in Japan.

In its first four days, the film earned ¥55 million ($479,000) at the Japanese box office. It reached ¥95 million ($826,900) in its second weekend. After 18 days in theaters, the film earned ¥130 million ($1.12 million).

=== Critical response ===
The Japanese review aggregator Filmarks reported that the film received an average rating of 4.24 based on 142 reviews, placing first in its first-day satisfaction ranking.
