= Chuang Yi =

Singapore publishing company

- Native name: 创艺
- Industry: Publishing
- Founded: 1990
- Defunct: 2013
- Headquarters: Bukit Merah, Singapore
- Area served: Singapore, Australia, India, Malaysia, New Zealand, Philippines
- Products: Comics
- Website: ChuangYi.com.sg

Chuang Yi
- Simplified Chinese: 创艺出版社
- Traditional Chinese: 創藝出版社
- Literal meaning: Creative arts publishing house
Transcriptions
Standard Mandarin
- Hanyu Pinyin: Chuàngyì Chūbǎnshè

Chuang Yi Publishing Pte Ltd. (Chinese: 创艺出版社) was a publishing company based in Singapore that specialized in producing domestic and imported comics and comics-related merchandise in English and simplified Chinese. Chuang Yi distributed all or some of its products in Singapore, India, Malaysia and the Philippines. Distribution to Australia and New Zealand occurred through Madman Entertainment and used Australian English translations.

The company is now defunct after ceasing operations in late 2013 and going into liquidation in the following months. Shogakukan Asia formed as the company's successor in regards to its intellectual properties.

== History ==
Chuang Yi Publishing was founded in 1990 as a distributor of Japanese comics published in simplified Chinese. It had early success with Dragon Ball and Slam Dunk, and soon began importing titles from Hong Kong, Taiwan, and South Korea.

In 1995, Chuang Yi set up its first branch office in Kuala Lumpur, Malaysia, and launched two Japanese comic series in Malay. In 1998 and 1999, Chuang Yi published its first TV-drama-to-comic adaptations of Legend of the Eight Immortals and Liang Po Po. Chuang Yi expanded into the English-language market in 2000 with the launch of its Pokémon series, and two Taiwanese comics began serialisation in local newspapers. In 2003, Chuang Yi secured licensing rights to distribute its comics to Australia, New Zealand, and the Philippines, and in 2004 branched into the magazine market including licensing of several Disney titles. Chuang Yi began distribution of sticker collectibles from Panini Comics and Topps UK in 2004 and 2005, and in 2006 began distribution of comics in India. In 2007, the company secured the rights to develop stationery merchandise for Pokémon and Disney products, and began exclusive distribution of DC Comics and Marvel Comics products to Singapore and Malaysia.

Chuang Yi ceased operations in late 2013 and went into liquidation in the following months. Shogakukan Asia purchased the company's intellectual properties and acts as its successor in that capacity.

== Manga published in Chinese ==
- 20th Century Boys (20世纪少年)
- 21st Century Boys (21世纪少年)
- Absolute Boyfriend (绝对男友)
- Air Gear
- Blaue Rosen (摇滚下的蓝色蔷薇)
- Bleach (死神)
- Bloody Monday
- D.Gray-Man
- Death Note (死亡笔记)
- Detective Conan (名侦探柯南)
- Doraemon (哆啦A梦)
- Dragon Ball (七龙珠)
- Eyeshield 21
- Fairy Tail
- Fruits Basket (水果篮子)
- Fullmetal Alchemist (钢之炼金术师)
- Flame of Recca (烈火之炎)
- Fushigi Yuugi Genbu Kaiden
- GetBackers
- Hayate the Combat Butler (疾风守护者)
- Hikaru no Go (棋灵王)
- Katekyo Hitman Reborn (家庭教师HITMAN REBORN!)
- Kekkaishi (结界师)
- Kindaichi Case Files (金田一少年之事件簿)
- Konjiki no Gash!! (魔童小子)
- Initial D (头文字D)
- Love Celeb (情迷贵公子)
- MÄR
- MÄR Omega
- Melancholic Princess (傾國怨伶)
- Monster Soul
- Naruto (火影忍者)
- NANA
- Negima!: Magister Negi Magi (魔法老师)
- Ninkuu (忍空)
- Ninkuu SECOND STAGE
- One Piece
- Ouran High Host Club (Ouran High School Host Club in North America, Ōran Kōkō Hosuto Kurabu in Japan)
- Placebo
- Prince of Tennis (网球王子)
- PSYCHO BUSTERS (超能力少年)
- Saint Seiya EPISODE G (圣斗士星矢 EPISODE.G)
- Samurai Deeper Kyo (鬼眼狂刀 Kyo)
- Special A
- Shaman King (通灵童子)
- SS: Racer's Special (SS：赛车手特别篇)
- Tactics
- The Gentlemen's Alliance
- The King of Blaze (火王)
- To Love-Ru (To Love恋爱大麻烦)
- Tsubasa: Reservoir Chronicle (TSUBASA翼)
- Vampire Knight (吸血鬼士)
- M×0
- W-change
- xxxHolic (迷梦魔法屋 XXX HOLIC)
- Yankee-kun to Megane-chan (不良少年与四眼妹)

== Manga published in English ==
- .hack//Legend of the Twilight
- Absolute Boyfriend ("Zettai Kareshi")
- Astro Boy (Akira Himekawa's series)
- Ballad of a Shinigami
- Battle B-Daman
- Beyblade
- Blaue Rosen (Japanese title: Ai wo Utau yori Ore ni Oborero)
- Bakegyamon
- Because You Smile when I Sing
- Bio Booster Armor Guyver
- Bloody Monday
- Boys Esté
- Captive Hearts
- Chrono Crusade
- Crush Gear Turbo
- Digimon
- Doraemon (bilingual)
- Fairy Cube
- FIGHT! Crush Gear Turbo
- Flunk Punk Rumble (Yankee-kun to Megane-chan)
- Fruits Basket
- Fullmetal Alchemist
- Full Metal Panic! Sigma
- Fushigi Yûgi (Including Fushigi Yûgi Genbu Kaiden)
- Fushigiboshi no Futagohime (Twin Princesses of the Wonder Planet)
- Girls Bravo
- Gundam
  - Gundam Seed
- Hamtaro Handbook
- Hellsing
- Hoshi wa Utau
- Imadoki!
- Kingdom Hearts
- Kingdom Hearts: Chain of Memories
- Kingdom Hearts II
- La Corda D'Oro
- Land of the Blindfolded
- Love Hina
- Maburaho
- MÄR
- Medabots
- Metal Fight Beyblade
- Midori Days
- Mirmo!
- Mon Colle Knights
- Monochrome Factor
- My-HiME
- My Fair Lady known in North America as The Wallflower and Yamato nadeshiko Shichihenge in Japan
- Negima! Magister Negi Magi
- Neon Genesis Evangelion
- Otomen
- Ouran High School Host Club
- Over Rev!
- Phantom Dream
- Pokémon
  - Pokémon: The Electric Tale of Pikachu
  - Pokémon Adventures
  - Magical Pokémon Journey
  - Ash & Pikachu
  - Phantom Thief Pokémon 7
  - Pokémon Gold & Silver The Golden Boys
  - Pokémon Pocket Monsters
    - Pokémon Ruby-Sapphire
  - Pokémon Jirachi Wish Maker
  - Pokémon Destiny Deoxys
  - Pokémon: Lucario and the Mystery of Mew
  - Pokémon Ranger and the Temple of the Sea
  - Pokémon Battle Frontier
  - Pokémon Diamond and Pearl Adventure!
- Placebo
- RahXephon
- S · A: Special A
- Saiyuki Reload
- Slam Dunk
- Solar Boy Django
- Speed Grapher
- Spriggan
- SuperPsychic Nanaki (Chōshinri Genshō Nōryokusha Nanaki)
- SS: Special Stage
- Tactics
- Tenchi Muyo!
- There, Beyond The Beyond (Sono Mukou-no Mukougawa)
- The Girl Who Leapt Through Time
- The Melancholy of Haruhi Suzumiya
- The Mythical Detective Loki
- The Mythical Detective Loki Ragnarok
- Tokyo Mew Mew
- Trinity Blood
- Trigun
- Tsubasa: Reservoir Chronicle
- Tsubasa: Those with Wings
- Vagabond
- Vampire Knight
- Venus in Love
- Wangan Midnight
  - Wangan Midnight: C1 Runner
- Wild Adapter
- Wings of Desire
- World Embryo
- X
- Young Guns
- Super Yo-Yo
- Zatch Bell! (Konjiki no Gash!!)
- Zig Zag
- Zoids

=== Other comic magazines published in English ===
After 2004, Chuang Yi published magazines based licensed franchises, accompanied by themed real-world events, graphic novels, sticker books, and other merchandise. The magazine contents were Singapore-specific. The franchises include:

- Disney Princess
- Disney Fairies
- Winx Club (up to issue #39; MediaCorp has handled Winx from No. 40 onwards)
- W.I.T.C.H.

In the past they also produced Winnie-the-Pooh and Monster Allergy franchise magazines. Chuang Yi also distributed two imported magazines from Australia: Bratz from Otter Press, and Krash from Nuclear Media and Publishing. It also held licenses to produce and distribute a variety of stationery products, children's toys, keychains, and stickers for the Pokémon and Looney Tunes franchises.

== Manhwa published in English ==
- Ragnarok: Into The Abyss

== See also ==
- Shogakukan Asia
