= Jerry Jewell =

American voice actor

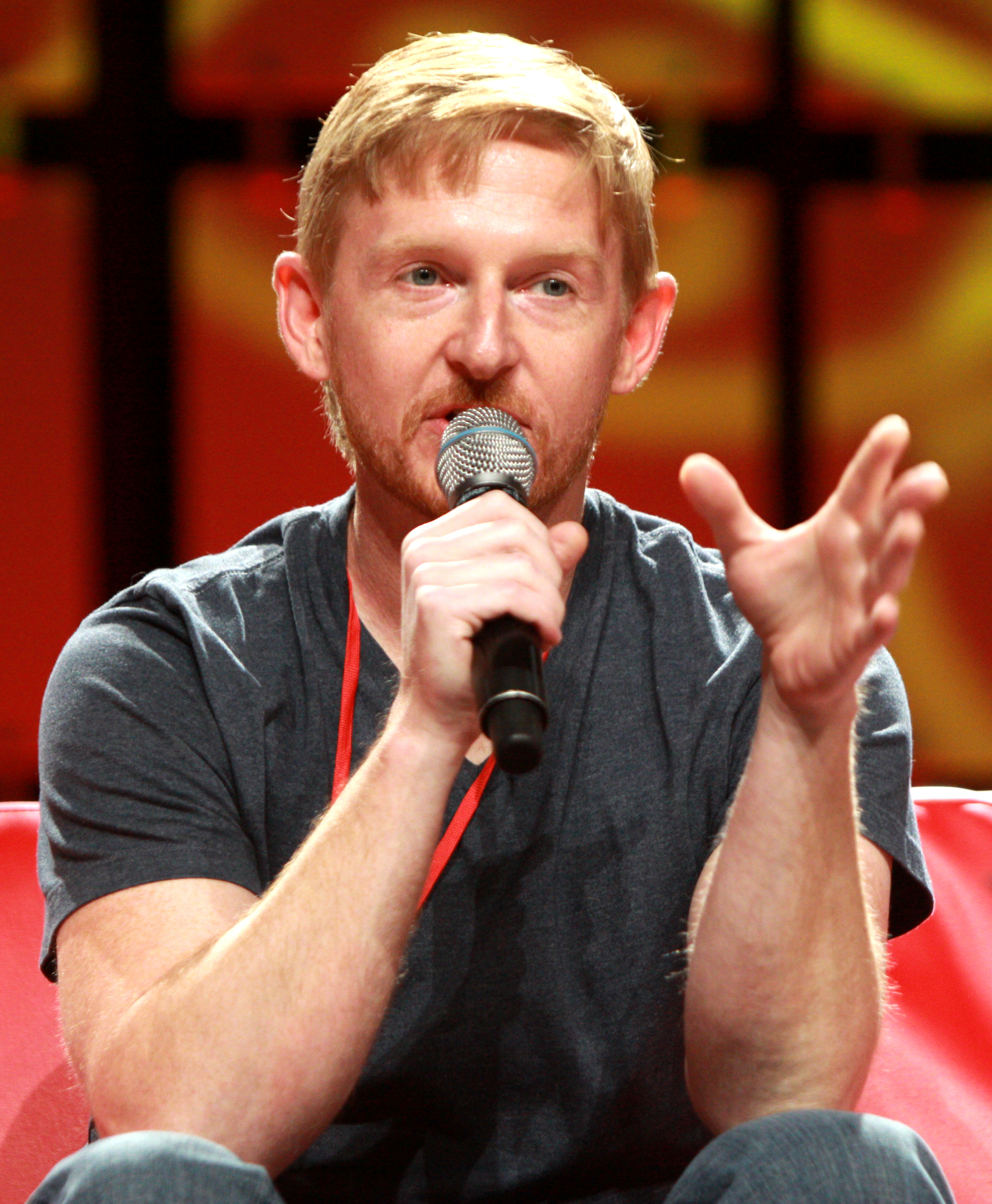
- Jewell in 2013
- Occupations: Voice actor; voice director
- Children: 1

Jerry Dean Jewell is an American voice actor and voice director. He has performed the voices for several anime roles and is noted for his roles as: Kyo Sohma in the Fruits Basket series, ace detective Jimmy Kudo in Case Closed, Caesar Clown in One Piece, Barry the Chopper in the Fullmetal Alchemist series, Russia in Hetalia, Principal Nezu in My Hero Academia, Lyon Vastia in Fairy Tail, Viktor Nikiforov in Yuri!! on Ice, Yuma Isogai in Assassination Classroom, Kusuo Saiki in The Disastrous Life of Saiki K. and Natsuno Yuki in Shiki.

== Filmography ==
=== Anime ===
List of dubbing performances and production work in anime
Year	Title	Role	Crew role, Notes
2001	Dragon Ball	Nam, Sky Dragon	Funimation dub
2002	Lupin III: The Secret of Twilight Gemini	Sadachiyo	
2002	Fruits Basket	Kyo Sohma	
2002–06	YuYu Hakusho	Jin, Sakamoto, Suzaku, others	Theme song performance (End 4)
2003	Blue Gender	Tony Frost	
2003	Dragon Ball Z	Nam	Funimation dub
2003	Dragon Ball GT	Doma, Quarterbot, Eis Shenron	Eps. 7-8, Ep. 3
2004–05	AM Driver	Taft Krema	
2004–09	Case Closed series	Jimmy Kudo, Phantom Thief Kid	
2004	Fullmetal Alchemist	Barry the Chopper	
2004	Kiddy Grade	Max	
2005	Baki the Grappler	Kikuchi	Ep. 48
2005	Desert Punk		Theme song performance ED1
2005	Kodocha	Akito Hayama	
2006–10	Tsubasa: Reservoir Chronicle	Sorata Arisugawa	Also OVA "Tokyo Revelations"
2006	Samurai 7	Hyogo	
2006	Trinity Blood	Memlink (Count of Antwerp)	
2006	Spiral		
2006	Black Cat	Lin Xiao Li	
2006	Speed Grapher	Takahata	Ep. 9
2006	Shin-chan	Happiness Bunny	Funimation dub
2004	BECK: Mongolian Chop Squad	Yoshiyuki Taira	
2007	Peach Girl	Hyoma	Ep. 12
2007	School Rumble		
2008	Shuffle!	Rin Tsuchimi	
2008	xxxHolic	Shop Keeper	Ep. 6
2008	Kenichi: The Mightiest Disciple	Ryuto "Odin" Asamiya	
2008	Shakugan no Shana Final	Barma, Gizo	ADR Director, Line Producer
2008	Darker than Black	Eelis Kastinen	Eps. 13-14
2008-09	Linebarrels of Iron	Makoto Domyoji	
2008-09	Ouran High School Host Club	Arai	Ep. 15-16
2008	School Rumble: 2nd Semester	Nihil	Ep. 21
2008	Big Windup!	Hironori Okawa	
2009	Baccano!	Claire Stanfield	
2009-10	D.Gray-man	Goz, Klack	
2009	Black Blood Brothers	Zelman Clock	
2009	Sgt. Frog	Viper	Eps. 74, 78
2009	Gunslinger Girl -Il Teatrino	Pinocchio	
2009	Birdy the Mighty Decode	Lailalo	
2009	Dragonaut - The Resonance	Ashim Jamal	
2009	Kaze no Stigma	Shin	
2009	Initial D: Fourth Stage	Spectator	Ep. 4
2009	The Tower of Druaga: the Aegis of Uruk	Dirk	
2010	Fullmetal Alchemist: Brotherhood	Barry the Chopper	
2010	Soul Eater	Clown	Ep. 43
2010	The Legend of the Legendary Heroes	Lucile Eris	
2010	Shiki	Natsuno Yuki	
2010	Claymore	Lig, Pario, Stranger	Eps. 3-6
2010-21	Hetalia: Axis Powers series	Russia	
2010	Bamboo Blade	Schoolboy A	Ep. 5
2010	Sekirei series	Izumi Higa	
2010-11	Casshern Sins	Dio	
2010	Corpse Princess	Hizuchi (Seven Stars)	
2010	Dance in the Vampire Bund	Jean Marais Deramille	
2010	Dragon Ball Z Kai	Malaka	Ep. 19, Theme song performance "Live Your Life! Don't Stop Until It's Done" (ED)
2010	Eden of the East	Ryo Yuki	
2010	Phantom ~Requiem for the Phantom~	Xu	
2010	Sands of Destruction	Jade	Ep. 4
2010	Strike Witches	Kurt Flachfeld	Ep. 8
2011-17	Black Butler series	Lau	
2011	Chrome Shelled Regios	Kalian Loss	
2011-19	Fairy Tail	Lyon Vastia	
2011	Rosario + Vampire series	The Bat	
2011	Blood-C		ADR Director, Line Producer
2011	Fractale	Doctor	Ep. 3
2011	We Without Wings	Platinum, Hein	ADR Director
2012	Ōkami-san and her Seven Companions	Saburo "Neko" Nekomiya	
2012	Last Exile: Fam, the Silver Wing	Crèche	4 episodes
2012	Panty & Stocking with Garterbelt	Cop	Ep. 8A
2012	Is This a Zombie? Of the Dead		ADR Director
2012	A Certain Magical Index II	Koyagi, Ushibuka	ADR Director
2012	Deadman Wonderland	Keigo Ugachi	OVA
2012	C - Control - The Money and Soul of Possibliity	God	Ep. 11
2012	Tenchi Muyo! War on Geminar	Cliff Cleese	
2013	Toriko	Bogie Woods	ADR Director Eps. 37-50
2013	Good Luck Girl!	Shogo Utsumi	
2013-15	Kamisama Kiss		ADR Director
2013	Aesthetica of a Rogue Hero	Kyouya Hikami	
2013–14	Haganai series	Kodaka Hasegawa, Taka (Sora's friend)	
2013	Michiko & Hatchin	Vasily Nabokov	Eps. 5-6
2013-14	Tokyo Ravens	Shaver	
2014	Karneval	Azana	
2014	Code:Breaker	Yuki Tenpoin	
2014	A Certain Scientific Railgun S	Kikuhiko Kojun	ADR Director
2014	Free! Eternal Summer	Momotaro Mikoshiba	ADR Director
2014	Senran Kagura		ADR Director
2014-19	Attack on Titan	Moblit Berner	also Attack on Titan: Junior High
2014	Space Dandy	Dumdee	Ep. 22
2014	Daimidaler the Sound Robot	Jake	
2014-20	One Piece	Merry, Minchy, Hildon, Caesar Clown	Funimation dub, ADR Director Eps. 313-324
2015-16	Assassination Classroom	Yuma Isogai	also Koro-sensei Q!
2015	Yona of the Dawn	Ik-su	Eps. 6-9, 24
2015	Maria the Virgin Witch	Priapos	
2015	D-Frag!	Shikiba, Narrator	
2015	High School DxD BorN	Ajuka Beelzebub	
2015	Blood Blockade Battlefront	Tonio	Ep. 4
2015	Seraph of the End	Shinya Hīragi	
2015	Show by Rock!! series	Aion	
2015	Gangsta.	Gawain	Ep. 5
2015	The Heroic Legend of Arslan	Gieve	
2015	World Break: Aria of Curse for a Holy Swordsman	Darko	
2016	Prince of Stride: Alternative	Yū Kamoda	
2016	Divine Gate	Johann	
2016	Dimension W	Keebo	Ep. 4
2016	Brothers Conflict	Louis Asahina	
2016	Gonna be the Twin-Tail!!	Snakeguildy	
2016-25	My Hero Academia	Nezu	
2016-2017	Puzzle & Dragons X	Jest	
2016	D.Gray-man: Hallow	Nea D. Campbell	
2016	The Disastrous Life of Saiki K.	Kusuo Saiki	Funimation Dub
2016	Orange		ADR Director
2016	Yuri!!! on Ice	Victor Nikiforov	
2016	Tōken Ranbu: Hanamaru	Uguisumaru	
2016-17	Trickster	Tomohisa Ōtomo	
2016	Drifters	Shara	
2016-17	All Out!!	Mitsuo Hanadate	
2016	Rampo Kitan: Game of Laplace	Corpsey	ADR Director
2016	Servamp	Snow Lily/All of Love	
2016	The Vision of Escaflowne	Pyle	Funimation dub
2017	ACCA: 13-Territory Inspection Dept.	Lilium's Older Brother	Ep. 4
2017	Hand Shakers		ADR Director
2017	Love Tyrant	Seiji's Father	ADR Director
2017	Sakura Quest	Sandal	
2017	Knight's & Magic	Olver Blomdahl	
2017	Hyōka	Muneyoshi Kugayama	
2017	In Another World With My Smartphone	Sango	Eps. 10-12
2017	Chronos Ruler	Victo Putin	ADR Director
2017	Jūni Taisen: Zodiac War	Usagi/Rabbit	
2017	Code: Realize − Guardian of Rebirth		ADR Director
2017-21	Black Clover	Licht/Patolli	William Vangeance in Episode 53
2017	Blood Blockade Battlefront & Beyond	Lee Godot	Eps. 8-9
2017	Star Blazers: Space Battleship Yamato 2199		ADR Director
2017	Myriad Colors Phantom World		ADR Director
2017	Hundred		ADR Director
2018	Karakai Jozu no Takagi	Kimura	season 1
2018	Pop Team Epic	Pipimi	Ep. 9B
2018	Basilisk: The Ōka Ninja Scrolls	Gorone Negoro	
2019-21	Fruits Basket (2019 TV series)	Kyo Sohma	
2019	Afterlost	Yoshiaki	
2019	Ensemble Stars!	Makoto Yuuki	
2019	Dr. Stone	Hyoga	ADR Director Eps. 70-94
2019	Plunderer	David	
2021	Heaven Official's Blessing		ADR Director
2022	Arifureta: From Commonplace to World's Strongest Season 2	Bize	
2022	Remake Our Life!	Kyoya Hashiba	
2022	Sing "Yesterday" for Me	Kinoshita	
2022	I'm the Villainess, So I'm Taming the Final Boss	Ruck	
2022	The Girl from the Other Side: Siúil, a Rún	Hunter	
2023	Mobile Suit Gundam: The Witch from Mercury	Haro	
2026	Daemons of the Shadow Realm	Jin Kagemori	

=== Film ===
List of voice performances and production work in direct-to-video and feature films
Year	Title	Role	Crew role, Notes	Source
2009	Case Closed: Captured in Her Eyes	Jimmy Kudo		
2010	Case Closed: Countdown to Heaven	Jimmy Kudo		
2007	Case Closed: The Fourteenth Target	Jimmy Kudo		
2009	Case Closed: The Last Wizard of the Century	Jimmy Kudo, Phantom Thief Kid		
2010	Case Closed: The Phantom of Baker Street	Jimmy Kudo		
2006	Case Closed: The Time Bombed Skyscraper	Jimmy Kudo		
2009-10	Eden of the East films	Ryo Yuki		
2018	Free! Take Your Marks	Momotaro Mikoshiba		
2022	Fruits Basket: Prelude	Kyo Sohma		
2006	Fullmetal Alchemist: Conqueror of Shamballa	Barry the Chopper		
2012	Mass Effect: Paragon Lost	Additional Voices		
2009-16	Rebuild of Evangelion series	Kaworu Nagisa		
2008	Vexille 2077 Isolation of Japan	Informant		

=== Video games ===
List of voice performances and production work in video games
Year	Title	Role	Crew role, Notes	Source
2005	Aeon Flux	Soldiers		
2007	Dragon Ball Z: Budokai Tenkaichi 3	Nam		
2007	Case Closed: The Mirapolis Investigation	Jimmy Kudo		
2008	Dragon Ball: Origins	Nam		
2015	Dragon Ball Xenoverse	Eis Shenron		
2016	Dragon Ball Xenoverse 2	Eis Shenron		
2019	Borderlands 3	Wanderer		
2020	Dragon Ball Z: Kakarot	Nam		
2021	Dragon Ball Legends	Eis Shenron		
