= Liselotte & Witch's Forest =

Japanese manga series by Natsuki Takaya

- Volume 1 cover, featuring Liselotte

リーゼロッテと魔女の森 (Rīzerotte to Majo no Mori)
- Genre: Fantasy, romance
- Manga
- Written by: Natsuki Takaya
- Published by: Hakusensha
- English publisher: NA: Yen Press
- Magazine: Hana to Yume
- Original run: May 20, 2011 – December 2013 (indefinite hiatus)
- Volumes: 5

Liselotte & Witch's Forest (リーゼロッテと魔女の森, Rīzerotte to Majo no Mori) is a Japanese fantasy romance shōjo manga series written and illustrated by Natsuki Takaya. The series has been on hiatus since December 2013.

== Plot ==
Liselotte is an exiled noble woman who, despite her status, is completely incompetent at handling things independently. With her twin servants, Alto and Anna, by her side, she begins to start her new life moving in to her new house next to a mystical forest said to be filled with witches. While there, Liselotte encounters a stranger named Engetsu whose past is shrouded in mystery.

== Release ==
Natsuki Takaya launched the series in the twelfth issue of Hana to Yume on May 20, 2011. The series went on hiatus in December 2013 to allow the author to recover from an illness. Takaya announced in July 2015 that she had no immediate plans to relaunch the series, but would "try hard to resume her work little by little".

In December 2015, Yen Press announced that it had licensed the series. The first volume was released on July 26, 2016, with a new volume coming out every three months.

=== Volumes ===
No.	Original release date	Original ISBN	English release date	English ISBN
1	April 20, 2012	978-4-592-19461-3	July 26, 2016	978-0-316-36019-7
2	April 20, 2012	978-4-592-19462-0	October 25, 2016	978-0-316-36022-7
3	November 20, 2012	978-4-592-19463-7	January 24, 2017	978-0-316-36103-3
4	May 20, 2013	978-4-592-19464-4	April 18, 2017	978-0-316-36104-0
5	November 20, 2013	978-4-592-19465-1	July 18, 2017	978-0-316-36105-7

== Reception ==
Volume 1 reached the 24th place on the weekly Oricon manga chart and, as of April 29, 2012, has sold 63,073 copies; volume 2 reached the 27th place and, as of April 22, 2012, has sold 30,364 copies; volume 3 also reached the 27th place and, as of November 25, 2012, has sold 47,087 copies; volume 4 reached the 29th place and, as of May 25, 2013, has sold 45,132 copies; volume 5 reached the 22nd place and, as of November 24, 2013, has sold 32,104 copies.
