= Fruit Basket Turnover =

Children's game

Fruit Basket Turnover or Fruit Basket Upset, also known as Fruit Salad, Fruit Bowl, Fruits Basket [sic] and others is a children's game.

Fruit Basket usually refers to a variation in which each fruit is ostensibly associated with only one player, and the player in the centre must call two fruit names.

== Rules ==
The game is played as follows:

- The players are divided into equal-sized groups, with each group having the name of a fruit.
- A circle is formed with a number of chairs equal to one less than the number of players. The players sit on the chairs, ensuring that members of each group are evenly distributed around the circle.
- One player will be left without a chair, and will stand in the centre of the circle.
- The player standing in the centre calls out one of the fruit names. When this happens, all players in that group must stand up from their seats and move to another seat in the circle. The player in the centre must attempt to take one of the free seats while the other players are moving.
- A new player will then be left in the centre, enabling the game to be repeated. If any player failed to move even though their group's fruit name was called, they are required to move into the centre and the player previously in the centre sits in their seat.
- Instead of stating a fruit name, the player in the centre may call "Fruit Basket Turnover!", "Fruit Basket Upset!" or "Fruits Basket!", in which case everybody must move to a different seat.
- There is often a restriction that the player must move to a seat not adjacent to their own.

In some variants of the game, a player can be eliminated from the game, usually if they either fail to move when their fruit name is called, or are due to appear in the centre for two rounds in a row. Whenever a player is eliminated, a chair is also removed from the circle. The game resembles a combination of the games Musical chairs and Duck Duck Goose.

In an outdoor version of the game, the players stand along the side of a large open area, and must run from one side to the other without being tagged when their fruit, or 'turnover', is called. Any player who is caught by the player in the middle must join the player in the middle to help catch players on future moves. Eventually, all players are caught.

== References to the game ==
The most well-known reference in youth culture to Fruits Basket is the manga and anime series of the same name, where it is used as a metaphor for ability to integrate with a social group. In that series, the protagonist Tohru Honda describes that whenever she played the game in school, she was assigned the name "onigiri" (rice ball). Although she was fine with this, she later realized that the other children playing never called this name because an onigiri is not a fruit and didn't belong in a fruit basket, thus leaving her sitting as they continued to play. However, at the end of episode 5, when she is accepted into the Sohma family, we see one child call "onigiri!" and, smiling, Tohru joins in the game. The series title itself originates from the fact that Tohru previously thought that she could never actually fit in with the Sohma family, just as a rice ball could never belong in a fruit basket, but, being accepted into the family proves otherwise, and she learns that she has a home with them.

The anime Mitsudomoe makes reference to the game in episode 1 of season 1 but is portrayed in a violent yet humorous way.

== See also ==
- A Cold Wind Blows, almost exactly the same game by a different name.
- Never have I ever
