= Zig Zag (manga) =

Japanese manga series

- Cover of the first volume of the manga Zig Zag by Yuki Nakaji, as published by Hakusensha in 2005

ジグ ザグ (Jigu Zagu)
- Genre: Romance, Comedy, Drama
- Manga
- Written by: Yuki Nakaji
- Published by: Hakusensha
- English publisher: NA: Tokyopop; SG: Chuang Yi
- Magazine: LaLa
- Original run: November 2004 – November 2008
- Volumes: 9

Zig Zag is a Japanese shōjo manga written and illustrated by Yuki Nakaji.

The series revolves around the lives of a group of students living in Kazami Dormitory of Seifu Private School in Japan. It mainly focuses on a boy named Takaaki Asakura (nicknamed "Taiyou" (the sun) for his sunny and cheerful disposition) and his affection for flowers.

The series was serialized in LaLa and the collected volumes are published under the Hana to Yume Comics imprint. The series is also published in English by Chuang Yi in Singapore and by Tokyopop in North America.

== Characters ==
- Takaaki Asakura a.k.a. "Taiyou" (Japanese for 'sun')

Taiyou is a cheerful boy who transfers into the all-male Kazami Dormitory of Seifu Private School after his parents move away to Naha, Okinawa for a job posting. His pretty and gentle features often mislead other boys into initially believing he is a girl, something used as a constant source of humour in the series. His outgoing personality and cheerful disposition allows him to make friends easily in the dorm and he soon becomes the favourite "pet" of dorm supervisor, Jin Kanbara. He has a vibrant love for flowers and floral arrangements, and has a healthy sense of respect for people skilled in this art. He has a childhood crush on his older cousin (actual relation unknown) Marika, who helped develop his interest in flowers. Taiyou shares a room with the initially taciturn and introverted Sono Kihihara, and plays a key role in setting up a school club devoted to flowers called the Bee Bee Company. He also works part-time at a flower store called Atelier Hinata, run by Hinata Suwa.

- Sono Kirihara a.k.a. "Black Kirihara"

Sono is Taiyou's roommate at Kazami Dormitory. The son of a famous Japanese ikebana (floral arrangement) master, Sono is at the dorm after leaving home following a quarrel with his father over what he believes are his father's strict rules about floral art. Initially unapproachable and moody, he soon warms up to Taiyou's incessant cheerfulness and the two become friends. Taiyou admires Sono's knowledge of flowers and persuades him to join the Bee Bee Company. Sono also works at Atelier Hinata. Taiyou coined the name "Black Kirihara" after mistaking Sono's younger brother for him, noting their opposing personalities.

- Tatsuki Suwa

Suwa is Taiyou's best friend from grade school and incidentally also a resident at Kazami Dorm. A sporty, athletic type, he is often found hanging around Taiyou and mooching off him. Suwa has a crush on a girl at Seifu named Mei Odagiri. Suwa becomes part of the Bee Bee Company for reasons of his own. He is the younger brother of Atelier Hinata's owner, though his interest in flowers is passing, at best.

- Jin Kanbara a.k.a. Jin-Jin

Jin Kanbara is a second-year student and the dorm supervisor in charge of Taiyou and the rest. A mischievous character, he takes an instant liking to Taiyou and tends to tease the boy physically. He often comes up with strange schemes that gets the rest of the residents at Kazami Dormitory involved. He is the cousin of Saho Kenbuchi. He may also have a crush on Saho.

- Yuki Kirihara a.k.a. "White Kirihara"

Yuki is Sono's younger brother, though the two are physically very similar. This physical resemblance initially confuses Taiyou into believe they are one and the same, except for the difference in their personalities (Yuki is initially thoughtful and kind), leading him to call Yuki "White Kirihara". Yuki remains at home with his and Sono's parents and continues to train under their father in the art of ikebana.

- Hinata Suwa

Hinata is Tatsuki's older brother and owner of a flower shop called Atelier Hinata. Though skilled at floral arrangements, he has little business experience and his business suffered until Taiyou and Sono started to work there and brought in the crowds. He is a fan of Sono's father's work.

- Mei Odagiri

Mei is a student at Seifu who secretly has a crush on Sono. At the same time, Tatsuki is interested in her, and repeatedly makes that apparent, though she has constantly refused his advances, not that it stops him. She appears to be a shy, quiet type.

- Saho Kenbuchi

An athletic girl who is best friends with Mei, and who constantly beats up on Tatsuki to deter his advances on her (Mei). She is on the school's lacrosse team and over time, becomes interested in Taiyou. On a recent trip with the gang to Okinawa, Tatsuki introduces Saho to Taiyou's parents as his (Taiyou) girlfriend.
