= Fruits Basket Another =

Japanese manga series

- Cover of the first volume, featuring Sawa Mitoma

フルーツバスケットanother (Furūtsu Basuketto Anazā)
- Genre: Comedy, drama
- Manga
- Written by: Natsuki Takaya
- Published by: Hakusensha
- English publisher: NA: Yen Press
- Magazine: HanaLaLa Online; (2015–2017); Manga Park; (2017–2020)
- Original run: September 4, 2015 – April 20, 2020
- Volumes: 4

Fruits Basket Another (Japanese: フルーツバスケットanother, Hepburn: Furūtsu Basuketto Anazā) is a Japanese manga series written and illustrated by Natsuki Takaya; it serves as a sequel to Takaya's previous work Fruits Basket. It was serialized on the HanaLaLa Online manga website from September 2015 to August 2017 and on the Manga Park website from August 2017 to April 2020. The series' individual chapters were collected into four volumes.

The sequel was originally created by Takaya to promote the main series' collector's edition and did not feature the main cast from the main series. Critical reception was mixed with many critics offering praise for the artwork and characters, while criticizing the story.

== Plot ==
Taking place decades after the events in the original publication, the story includes "the next generation" of the Sohma family. The story begins with Sawa Mitoma, a very shy and self-conscious girl, who avoids others, not wanting to bother anyone. When she begins her first year of high school at Kaibara Municipal High School, she instantly gets in trouble with a teacher, but she is saved by the "princely" Mutsuki Sohma. After, Mutsuki asks Sawa to go to the student council room after school. There she meets Hajime Sohma, another member of the Sohma family by accidentally stepping on his face.

The next day, she meets with both Hajime and Mutsuki again, who both help her deal with her landlord. Sawa starts crying in front of them because she feels like a burden. But, after both boys console her, Sawa asks to make up for injuring Hajime the day before. Mutsuki decides to make her a part of the student council. While Sawa is at first reluctant, she agrees to join so she can improve herself.

Although she has no knowledge about the Sohma Family and is uncertain why Mutsuki and Hajime helped her out and didn't reject her, Sawa works hard to be less self-deprecating and begins building her self-esteem. As she begins befriending and getting to know the Sohma family, she sees they are loving and nurturing, and they help Sawa grapple with her demons and hope for a brighter future.

== Development ==
The series was originally created to promote the collector's edition release of the main series. Additionally, Takaya stated that the main characters from the original series, Tohru, Yuki, and Kyo, would not appear in the story.

== Publication ==
Written and illustrated by Natsuki Takaya, the manga began publication on Hakusensha's HanaLaLa Online manga website on September 4, 2015. In August 2017, the series was moved to Manga Park following HanaLaLa Online's discontinuation. The series was originally set to be twelve chapters and three tankōbon volumes. Following the twelfth chapter's publication, it was announced that a one-shot by Takaya was in development. This one-shot became the series' thirteenth and final chapter, which was released on April 20, 2020, in three parts. The series' individual chapters were collected into a total of four tankōbon volumes.

In November 2017, Yen Press announced that they licensed the series for English publication.

== Reception ==
Overall critical reception was mixed. Koiwai, Gathea, and Einah from Manga News offered praise for the artwork and characters, though they felt the story was a bit slow. Hilary Leung from CBR praised the characters, though felt the story was not fully fleshed-out. Kory Cerjak from The Fandom Post praised the artwork and characters, though he felt the overall story was a bit underwhelming. Sean Gaffney from A Case Suitable for Treatment praised the new characters, though felt the story was boring. Faustine Lillaz from Planete BD felt the manga was a solid return to the series for hard-core fans, though she also criticized the plot as thin.

Manga artist Mengo Yokoyari praised the new characters and their designs. At San Diego Comic-Con 2018, Brigid Alverson picked the series as the "Worst Manga for Anyone, Any Age".
