= Phantom Dream =

Japanese manga series

- First tankōbon volume cover

幻影夢想 (Genei Musō)
- Genre: Dark fantasy, romance
- Manga
- Written by: Natsuki Takaya
- Published by: Hakusensha
- English publisher: AUS: Madman Entertainment; NA: Tokyopop; SG: Chuang Yi
- Magazine: Hana to Yume Planet Zōkan
- Original run: April 15, 1994 – September 30, 1997
- Volumes: 5

Phantom Dream (Japanese: 幻影夢想, Hepburn: Genei Musō) is a Japanese manga series written and illustrated by Natsuki Takaya. It was originally serialized in Hakusensha's shōjo manga magazine Hana to Yume Planet Zōkan from April 1994 to September 1997, with its chapters collected in five tankōbon volumes. The series follows Tamaki Otoya, an ancient summoner, as he battles to protect humanity from evil while also pursuing a romance with his childhood friend Asahi.

== Characters ==
Tamaki Otoya (乙矢環, Otoya Tamaki)
Asahi (如月旭)
Eiji (えいじ)

== Media ==
Written by Natsuki Takaya, Phantom Dream was first serialized in Hana to Yume Planet Zōkan from April 15, 1994, to September 30, 1997. The 15 individual chapters were later compiled and published in five tankōbon volumes by Hakusensha. The first volume was released on February 19, 1996, with the final volume released December 12, 1997.

Chuang Yi licensed the series for English-language publication in Singapore, with all 5 volumes released as of May 2009. These volumes are being re-released in Australia and New Zealand by Madman Entertainment with the final volume released as of June 10, 2009. Tokyopop has licensed the series for English-language publication in North America, with the first volume due for release in December 2008.

The series is also licensed for a regional language release in French by Delcourt.

=== Manga ===
No.	Original release date	Original ISBN	English release date	English ISBN
1	February 19, 1996	4-592-12730-7	April 8, 2008 (SG); June 11, 2008 (Aus/NZ); January 1, 2009 (NA)	978-981-276-266-5 (SG); 978-981-276-271-9 (Aus/NZ); 978-1-4278-1089-2 (NA)
Chapters 1–3; "Request"; "Natsuki Takaya's 'Just Between Us'"
2	April 19, 1996	4-592-11334-9	July 8, 2008 (SG); September 10, 2008 (Aus/NZ); April 7, 2009 (NA)	978-981-276-267-2 (SG); 978-981-276-272-6 (Aus/NZ); 978-1-4278-1090-8 (NA)
Chapters 4–6
3	July 19, 1996	4-592-11601-1	November 6, 2008 (SG); December 10, 2008 (Aus/NZ); August 11, 2009 (NA)	978-981-276-268-9 (SG); 978-981-276-273-3 (Aus/NZ); 978-1-4278-1091-5 (NA)
Chapters 7–9; "Natsuki Takaya's 'Just Between Us'"
4	June 19, 1997	4-592-11603-8	February 10, 2009 (SG); February 10, 2009 (Aus/NZ); November 3, 2009 (NA)	978-981-276-269-6 (SG); 978-981-276-274-0 (Aus/NZ); 978-1427810922 (NA)
Chapters 10–12; "Phantom Dream/Gaiden" (幻影夢想/外伝); "Natsuki Takaya's 'Just Between Us'"
5	December 12, 1997	4-592-12770-6	May 6, 2009 (SG); June 10, 2009 (Aus/NZ); February 2, 2010 (NA)	978-981-274-270-4 (SG); 978-981-276-275-7 (Aus/NZ); 978-1427810939 (NA)
Chapters 13–15

== Reception ==
Publishers Weekly wrote that Phantom Dream would appeal to fans of Takaya and Fruits Basket. According to the reviewer, the plot was "generally predictable" and lacked depth, and the character designs were typical of her work.
