= A Cold Wind Blows (game) =

Party game

A Cold Wind Blows or The Big Wind Blows is a noncompetitive substitute for the game of musical chairs. It was developed in the 1970s as part of the New Games movement, developed by Andrew Fluegelman and colleagues.

== Background ==
The game of musical chairs is often played by children at parties. The Big Wind Blows is a fairly similar game, and is explained below.

== Rules ==
The game involves the same device of a competitive scramble for chairs, but restructures the play elements to provide a different game experience.

A set of chairs, one less than the number of players, is arranged in a circle. One player is initially designated as "it." The person who is "it" stands in the center of the circle; while all other players sit on the chairs. In each round of play, the person who is "it" calls out any sentence, beginning with the words "The Big Wind Blows," that refers to one or more players. For example:

- "The big wind blows if you have a dog."
- "The big wind blows if your name begins with a vowel."
- "The big wind blows if you play a sport."

All of the players for whom the big wind blows—that is, players that fall into the named category—must vacate the chair that they are in and attempt to find another seat. At the same time, "it" attempts to sit in a chair. When all chairs are occupied, the person who failed to get a chair becomes "it" for the next round.

== Benefits ==
In "The Big Wind Blows," no player is ever eliminated and the game can proceed for as long as players are interested in playing. For the player who loses in the scramble, the negative experience is immediately followed by the positive experience of becoming "it" and thus controlling the next round of the game. Finally, the person who is "it" has the advantage of knowing the time of the scramble, exactly which chairs will be vacated, and a short distance to a vacant chair, so the person who is "it" usually finds a chair. Thus players typically become "it" for only one round at a time. Players rarely experience the frustration of losing many consecutive scrambles. No player remains "it" and dominates the game for long. Finally, the challenge of having to invent new categories—this is not usually stated as a rule but most players feel that they must do so—tends to mean that different people participate in each scramble, and most players participate in frequent scrambles and get turns of becoming "it."

The game is very stable in the sense that it is not spoiled even if "it" deliberately chooses categories that contain a single selected person. (When this happens, the usual outcome is that "it" successfully grabs the selected person's seat while the selected person becomes "it"). Indeed, the balance of frustration and reward is so even that nobody is ever sure whether having "the big wind blow" for a single person is an expression of rivalry or of affection.

The game combines the physical elements of the scramble with the mental requirements of alertness, logic, and reasoning in the construction of the categories.

Groups of children, even children of mixed age and agility, can play this game for long periods of time without becoming frustrated or angry.

== See also ==
- Fruit Basket Turnover, almost exactly the same game by a different name.
- Do You Love Your Neighbor?, almost exactly the same game.
