= Colwell-Winfield Blues Band =

American blues band

The Colwell-Winfield Blues Band was an American blues band formed in 1968.

The band included Bill Colwell and Mike Winfield, guitar and bass, then vocalist Moose Sorrento, with Chuck Purro on drums and Jack Schroer on saxophone and Collin Tilton flute. They played at various festivals and produced one album, Cold Wind Blues, in 1968. They played Woodstock Sound-Outs with Cat Mother & the All Night Newsboys, Fear Itself, and Don McLean, and Thee Experience. The band hired singer James Montgomery during his junior year to play harmonica and tour with Janis Joplin.
