= Fruits Basket (2001 TV series) =

- Funimation's release of the Fruits Basket complete series
- Based on: Fruits Basket
- Country of origin: Japan

Original release
- Network: TV Tokyo
- Release: July 5 – December 27, 2001

Fruits Basket was adapted into a twenty-six episode anime series by Studio Deen and premiered in Japan on TV Tokyo on July 5 with the final episode airing on December 27, 2001. Based on the twenty-three volume manga series Fruits Basket written by Natsuki Takaya, the series tells the story of Tohru Honda, an orphan girl living in a tent so as not to trouble anyone. After meeting Yuki, Kyo, and Shigure Sohma (who later ask her to do their housework in exchange for a room to stay in), she learns thirteen members of the Sohma family are possessed by the animals of the Chinese zodiac legend and cursed to turn into their animal forms if they embrace anyone of the opposite sex or if their bodies are under great stress. The series was directed by Akitaro Daichi. Funimation aired the series, in dubbed English, on their anime television channel as well as on Colours TV.

Fruits Basket was released to DVD in nine individual volumes by King Records on a monthly schedule from September 29, 2001, through May 22, 2002, with a series box set released on April 25, 2007. The series is licensed for Region 1 and Region 2 release by Funimation, which released it as four individual DVD volumes containing 6-7 episodes and as a complete series box set. As part of their release, Funimation renamed all of the episodes, which originally had simple names of "First story", "Second story", etc. On November 20, 2007, Funimation re-released the series as part of their lower priced Viridian line, with the new release containing the complete series in a thin-packed box set. The Region 2 United Kingdom releases were done through a sub-licensing agreement with Revelation Films. The series was released in Region 4 by Madman Entertainment as a series box set. The series uses three pieces of theme music, all performed by Ritsuko Okazaki. "For Fruits Basket" (For フルーツバスケット, For Furūtsu Basuketto) is used for the opening theme for all twenty-six episodes. "Chiisana Inori" (小さな祈り, lit. Small Prayer) is used for the series ending theme, except for episode twenty-five, which uses the song "Serenade" (セレナーデ, Serenāde). In the English version, the theme songs were rewritten and redubbed with the English voice actresses Meredith McCoy performing the opening theme, Laura Bailey performing the 1st ending theme and Daphne Gere performing the 2nd ending theme.

== Episodes ==
No.	Title	Original release date	English air date
1	"The Strangest Day"; Transliteration: "Dai Ichi Wa" (Japanese: 第一話)	July 5, 2001	October 29, 2002
Tohru Honda, a high school girl, runs into her classmate Yuki and his older cousin, Shigure Sohma, as she passes by a house with little figurines of the Chinese zodiac laid out on the front porch. Since her mother, Kyoko Honda, recently died in a car accident and her father, Katsuya Honda, died when she was young, she subsequently moved in with her grandfather. However, due to her grandfather's house needing renovation, she takes to living in a tent on Sohma land, but doesn't realize the property belongs to anyone. After Yuki and Shigure become aware of this one night, they invite her into their home and later reach an agreement where Tohru works as a housekeeper in return for room and board. Not long after, Kyo Sohma crashes through the roof of her new room to challenge Yuki to a fight. However, Tohru, in an attempt to stop the fight from happening, accidentally embraces each of them. She finds out that Kyo, Yuki, and Shigure turn into a Cat, a Rat, and a Dog, respectively.
2	"The Sohma Curse"; Transliteration: "Dai Ni Wa" (Japanese: 第二話)	July 12, 2001	October 29, 2002
Tohru discovers the Sohma family secret; thirteen members of the Sohma family are possessed by the vengeful spirits of the animals of the Chinese zodiac, and they transform into said animals if embraced by the opposite gender. Later, Yuki talks to Tohru concerning the family secret, and he warns that her memories of the family secret and there having even met might be erased. Meanwhile, Shigure visits Akito Sohma, the head of the Sohma family, who decides to entrust Tohru with the Sohma secret. Shigure mentions that he has registered Kyo for high school, forcing Kyo to live with him and the others.
3	"All Shapes and Sizes"; Transliteration: "Dai San Wa" (Japanese: 第三話)	July 19, 2001	October 29, 2002
Yuki confronts Kyo about his anti-social behavior during his first day of school. Kyo reveals that while Yuki may want nothing more than to escape the Sohmas, he himself only wants to be accepted as a real member of the family. Tohru stops the two of them fighting by accidentally hugging Kyo, who yells at her in anger. Later on, Kyo meets Tohru in the forest on her way home to apologize for all the trouble he caused. Tohru forgives him, and the two reconcile. The next day, Yuki picks her up from work and she accidentally makes him transform into a rat. Yuki reverts to human form, and in an attempt to save his plants from the rain, takes Tohru to his secret garden where they try their best to cover the vegetables. Yuki confesses that he is only kind so others will like him, and admits that he is not as charming and polite as he appears. Tohru responds by saying that kindness comes and grows in all shapes and sizes.
4	"Here Comes Kagura!"; Transliteration: "Dai Yon Wa" (Japanese: 第四話)	July 26, 2001	October 29, 2002
After hearing he was living with Shigure, Kagura Sohma, the Boar of the Chinese zodiac, pays Kyo a visit, much to his chagrin. Tohru is surprised to discover that Kagura is actually older than them, despite her appearance. Kagura is madly in love with Kyo, but is clumsy and ill-mannered, and causes much upheaval and destruction in the household. At first Kagura is envious of Tohru, due to her living situation with Kyo, but she ends up befriending Tohru after getting to know Tohru's gentle kindness before departing at the end of the episode.
5	"A Rice Ball in a Fruits Basket"; Transliteration: "Dai Go Wa" (Japanese: 第五話)	August 2, 2001	October 29, 2002
Tohru finally goes back to living with her paternal grandfather, as his house renovations are complete. However, this turns out to be harder for Tohru than she thought, and leaves the Sohma family despondent. Joining Tohru in her grandfather's house are her paternal relatives, who view her more as a burden than a blessing. After a series of situations in which they are shown to be verbally abusive, Tohru's grandfather urges her to go where she would be happier. Yuki and Kyo arrive hoping to bring her back home as she confesses that she is more satisfied living with the Sohma family. They all return to their house to meet up with Shigure. Tohru is happy to continue her new life living with the Sohma family.
6	"Invincible Friendship"; Transliteration: "Dai Roku Wa" (Japanese: 第六話)	August 9, 2001	October 29, 2002
Tohru invites her friends, Arisa Uotani and Saki Hanajima, to the Sohma household residence. Yuki, Kyo, and Shigure worry about what will happen if Arisa and Saki discover the Sohma family secret. The three struggle as they try to get acquainted with the girls while hiding their nervousness. Over the course of the visit, the boys have numerous encounters making contact with the girls, thereby transforming into their animal forms. Arisa and Saki, unaware of their transformations, become very suspicious, and Tohru gets increasingly nervous after each close call. Arisa and Saki soon realize that Tohru belongs in the Sohma household residence, after seeing how the Sohma family admires her, and depart none the wiser.
7	"A Plum on the Back"; Transliteration: "Dai Nana Wa" (Japanese: 第七話)	August 16, 2001	January 20, 2003
The high school is planning cultural festival, blueprinting a creative idea regarding rice balls. The class picks Yuki's hit-or-miss method over Kyo's all-or-nothing plan. Tohru realizes that Yuki and Kyo admire each other, comparing them to rice balls with pickled plums on their backs. During the cultural festival, Yuki is asked to wear a dress, much to his humiliation. Soon thereafter, Momiji Sohma and Hatori Sohma, the Rabbit and Dragon of the Chinese zodiac respectively, pay a visit. Tohru learns from Hatori that Yuki has asthma, though it is steadily becoming less severe. Momiji insists on hugging Tohru and transforms into a rabbit, causing complications for everyone. Yuki warns Tohru to not be alone with Hatori, as he is the Sohma who erases memories. Hatori soon privately enjoins her to visit the Sohma main residence alone, although Momiji insists he will be there with her as well, after which Tohru becomes worried that her memories may be erased.
8	"Don't Cry, For the Snow will Surely Melt"; Transliteration: "Dai Hachi Wa" (Japanese: 第八話)	August 23, 2001	January 20, 2003
Tohru is amazed at the grandeur of the Sohma main residence. Hatori calls for her in his room, where she is told more about the Sohma family secret. Later, Momiji tells Tohru about Hatori's past. It is revealed that he was involved with Kana Sohma, and that his left eye was injured by Akito because of it. This trauma caused Kana to fall into a deep depression as she blamed herself for Hatori's injury, so he erased her memories of their love to end her suffering. As it begins to snow, Hatori notices how strongly Tohru resembles Kana. Tohru accidentally slips off the front porch of the room, Hatori embraces her to break her fall, and turns into a seahorse, rather than a dragon. Once he reverts back, after drying off, Shigure turns up with Momiji and hot drinks. On the way home, Tohru catches a glimpse of Akito but does not formally meet him.
9	"A Solitary New Year"; Transliteration: "Dai Kyuu Wa" (Japanese: 第九話)	August 30, 2001	January 20, 2003
While Tohru, Yuki, and Kyo, along with Arisa and Saki, help spruce up the Sohma household residence for New Year's Day, Shigure is harassed by his editor, Mitsuru, to finish his manuscript. After Mitsuru is given the completed manuscript and after Arisa and Saki help clean the house, Tohru is told that the boys will be spending their New Year's Day at a banquet held in the main residence. However, Yuki and Kyo have their own excuses not to go to. Shigure convinces the two to attend the banquet, but the three are stopped by Saki, who subtly convinces Yuki and Kyo to stay with Tohru, who would otherwise be spending the day alone, while Shigure goes on to the main residence alone. Shigure informs Akito of Yuki and Kyo's absence, and Tohru, Yuki, and Kyo watch the sunrise together, making wishes for the New Year.
10	"Make It Clear If It's Black or White"; Transliteration: "Dai Juu Wa" (Japanese: 第十話)	September 6, 2001	January 20, 2003
Yuki comes down with a fever. Although Tohru tries to convince him to stay home, he accepts a challenge from Kyo to a contest: he must win the endurance run at school the following day. Tohru meets Hatsuharu Sohma, the Ox of the Chinese zodiac, during the endurance run. Hatsuharu has difficulty with his sense of direction and has been lost for three days while looking for Kyo. Hatsuharu intentionally trips Kyo during the challenge against Yuki because he has come to challenge Kyo to a fight. Kyo refuses at first, which triggers "Black Haru", Hatsuharu's dark side, and they begin fighting. However, as Tohru and Yuki watch the two fight, Yuki feverishly collapses. Hatsuharu clasps Tohru to transform into an ox, so he can carry Yuki back to the household residence. Later on, Hatsuharu explains to Tohru why he used to hate the clever Rat for insulting the foolish Ox. However, he further explains how he later came to forgive himself and love Yuki.
11	"Everybody Loves Chocolate"; Transliteration: "Dai Juu Ichi Wa" (Japanese: 第十一話)	September 13, 2001	January 20, 2003
On Valentine's Day, Tohru decides to buy chocolates for Sohma relatives that she had recently met to thank them for everything they've done for her. Meanwhile, Kyo has to deal with Kagura and refuses to eat the chocolate she bought him. After a month, the high school takes midterm exams. Shortly thereafter, Tohru decides to work overtime, but for unknown reasons. Later in the evening, Momiji comes by the household residence to invite Tohru on a trip to a hot springs resort for White Day, to which Yuki and Kyo would eventually tag along. Shigure gets a phone call from Tohru's grandfather saying that the fees for her class trip haven't been paid, and Yuki, Kyo, and Shigure then realize that she used her job money in order to buy chocolates for everyone. Kyo becomes aggravated, knowing that she could have spent all the money on herself rather than on everyone else. Momiji tells a story of a foolish traveler who seemed too generous and was always tricked. He compares the traveler to Tohru, commenting on how she gives so that everyone can be happy even if she is not.
12	"White Day"; Transliteration: "Dai Juu Ni Wa" (Japanese: 第十二話)	September 20, 2001	January 20, 2003
Tohru, Yuki, Kyo, and Momiji go to the Sohma hot springs resort. The group is startled by the hostess of the hot springs resort, who apologizes repeatedly for her actions; she eventually reveals to Tohru that her son is a member of the Chinese zodiac. Tohru becomes lightheaded when in the hot springs bath as Momiji has her sing with him, and passes out. Later on, Tohru plays ping-pong with Kyo, but she misses the ball served by him. As Yuki leaves the room, Tohru follows him, discovering that he admits he would have been ashamed to laugh in front of Kyo and Momiji. He then surprises her with a gift for White Day, two gold hair ribbons fit for a real princess. Afterwards, Tohru finds out that Momiji and Hatsuharu will be enrolled for high school the following semester, much to the surprise of Tohru, who thought Momiji was in elementary school.
13	"A New School Term Starts!"; Transliteration: "Dai Juu San Wa" (Japanese: 第十三話)	September 27, 2001	March 25, 2003
Momiji and Hatsuharu begin their first year in high school. Kyo saves Tohru from two high school boys while he helps Tohru look for Momiji and Hatsuharu. Kyo sees Momiji wearing a girls uniform, much to his chagrin, and sees Hatsuharu wearing a male uniform, much to his relief. The student council president, Takei Makoto, arrives to rant on about Momiji's outfit as well as Hatsuharu's seemingly unnatural black and white hair, however Hatsuharu defends Momiji's honor against Takei. Akito comes to the high school and introduces himself to Tohru. Yuki is terrified when he sees Akito with Tohru, assuming he threatened her, or did something else. Akito then confronts him about skipping the banquet held on New Year's Day. He threatens Yuki about his past, to when he was whipped constantly in an isolated room, which physically and mentally traumatizes Yuki. Tohru interrupts this by pushing Akito away, however feeling awful for doing it, in order to excuse Yuki to go back to class with her. Akito takes his leave soon thereafter. Tohru, Yuki, Kyo, Momiji, Hatsuharu, Arisa, and Saki all spend an afternoon playing badminton, in an attempt to cheer Yuki up. Meanwhile, Hatori philosophically mentions to Shigure that if Yuki could be hurt by Akito, then he could also be healed by Tohru.
14	"The Adult's Episode - Ayame's a Messed Up Snake!"; Transliteration: "Dai Juu Yon Wa" (Japanese: 第十四話)	October 4, 2001	March 25, 2003
Ayame Sohma, the Snake of the Chinese zodiac decides to pay a visit to the household residence, supposedly to see Yuki, being his older brother. It turns out Ayame is disliked by everyone except for Shigure and Hatori, as they were his childhood playmates. Ayame later tells Tohru that he has been separated from Yuki since he was born, making it difficult to bond with him. After hearing his story, Tohru devotes herself in assisting him. However, Ayame proves to be arduous for Yuki to cope with. Ayame begins to tell stories about how he was able to keep his long hair and his experience as the student council president when he was in high school. Hatsuharu soon contacts Hatori to take Ayame back to the Sohma main residence. It is revealed that Ayame only listens to Hatori because of his admiration for him.
15	"There Are No Memories It's OK to Forget"; Transliteration: "Dai Juu Go Wa" (Japanese: 第十五話)	October 11, 2001	March 25, 2003
Yuki, Kyo, Arisa, and Saki all come along with Tohru to visit the tombstone of Kyoko, Tohru's mother. Yuki wonders how Tohru can be content with her life after the deaths of both her mother and father. They soon have a picnic in front of the tombstone to commemorate the memory of Kyoko. Saki begins to worry about Tohru's life among the Sohma family. Later on, during work, Tohru unexpectedly meets Momiji, who explains his parents' roles within the building she works at and that he has a little sister. Momiji explains to her that his mother rejected him for being a member of the Chinese zodiac, and, as a result, requested for her memories of him to be erased. He lives apart from his family and his sister, Momo Sohma, doesn't know they are siblings. Tohru and Momiji then vow to keep their memories to be strong enough in the future to come to terms with them and be able to look back at those memories with fondness.
16	"If We've Three Then We Don't Need To Fear Jason"; Transliteration: "Dai Juu Roku Wa" (Japanese: 第十六話)	October 18, 2001	March 25, 2003
Tohru, Yuki, Kyo, Shigure, and Hatori voyage to the Sohma summer house for a vacation. Yuki and Kyo decide to take a stroll with Tohru into the nearby forest. Tohru becomes worried when Kyo and Yuki are silent for unknown reasons. This causes her to lose balance and fall. Yuki and Kyo try to grab a hold of her, but they end up transforming into their animal forms trying to help break her fall. The two begin to bicker over nothing, and Tohru is relieved to see them act like their normal selves. They explain that they have started being comfortable around her and let their guard down. Later on, Shigure contacts Ayame to join the rest of the group at the summer house, much to the despair of Yuki and Kyo. Yuki and Kyo then decide to walk toward the nearby lake. Meanwhile, Ayame tells Shigure and Hatori that Kana has been recently married to someone, reminding Hatori of his times with her. Ayame again tries to bond with Yuki, but it ends in failure. Tohru accidentally turns Ayame into a Snake, and Yuki throws Ayame into the lake.
17	"It's Because I've Been Loved That I've Become Stronger"; Transliteration: "Dai Juu Nana Wa" (Japanese: 第十七話)	October 25, 2001	March 25, 2003
During a downpour, Tohru and Yuki encounter Hatsuharu who introduces Tohru to the young Kisa Sohma, the Tiger of the Chinese zodiac. Kisa won't speak due to being bullied at school. Yuki feels empathy for her after he learns that Kisa ran away from her home and stopped attending middle school. Kisa's mother later arrives, worried as to why she ran away from home. Tohru responds by saying that Kisa might fear rejection by her mother if she knew about Kisa being bullied at school. It is agreed for Kisa to stay at Shigure's house until further notice. During that time, Kisa clings to Tohru, following her wherever Tohru goes. Tohru is very loving and understanding towards Kisa during this time, such as letting the little girl sleep on her lap. Tohru and Yuki meet with Momiji and Hatsuharu after school, figuring out that Kisa was bullied at her school for her hair and eye color. After Hatsuharu receives a letter from Kisa's middle school, Yuki reads it to her. Yuki and Hatsuharu encourage her to speak and later to attend school again, after they explain that one must be accepted by others before one can be accepted by oneself.
18	"The Strongest Tag - The Cursed Electric Wave Brother and Sister"; Transliteration: "Dai Juu Hachi Wa" (Japanese: 第十八話)	November 1, 2001	March 25, 2003
Motoko Minagawa and the other members of the Prince Yuki fan club initiate a scheme to seemingly do an interview with Saki to better understand her psychic ability of sending and receiving electric waves. It is later revealed that the fan club plans to seek revenge, finding out the weakness of Saki in order to gain access to Tohru. The fan club is invited to the Hanajima residence and end up searching Saki's bedroom for information. They unexpectedly encounter and are introduced to Megumi Hanajima, Saki's younger brother. Megumi tells the fan club about his ability to curse people after learning their names. Saki then figures out that the fan club is only concerned as to why Tohru is spending so much time with Yuki, startling the fan club. Megumi explains that love can be a source of both pleasure and pain and must not be forced upon others. He then seemingly curses them after calling out their names, to which they quickly depart. Saki narrates revealing her weakness being Tohru, as she is always protective of Tohru.
19	"The Source of Cheer Can Be Affected By Colds Too"; Transliteration: "Dai Juu Kyuu Wa" (Japanese: 第十九話)	November 8, 2001	May 27, 2003
Due to depression and stress because of failing one test on the midterm exams, Tohru comes down with a fever and is bedridden. Even though Tohru is worried about making dinner or going to work, Kyo and Shigure tell her to get some rest until the fever lets up. Shigure calls Momiji to tell him Tohru won't be going to work today because of illness, but Momiji decides to cover her shift himself. Kyo decides to make leek soup to care for her. Shigure ridicules Kyo after he notices Kyo wearing a gas mask and goggles while cooking the leek soup. When Kyo gives the leek soup to Tohru, she later starts to cry, explaining to him that the failed test and the fever were the sources of her depression and stress. After Tohru goes to sleep, Yuki arrives, only to find out that Kyo used the leeks in Yuki's garden to make the leek soup. Momiji, Hatori, and Kisa visit the household residence to check up on Tohru. Yuki comes by to give her a study guide he constructed for her in preparation for the retest of the midterm exam, which she later takes and passes.
20	"Ayame's Secret Life"; Transliteration: "Dai Ni Juu Wa" (Japanese: 第二十話)	November 15, 2001	May 27, 2003
After Ayame advertises about his store, Tohru and Yuki decide to pay him a visit. Once there, they are surprised to learn that it is a specialty clothing store stocked with erotic themed outfits. Mine Kuramae, Ayame's assistant explains to Yuki all the types of uniform she wears, putting him in a state of confusion. Mine later decides to dress up Tohru in a golden dress, so that Ayame can spend time bonding with Yuki. Yuki is able to make Ayame realize that they are two different people, with opposite personalities. The kindness in Yuki is what Ayame admires. Yuki gets to see a "very cute Honda-san" after Mine brings out Tohru wearing the new outfit. Yuki eventually states he must accept Ayame for who he is.
21	"Sophist Boy Has Captured The Prince"; Transliteration: "Dai Ni Juu Ichi Wa" (Japanese: 第ニ十一話)	November 22, 2001	May 27, 2003
While on her way to work, Tohru encounters Hiro Sohma, the Ram/Sheep of the Chinese zodiac. He is shown as a person who practices sophism, and constantly hurls verbal insults. Hiro steals Tohru's notebook from her handbag, causing her to panic since that is where she puts her late mother's photo. Tohru, Kyo, Momiji, and Kisa all find and confront him about this deed. Returning her notebook, Hiro then admits his jealousy toward Tohru, because of how much time she spends with Kisa, and how much Kisa loves her. While Tohru and Kisa spend time with Hiro, Kyo becomes upset by the way Hiro is treating Tohru. It is later discovered that Hiro is fond of Kisa and wants to protect her, and that he blames himself for not defending her when she was bullied at school. Tohru takes them to a playground and they stop by a nearby vendor for crêpe. She cheers Hiro up by saying that he is courageous for being able to admit his shortcomings and for always caring for Kisa.
22	"Prince Yuki Fan Club"; Transliteration: "Dai Ni Juu Ni Banashi" (Japanese: 第ニ十ニ話)	November 29, 2001	May 27, 2003
The Prince Yuki fan club is curious to know if there will be any females that will be appointed to the student council, since Yuki will be the student council president the following year. However, Takei denies them access to this information. They later pass by and catch a glimpse at Tohru conversing with Yuki, which, in turn, infuriates them. Motoko must think about graduation from high school as well as her resignation from the fan club. Motoko enlists the assistance of Rika Aida in order to infiltrate the student council office. Once there, they run into Yuki. They end up talking about leeks because Mokoto gets very anxious when talking to Yuki. After she runs away toward the school grounds, Yuki finds her and apologizes for what he did or said that could have hurt her feelings. Mokoto now understands how connected Tohru and Yuki are together.
23	"Is The Rumored Ri That Mother's Daughter?"; Transliteration: "Dai Ni Juu San Wa" (Japanese: 第ニ十三話)	December 6, 2001	May 27, 2003
On her way to the household residence, Tohru bumps into Ritsu Sohma, the Monkey of the Chinese zodiac. Ritsu is known for being a cross-dresser, very apologetic, and deeply depressed. As the two appear at the household residence, Ritsu gives some presents to Shigure. Ritsu decides to leave before he causes any trouble for Tohru and the others. However, Tohru wanted to serve him some tea before his departure. After Tohru accidentally breaks one of the tea glasses, Ritsu has a panic attack, thinking it was his fault. Tohru tries to stop him from stepping in the broken glass, but she turns him into a monkey, getting cut in the process. Ritsu goes to the roof of the house to commit suicide, but after Tohru convinces him not to, he nearly falls off the roof, twisting his ankle in the process. Ritsu asks to stay at the household residence for three days, with Hatori looking over him. While walking back from school, Tohru runs into Ritsu again, who plans to bring a bag of jelly buns for Shigure. Tohru and Ritsu sit on a park bench to talk about his cross-dressing, his apologizing, and his depression. Tohru comforts him by saying that everyone has a reason to live, a reason that everyone must search for.
24	"The Curse of the Cat"; Transliteration: "Dai Ni Juu Yon Wa" (Japanese: 第ニ十四話)	December 13, 2001	May 27, 2003
On a rainy afternoon, Tohru learns that Kyo becomes irritable when it downpours. Tohru, Yuki, and Kyo walk to the household residence, only to be greeted by Kagura. Shigure sends Kagura off with Kyo to do some shopping, to prevent the house from being wrecked by her affectionate outbursts. At the store, Kyo questions Kagura as to why she cares so much about him. Meanwhile, Tohru and Yuki go to visit the garden to see what can be harvested. Later in the evening, the four of them make their way back to the house. Shortly thereafter, Kazuma Sohma, a martial arts instructor and Kyo's adoptive father, arrives. He talks to Kyo privately about his stay with Yuki and Shigure, to which Kyo responds negatively. Having seen Kyo smiling freely with Tohru, he tells Shigure discreetly that he is going to remove Kyo's beaded bracelet from his wrist. During a deluged nightfall, Kazuma talks with Kyo outside, contemplating if he has accepted the Sohma family curse. Seeing Tohru approaching, Kazuma suddenly pulls of the bead bracelet from Kyo's wrist, initiating Kyo's transformation into a monstrous entity. When Tohru tries to go to Kyo, he yells at her not to look at him, and runs away.
25	"True Form"; Transliteration: "Dai Ni Juu Go Wa" (Japanese: 第二十五話)	December 20, 2001	May 27, 2003
After his bead bracelet is removed from his wrist, Kyo transforms into a monstrous creature right in front of Tohru, causing him to sprint away. Tohru follows after him, but she trips behind a tree and begins to vomit. Akito appears, as he taunts her about the knowledge of the Sohma family secret. Akito soon leaves when Shigure locates the two. He apologizes for her finding out the truth about Kyo, and Tohru continues to walk into the forest wordlessly. Back at the home, Kagura talks with Yuki, saying that only Tohru can help Kyo, which, in turn, convinces Yuki to go out to find Tohru. It is revealed that Kazuma took Kyo in as his adoptive son because Kazuma's grandfather suffered the curse of the Cat before Kyo was born. Meanwhile, Arisa and Saki head to Kyoko's tombstone once again, after Saki senses negative electric waves coming from Tohru. As they approach, they see a distraught Tohru. Saki forbids Arisa from consoling her and tearfully orders Tohru to continue searching for Kyo.
26	"Let's Go Home"; Transliteration: "Saishuu Kai" (Japanese: 最終回)	December 27, 2001	May 27, 2003
Kyo is reminded of when his mother would check his bead bracelet often, due to her fear of his true form. Tohru finally finds Kyo by a lake. He tries to run away from her, but is restrained by Yuki. Tohru grasps Kyo's arm and tells him that she is frightened by his true form, but still wants to be together with him. Kyo calms down and changes back to his human form as the rain stops and the sun rises. He explains his mother always claimed to love him but was terrified of his true form. As they hug, Kyo changes into a cat. Tohru carries him home in her arms, with Yuki following, and they are greeted by a relieved Shigure and Kazuma. Soon thereafter, Kazuma says his farewells to Kyo, as he takes his leave. Later on, after Tohru asks Shigure permission to speak with Akito, he talks to her privately, mentioning that Akito bears the core of the curse and does not have very long to live. Yuki, Shigure, and Hatori accompany Tohru to the Sohma main residence to see Akito. After an initially meek exchange, Akito seizes her by her hair in a rage after Tohru is unable to say why she came, but Yuki and Shigure restrain him from hurting her further. However, she begins to feel sympathetic, explaining that he still has a life to live. Releasing her hair from his hand, Akito eventually realizes that Tohru accepts the Sohma family curse. The series ends on a bright future day with Tohru, Yuki, and Kyo back at the residence where they live.

== Home media ==
=== Region 1 ===
In Region 1, the series was released on DVD by Funimation. Funimation released the series in four single disc volumes, with English and Japanese audio and English subtitles. The first two volumes include six episodes, while the final two have seven. The series was released as a box set on November 16, 2004. In 2007, Funimation began re-releasing the individual volumes as part of their value priced Viridian Collection. Other than a slightly redesigned cover to include the Viridian Collection tag, the volumes are identical to the regular versions. The series box set was also re-released as part of the Viridian Collection, in the form of a thin-pack set. A 16th anniversary Blu-ray boxset of the series was issued on August 1, 2017, containing a 24-page series guide art booklet and new extras.

Title	Original release	Viridian release
Fruits Basket, Volume 1: A Great Transformation	October 29, 2002	September 4, 2007
Fruits Basket, Volume 2: What Becomes of Snow?	January 21, 2003	September 4, 2007
Fruits Basket, Volume 3: Puddles of Memories	March 25, 2003	October 5, 2007
Fruits Basket, Volume 4: The Clearing Sky	May 27, 2003	October 5, 2007
Fruits Basket Series Box Set	November 16, 2004	November 20, 2007

=== Region 2 (Japan) ===
The series was originally released in Japan in nine individual DVD volumes by King Records, with each volume containing three episodes except for the first volume, which contained two. The first, sixth, eighth, and ninth volumes were also given limited edition releases. The first and sixth limited edition volumes included a series box, while the eight included a set of six trading cards and a figurine. The final volume's limited-edition version also included a figurine. A deluxe season box set was released on April 25, 2007. In addition to the complete series, the box set includes a message card from Natsuki Takaya, a 60-page deluxe booklet, and a bonus Fruits Basket CD soundtrack. All of the original volumes have Japanese language tracks with no subtitles.

Volume	Date
Fruits Basket 1	September 29, 2001
Fruits Basket 2	October 30, 2001
Fruits Basket 3	November 29, 2001
Fruits Basket 4	December 29, 2001
Fruits Basket 5	January 26, 2002
Fruits Basket 6	February 28, 2002
Fruits Basket 7	March 27, 2002
Fruits Basket 8	April 24, 2002
Fruits Basket 9	May 22, 2002
Fruits Basket DVD Box	April 25, 2007

=== Region 2 (Europe) ===
Through their deal with Funimation for subleasing titles, MVM Entertainment released the series to Region 2 DVD in Europe. The series was released as four individual volumes which are identical to those released by Funimation in Region 1. On November 14, 2006, Funimation announced that MVM would not longer be distributing their titles. Instead, all of their title distribution in the United Kingdom would be handled by Revelation Films. Revelation Films re-released the four individual volumes under their label and released the series box set on January 22, 2007.

However MVM have regained the licence and re-released the series as a four disc set on February 6, 2012, in the UK. MVM also released the Blu-ray Collector's Edition on February 19, 2018.

Title	MVM Entertainment	Revelation Films
Fruits Basket, Volume 1	April 5, 2004	January 22, 2007
Fruits Basket, Volume 2	June 7, 2004	January 22, 2007
Fruits Basket, Volume 3	August 9, 2004	February 22, 2007
Fruits Basket, Volume 4	September 20, 2004	February 22, 2007
Fruits Basket Box Set	February 13, 2012	January 22, 2007

=== Region 4 ===
Fruits Basket was released to Region 4 DVD by Madman Entertainment on October 15, 2003, in the form of a complete series box set. The set uses the same box set used for the original Region 1 release of the complete series by Funimation. The on-disc extras in the set include character profiles, textless opening and closing sequences, a behind the scenes featurette, an interview with the director, and image galleries.

== See also ==
- Fruits Basket (2019 TV series)
