= Tsubasa: Those with Wings =

Japanese manga series

- Cover of volume 1 of the tankōbon edition

翼を持つ者 (Tsubasa o Motsu Mono)
- Genre: Adventure, fantasy
- Manga
- Written by: Natsuki Takaya
- Published by: Hakusensha
- English publisher: AUS: Madman Entertainment; NA: Tokyopop
- Magazine: Hana to Yume
- Original run: October 1995 – May 1998
- Volumes: 6

Tsubasa: Those with Wings (Japanese: 翼を持つ者, Hepburn: Tsubasa o Motsu Mono) is a shōjo manga by Natsuki Takaya. It was serialized by Hakusensha from 1995 to 1998 in Hana to Yume, and collected in six tankōbon volumes; it was republished in 2007 in three bunkobon volumes. The series is licensed in English in North America by Tokyopop, which began releasing translations of the bunkobon volumes in spring of 2009.

== Story ==
The manga is set at the end of the 22nd century, where the Earth has practically been destroyed by the many wars that have taken place. The rich and the army live comfortably, whereas the rest of the world lives in a state of poverty.

Tsubasa: Those with Wings revolves around the life of Kotobuki, an ex-thief who tries to find a job for herself. Travelling with her is Raimon, who believes the word genius exists for his sake, which is actually quite true. He used to be a military commander and would often run into Kotobuki, but never caught her. Each has fulfilled their dream, Kotobuki's is to forget about thievery, and Raimon's is to leave the militia and to live with Kotobuki forever. However, people seeking the Tsubasa, a legendary object that grants wishes, never stop causing them trouble. This object appeared long ago, but its current location is unknown. Everyone is trying to claim it as their own and use Kotobuki and Raimon's skills to do so.

== Characters ==
Kotobuki (寿)
An ex-thief who used her skills from the age of 6 to survive. She is aged around 15 to 16 and is very agile and strong. Kotobuki does not like to act spoiled. She is a war orphan, a 'nameless one', and as such has compassion for other orphans like her. She was raised in an orphanage by a gentle woman named Ann, who she viewed as her 'mother'. The orphanage was burnt down while Kotobuki was out getting Ann medicine, leaving her the sole survivor. She then takes up thievery in order to survive, and is very talented at it though she dislikes it. She meets Raimon during her time as a thief, and though he initially annoys her she ends up falling in love with him. During the story Kotobuki's goal is to find Tsubasa so she can wish the bomb out of his head. She temporarily leaves Raimon while visiting ancient Japan to find Tsubasa, while he must stay due to his bomb. Hil ends up falling in love with Kotobuki as he sees her as a replacement for Ann. At the end, Hil tells her that if she becomes his he would deactivate Raimon's bomb. Hil tries to seduce her several times throughout the story. Kotobuki goes to rescue Raimon after he is kidnapped by the military, and succeeds with the help of Shouka's gang, Yan, and Phere. At the end, Raimon and Kotobuki are engaged to be married.
Raimon Shiragi (擂文·シラギ)
An ex-military commander who quit his job to be with Kotobuki. He is a genius and his skills always get him out of touchy situations. He loves Kotobuki dearly and if anyone attempts to hurt her, he sometimes cruelly makes sure they don't try again. Raimon was born into a poor family, and left so they had fewer mouths to feed. He then asked Ross to adopt him, with the promise he would 'help him to bad things'. Ever since he was a child, he has had no emotions, which makes him extremely depressed as a teenager as he feels he is less than human. He attempts suicide several times before meeting Kotobuki, when he realizes his problem was he gave up trying to find a reason for living before he even started. He then begins following her around, ultimately leaving the military to stay with her. The military put a bomb in his head during his time with them, so if he goes over the border his head will explode. Raimon does not like his head to be touched. In order to save his life like he has saved hers many times, Kotobuki is searching for Tsubasa to wish the bomb out of his head. He does not get along with Shouka and Adelaide, and whenever Shouka is in a dangerous situation he narrates her 'unavoidable' death rather than try to help her. He claims that his reason for life is to love Kotobuki.
Shouka (抄華, Shōka)
The leader of a group of thieves who was once caught by Raimon. She specializes in explosives and wants to get the Tsubasa for herself. She runs slowly and has no coordination whatsoever. Rich, refined, and beautiful, Shouka is currently seeking a lover. Because of Raimon's intelligence, all her attempts to find Tsubasa backfire, which is partially why she hates him. Though she initially also dislikes Kotobuki, she teams up with her and Raimon several times and risks herself to help Kotobuki save Raimon's life. She later goes to Japan with Adelaide and Kotobuki. One of her lackeys loves her, and attempts to propose, but she claims that she will not accept until it is more romantic. She originally claims her wish is for riches, power, and lovers, but it is actually to revive her younger sister, who was killed by a bandit while they were young. She originally came from a rich family, but they were attacked by bandits and she was then taken in by a thief boss.
Hil Guill (ヒルト·ギル, Hiruto Giru)
Hil is a colonel, and has considerable power within the army. He is in charge of the mission to find "the Wing" for the army, and he is the direct superior of Phere, Touya, and Raimon. He intends to use Raimon and his talents to his advantage, and once convinces an emotionless Raimon to be his 'doll'. He becomes very intrigued with Kotobuki, who somehow made Raimon leave him, and later falls in love with her as a replacement for someone-later revealed to be Ann. He is very cold and manipulative, but his true purpose is not of an ambition. Hil's true reason for searching for "the Wing" is hidden until the end of the story, which brings out an incredible twist. Ann, already introduced as the woman who raised Kotobuki, was his older sister whom he loved obsessively. She left when he was young to run an orphanage, leaving him heartbroken and bitter. He finds her during a mission for the army, but is overcome with bitterness and jealousy and shoots her and the orphans. He then burned the orphanage down to the ground, and took Ann's body back with him. He put her on life-supporting machines which kept her body functional, but only as an empty shell. He wants to find Tsubasa to bring her back to life. At the end, he is given a climatic choice by Kayo after seducing Kotobuki for a final time. After Kayo understands how painful and selfish her actions towards Rikuro had been, Hil realizes he had done the same thing, and unplugs Ann. He asks her if he should go on living, and she smiles peacefully at him as she finally dies. The very last panel shows Hil has opened an orphanage and is playing with some nameless children.
Touya Ingram (十夜·イグラム, Tōya Iguramu)
Touya is a major in the army under Hil who is very fond of Raimon. He wants Raimon back in the army, and tries to separate Kotobuki and Raimon to do so. His fondness of Raimon is almost at the level of obsession, although he himself is happily married with a child. He orders private pictures of Raimon, and when a photo of Kotobuki among them he is going to throw it away, but Hil snatches it from him. He is shot by Hil when he disagrees with his goals. He is last seen recovering from his wounds, his daughter and wife nursing him back to health.
Phere Marshel (フィーア·マイシェル, Fīa Maisheru)
Phere is a lieutenant colonel under Hilt. Her trademark weapon is a whip, but she often uses a gun if necessary. She has a crush on Hil, so she feels a little jealousy toward Raimon, whom Hil is obsessed with (in a non-romantic way). She loyally follows every order Hil gives even when her heart seems to be in conflict with it, in the hopes he may someday care even a little for her. She kidnaps Kotobuki to lure Raimon to the border to blow him up, but allows them to escape unharmed and roundaboutly saves the orphanage Kotobuki was protecting from being blown up. She is shown to be compassionate to anti-military supporters early on, and later betrays the military and admits her regrets for her actions. She eventually falls in love with Yan after being used as a hostage, though she continually denies it. They get married at the end of the series.
Yan Mizuchi (ヤン·蛟)
Yan is the leader of anti-army organization known as "the Enemy." His first meeting with Kotobuki was unusual, as he accidentally kisses her. Raimon callously decides to let him die for that, but Kotobuki saves him. He later becomes a great ally for Kotobuki and Raimon. Yan is very young and somewhat naive and innocent, so sometimes acts unconsciously childish- such as playing tag with Ross's maids who are infatuated with him. He is very good-looking. He falls in love with Phere after their first meeting, though he does not realize that it's actually love; he just wants to see her again. Though Phere initially does not return the feelings, she eventually weakens and the end of the series they end up getting married.
Adelaide Wilson (アデリィート·ウィルソン, Aderaīdo Wiruson)
Adelaide (Addie) is a very rich little girl who lives with her airheaded mother in a large mansion. Her father died young, and Adelaide soon takes over the family affairs as her mother has no business sense. She is very intelligent, headstrong, and independent, and can very bratty, but is occasionally insightful. She seems very attached to Kotobuki, and has been following her and the others since their first meeting. She often cruelly teases Shouka. Despite their differences, she and her mother love each very much.
Ross Corpul
Ross Corpul is a effeminate, wealthy man with relations to the army, and he is Raimon's adoptive father. Raimon left his home at young age because his family had too many mouths to feed, and he asked Ross to adopt him; in return, he would "become the best elite and help you do bad things." Intrigued, Ross accepted his offer. Ross claims that Raimon used to throw bombs into his study. Ross often enjoys torturing his son and Kotobuki, and often steals and patents Raimon's inventions. He is quite a cunning lady-killer.
Kayo (花陽, Kayō) and Rikuro (六呂, Rikuro)
Rikuro and Kayo are two mysterious beings shrouded in an enigma only revealed in the final volume. They are two artificial shape-shifting beings containing the two brains of Tsubasa. They are identical twins, and Kayo appears female while Rikuro is male. Rikuro was captured by the military years before, and he was soon wired as 'F'; the mother computer of the military. He appears much sooner in the series then Kayo, as the mysterious friend of Raimon. While Kayo is mostly shrouded in mystery for the series, there are several hints to her identity, particularly regarding the robots Kotobuki, Raimon, Hil, and Shouka encounter, who identify her as 'master'. Though Rikuro emphasizes with humans, particularly Raimon and Kotobuki, despite the military's treatment of him, Kayo ends up hating humanity for taking her brother away from her- her feelings are very similar to Hil's for Ann. Rikuro is ultimately destroyed by the military, to Kayo's fury.
Ann
Ann was in charge of the orphanage Kotobuki lived in until the military burned it down. Little is revealed about her until the end and although she's "dead" for most of the series, her role served as a catalyst and major angst factor. She was Hil's older sister, and he dearly loved her to the point of obsession. She left her family to open an orphanage for the nameless, leaving behind a stricken Hil. Once Hil joined the military, he dedicated a lot of time to trying to find her, and upon finally locating her is overcome by his possessiveness of her and jealousy of the nameless she left him for. He shoots and kills her and all of the orphans, then burns the orphanage down to the ground. Only Kotobuki, who was out getting Ann medicine, survived. Hil then took Ann's body back with him, and connected her to machines which kept her alive as an 'empty shell'. At the very end, Hil regrets his actions and unplugs her from the machines, and she dies smiling.

== Release ==
Written and illustrated by Natsuki Takaya, the chapters of Tsubasa: Those with Wings appeared as a serial in the manga magazine Hana to Yume from the October 1995 issue to the May 1998 issue.

Tokyopop licensed the series for an English-language translation in North America.

=== Volume List ===
Book

- Takaya Natsuki "Those with Wings" Hakusensha <Hana to Yume Comics> 6 volumes (out of print as of July 2010)
1. Released November 1996, ISBN 978-4-592-12831-1
2. Released April 1997, ISBN 978-4-592-12832-8
3. Released October 1997, ISBN 978-4-592-12833-5
4. Released February 1998, ISBN 978-4-592-12834-2
5. Released June 1998, ISBN 978-4-592-12835-9
6. Released August 1998, ISBN 978-4-592-12836-6

Paperback edition

- Takaya Natsuki "Those with Wings" Hakusensha <Hakusensha Bunko> 3 volumes
1. Released January 12, 2007, ISBN 978-4-592-88521-4
2. Released March 15, 2007, ISBN 978-4-592-88522-1
3. Released May 15, 2007, ISBN 978-4-592-88523-8

== Reception ==
The series ranked eighth in About.com's reader poll, tied with Oh My Goddess! Colors, for the 2009 "Best Classic or Reissued Manga". The first volume of the Tokyopop edition debuted at #10 on The New York Times best seller list for manga the week it debuted.

Deb Aoki of About.com placed Tsubasa: Those with Wings on her lists of "Top 10 New Manga from Anime Expo 2008" and "20 Most Anticipated New Manga of 2009". Johanna Draper Carlsen, a reviewer for Publishers Weekly, wrote that the series had some appeal as entertainment for a rainy day; she thought that the Takaya's art was dated as her early work, yet conveyed the story. Publishers Weekly negatively reviewed the first volume, finding the art, characterization, and storyline lacking in comparison to Takaya's later work in Fruits Basket. According to the reviewer, Tsubasa: Those with Wings "lacks the originality and emotional impact of Fruits Basket." The reviewer, however, complimented Tokyopop's decision to translate the bunkoban volumes, instead of the six original volumes.
