= Natsuki Takaya =

Japanese manga artist (born 1973)

- 高屋奈月
- Born: July 7, 1973 (age 53); Shizuoka, Japan
- Occupation: Manga artist
- Writing career
- Language: Japanese
- Years active: 1992–present
- Notable work: Fruits Basket
- Notable awards: Kodansha Manga Award (2001); American Anime Award (2007)

Natsuki Takaya (Japanese: 高屋奈月, Hepburn: Takaya Natsuki; born July 7, 1973) is a Japanese manga artist. She is best known for creating the manga series Fruits Basket, which was serialized in Hana to Yume from 1998 to 2006. The series received a Kodansha Manga Award in the shōjo manga (Note: Shōjo manga is an editorial classification describing Japanese comics aimed at a younger female demographic.) category in 2001 and won the American Anime Awards in the Manga category in 2007.

Takaya began her professional career in 1991 with the short story "Sickly Boy wa Hi ni Yowai". She serialized Phantom Dream and Tsubasa: Those with Wings over the next few years before launching Fruits Basket, which was adapted into an anime television series in 2001. Following the success of Fruits Basket, Takaya focused on keeping her later works true to her own style and voice. She went on to create Twinkle Stars, Liselotte and Witch's Forest, and multiple Fruits Basket spin-off series. In 2019, she served as executive producer for a second anime adaptation of Fruits Basket.

Fruits Basket is one of the best-selling shōjo manga works of all time; by 2018, it had sold more than 30 million copies worldwide. It has been credited with contributing to the popularity of shōjo manga in the United States and has influenced numerous manga artists and other creators.

== Early life ==
Takaya was born in Shizuoka, Japan, on July 7, 1973, and raised in Tokyo. As a child, she often read manga works, which eventually led her to pursue drawing manga as a career. She mentioned that she decided to become a manga artist when she was in first grade; her sister also wanted to be a manga artist during that time, which ended up influencing her. She drew her first manga when she was in grade school.

== Career ==
=== Early works ===
Prior to her debut in the manga scene, Takaya had never formally worked as an assistant nor drawn doujinshi (self-published manga). In 1991, her short story "Sickly Boy wa Hi ni Yowai" (Sickly Boyは陽に弱い, lit. 'Sickly boy is weak in the sun') received an Honorable Mention in the 178th Hana to Yume Manga Artist Course. Later that year, it was published in Hakusensha's Bessatsu Hana to Yume as her first professional work. In 1992, she published the story "Born Free" in Hana to Yume Planet Zōkan.

Shortly after the publication of "Born Free", she began serializing Phantom Dream in Hana to Yume; its chapters were collected into five tankōbon volumes (standalone bound books) released from February 1996 to December 1997. She also serialized Tsubasa: Those with Wings in the same magazine; its chapters were collected into six tankōbon volumes released from November 1996 to August 1998. Between 1993 and 1998, Takaya published several short stories in Hana to Yume and related magazines, which were compiled into a collection titled Songs to Make You Smile that was released in November 1999.

=== Fruits Basket ===
In July 1998, Takaya began serializing Fruits Basket in Hana to Yume. In 2001, Takaya received the Kodansha Manga Award for shōjo manga for the series. An anime adaptation of the series aired from July to December of that year, covering the first six volumes of the manga. Takaya published the final chapter of Fruits Basket in November 2006. In total, Fruits Basket spanned twenty-three tankōbon volumes, alongside two fan books, an artbook, and a character book.

Fruits Basket achieved significant critical and commercial success. By May 2007, it had sold over 18 million copies in Japan and 3 million copies overseas. Its final volume reached the fifteenth position on the USA Today Best-Selling Books list, the highest rank ever reached by a manga work. In 2007, it won the American Anime Awards in the Best Manga category, while in 2008 it was nominated for the Seiun Awards in the Comic category.

=== Twinkle Stars ===
Following the completion of Fruits Basket, Takaya described herself as exhausted both physically and mentally; at one point, she even considered quitting her career. As she felt that she would not be able to create a series surpassing Fruits Basket, she decided to focus on making her future works true to her own style and voice, which began with Twinkle Stars. Takaya published the series in Hana to Yume from June 2007 to January 2011. Its chapters were collected into eleven tankōbon volumes. Following its completion, she called it a work that she was very fond of.

In May 2011, Takaya began serializing Liselotte & Witch's Forest in Hana to Yume. Its chapters have been compiled into five tankōbon volumes, with the most recent being released in November 2013. In December 2013, Takaya announced that the series would be going into extended hiatus so that she could recover from an illness. In July 2015, Takaya stated that she had no plans to resume the series yet, but would try to slowly return. In a December 2015 interview with Comic Natalie, Takaya said that due to her health and various circumstances, she could not work on it simultaneously with another series, but intended to eventually come back to it.

=== Fruits Basket Another and other works ===
In September 2015, Takaya launched a sequel to Fruits Basket titled Fruits Basket Another on Hakusensha's HanaLaLa Online website. The series' twelfth chapter was released in December 2018, with its third volume being released in March 2019 as the planned final one. Takaya initially announced that she would only draw one-shots afterward, but in April 2020, she released a thirteenth chapter of Fruits Basket Another as a "tentative" ending.

Between April and July 2019, Takaya published three chapters of a spin-off series, Fruits Basket: Three Musketeers Arc, in Hana to Yume. She published a three-chapter continuation, styled as a "second season", in the same magazine between April and August 2020. These chapters, along with the thirteenth chapter of Fruits Basket Another, were subsequently compiled into the latter series's fourth and concluding volume.

In April 2019, a second anime adaptation of Fruits Basket began airing. Three seasons were produced in total, with the final season concluding in June 2021. Takaya served as supervisor and executive producer for the series; she requested that the second adaptation be done with a different team from the first one and use an animation style that did not "look too much like [her] art". She mentioned being "happy and honored" that new fans were discovering Fruits Basket through the anime.

In September 2023, Takaya started publishing a new series, In Such a Small World, on Hakusensha's Manga Park website. The series ended in July 2025 with a total of eleven chapters along with a prologue and epilogue.

== Style and views ==
Takaya has said that manga does not have a "firm definition" for her; instead, she prefers to freely interpret the medium. She has also stated that she most enjoys the process of planning and storyboarding a manga series. During this process, she described the pacing, dialogue, and emotional interest to the reader as the most important aspects to focus on. In a 2006 interview with Time magazine, she mentioned that she had two assistants. Although she did not teach them any particular style, she described them as a "great help" to her.

In a Q&A in the third volume of Fruits Basket, Takaya said that she mostly worked "all day long" except for meals. She felt her greatest challenge was conveying the story within a limited page count, and she would talk with her editor or take a break when she got stuck.

Takaya has stated that she enjoys "work that [she] could never draw [her]self", such as CSI: Crime Scene Investigation. She felt that her ideas generally come from her doubts and desires rather than any specific inspirations. For Fruits Basket, she said that the storyline was simply "something that occurs to me, through the process of living for myself". She also stated that when she creates a character, she focuses on what they care about, their convictions, and their upbringing, with every character she makes being based on herself to some extent.

Takaya typically tries to include a message in her works, saying that she prefers providing "conclusions" over ending with "questions". For particularly heavy topics, she aims to simply depict them "as they are." She prefers not to comment on this message outside of what is shown in the story; in her opinion, each reader's unique interpretation is "part of the pleasure" of enjoying a work.

== Influence ==
Fruits Basket is one of the best-selling shōjo manga series of all time. The final English-language volume was a New York Times manga bestseller, ranking first during the week of July 19–25. By November 2018, the series had sold over 30 million copies worldwide.

Akiko Sugawa-Shimada, a professor researching anime and manga at Yokohama National University, wrote that Fruits Basket made a "significant cultural impact" and contributed to the popularity of shōjo manga in the United States, particularly as existing American comics were typically targeted towards male readers. Heidi MacDonald, a writer working in the comics industry, described it as "one of the greatest hits of the First Manga Era". Joanna Carlson, a former writer for Publishers Weekly, said that Fruits Basket "demonstrated the potential value of the manga market in North America" and "showed how much of a buying force female readers could be."

Domee Shi, director of the movie Turning Red, credited Fruits Basket as one of her inspirations, particularly in how it incorporated magical elements with "playfulness and looseness". Mengo Yokoyari, a manga artist known for drawing Oshi no Ko and Scum's Wish, named Fruits Basket as a work that influenced her, and praised Takaya's art style and composition as well as her portrayals of characters. Other professional manga artists have been influenced by Takaya's work, including Waka Hirako (My Broken Mariko), Aya Fumino (Muse no Shinzui), and Tina Yamashina (Shōjo Koi).

== Personal life ==
Takaya has mentioned liking game music as well as the movies Field of Dreams and Laputa: Castle in the Sky. She enjoys playing video games, naming Sakura Wars as one of her favorites.

During Fruits Basket's serialization, Takaya developed occupational dystonia, which she received surgery to treat. Following a hiatus of one year, she returned to working on the series, though she noted that her art style had changed. Later, when announcing her hiatus from Liselotte & Witch's Forest for health reasons, she clarified that it was not a recurrence of the issue.

== Works ==
All works were originally published in Japanese by Hakusensha.

=== Manga ===
All dates are for the publication of the original tankōbon volumes unless otherwise specified.

- Phantom Dream (幻影夢想, Genei Musō) (5 volumes, 1996–1997)
- Tsubasa: Those with Wings (翼を持つ者, Tsubasa o Motsu Mono) (6 volumes, 1996–1998)
- Songs to Make You Smile (僕が唄うと君は笑うから, Boku ga Utau to Kimi wa Warau kara) (1 volume, 1999)
- Fruits Basket (フルーツバスケット, Furūtsu Basuketto) (23 volumes, 1999–2007)
- Twinkle Stars (星は歌う, Hoshi wa Utau) (11 volumes, 2008–2011)
- Liselotte & Witch's Forest (リーゼロッテと魔女の森, Rīzerotte to Majo no Mori) (5 volumes, 2012–2013) (Note: On extended hiatus.)
- Fruits Basket Another (フルーツバスケットanother, Furūtsu Basuketto Anazā) (4 volumes, 2016–2022)
- Fruits Basket: Three Musketeers Arc (フルーツバスケット: マブダチ特別編, Furūtsu Basuketto: Mabudachi Tokubetsu-hen) (Online, 2019–2020) (Note: The series' chapters were included in Fruits Basket Another's final volume.)
- In Such a Small World (かくも小さき世界にて, Kakumo Chiisaki Sekai nite) (Online, 2023–2025)

=== Other titles ===
- Takaya Natsuki "Furūtsu Basuketto" Kyarakutā Bukku (高屋奈月「フルーツバスケット」キャラクターブック, lit. 'Takaya Natsuki "Fruits Basket" Character Book') (2001)
- Takaya Natsuki Gashū Furūtsu Basuketto (高屋奈月画集フルーツバスケット, lit. 'Takaya Natsuki Illustration Collection Fruits Basket') (2004)
- Fruits Basket Fan Book – Cat (フルーツバスケットファンブック〈猫〉, Furūtsu Basuketto Fan Bukku (Neko)) (2005)
- Fruits Basket Fan Book – Banquet (フルーツバスケットファンブック/宴, Furūtsu Basuketto Fan Bukku /En) (2007)
