= Fruits Basket =

Japanese manga series and its adaptations

- First tankōbon volume cover, featuring Tohru Honda

フルーツバスケット (Furūtsu Basuketto)
- Genre: Romantic comedy; Slice of life; Supernatural
- Manga
- Written by: Natsuki Takaya
- Published by: Hakusensha
- English publisher: AUS: Madman Entertainment; NA: Tokyopop (former); Yen Press (current); SG: Chuang Yi; UK: Tokyopop (former)
- Imprint: Hana to Yume Comics
- Magazine: Hana to Yume
- Original run: 18 July 1998 – 20 November 2006
- Volumes: 23
- Anime television series
- Directed by: Akitaro Daichi
- Written by: Higuchi Tachibana
- Studio: Studio Deen
- Licensed by: Crunchyroll (Note: In North America through Crunchyroll, LLC (formerly known as Funimation).); AUS: Madman Entertainment; SA / SEA: Mighty Media
- Original network: TV Tokyo
- English network: AU: ABC3; US: Funimation Channel
- Original run: 5 July 2001 – 27 December 2001
- Episodes: 26
- Anime television series
- Directed by: Yoshihide Ibata
- Written by: Taku Kishimoto
- Music by: Masaru Yokoyama
- Studio: TMS/8PAN
- Licensed by: Crunchyroll; SA / SEA: Mighty Media
- Original network: TV Tokyo, TVO, TVA, AT-X
- English network: AU: ABC Me; SEA: Animax Asia
- Original run: 6 April 2019 – 29 June 2021
- Episodes: 63
- Manga

Fruits Basket: The Three Musketeers Arc
- Written by: Natsuki Takaya
- Published by: Hakusensha
- English publisher: NA: Yen Press
- Magazine: Hana to Yume
- Original run: 20 April 2019 – 5 July 2019
- Manga

Fruits Basket: The Three Musketeers Arc 2
- Written by: Natsuki Takaya
- Published by: Hakusensha
- English publisher: NA: Yen Press
- Magazine: Hana to Yume
- Original run: 20 April 2020 – 5 August 2020
- Anime film
- Fruits Basket: Prelude (2022)
- Other
- Fruits Basket Another (sequel)
- icon

Fruits Basket (Japanese: フルーツバスケット, Hepburn: Furūtsu Basuketto (Note: Sometimes abbreviated Furuba or Fruba (フルバ))) is a Japanese manga series written and illustrated by Natsuki Takaya. It was serialized in the semi-monthly shōjo manga magazine Hana to Yume, published by Hakusensha, from 1998 to 2006. The series' title comes from the name of a popular game played in Japanese elementary schools, which is alluded to in the series.

Fruits Basket tells the story of Tohru Honda, an orphan girl who, after meeting Yuki, Kyo, and Shigure Sohma, learns that 13 members of the Sohma family are possessed by the animals of the Chinese zodiac and are cursed to turn into their animal forms when they are weak, stressed, or embraced by anyone of the opposite gender who is not possessed by a spirit of the zodiac. As the series progresses, Tohru learns of the hardships and pain faced by the afflicted members of the Sohma family, and through her own generous and loving nature, helps heal their emotional wounds. As she learns more about Yuki, Kyo, and the rest of the mysterious Sohma family, Tohru also learns more about herself and how much others care for her.

Takaya began a sequel titled Fruits Basket Another in September 2015, and a spin-off series titled The Three Musketeers Arc in April 2019. The original manga was adapted into a 2001 anime television series with 26 episodes, produced by Studio Deen and directed by Akitaro Daichi. A second anime television series adaptation, produced by TMS Entertainment and directed by Yoshihide Ibata, aired three seasons from April to September 2019, April to September 2020, and April to June 2021, respectively. A compilation film titled Fruits Basket: Prelude premiered theatrically in Japan in February 2022.

Fruits Basket won the 2001 Kodansha Manga Awards in the shōjo category and the "Best Manga" award at the 2007 American Anime Awards. By December 2018, the manga had over 30 million copies in circulation, making it one of the best-selling manga series of all time. It has been described in academic works as "a classic fan favorite in shōjo manga around the world", and has contributed to the popularity of shōjo manga in the United States. Both the 2001 and 2019 anime adaptations have been well received, with the latter winning "Best Drama" at the 5th Crunchyroll Anime Awards.

== Plot ==
When high school student Tohru Honda's mother dies in a car accident, Tohru is taken in by her grandfather. A few months later, her grandfather decides to remodel his house and asks Tohru if she can stay with one of her friends until it is finished. Not wanting to impose on her two best friends, Tohru buys a tent and begins living in a forest near her school.

While exploring one day, Tohru discovers a nearby home where her popular classmate Yuki Sohma lives with his cousin Shigure. Soon after, a landslide destroys her tent and the Sohmas invite Tohru to move into their house. As Yuki and Shigure show Tohru her new room, they are interrupted by Kyo Sohma, Yuki and Shigure's cousin, who crashes through the ceiling and challenges Yuki to a fight.

Tohru tries to stop him, and—accidentally falling into him—causes him to transform into a cat in front of her, discovering the Sohma family curse; that twelve members of the family, excluding Kyo, are possessed by the spirits of the Chinese zodiac (十二支, Jūnishi), and turn into their zodiac animal when they are weak, under stress, embarrassed, or when hugged by someone of the opposite gender. Kyo is possessed by the cat who was excluded from the zodiac, and is cursed to be similarly bullied and abused by the clan.

When Tohru discovers the Sohma family secret, she promises not to tell anyone, and is allowed to keep living with them. Although the Sohma curse stretches far deeper and darker than Tohru initially thinks, her presence and her acceptance of them soon become a large, positive influence on those possessed by the zodiac. She sets out to break the curse and, on the way, meets and discovers the Sohma's vengeful zodiac spirits, including their leader, Akito, who occupies the position of "God" in the Chinese legend, and who both keeps the family together and chains them to their spirits.

== Production ==
The title of the series is taken from a children's game, Fruits Basket, in which the participants sit in a circle, and the leader of the game names each person after a type of fruit; when the name of a child's fruit is called, that child gets up and has to find a new seat. When the protagonist, Tohru Honda, first plays this game in kindergarten, she is not given a fruit, and is instead assigned "onigiri" by her classmates, who do not want her to play. However, Tohru, thinking that onigiri are delicious, does not realise that her classmates are intentionally leaving her out of the game; once the game is finished, and all of the children but Tohru have been called, Tohru realizes that onigiri are not a type of fruit at all, and she realizes that she does not belong.

Tohru comes to associate this game with the Sohma family, and that she does not fit in among them any more than an onigiri does in a basket of fruit. In volume 1 of the manga, after Yuki and Kyo bring Tohru home from her grandfather's house, she begins to feel like she belongs with the Sohma family; after this, she imagines herself as a child hearing "onigiri" called in the game, symbolizing that she has finally found her place.

Natsuki Takaya named most of the twelve Sohmas cursed by zodiac animals after archaic names of month in the former Japanese lunisolar calendar that correspond to their zodiac animal. The exceptions are Kureno and Momiji, whose names were swapped by mistake; Kyo, as the cat, is not part of the official zodiac, and so does not follow these naming conventions. Yuki's name also does not follow this naming convention, since Takaya came up with it before deciding the other names.

== Media ==
=== Manga ===
The 136 chapters of Fruits Basket were serialized by Hakusensha in Hana to Yume from July 1998 to November 2006. These were collected into 23 tankōbon volumes released from 19 January 1999 to 19 March 2007. On 4 September 2015, the first two volumes of Fruits Basket: Collector's Edition (愛蔵版 フルーツバスケット, Aizōban Furūtsu Basuketto) were released in Japan under the Hana to Yume Comics Special imprint. The 12th and last volume was published on 20 July 2016.

The series is licensed in English in North America and the United Kingdom by Tokyopop and in Singapore by Chuang Yi. The Singapore edition is licensed to be imported to Australia and New Zealand by Madman Entertainment. All 23 English-language volumes have been released in North America and Singapore. In addition, Tokyopop released a box set containing the first four volumes in October 2007, and started re-releasing earlier volumes in "Ultimate Editions" combining two sequential volumes in a single larger hard-cover volume with new cover art. The first volume met with mixed reviews. Six volumes were released.

After Tokyopop ceased publication, the series was re-licensed by Yen Press, with plans to release it as twelve omnibus editions corresponding Hakusensha's collector's editions. Starting in June 2016, Fruits Basket: Collector's Edition was released in English by Yen Press.

==== Spin-offs ====
On 4 September 2015, a new series, Fruits Basket Another, began serialization in HanaLaLaOnline. In August 2017, it was transferred to Manga Park. Originally, it was announced that Fruits Basket Another would be finished on 3 December 2018, however, in March 2020, it was announced that the series would return with a "chapter 13" (released in three parts) on 20 April 2020. The second part of "chapter 13" was published on 4 May 2020 and the third part of "chapter 13" was published in September 2020; Takaya announced that this would "tentatively" be the manga's last chapter. The first collected volume was published on 19 August 2016. The series finished with its fourth volume, released on 18 February 2022. In November 2017, Yen Press announced the acquisition of the manga.

A three-chapter series, titled Fruits Basket: Three Musketeers Arc (フルーツバスケット：マブダチ特別編, Furūtsu Basuketto Mabudachi Tokubetsu-hen) was published in Hana to Yume on 20 April, 5 June and 5 July 2019. A "second season" began on 20 April 2020. The second chapter was published on 20 June. The third and final chapter was published on 5 August 2020. The chapters were collected in the fourth volume of Fruits Basket Another. Yen Press digitally simulpublished the series.

=== Anime (2001) ===
Directed by Akitaro Daichi, the twenty-six episode Fruits Basket anime series was animated by Studio Deen and produced by NAS and TV Tokyo. It premiered on TV Tokyo on 5 July 2001, with the final episode airing on 27 December 2001. Some parts of the plot deviated from the manga and were portrayed differently. The opening and ending themes were performed by Ritsuko Okazaki. The opening theme is "For Fruits Basket" (performed by Meredith McCoy in the English dub version). The first ending theme is "Chiisana Inori" (小さな祈り; lit. 'Small Prayer') (performed by Laura Bailey in the English dub). The second ending theme is "Serenade" (performed by Daphne Gere in the English dub).

The series was released in Japan in nine individual DVD volumes by King Records, with each volume containing three episodes except for the first volume, which contained two. The first volume was released on 29 September 2001, with subsequent volumes released on a monthly basis until the final one on 22 May 2002. A series box set was released on 25 April 2007, containing all twenty-six episodes as well a message card from Natsuki Takaya, a 60-page deluxe booklet, and a bonus CD soundtrack.

Funimation aired the series with their English dub on the Funimation Channel as well as on Colours TV and also licensed it for Region 1 DVD release. It released it in the form of four individual volumes containing 6–7 episodes and a complete series box set. On 20 November 2007, Funimation re-released the series, doing so again on 1 August 2017 on an upscaled Blu-ray. In the United Kingdom, Funimation originally distributed the series through MVM Entertainment, but changed distributors in November 2006 to Revelation Films. Revelation re-released the four individual volumes under their label. They also released the series box set on 22 January 2007. MVM re-licensed the series in late 2011. In Region 4, the series was released as a complete series box set by Madman Entertainment on 15 October 2003.

=== Anime (2019) ===
A new anime adaptation was announced in November 2018. It featured a new cast and staff, per Takaya's request, with TMS Entertainment handling production. Yoshihide Ibata directed the series, with Taku Kishimoto handling series composition and Masaru Shindou handling character designs. The first season ran for 25 episodes from 6 April to 21 September 2019, on TV Tokyo, TV Osaka, and TV Aichi. The first opening theme for episodes 1–13 is "Again" by Beverly. The second opening theme for episodes 14–25 is "Chime" by Ai Otsuka. The first ending theme for episodes 1–13 is "Lucky Ending" by Vickeblanka. The second ending theme for episodes 14–25 is "One Step Closer" by Intersection.

A second season aired from 7 April to 22 September 2020. The third opening theme for episodes 26–38 is "Prism" by AmPm ft Miyuna. The fourth opening theme for episodes 39 onwards is "Home" by Toki Asako. The third ending theme for episodes 26–38 is "ad meliora (acoustic mix)" by The Charm Park. The fourth ending theme for episodes 39 onwards is "Eden" by Monkey Majik.

A third and final season, titled Fruits Basket: The Final, aired from 6 April to 29 June 2021. The fifth opening theme is "Pleasure", by Warps Up, and the fifth ending theme is "Haru Urara" by Genic.

The reboot is a co-production of Funimation, which released the series through Crunchyroll-Funimation partnership. Mighty Media licensed the series in Asia-Pacific and is streaming it on Netflix and Animax Asia. Funimation has also licensed the series for home video distribution. The English dub features many of the English voice actors that voiced in the first Fruits Basket series. Crunchyroll streamed the English-subtitled version, while Funimation streamed the English-dubbed version. In March 2020, Funimation announced that the SimulDub production would be delayed internationally due to the COVID-19 pandemic. The SimulDub's was later resumed as scheduled starting with Season 3. Following Sony's acquisition of Crunchyroll, the series was fully moved under Crunchyroll. Funimation's English dub of the anime began airing in Australia on ABC Me on 19 June 2020.

==== Compilation film ====
The 2019 series received a compilation film titled Fruits Basket: Prelude, which premiered theatrically in Japan on 18 February 2022. It recaps the 2019 anime series, and includes a prequel episode titled Kyо̄ko to Katsuya no Monogatari that focuses on Tohru's parents, and an original story written by Takaya set after the series. The film's theme song is "Niji to Kite" ("Rainbow and Kite") by Ohashi Trio. The film had a 3-day theatrical release with both a subbed and a dubbed version starting on 25 June 2022 in the United States and Canada. Additionally, the film had a 1-day release with the English dub only in the United Kingdom on 20 July 2022. Crunchyroll distributed both versions.

=== Other media ===
In 1999, the magazine Hana to Yume released a special Fruits Basket drama CD which had a four-chapter original story and short talk sections between each section. Released before the anime came out, this CD had a completely different voice cast. The CD is now unavailable. As well as the drama CD, there have been two music CD releases of Fruits Basket to coincide with the anime adaptation, Memory for You and Four Seasons (also known as Song for Ritsuko Okazaki).

Natsuki Takaya has created one art book and two fan books for Fruits Basket. The art book, containing 101 pages of illustrations, was published by Hakusensha on 16 April 2004. The first fan book, Fruits Basket Fan Book – Cat (フルーツバスケットファンブック〈猫〉, Furūtsu Basuketto Fan Bukku (Neko)), which contained 192 pages of story summaries, character biographies, and activities, was published in Japan on 19 May 2005. Tokyopop released it in English on 11 September 2007. The second fan book, Fruits Basket Fan Book – Banquet (フルーツバスケットファンブック/宴, Furūtsu Basuketto Fan Bukku /En), was published in Japan on 19 March 2007 and contained 187 pages; it was published in English by Tokyopop on 27 April 2010.

Fruits Basket has also resulted in the creation of a variety of merchandise, including plushies of the various zodiac animals, wall calendars, clothing items, key chains, wall scrolls, buttons, figurines, and school supplies. A collectible card game based on the series was released by Score Entertainment which can be used for playing Dai Hin Min as well as other games. On 5 July 2022, during Anime Expo 2022, Crunchyroll announced that the series would get a collaboration with the famous Hello Kitty franchise, which debuted in August 2022.

In 2008, the all-male theatrical troupe Gekidan Studio Life announced it would produce a theatrical adaptation of Fruits Basket, using only performers who would be making their stage debuts. The production ran for two weeks at the Galaxy Theater in Tokyo starting 25 February 2009. Another stage play adaptation titled Fruits Basket The Stage ran from 4–13 March 2022 at Tokyo's Nihonbashi Mitsui Hall. A sequel to the stage play ran from 6–15 October 2023. A stage play titled Fruits Basket Stage: The Final ran from 18 to 27 October 2024 at Hulic Hall Tokyo.

== Reception ==
=== Sales ===
Fruits Basket is one of the top-selling manga series in both Japan and in the US. More than 18 million copies have been sold in Japan, and 30 million copies worldwide. It is Tokyopop's best selling manga series, with more than 2 million copies sold by 2006. The fifteenth volume of the English release rose to the fifteenth position on the USA Today Top 150 Bestselling Books, the highest position ever achieved by a volume of manga in the United States. The eighteenth volume debuted at the top of the Nielsen BookScan sales list, while the nineteenth volume was the second-bestselling graphic novel in March 2008. Despite a slow manga market, Fruits Basket remained the second-highest overall selling manga series among the Bookscan companies in 2007.

The final volume of the English adaptation was a New York Times manga bestseller from 28 June through 25 July, moving from second to first in the list in the week of 19–25 July. The volume dropped back down to second place the following week, then dropped to fourth place in the week of 8 August. The final volume remained on the best seller list for 12 weeks.

=== Accolades ===
The Fruits Basket manga received the 2001 Kodansha Manga Award in the shōjo category and the "Best Manga" award at the 2007 American Anime Awards. In 2008, it was nominated for the Seiun Awards in the Comic category. In 2026, Yen Press's box set won the Best Publication Design category at the third annual American Manga Awards.

The first Fruits Basket anime won Animage's 2001 Anime Grand Prix award. In February 2002, it ranked third in Anihabara's list of top televised anime series in Japan. In the June 2002 issue of Animage magazine, it placed first in a list of the best twenty anime series in Japan. In 2006, it ranked 93rd in TV Asahi's list of Japan's 100 favorite animated TV series.

At the 4th Crunchyroll Anime Awards in 2020, the new anime was nominated in three categories including Best Drama; its second season won Best Drama while Akito Soma was nominated for Best Antagonist at the fifth edition. The final season was nominated in four categories including Best Drama and Best Romance at the sixth edition. In February 2022, Fruits Basket: The Final won three awards, including "Anime of the Year", at the 8th Anime Trending Awards.

=== Cultural influence ===
In April 2005, Funimation Entertainment started a project calling for convention attendees to help them fold 1,000 origami paper cranes. In Japanese folklore, folding 1,000 paper cranes grants someone a wish. When it had over 1,000 cranes, Funimation sent the cranes and pictures of the events to Studio Deen and Hakusensha to try to convince the company to produce a second season ofFruits Basket. Fans successfully folded the required 1,000 cranes by the end of the 2005 convention season, marking the beginning of a 13-year gap that culminated in the announcement of the new Fruits Basket anime in 2018.

Akiko Sugawa-Shimada, a professor researching anime and manga at Yokohama National University, wrote that Fruits Basket made a "significant cultural impact" and contributed to the popularity of shōjo manga in the United States, particularly as existing American comics were typically targeted towards male readers. Heidi MacDonald, a writer working in the comics industry, described it as "one of the greatest hits of the First Manga Era". Joanna Carlson of Comics Worth Reading opined that Fruits Basket "demonstrated the potential value of the manga market in North America" and "showed how much of a buying force female readers could be."

=== Critical reception ===
==== Manga ====
Critics have praised the overall story in Fruits Basket as being intellectual, with even the relatively light-hearted first volume giving hints at something darker in the background that makes the reader "question everything that happens." Some felt the series was getting close to overloading readers with angst in later volumes, and questioned the credulity of the sheer number of bad parents in the series. As one reviewer noted: "in the world of Fruits Basket, good parents are as common as penguins in the Sahara—every single one is either neglectful, smothering, unfeeling, abusive, misguided, or dead."

As this title progresses the fact that this title was one of the more popular series in Japan becomes clear. The characters get a lot of love. You get to experience them when things are good, as well as when they are struggling. The pacing is perfect. There is a good mix of comedy, fun filler, drama and action (something for everyone). In addition Fruits Basket is easy to relate to. With all the different personalities and the different signs of the zodiac, there is always someone to associate with. There are few titles that can do all that well, Fruits Basket puts all of these aspects together and makes a tasty treat ...

— Eduardo M. Chavez, AnimeOnDVD.com

Takaya's artwork in particular has been praised by critics, with Takaya's skills in detailed art, shadowing, and shading lauded as able to convey the character's moods and emotions without the character having any dialogue at all.

The real strength of Natsuki Takaya's artwork isn't that that it looks good—though it definitely does, from its beautiful characters to the intricately rendered textures of their clothing—but how well it communicates mood and emotions. Not content to rely on facial expressions, though she does them well, Takaya is particularly apt at using shading and shadows to indicate character's mental states ... The details of character's emotions—the disparity between Tohru's private emotions and her public front, the punishing intensity of Kyo's feelings for Tohru—are not only discernable but tangible, all without a word being spoken.

— Carl Kimlinger, Anime News Network

In Manga: The Complete Guide, Jason Thompson gave the manga three and a half out of four stars. While finding the series to be "surprisingly sad" and praising the well-defined characters, he felt the series was "neither particularly well drawn nor incredibly witty". As a whole, he considered it "a fascinating manga, like a sweet, melancholy dream." A factor in the success of Fruits Basket in English-speaking countries was that the books were being sold in bookstores, rather than comic book shops, which are considered to be a predominantly male domain.

==== Anime (2001) ====
Animerica reviewers felt the anime adaptation was similar to Ranma ½ in terms of premise and its using a similar musical score. Julie Davis found the characters to be "superficially pretty" and "so-clean-they-look-almost-like-paper-cutouts" with "really, really gigantic eyes", though she notes that the animal alter forms of the zodiac members were "cute and cuddly". Fellow reviewer Urian Brown disagreed, stating that "the characters are designed in a sleek stylish manner that is classy" and felt the animation was "refined". Though it only covers part of the manga, critics felt the ending brought the story to a good stopping point while making it clear that there was much left for the Sohma and Tohru to deal with, including the curse and Tohru's future choice between Kyo and Yuki. Though some felt the plot was lacking in development, they also praised the series for the strength of its character relationships. Allen Divers of Anime News Network called the series a "true emotional roller coaster" which hides "truly deep and heartfelt drama" behind humor, adding that the show explores many "aspects of emotion."

==== Anime (2019) ====
The 2019 version has also received a positive reception. Thrillist listed the 2019 Fruits Basket series among the best anime of the 2010s. Lauren Orsini of Anime News Network praised the series' emotional atmosphere, animation style, music, and voice acting, naming it the best anime of Spring 2019.
