= Sasane =

Japanese singer (born 2007)

Sasane 楽音
- Born: 8 August 2007 (age 19)
- Origin: Yokosuka, Kanagawa, Japan
- Genre: J-pop
- Occupation: Singer
- Instruments: Vocals; guitar
- Years active: 2025–present

Sasane (楽音; born 8 August 2007) is a Japanese singer, TikToker, and model. She started posting acoustic guitar covers on TikTok in 2025, before her song "Mosi Mosi?", released in 2026, went viral, topping the Billboard Japan Heatseekers Songs chart.

== Biography ==
Sasane, a native of Yokosuka, was born on 8 August 2007, and began her modeling career in 2020. She has worked as a model for Ginza, Karimoku Furniture, Uniqlo, and others.

Sasane began posting music on TikTok in March 2025, with her first content being acoustic guitar covers of songs; she covered music by Akasick, Creep Hyp, Hanae, Radwimps, Shinsei Kamattechan, Sōtaisei Riron, and Seiko Oomori, as well as the song "Summertime". She secretly starting going into music after her mother told her to master one thing, waiting until "[she] had some results to show for it, then surprise her by saying 'Look what I did!'". She also stated that as she decided to become an artist due to her growing overseas audience. She had reached 500,000 followers by April 2026.

On 22 April 2026, Sasane released her first original song, "Mosi Mosi?". The song spread through TikTok and became a viral hit globally, primarily Japan and South Korea. In May 2026, she made her first in-person performance at a Seoul girls' school. In June 2026, she gave her first interview on Nippon Television's Viral Artist series.

In July 2026, Sasane released "Otukare", an acoustic pop song which appeared on 150,000 TikTok videos, as a digital single. In August 2026, she made her first appearance on The First Take, performing a remix of "Mosi Mosi?" with KiiiKiii's Leesol. In November 2026, she released a third digital single, an electropop love song named "Zurui", and appeared with Ayumu Nakajima and Yuno Nagao in a SoftBank Group commercial featuring a variant of "Mosi Mosi?".

Sankei Sports described Sasane as "definitely an artist to watch", stating that "her cool, striking appearance, combined with a husky yet cute voice that leaves a lasting impression" allowed her to amass a large amount of social media followers. Writing for Sound & Recording Magazine, Kin Nakagawa said that Sasane's "singing style really brings that Shibuya-kei aesthetic to mind". Yukako Yajima of Billboard Japan called her "blunt-cut-bangs" hairstyle a signature aspect that broadened her appeal to global audiences.

== Personal life ==
Sasane graduated from high school in March 2026. As of June 2026, she was attending a vocational school specializing in jewellery design. Her stage name is her real name.

== Discography ==
Title	Year	Peak chart positions	
Title	Year	JPN Hot	JPN HS
"Mosi Mosi?" (stylized in low-caps)	2026	— (Note: "Mosi Mosi?" did not enter the chart, but was #1 on the Billboard Japan Heatseekers Songs chart.)	13
"Otukare" (stylized in low-caps)	2026	—	—
"Zurui" (stylized in low-caps)	2026	—	—
"—" denotes releases that did not chart or were not released in that region.
