= List of Kamisama Kiss episodes =

Kamisama Kiss is a 2012 Japanese anime television series based on the manga series of the same name written and illustrated by Julietta Suzuki. The anime was produced by TMS Entertainment and directed by Akitaro Daichi. It ran from October 1, 2012, to December 24, 2012, on TV Tokyo. The opening theme is "Kamisama Hajimemashita" (神様はじめました; lit. 'I became a God') and the ending theme "Kamisama Onegai" (神様お願; lit. 'Please, God'), both performed by Hanae. The 17th issue of Hakusensha's Hana to Yume magazine announced in August 2014 that the manga series inspired a second anime season, which aired from January 5, 2015, to March 30, 2015. The opening theme is "Kamisama no Kamisama" (神様の神様; lit. 'God of God') and the ending theme "Ototoi Oide" (おとといおいで; lit. 'Come Another Day'), both once again performed by Hanae.

There are two OVA episodes, which first aired on August 26, 2013, bundled with the 16th volume of the manga. One of the included episodes is based on the story from the 15th volume, while the other contains an all-new original story. A four-part original animation DVD (OAD) known as "Kako-hen" (過去篇; lit. 'Past Arc') began airing on August 20, 2015, and is based on the "past arc" of the series, spanning from the 14th through 17th volumes of the manga series. A new OAD, previously announced as Kamisama, Kekkon Zenya, released as Kamisama, Shiawase ni Naru was bundled with the Kamisama Hajimemashita 25.5 official fanbook on December 20, 2016.

The anime has been licensed for streaming and home video by Crunchyroll LLC, formerly known as Funimation Entertainment.

== Series overview ==
Season	Episodes	Japanese airdates	
Season	Episodes	First aired	Last aired
1	13	October 1, 2012	December 24, 2012
2	12	January 5, 2015	March 30, 2015

== Episode list ==
=== Season 1 (2012) ===
No.	Title	Directed by	Written by	Original release date
1	"Nanami Becomes a God"; Transliteration: "Nanami, Kamisama ni Naru" (Japanese: 奈々生、神様になる)	Yasuichiro Yamamoto	Akitaro Daichi	October 1, 2012
Nanami Momozono, a human high school student, is homeless after being evicted from her apartment after her father ran away from his gambling debts. While sitting in a park she shoos away a dog harassing a man named Mikage, who, after hearing her circumstances, gives her a map to his home and leaves her with a wave and a kiss on the forehead. The home turns out to be a rundown shrine, where a fox yokai named Tomoe is angry that Mikage, the Land God of the shrine, who has been gone for twenty years, has given Nanami the deity mark of the Land God by kissing her forehead, making her the new Land God of the Shrine. Tomoe refuses to serve Nanami and leaves in frustration. The next day, Onikiri and Kotetsu, Tomoe's two shrine spirits, tell Nanami all the duties of a Land God which Tomoe previously had to do alone, including keeping written records of human prayers. Onikiri and Kotetsu bring her to the World Over Yonder to see Tomoe, but she decides to leave after hearing him express his disinterest in the shrine. On the way back to the shrine, after Nanami manages to slip past three demons, thanks to Onikiri and Kotetsu, a demon hag begins chasing her in a forest. In order to be saved from this demon, Nanami forcefully kisses Tomoe to form a contract, forever binding him as her familiar.
2	"The God Becomes a Target"; Transliteration: "Kamisama, Nerawareru" (Japanese: 神様、ねらわれる)	Naoki Hishikawa	Akitaro Daichi	October 8, 2012
When Nanami wakes up, Tomoe tells her that she can increase her divine power by being a matchmaker and answering prayers. Nanami is excited when news spreads that pop star Shinjūrō Kurama is a transfer student at her school. However, Tomoe only allows her to go to school under the condition that she wears a hood to conceal the deity mark on her forehead which, while being invisible to humans, is fully visible to other gods and spirits seeking to steal her divine power. To make matters worse, Nanami learns that Kurama is a jerk and becomes depressed, much to Tomoe's worry. At lunchtime, Nanami is framed for stealing Kurama's money, until Tomoe makes a grand entrance in front of the other students, clearing her name and serving her lunch. The next day at school, deciding not to wear the hood, Nanami is approached by Kurama, but she turns him down. He later calls her up to the school roof to question her negative attitude towards him, causing her to leave in disgust. Tomoe, soon realizing that Kurama is a crow tengu yokai who seeks to replace Nanami as Land God, manages to wound his face, turns him into an ostrich and chases him through the hallways. When Nanami finds out about this, she orders Tomoe to revert Kurama back to normal. She treats Kurama's wound, telling him that he should always look his best in front of all the girls.
3	"The God Makes a Match"; Transliteration: "Kamisama, En o Musubu" (Japanese: 神様、縁をむすぶ)	Yūsuke Onoda	Akitaro Daichi	October 15, 2012
Himemiko of the Swamp, the Imperial Priestess who is a catfish yokai, comes to pay respect to Nanami, which Tomoe disallows. This leads Tomoe to argue with Aotake, Himemiko's familiar, prompting Nanami to intervene between the two. Nanami stops Tomoe by use of sacred word binding, which forces Tomoe to obey against his will. Himemiko requests Nanami to help her reconnect with a human boy named Kotarō Urashima, who she met ten years ago at Lake Isara near a park, and despite Tomoe saying that it is forbidden for a yokai to love a human, Nanami still promises to help Himemiko. The next day, Nanami and Tomoe go to town to look for Kotarō, finding him employed at a restaurant. Nanami later manages to persuade Kotarō to meet with Himemiko in the park. The following afternoon, Tomoe transforms Himemiko to look like a human girl and send her to the park, where Kotarō has Himemiko play with his Rubik's Cube while he leaves to buy sodas. However, when Himemiko is bullied by two boys, Nanami discreetly boosts Kotarō using a white talisman she places on a tree, which gives him the courage to save Himemiko.
4	"The God is Kidnapped"; Transliteration: "Kamisama, Kadowakasareru" (Japanese: 神様、拐かされる)	Yoshitaka Koyama	Akitaro Daichi	October 22, 2012
Nanami saves a white snake from being assaulted by her classmates at school, but it leaves a mark of betrothal on her wrist when she lets it outside. When Tomoe finds out, he goes to school with her because he does not want her to be kidnapped. After finishing the shift to fill up the class daybook, Nanami goes off first because Tomoe fell asleep, but she is kidnapped by Mizuki, the white snake who is actually a yokai and former familiar, and takes her to his shrine in hopes of marrying her. After she realizes that she cannot leave the premises of the shrine, she decides to rest there, hoping that Tomoe will rescue her. Nanami later learns that Yonomori Mitsuha, the Water God of the shrine, died years ago. Nanami refuses to stay with Mizuki, but when Mizuki tries to make a move on her, Tomoe comes to rescue her and burns down the shrine. However, Nanami stops Tomoe from burning down the Yonomori's plum tree, which is precious to Mizuki. Before Nanami and Tomoe head back to their shrine, Nanami promises to see Mizuki again when he feels lonely.
5	"The God Loses Her Home"; Transliteration: "Kamisama, Ie o Ushinau" (Japanese: 神様、家をうしなう)	Chika Nagaoka	Akitaro Daichi	October 29, 2012
Narukami, the God of Thunder, who has always wanted Tomoe to be her familiar, is distraught upon learning that a mere human like Nanami is the new Land God. In order to claim Tomoe for herself, Narukami tracks Nanami to the school, steals Nanami's deity mark and transforms Tomoe into a child. When Kurama finds Nanami and Tomoe outside, he brings them to his house so Nanami can take care of Tomoe, who has a fever due to his weakened state. Narukami is horrified that the shrine is falling to pieces because Tomoe is not there to maintain it with his power. The next day, Narukami's shrine spirits summon Tomoe to see Narukami, leaving Nanami in tears. With Kurama's help, Onikiri and Kotetsu bring Nanami back to the shrine, but Tomoe hides from Narukami within the shrine. After Nanami finds Tomoe inside his pocket mirror, Narukami's shrine spirits return the deity mark to Nanami and have Tomoe revert to normal. Tomoe kisses Nanami to reseal the commitment of being her familiar, in a sort of gratitude for her helping him.
6	"The God Catches A Cold"; Transliteration: "Kamisama, Kaze o Hiku" (Japanese: 神様、風邪をひく)	Toshiaki Kanbara	Akitaro Daichi	November 5, 2012
Nanami stays home with a cold while Tomoe goes to school disguised as her in order to keep her attendance rate from slipping. Kurama is surprised when Tomoe is actually a student at this school, but has no idea that Nanami is currently Tomoe in disguise, believing that the actual Tomoe is absent. Kurama takes advantage of this and tries to impress Tomoe in English literature class and music class, but Tomoe shows no appreciation. After Kurama warns Tomoe that the presence of miasma has increased inside the school, Tomoe finds that the source is coming from a demon with a large tongue inside the girls locker room. He saves a girl named Ami Nekota from this demon, while Kurama tells Ami to keep what she saw a secret. Meanwhile, Mizuki pays Nanami a visit at the shrine and puts her to sleep to show her a peek of Tomoe's past at a village. She briefly meets an evil Tomoe, who slaughters a demon first disguised as an injured boy she found in a nearby forest. She runs back into the forest, but slips and falls. Nanami wakes up from her dream, and Tomoe returns at the shrine to kick Mizuki out. Nanami is glad to see the kindhearted Tomoe once again.
7	"The God Asks A Boy Out On A Date"; Transliteration: "Kamisama, Dēto ni Sasou" (Japanese: 神様、デートに誘う)	Yasuyuki Honda	Akitaro Daichi	November 12, 2012
At school, after dealing with Tomoe and Kurama's gained popularity and rivalry against each other, Nanami finds Ami, who has a crush on Kurama ever since what happened during the girls locker room incident. Nanami experiments a little with her divine powers by planning to get Kurama and Ami alone together in the hallways. Nanami, struggling to define exactly how she feels about Tomoe, allows a girl to walk home with him, but he later rejects the girl's offer and confronts Nanami about this. Thanks to the advice given by Ami's friend Kei Ueshima, Nanami decides to take Tomoe out on a date to an aquarium, but her childish attitude becomes problematic. At the roof of the aquarium, based on what Kurama told him earlier, Tomoe suspects Nanami to feel seduced in some way, to which she confesses her love for him. This causes Tomoe to grab her and walk across the ledge of the roof, telling her to clear her mind. However, she slips from his hands when she questions her attractiveness, falling at breakneck speed. Tomoe jumps off to save Nanami, but she orders him not to touch her. After Tomoe promises that he will not touch her ever again, she allows him to save her, but Nanami then contemplates about her forbidden love for him.
8	"The God Goes To The Beach"; Transliteration: "Kamisama, Umi e iku" (Japanese: 神様、海へいく)	Yoshitaka Koyama	Akitaro Daichi	November 19, 2012
Summer break is here and Nanami goes to the beach with Ami and Kei to take her mind off her broken heart. Although Tomoe originally planned not to join them, he reluctantly accompanies them after Mizuki decides to tag along. At first, things go fine, even though Tomoe shows jealousy for Mizuki being allowed to touch Nanami. Meanwhile, it is shown that Mikage is secretly at the beach as well with Otohiko, the Wind God. Otohiko discreetly causes Ami to drown in the ocean, and Nanami requests Tomoe to save Ami even against his better judgment, unbeknownst this is Otohiko's doing. Suddenly, the Dragon King appears to collect a debt from Tomoe since 526 years ago for attacking the north gate of Ryūgū Castle and for gouging out his right eye. The Dragon King captures Tomoe as collateral, and he tells Nanami that the debt will be repaid if his right eye is returned to him within two days. When Nanami returns to the shrine, she asks Mizuki to help her travel back in time to retrieve the Dragon King's right eye from Tomoe.
9	"The God Goes To The Dragon King's Palace"; Transliteration: "Kamisama, Ryūgūjō ni iku" (Japanese: 神様、竜宮城にいく)	Mashu Itō	Akitaro Daichi	November 26, 2012
Nanami and Mizuki follow Tomoe to his home, where they discover that Tomoe wanted to use the eye to help cure Yukiji, Tomoe's past girlfriend. When Tomoe leaves, Nanami choose to let Yukiji consume the eye, rather than to leave her feeling ill. Nanami and Mizuki return to the present, and they visit a yokai named Isohime, who can extract the eye now within Nanami's body in exchange for thirty years of her life. Isohime extracts the eye and renders Nanami unconscious, but Mizuki kisses Nanami to become her familiar to save her from Isohime and to recover the eye. After Nanami wakes up to realizing that Mizuki is now her familiar, the two head to the Dragon King's palace, encountering Kamehime, later recognized as the Dragon King's wife, who loses a quilted half coat while going to the palace. Tomoe breaks free and attacks the Dragon King, but Nanami arrives to stop the fight. Nanami states that regardless if Tomoe does not want to open up to her anymore, she will always have feelings for him. Mizuki then arrives, bringing the half coat to give to the Dragon King, who was unaware that Kamehime was the one who made it in the first place. Tomoe is dismayed upon learning that Mizuki will now be living at the shrine.
10	"Tomoe Becomes A Familiar"; Transliteration: "Tomoe, Shinshi ni naru" (Japanese: 巴衛、神使になる)	Shūhei Matsushita	Akitaro Daichi	December 3, 2012
10	"The God Goes To A Mixer"; Transliteration: "Kamisama, Goukon ni iku" (Japanese: 神様、合コンにいく)	Shūhei Matsushita	Akitaro Daichi	December 3, 2012
In a flashback, Mikage brings Tomoe to his shrine and learns that Tomoe is depressed about Yukiji's death. After Tomoe becomes Mikage's familiar, Mikage lectures Tomoe for letting a demon get away because he was rescuing a human girl in the process. Even so, Tomoe pledges to serve Mikage as his familiar for several hundred years. Having been abandoned by Mikage, Tomoe becomes depressed and lonely until Nanami arrives. Back in the present, Nanami agrees to go a mixer with Ami and Kei, who wants to hook up with a guy since she was recently dumped by her boyfriend. During the mixer, Nanami finds Mizuki in his white snake form inside Ami's purse, grabbing him and taking him straight to the restroom. Tomoe comes in the restroom to retrieve Mizuki and leaves. A boy she meets in the mixer brings her outside for some fresh air and starts flirting with her, but Tomoe arrives and kicks the boy to the curb. Tomoe grabs her hand firmly and tells her that they are going home, and Nanami realizes that Tomoe may have feelings for her.
11	"The Familiar Goes Into Town"; Transliteration: "Shinshi, Machi ni dekakeru" (Japanese: 神使、街にでかける)	Toshiaki Kanbara	Akitaro Daichi	December 10, 2012
Mizuki decides to go into town to search for Kurama, but ends up being invited by Kurama's manager to a launch party. Mizuki wonders how Kurama can live a life of stardom instead of living in a shrine. Mizuki gets drunk at the party, and a girl, mistreated by her employer, takes him outside to recuperate. As a reward her good deed before leaving, Mizuki gives the girl his sake, which would purify one's mind, shown when her employer calms down after drinking it. The next morning, Tomoe refuses to go to an amusement park to ride the Ferris wheel, that is until she finds an elegant hairpin in his room, making her suspicious. At the amusement park, Tomoe convinces Nanami to ride on a roller coaster with her, despite her not wanting to go on it, and Tomoe fixes Nanami's messy hair with a hairpin after the ride is over. Nanami later runs away in tears after seeing Tomoe fondling another girl's hair, when in fact he was helping her up from a fall. She ends up riding the Ferris wheel alone in the evening and realizes that she was wearing the same hairpin from this morning when her hair becomes undone. Tomoe finds her there and explains that he bought the hairpin for her a long time ago, but stored it away since she rarely wears her hair up. By hearing this from him, Nanami finally smiles.
12	"Nanami Quits Being A God"; Transliteration: "Nanami, Kamisama o Yameru" (Japanese: 奈々生、神様をやめる)	Yoshitaka Koyama; Chika Nagaoka	Akitaro Daichi; Michiko Yokote	December 17, 2012
At the store, Nanami gets upset when she overhears two women claiming that the shrine is haunted due its rundown appearance. When she returns to the shrine, she sees Tomoe sitting on a tree branch, pondering whether or not to cut it down since it is already wrapping around the torii. Nanami has an idea to hold a festival, in hopes of raising the reputation of the shrine, though Tomoe thinks this is a bad idea, especially after seeing her attempt to repair a palanquin. Nonetheless, he tells her that her presence has made the shrine look brighter. Nanami passes out posters and invitations for the upcoming festival. With only a week away from this festival, Nanami wants to plan events to attract the tourists. Kurama passes by the shrine, suggesting that the events should include a kagura dance and fortune-telling, and he gives Nanami some yam love treats as a gift. Tomoe has Nanami try on a beautiful kimono, and later has her rehearse the difficult kagura dance for two days. Otohiko appears at the shrine to release some miasma into the air, but Nanami fails to exorcise it after many attempts. Tomoe takes Nanami back inside the shrine, while he and Mizuki handle the miasma. Nanami feels useless as a god and runs away from the shrine. Tomoe, recalling when Mikage also suddenly left the shrine twenty years ago, calls out for Nanami, and a box in the shed filled with miasma rips open.
13	"I've Started The 'Being A God' Thing"; Transliteration: "Kamisama Hajimemashita" (Japanese: 神様はじめました)	Yasuichiro Yamamoto	Akitaro Daichi; Michiko Yokote	December 24, 2012
Tomoe and Mizuki look for Nanami, leaving Onikiri and Kotetsu to fend off the miasma by themselves. After searching in many different places, Tomoe figures out that Nanami used a white talisman to turn herself into air. Meanwhile, Nanami, recalling the events leading to meeting Tomoe for the first time, returns to the shrine after she realizes that it is her home. A tsuchigumo, which Mikage had sealed and stored long ago in the shed, breaks out of the box. Nanami saves Onikiri and Kotetsu from the tsuchigumo, and she manages to defeat it with the kagura dance, with some help from Tomoe and Mizuki. On the day of the festival, some familiar faces show up, much to Nanami's surprise, and she later performs the kagura dance in front of everyone there. After that, while Mizuki, Onikiri and Kotetsu go into the shrine to make sake, Nanami asks Tomoe how her kagura dance was. Nanami teases Tomoe when he comments that it was beautiful. Tomoe then tells Nanami that he wants to form the familiar contract with her again, but this time from the bottom of his heart, and they do so by sealing it with a kiss.
14 (OVA)	"The God Gets Dumped"; Transliteration: "Kamisama, Suterareru" (Japanese: 神様, 捨てられる)	Akitaro Daichi	Akitaro Daichi	August 20, 2013
15 (OVA)	"The God Goes to a Hot Spring"; Transliteration: "Kamisama, Onsen ni Iku" (Japanese: 神様, 温泉にいく)	Akitaro Daichi	Akitaro Daichi	August 20, 2013

=== Season 2 (2015) ===
No. overall	No. in season	Title	Directed by	Written by	Original release date
14	1	"I've Started the 'Being a God' Thing Again"; Transliteration: "Kamisama Mata Hajimemashita" (Japanese: 神様またはじめました)	Masahiro Mukai	Akitaro Daichi	January 5, 2015
As Nanami Momozono prepares for the new school term the next day, she is visited by Otohiko, who invites her to the annual gathering of the gods in Izumo called the Divine Assembly, but on the one condition that she must pass a test administered by him. The next day, Nanami agrees to this test, which is to raise a shikigami for seven days, later revealed to be in the form of a small monkey. However, Tomoe is not quite fond of this test, let alone her going to Izumo. Although Tomoe later saves Nanami from being harmed by a tsuchigumo in the library, Nanami does not want to rely on Tomoe all the time, now that her divine powers have increased. Nanami then returns to the library to place white talismans there, but a dark presence attacks her until Tomoe arrives and scares it off. Nanami is taken to the nurse's office, where Otohiko tells her to concentrate on raising the monkey shikigami instead of depending on white talismans so much. Nanami names the monkey shikigami "Mamoru" (which means "to protect"), and she follows it to the library, where Tomoe is being attacked by the same dark presence. Mamoru uses its purifying ability to vanquish the dark presence, allowing Nanami to save Tomoe.
15	2	"The God Goes to Izumo"; Transliteration: "Kamisama, Izumo e Iku" (Japanese: 神様、出雲へいく)	Yūta Murano	Akitaro Daichi	January 12, 2015
Now that Nanami has passed Otohiko's test, she has trouble deciding which one of her familiars to bring with her to the Divine Assembly. She has Tomoe and Mizuki settle the matter over a game of shogi, while she goes into town to buy a plane ticket. She later encounter four former gods who mock her while protecting a man named Kirihito, and she has Mamoru vanquish them after Kirihito gets seriously hurt. She leaves after he attempts to kiss her, but she is unaware that Kirihito is actually a yokai named Akura-Ou trapped in human form. Nanami chooses Mizuki to accompany her to Izumo, while Tomoe, despite winning the game of shogi, is forced to stay at the shrine and pose as her at school. After arriving in Izumo, Mizuki brings her to the Grand Shrine, but they get separate along the way. Nanami is not welcomed very much by the other gods due to her being a human. While Mizuki tags along with Otohiko, who is running late, Nanami is encouraged by a disembodied figure, perhaps Mikage, who tells her that her human side makes her unique from the other gods. This gives her the confidence to enter the chambers into the Divine Assembly.
16	3	"The God Falls into the Netherworld"; Transliteration: "Kamisama, Yomi ni Ochiru" (Japanese: 神様、黄泉におちる)	Hiroaki Akagi	Akitaro Daichi	January 26, 2015
Ookuninushi, lord of the Grand Shrine and host of the Divine Assembly, personally asks Nanami to go to Yomotsu Hirasaka, the portal to the Netherworld where only gods can enter and exit, for two days to prevent any yokai from passing through. In exchange, Nanami requests Ookuninushi to search the whereabouts of Mikage. When Otohiko takes Nanami to Yomotsu Hirasaka, Nanami is shocked to see Kirihito being taken into the Netherworld by a yokai named Tekkimaru, who immediately rots from the purple flames. Nanami comes in after Kirihito and tries to grab hold of him. Meanwhile, Tomoe returns to the shrine after a stressful morning, and because he misses Nanami already, he decides to go to the World Over Yonder to drink himself to sleep. A group of tanuki yokai geisha discuss that their caretaker named Mizutama witnessed when Akura-Ou slaughtered a group of apprentice geisha at an okiya 600 years ago, having her life spared by Tomoe before running away. Tomoe, waking up after thinking about Nanami, rushes back to the shrine, only to learn that he has to study for a vocabulary test in the morning. In the Netherworld, Nanami and Kirihito evade a mob of caveman yokai, and they are later summoned to meet Izanami, the Goddess of the Netherworld.
17	4	"The God Races Across the Netherworld"; Transliteration: "Kamisama, Yomi o Kakeru" (Japanese: 神様, 黄泉をかける)	Tomoko Iwasaki	Akitaro Daichi	February 2, 2015
When Nanami and Kirihito meet Izanami at her fortress, she imprisons Kirihito, telling Nanami that Kirihito possesses the body of a dead man and advising her to leave the Netherworld without him. However, Nanami decides to take matters into her own hands and tries to find Kirihito using a white talisman. In a flashback, Akura-Ou is confined in the Netherworld, where he meets Kirihito Mori, a mountain climber who dies in an avalanche. Out of boredom and curiosity, Akura-Ou accepts Kirihito's request to possess his body before waking up in the hospital, so as to send an apology to his mother for having an argument with her before his death. Back in the present, Nanami manages to find Kirihito in a prison cell, but he concerns why she is rescuing him. As they escape the fortress, Kirihito shows Nanami that he took a lock of her hair earlier so that his human body can survive in the Netherworld. The two run for their lives when a cat yokai named Hio comes after them. Tomoe, who was informed by Otohiko that Nanami is in the Netherworld, goes to Yomotsu Hirasaka. Tomoe is halted by Takehaya, the War God, who placed a seal on Yomotsu Hirasaka. Kotetsu reverts Tomoe back to his yokai form, allowing Tomoe to break the seal and enter the Netherworld to save Nanami and Kirihito. Although Kirihito tries to attack Tomoe, he leaves after asking Tomoe what Nanami means to him.
18	5	"The God Makes Her Second Romantic Confession"; Transliteration: "Kamisama, Nidome no Kokuhaku o Suru" (Japanese: 神様, 二度目の告白をする)	Toshiaki Kanbara	Akitaro Daichi	February 9, 2015
Nanami returns to the Grand Shrine, where it is the fourth day of the Divine Assembly, and Ookuninushi informs Nanami that Tomoe has been imprisoned for reverting to his yokai form. Nanami rushes over to the prison, but Tomoe tells her to give him some time before deciding to return to her service as her familiar. Mizuki, visiting Tomoe to deliver some peach pills that Nanami obtained as a gift, explains to him that he has feelings for Nanami not caused by when he was a familiar. Tomoe later tests and confirms this premise while Nanami was sleeping, but she is unaware that the kiss she had in her dream was actually real. Tomoe is forgiven by Ookuninushi and is granted to be Nanami's familiar again. After Nanami and Tomoe hang out during a festival, things go awry when Nanami tries to take off her jacket with only a camisole underneath, of which Tomoe sees that as immodest, making things awkward between them. On the last day of the Divine Assembly, Nanami finally finds Mikage, who explains that he wants to rekindle Tomoe's concern for humanity by having Tomoe interact with her. Mikage then disappears right when Tomoe catches sight of him.
19	6	"The God Meets a Little Crow"; Transliteration: "Kamisama, Kotengu ni Au" (Japanese: 神様, 小天狗にあう)	Masahiro Mukai	Akitaro Daichi	February 16, 2015
Ookuninushi thanks Nanami for her participation in the Divine Assembly. However, she feels discouraged when Ookuninushi tells her that it is not possible for humans and yokai to have a relationship with each other. She later asks Tomoe and Mizuki to return to the shrine without her. She hangs out with Himemiko of the Swamp and travels with her all over the town. Later on, Himemiko advises Nanami to enjoy her time with Tomoe for as long as she lives, since a human lives much shorter than a yokai. Meanwhile, Kirihito is visited by a yokai named Yatori, who wants to serve him in the cause of reviving Akura-Ou. On the way home from school, Nanami and Tomoe chance upon a child crow tengu named Botanmaru, who is looking for another crow tengu named Shinjūrō. However, Tomoe is mean to Botanmaru because he cannot fly, and Nanami tries to help him. In a cafe, Botanmaru explains that Shinjūrō descended from Mount Kurama at a young age after failing to learn how to fly. Nanami is shocked to learn that Botanwaru was actually referring to Shinjūrō Kurama after spotting a concert advertisement on a billboard. Nanami takes Botanmaru with her to attend the concert, where Kurama debuts a new album cover.
20	7	"The God Goes to Mount Kurama"; Transliteration: "Kamisama, Kurama-yama e Iku" (Japanese: 神様, 鞍馬山へいく)	Tomoko Iwasaki	Akitaro Daichi	February 23, 2015
Botanmaru begs Kurama to return to Mount Kurama because Sōjōbō, the third chief of the tengu village, has collapsed, filling the area with a cloud of miasma. Kurama recalls that he was mistreated by the villagers when he was younger, due to being Sōjōbō's son, but only Suiro treated him like an older brother. Nanami and Tomoe go to Mount Kurama with Kurama and Botanmaru, walking through a foggy forest. Kurama encounters an evil Suiro wielding a scythe, but he figures out that it was a hallucination after hearing a flute playing nearby, having nostalgia about Suiro. Once the four enter the village, they are welcomed by Suiro, who sadly lives in a dilapidated house away from the compound. It is shown that Yatori is really serving under Jirō, who is awaiting and determined to become the successor to the throne in a few days. As Nanami runs in the forest to use the restroom, she comes across a rotting cherry blossom tree, where three crow tengu yokai children explain that it is a thousand-year-old sacred tree. Nanami uses her powers to restore the cherry blossom tree, and the children leave with excitement, although her powers only make it last temporarily. As the leaves fall, Jirō stares directly at Nanami with a speechless face.
21	8	"The God Sneaks In"; Transliteration: "Kamisama, Sennyū Suru" (Japanese: 神様, 潜入する)	Tomoko Iwasaki	Akitaro Daichi	March 2, 2015
Jirō grabs hold of Nanami, but she manages to get away from him, thanks to Mamoru. Tomoe finds Nanami and brings her to back to Suiro, who says that delivering the peach pills to Sōjōbō is no easy task since he is secured inside the Grand Hall, a sanctum in the compound guarded by Jirō's forces. After Kurama is haggled by three crow tengu villagers who want him to be the fourth chief, which he was no intention of being, Nanami and Tomoe reject Suiro's advice of taking Kurama back to the town before involving themselves. Kurama comes up with a plan for him, Nanami and Tomoe to infiltrate the Grand Hall. Before bedtime, it is devised that Nanami will have Botanmaru accompany her to find Sōjōbō, while Tomoe and Kurama are left to face Jirō. At night, Nanami sleepwalks and accidentally lays in Tomoe's bed, which stirs up Tomoe's feelings until Nanami wakes up and runs to her bed in embarrassment. In the morning, Tomoe lies about not holding Nanami while in her sleep, claiming he was half asleep and recalling nothing of the sort. Tomoe and Kurama are welcomed past the front gate, while Nanami and Botanmaru try to find a way into the Grand Hall.
22	9	"The God Is Blindsided"; Transliteration: "Kamisama, Fuiuchi o Kurau" (Japanese: 神様, ふいうちをくらう)	Kaoru Yabana	Akitaro Daichi	March 9, 2015
Kurama shares a drink with Jirō in hopes of getting him drunk to weaken the barrier around the compound. When that fails, Tomoe transforms into Nanami to allure Jirō, which actually does the trick, allowing Nanami and Botanmaru to sneak in the Grand Hall and find Sōjōbō, who is in a frozen state, but the peach pills do not help. Nanami and Botanmaru are caught by Yatori, who informs Jirō about this, so Jirō confines Tomoe and Kurama in an electrifying iron cage and then goes with Yatori to see Nanami and Botanmaru, who are locked up in the basement. After Jirō leaves, Yatori reveals to Nanami and Botanmaru that he took the soul of Sōjōbō by way of deception. Upon hearing this, Nanami has Mamoru vanquish Yatori, who refused to tell where Sōjōbō's soul is hiding. The three crow tengu children run into Jirō, who shuns them for not paying attention to where they are going, making them upset. Suddenly, Nanami uses the idea to create a barrier around the compound to override Jirō's barrier, which disintegrates the iron cage and purifies the entire compound.
23	10	"The God Receives a Romantic Confession"; Transliteration: "Kamisama, Kokuhaku Sareru" (Japanese: 神様, 告白される)	Toshiaki Kanbara	Akitaro Daichi	March 16, 2015
Nanami uses a white talisman to find the location of Sōjōbō's soul, although it leads her to a dead end. However, Jirō finds her and reveals a hidden passageway to a cave. He tells her that a thunderbolt beast there has permanently disabled Suiro from flying after saving Kurama in the past. When Nanami and Jirō encounter the thunderbolt beast, Jirō is badly wounded while protecting Nanami. Tomoe finds them and defeats the thunderbolt beast, which actually contains Sōjōbō's soul. Jirō confesses his love for Nanami before passing out, while Kurama and Botanmaru leave to return the soul back to Sōjōbō, who later awakens fully cured. Jirō is given peach pills to recover, and he recalls Sōjōbō telling him not to be hard on himself for making mistakes in life. The mountain gradually heals, and an eternal cherry blossom celebration commences. Jirō takes Nanami high up onto the cherry blossom tree, wishing for her to remain in the tengu village with him. He thanks her for the peach pills and returns the rest of them to her, surprised that she originally got them to give to Tomoe as a parting gift someday. Jirō asks her to stay a little while longer so that he may always remember her with the cherry blossoms. Later on, Nanami gets drunk and Tomoe carries her on his back. She falls asleep after confessing her love, to which Tomoe silently confesses his love in reply.
24	11	"The God Goes Back to Being a Child"; Transliteration: "Kamisama, Kodomo ni Modoru" (Japanese: 神様, こどもにもどる)	Tomoko Iwasaki; Yasuichiro Yamamoto	Akitaro Daichi	March 23, 2015
In his shrine, Kirihito goes into the Netherworld with Yatori using a stone mirror to retrieve Akura-Ou's body. Once there, Yatori, who claims he formerly served under Akura-Ou, remembers how Akura-Ou and Tomoe traveled together and defeated any yokai that stood in their way, but Kirihito gets angry over the fact that Tomoe abandoned Akura-Ou after falling in love with a human girl. Although Akura-Ou's body is found on a mountain of fire, Yatori brings Kirihito back home since their bodies cannot handle the miasma within the Netherworld. Kirihito is now determined to do whatever necessary to reclaim Akura-Ou's body. However, after fumes start to leak out of the stone mirror, Kirihito is forced to smash it before things get any worse. Meanwhile, Nanami receives a proposal to host a wedding for Himemiko, but Tomoe is dismayed when Mizuki encourages her too much about it. Nanami, Tomoe and Mizuki head to the entrance of the Year God Shrine to receive a new talisman for the new year. Upon arrival, Nanami passes her labeled gate, despite Tomoe's orders to stay put. As Tomoe and Mizuki later passes through her gate, they are surprised to see that Nanami is transformed into a child, twelve years younger. In a flashback, Nanami's gambling father brings her a piece of chocolate before leaving again, while her ill mother is heckled by debt collectors, before Nanami returns home.
25	12	"The God Receives a Marriage Proposal"; Transliteration: "Kamisama, Kyūkon Sareru" (Japanese: 神様, 求婚される)	Yasuichiro Yamamoto	Akitaro Daichi	March 30, 2015
Nanami is taught by her mother to become an independent woman, since her father is a deadbeat and her mother is about to die. After viewing her childhood memories, Tomoe takes young Nanami away from Mizuki. After spending time with young Nanami while strolling around in the town, young Nanami asked Tomoe if he loves her, to which he confirms. Tomoe then proposes a marriage with her, to which she agrees. Just then, Mizuki carries Nanami out of the gate, and Tomoe is upset that Nanami is unable to remember him in her fantasy. Furthermore, Nanami does not know much about her mother, especially since all of the photos of her mother were burned in a house fire long ago. When Nanami, Tomoe and Mizuki make it to the Year God Shrine, they are reluctant to find out that it is blocked by the Lord Year God's sheep, of which its wool takes up a lot of room. Nanami calms the sheep down so that the Lord Year God can trim its wool. The Lord Year God gives Nanami not only the talisman, but also a picture of her mother, before she and her familiars return to their shrine. As life returns to normal for everybody, Nanami tries to remember who made a promise to marry her when she was a child, and she later realizes that it was Tomoe. Nanami states that she won't get married, "probably", which causes Tomoe to blush.

== OVAs ==
=== Kako-hen ===
No.	Title	Original release date
1	"The God leaps into the past" Transliteration: "Kamisama, Kako ni Tobu" (Japanese: 神様、過去にとぶ)	August 20, 2015
When snow begins to fall around the shrine, Nanami excitedly rushes out to play and enjoy the scenery with the spirits. Unbeknownst to them, Tomoe was struck with memories he doesn't remember and causes him to falter and fall. Nanami watched as the gate to the shrine crumbles and knows something had happened to Tomoe as his powers keeps the shrine stable. Swirls of dark marks appeared on Tomoe's body, signifying his deathly state. Panicked, Nanami tries to offer the Peach Pearls but Tomoe shoves it away claiming it wouldn't save him and he asked Mizuki to help him into another room so that Nanami doesn't see him in such a frail state. Mikage soon appears before them, and informs Nanami and others that Tomoe was cursed. When he fell in love with a human, he had made a deal with a fallen God to turn him into a human to spend the rest of his life with Yukiji. After Yukiji died, death now comes for the fox yokai. Mikage sealed Tomoe in his pocket mirror and said Tomoe only has seven days to live before the curse consumes him. Mikage reveals that he had found Tomoe in that deathly state centuries ago and the only way the God knew to save him was to seal his memories of his love for Yukiji. To break the spell, Tomoe would have to fall in love with a human again, allowing Nanami to realise the truth. Determined to save Tomoe, Nanami decides to use Mizuki's incense to travel to the past and identify the Fallen God and find out how to break the curse, or prevent the curse from ever happening. In the past, Nanami was found by Yukiji, a yokai-hating human who took Nanami under her care as she felt some connection to her. Hearing that the past-Tomoe has been found severely injured by the riverside, Nanami tried to persuade Yukiji to save him as told by Mizuki. When Yukiji refused, Nanami rushed out to find Tomoe before the villagers kill him. The sight of a human approaching caused Tomoe to swiftly turn himself into a child, hoping to trick the human and save himself. His eyes blinked and saw Nanami for the first time and his heart fluttered. Nanami carried the child-Tomoe back to Yukiji's home and cried for help. Yukiji, suspicious of the nature of the child asked if Nanami knew that Tomoe's ability would transform him into a child but Nanami brushed off that suspicion, claiming the child to be someone she knew from her village. Yukiji allowed the child to stay in her home and be treated by the village-doctor. Nanami kept her distance away from child-Tomoe to ensure that his eyes would only look at Yukiji.
2	"The Fox falls in love" Transliteration: "Kitsune, Koi ni Ochiru" (Japanese: 狐、恋に落ちる)	December 18, 2015
The villagers began accusing Yukiji of harbouring Tomoe the Yokai in her home. Yukiji found it distasteful that people would assume she would leave a yokai alive. Her adoptive father appeared and put a stop to the accusations. He expressed how important it is to not taint Yukiji's reputation as she is in the middle of receiving marriage proposals from around the country. Nanami realised she is the only one who cares for Tomoe's wellbeing and if this village finds out that he is a yokai, he will be killed. Nanami requests Fuuta, the young child under Yukiji's care, to give child-Tomoe a Peach Pearl to accelerate his recovery. In and out of consciousness, child-Tomoe sees Nanami and is constantly in awe of her but he begins to question why she only visits when he is asleep. Child-Tomoe asks Fuuta who is the woman who saved him and Fuuta, under Nanami's orders, lies and said it was Yukiji, the lady of the household. When he presents himself as awake, Nanami never returned to the room and it bothers him. Discreetly, he concocts a plan to make her his and take her with him once he regains his health but when Fuuta said that Yukiji is away to visit a family after being offered a marriage proposal, Tomoe feels unhappy. Still believing that Nanami's real name is Yukiji, he sets off to claim her or kill her as he doesn't see a reason to let her live if she will marry another human. Watching Nanami runaway in the middle of the night, Tomoe's hunt sets off. Just as he is about to reach her, Nanami falls and has difficulty breathing. Time-travelling has begun to take its toll on her body and she knows she needs to reach the Fallen God as soon as possible. The realisation of how frail humans are, deterred Tomoe to hurt Nanami, soon he questions if there is another reason why he doesn't wish to kill her. Tomoe returns to Akura-Ou's hideout and a yokai revealed that Tomoe was lovestruck, much to Tomoe's surprise. Akura-Ou is curious about this 'beautiful human' and if Tomoe truly doesn't mind, Akura-Ou would like to have her. Nanami sought out a 'Fallen God' who is just a Kappa with a bad back. The God told Nanami, in exchange for summoning an actual powerful Fallen God, they want the Peach Pearls as payment. Reaching her limits, Nanami agrees and watches the environment turn black as Kuromaro, the Fallen God arrives. Her body gives in and Nanami was pulled back to the present before she could do what she came for. Upset, Nanami hits Mikage for bringing her back too soon but he expressed that everyone who loves her is worried for her. She is not alone, Mikage said and Nanami sees the living room of Mikage Shrine filled with the ones who cherished her and Tomoe. Agreeing to rest and recover before her next time-travel trip, Nanami is filled with gratitude and joy that she is loved and is more determined than ever to get back and save Tomoe.
3	"The God becomes a Bride"; Transliteration: "Kamisama, Hanayome ni Naru" (Japanese: 神様、花嫁になる)	April 20, 2016
Nanami was found by Yukiji in the capital and brought back to her residence. Nanami is now aware that Tomoe escaped the night she left and wonders if their fate are still tied. Yukiji announces that she received a better marriage proposal with a lord after the previous man was such a pervert that Yukiji ended up kicking him for. Nanami returns to Yukiji's residence after finding out the Kappa's pond is fully tainted black after Kuromaro's summoning. Akura-Ou's minion attacked the residence to bring Yukiji back but was instantly destroyed by Yukiji's blade, startling Nanami and Fuuta. Now that they know a yokai is after Yukiji for her beauty, Nanami devises a plan to trick the yokai. She will sub in for Yukiji during the wedding procession. Nanami disguises as Yukiji and is transported by a palanquin to the house of the lord whereas Yukiji will travel by horse using an alternate route. Tomoe is agitated at the thought of Yukiji being killed by Akura-Ou's minions and believes his feelings are merely predatory, so he too sets out to kill Yukiji. Nanami's palanquin is ambushed by a poisonous fog and she is grabbed and tied by Akura-Ou's minion. When Nanami understood that she would be brought to Akura-Ou dead or alive, the gravity of the situation finally sets in and she decides to escape with the help of her Talisman. Struck by a poison-infused twig, Tomoe comes to Nanami's rescue as she slowly loses her senses and brings her to an abandoned shelter in the woods. Finally being reunited with Tomoe, Nanami yearns to touch him and hold him but knows who he sees is Yukiji. Tomoe insists on taking Nanami with him but Nanami fights back. Tomoe gives up and watches her from afar, reluctant to leave her. When bandits find Nanami poisoned in their shelter, Tomoe rescues Nanami again. He doesn't understand his actions and is beginning to wonder who this girl to him is.
4	"The God Meets Someone"; Transliteration: "Kamisama, Mukae ni Iku" (Japanese: 神様、迎えにいく)	August 19, 2016
Nanami witnessed Tomoe's kindness and gentleness again but can't help to feel bad that she is not the Yukiji he is in love with and believes his heart is misplaced. When Nanami expressed to return home, Tomoe assumed she wants to return to her (Yukiji's) fiancé to which he tries to talk her out of it. Soon, he revealed a hairpin that Nanami brought from the future and she took it back claiming it is a precious gift. Wanting to gift Nanami something similar, Tomoe brought Nanami to a field of Sakura trees in hopes to see her smile. Nanami recalls a similar incident in her present, Tomoe's words of loving her smile and his desire to see her happy. Tomoe declares he will build a palace here for Nanami for as long as she stays with him but Nanami reminded him that much like these Sakura, the beauty doesn't last long. She worries Tomoe is showing his affection to the wrong person and asks to return home once again. Tomoe then told Nanami that it was her he fell in love with, the woman he met when she was surrounded by villagers and bit him to release his hold of her. He found her magnetic and could not stop thinking about her. While Nanami realises that she was truly the one Tomoe fell in love with, she did not want to interfere with the past any more than she has. Nanami then made a promise to Tomoe, knowing this is the same Tomoe she fell for, that in the future she will marry him and that he has to wait. Her body fails her as the poison consumes her and Tomoe knew she needed to be healed and believes returning her to the village would save her. Before leaving Nanami, Tomoe requests to keep the hairpin to remember her by so that he would find her and she agreed, Tomoe left and Nanami returned to the future once again. Happily, Tomoe went in search of the Fallen God, Kuromaro to make a deal to be human so he could be with Yukiji until death parts them. To seal the contract, Kuromaro asks for an important item to Tomoe and he hands over the hairpin as a surety. On her third trip back to the past, Nanami went in search of Kuromaro, she found him still on the ground on Mount Ontake and asked what happened. Kuromaro said his end of the deal is also consuming him and he too will die much to Nanami's disbelief. Kuromaro showed Nanami the scene where Tomoe made a deal with him and Nanami knew she needed the hairpin to save Tomoe's life. Kuromaro ate the hairpin claiming this hairpin belongs to this "time" and Nanami needs to find the hairpin that exists in her present. He reminded her to remember the exact location of his body and wished her well. Excited that she has possibly found a way to guarantee Tomoe's safety, Nanami rushed back to the future before stumbling in between and landing in a timeline 20-years prior to her present. There she met Mikage and was shocked to find out that he doesn't know who she is. Hearing that Nanami knew of a way to save Tomoe, Mikage scrambles to his feet and asks what would it take to save his beloved familiar. In the present, Nanami returns and immediately requests the carriage to head to Mount Ontake with Mizuki in tow. The present Mikage knows Nanami is seeking the cure and asks Tomoe to come out of the pocket mirror. Mikage tells Tomoe of Nanami's hard work and resolve to save him despite being a "weak human" and she is now on the way to bring back the item that would do so. Tomoe scoffs at the idea and refuses to come out no matter how hard Mikage tries. Tomoe believes he does not deserve to live after allowing Yukiji to die and he continued to live on. In the darkness, Nanami pushed Mikage aside and dove towards Tomoe with the hairpin in hand and smiled brightly. She asked if he remembered her promise to him and Tomoe recalls the memory fondly as he eyes the hairpin. With their memories recovered, the 500-year curse lifted and Tomoe embraces Nanami tightly. After being in the past and envying Tomoe's love for Yukiji, Nanami asked Tomoe if he remembers who she is to which replied "Nanami", earning him her smile and they kissed.

=== Shiawase ni Naru ===
No.	Title	Original release date
1	"The God Will Be Happy"; Transliteration: "Kamisama, Shiawase ni Naru" (Japanese: 神様、幸せになる)	December 20, 2016
To honour Kuromaro's deal, the God Okuninushi arrived at Mikage Shrine and announced that he would be able to turn Tomoe into a human. While both Tomoe and Nanami were excited, Mikage advised against it as Tomoe barely knows how to live with humans, much less as a human himself. With that, Nanami requests to delay Tomoe's transformation for a year until after they both graduate. Fast forward by a year, Nanami is seen shopping with her friends Kei and Ami who is aware of her Goddess-status and rides on the carriage as a means of transport. Nanami bids farewell to the two before returning to the shrine, excited that this would be the last day she and Tomoe would live there. Back at the shrine, Kurama, Mizuki and Tomoe drank to their hearts content acknowledging Nanami's existence brought these three together and they would soon part ways. Tomoe would be human, Kurama would be returning to his home in the mountains and Mizuki will stay as Mikage's familiar. The next day was Graduation Day and Nanami wondered why Tomoe's buttons were missing (In Japanese tradition, boys would normally give their second button of their uniform to the girl they like. In this case, Tomoe had his buttons taken from him). Mizuki opened a portal outside the gates of the school and tells Tomoe and Nanami to get in as the ceremony is about to begin. In the portal realm, Nanami was dressed as a bride and Tomoe appeared in his groom ensemble. When he laid his eyes on Nanami, he embraced her and happily squealed "You're finally mine", making Nanami blush and pet his head in agreement. They were finally together in the presence of their loved ones and friends and at the end of the path, Nanami saw Mikage, Okuninushi and Otohiko, signifying the moment Tomoe will be turned human. The final scene shows Nanami and Tomoe at an older age, with Nanami carrying a baby, both looking as happy as they were the day they married. Note: This was originally announced as "Kamisama, Kekkon Zenya"—"The God at the Eve of Marriage" before being released under the current title.
