= Hanae =

- Gender: Female

Origin
- Origin: Japanese
- Meaning: Different meanings depending on the kanji used

Hanae (written: 英恵, 華英, 華絵 or 花絵) is a feminine Japanese given name. Notable people with the name include:

- Hanae Aoyama (青山 華依; born 2002), Japanese athlete
- Hanae Ito (伊藤 華英; born 1985), Japanese swimmer
- Hanae Kan (韓 英恵; born 1990), Japanese actress
- Hanae Kubo (久保 英恵; born 1982), Japanese ice hockey player
- Hanae Mori (森 英恵; 1926–2022), Japanese fashion designer
- Hanae Shibata (柴田 華絵; born 1992), Japanese women's footballer
- Hanae Yokoya (横谷 花絵; born 1978), Japanese figure skater
- Hanae (singer) (born 1994), Japanese singer

Hanae (written: 花江) is also a Japanese surname. Notable people with the surname include:

- Natsuki Hanae (花江 夏樹; born 1991), Japanese voice actor
