= Moshi =

Moshi may refer to:

== Places ==
- Moshi, Tanzania, a city
  - Moshi Airport
- Moshi Rural, a district
- Moshi Urban, a district
- Roman Catholic Diocese of Moshi, a diocese located in the city of Moshi
- Moshi, Maharashtra, India
- Moshi, Shimen (磨市镇), a town in Shimen County, Hunan Province, China

== People ==
- Haruna Moshi (born 1987), Tanzanian footballer
- Magdalena Moshi (born 1990), Tanzanian swimmer
- Moshi Kakoso (born 1968), Tanzanian politician

== Other uses ==
- Moshi Monsters, a web browser game

== See also ==
- Moschi (disambiguation)
- Moshi Moshi (disambiguation)
- Mochi (disambiguation)
