= Moshi Moshi =

Moshi moshi (もしもし) is a telephone greeting used in Japan.

Moshi Moshi may refer to:

- Moshi Moshi Records, a small London-based record label
- Moshi Moshi Harajuku, the debut mini-album by Japanese pop singer Kyary Pamyu Pamyu
- Moshi Moshi EP, an extended play by Digitalism
- "Moshi Moshi", a song by Brand New on the EP Brand New / Safety in Numbers
- "Moshi Moshi", a song by Poppy on the album Poppy.Computer
- Moshi Moshi, a 2010 novel by Japanese author Banana Yoshimoto
- "Mosi Mosi?", a 2026 song by Japanese singer Sasane
