= Mosi Mosi? =

2026 song by Sasane

Single by Sasane
- Language: Japanese
- Released: 21 April 2026
- Genre: electropop; Shibuya-kei
- Length: 2:43
- Songwriter: Tamico Mukoda

"Mosi Mosi?" (stylized in low-caps) is the debut song of Japanese singer Sasane. Released in April 2026, it became viral on TikTok and became popular in Japan and South Korea, topping the Billboard Japan Heatseekers Songs chart.

== Composition ==
"Mosi Mosi?" is sung by Sasane. The lyrics, composition, and arrangement were from Tamico Mukoda, and the mixing was handled by NNZN. Cho Hee-soo of Fastpaper called the song "cute, upbeat, and bouncy". Nakagawa described the song as electropop, stating that it "blends retro-style electronic sounds with a crisp, snappy rhythm", and Sankei Sports called the melody "catchy [and] electronic-infused".

Yukako Yajima wrote on Billboard Japan that "Mosi Mosi?" combines both Mukoda's Heisei J-pop style and Sasane's unique image, as well as elements of Japanese culture such as anime, city pop, denpa-kei, kawaii, Shibuya-kei, and video game music, which she stated attracted global appeal. Sasane described her own song as "Sasane", explaining that she sought to make a song that introduces her. Several retro kawaii aspects, including radio wave-like sound effects and telephone ringtones, are used in the song. Kin Nakagawa of Sound & Recording Magazine remarked that the song "might as well be the Shibuya-kei of the Reiwa era", stating that Sasane "captured that specific, relaxed, 'unforced' vibe" seen in the genre.

"Mosi Mosi?" uses a chorus that "makes effective use of repetition and rhyming", which Nakagawa says makes it "instantly memorable upon the first listen" and allowed it to become viral. Town News stated that it "features catchy lyrics [and] an infectious, repetitive rhythm".

One of the lyrics of "Mosi Mosi?" is "Moshimōshi, kikoe teru?" (もしもーし、聞こえてる？; lit. "Hello, can you hear me?"), which Hiromi Nishijima called the song's "striking hook", explaining that South Korean users were attracted to the unique nature of the phrase moshi moshi. Sasane explained that she was inspired by her previous acoustic music career to add the lyric, which appeared in the beginning of her cover videos. During the song's choreography, a "phone pose" is also made when the lyric is sung.

== Release ==
"Mosi Mosi?" was Sasane's first song, released on TikTok's SoundOn service on 4 March 2026. Shortly before the release, she had posted remakes of covers she had previously made of recently-viral songs, which Yajima said provided traction for the release of "Mosi Mosi?". An a cappella version was also released for TikTok users on 21 April. It received a digital release on 22 April 2026.

A Korean-language version of "Mosi Mosi"? was released on 15 May. On 15 June, she released the song's "Seoul Visualizer" video, which features her first in-person performance (at a Seoul girls' school) and a dance challenge showing a few dozen groups of students. Sankei Sports said that the video expressed the song's theme of "searching for a 'soulmate' on the same wavelength through the airwaves". She also released a remix of the song with KiiiKiii's Leesol, which she later performed on The First Take in August 2026.

A music video for "Mosi Mosi?", released in June 2026, was filmed in her native Yokosuka, showing local places like antique clothing store Disconchi, Umikaze Park, and Wakamatsu Market; she also obtained her music video outfits from local antique stores. By August 2026, it had reached 10 million views.

== Popularity and reception ==
"Mosi Mosi?" reached #13 on the Billboard Japan Hot Shot Songs in May 2026. It also topped the Billboard Japan Heatseekers Songs chart on 10 June 2026. The song also gained popularity overseas, topping #3 in Billboard Japan's South Korea chart and appearing in the Top 20 for equivalent charts in Indonesia, Malaysia, Thailand, Singapore, and the United States. It topped the Shazam chart and the Spotify Viral chart in both Japan and South Korea.

In November 2026, a SoftBank Group commercial showed her dancing to a parody of "Mosi Mosi?" with Ayumu Nakajima and Yuno Nagao; CDJournal stated that the parody allowed the commercial to "convey the fun of getting a smartphone for the first time". A cover by Dazbee was said by UtaTen to have "captivated many listeners with its airy, adorable vocal style", and Sasane herself stopped by to comment on the song.

=== TikTok popularity ===
"Mosi Mosi?" was released on TikTok before its full-length release and went viral, accumulating three billion views by June 2026. In both Japan and South Korea, it topped the TikTok Top 50 and Viral 50.

Following its release, "Mosi Mosi?" became popular on social media after usage by influencers like Hina Nagahama and Sakura. It later spread amongst several K-pop groups after You Dayeon used it in a video published on 31 March. Known as the Mosi Mosi Challenge, examples of K-pop groups involved include BoyNextDoor, Enhypen, Illit, Ive, Le Sserafim, Milk, MiSaMo, NCT Wish, NiziU, Seventeen, Stray Kids, Tomorrow X Together, Twice, TWS, and Zerobaseone.

Nishijima compared the Mosi Mosi Challenge to the viral "Ai Scream!" due to their connections to the kawaii aesthetic, and Nakagawa drew comparisons to the Labubu as an example of K-pop's trendsetting nature. Yajima added that SoundOn's June 2026 promotional campaign helped the song gain momentum overseas.

== Charts ==
Weekly chart performance for "Mosi Mosi?"
| Chart (2026) | Peak position |
|---|---|
| Japan (Billboard Japan Heatseekers Songs) | 1 |
| Japan (Billboard Japan Hot Shot Songs) | 13 |
