= Rebooting (TV series) =

- (ブラッシュアップライフ)
- Genre: Comedy, Fantasy, Time Slip
- Written by: Bakarhythm
- Starring: Sakura Ando; Kaho; Haruka Kinami
- Narrated by: Keiko Nakamura
- Music by: Fox Capture Plan
- Country of origin: Japan
- Original language: Japanese
- No. of seasons: 1
- No. of episodes: 10

Production
- Producers: Reina Oda; Mayuko Sakakibara; Hiroki Shibata; Kaori Suzuki
- Production company: Nippon Television

Original release
- Network: NNS (Nippon TV)
- Release: January 8 – March 12, 2023

Rebooting (Japanese: ブラッシュアップライフ, Hepburn: Burasshu Appu Raifu), also known as Brush Up Life, is a Japanese fantasy comedy drama starring Sakura Ando. It was first broadcast on January 8, 2023, on Nippon TV and is available online on Hulu. Comedian Bakarhythm wrote the scenario with music composed by Fox Capture Plan.

== Plot ==
Set in Kumagaya, Saitama, the series focuses on 33 year-old Asami Kondo and the people with whom she spends her daily life in the city, including her best friends Natsuki and Miho. She works at a town hall and lives with her parents and younger sister. Despite having a normal, dull life, she is relatively satisfied. After getting hit by a truck and meeting her demise, she finds herself in a completely white room containing only a reception desk and two doors. At the desk, she learns that she can choose to either reincarnate as a Giant anteater or restart her current life. Choosing the latter, Asami decides to redo her life and accumulate good deeds so as to reincarnate as a human in the next life.

With memories and knowledge from her previous life intact, Asami is able to correct and solve the various problems that arose around her, including prolonging her grandfather's life with her knowledge as pharmacist. Asami is also able to outlive her previous lifespan shortly before she died again.

In third life, Asami moved out to Tokyo and works at Nippon TV with the goal of turning her experience into a movie. Before she could watch her own work, however, Asami once again met her demise. Started to feel frustrated, she made decision to accumulate more deeds and concentrate more on study in her next reboot.

In her fourth life, Asami became a researcher at a laboratory where she would discover a bacteria that could cause disease. As Asami focused on her study during her youth, she missed her chance to befriend Natsuki and Miho. Instead, she became friends with Mari, the model student whom she felt distant in her previous lives.

Mari confesses to Asami that she has also rebooted her life many times. In fact, in Mari's first life, she and the three were good friends. Mari has been rebooting he life to save Natsuki and Miho from a plane crash by becoming a pilot. She ultimately failed again and lost her life in the crash. Asami is left with grief and eventually also met her demise.

In the white room, Asami learns that she is able to reincarnate as human in next life. Instead, she decided to use her last chance to save the three. Asami is able to reunited with Mari and become pilots together, ultimately succeeded in avoiding the plane crash, saving Natsuki, Miho, and the passengers of the plane. Asami resolved that she doesn't mind not being able to reincarnate as human, as long she can stay in her hometown She eventually passes away from old age.

In the future, four pigeons were seen perched together on a power line in front of Asami's house.

== Cast ==
- Sakura Ando as Kondo Asami (Ah-chin)
  - Yuno Nagao, Ami Wada, and Yuna Yasuhara as her younger selves.
  - Hiroko Ishihara as her older self.
- Kaho as Natsuki Kadokura (Nacchi)
  - Mami Kobuki and Ikoi Hayase as her younger selves.
  - Yuki Tachibana as her older self.
- Haruka Kinami as Miho Yonekawa (Miipon)
  - Otone Maeda and Moeno Sumida as her younger selves.
  - Ritsuko Naito as her older self.
- Asami Mizukawa as Mari Uno (Maririn)
  - Itsuki Itagaki and Nanami Taki as her younger selves.
  - Miyoko Sengoku as her older self.
- Shota Sometani as Shunsuke Fukuda (Fuku-chan)
- Haru Kuroki as Rena Moriyama
- Yui Ichikawa as Shizuka Tagami (Shii-chan)
- Kayo Noro as Misa Maruyama (Gon-chan)
- Bakarhythm as reception guy

Preceded by Invert; November 20, 2022 – December 25, 2022	Nippon TV Saturday Dramas; Sunday 22:30 – 00:00 (JST); 2023	Succeeded by Passion for Punchlines; April 9, 2023
