= Moschi =

Moschi or Moschoi is a term from ancient records, and may refer to one of the following peoples:

- Mushki, an Iron Age people of Anatolia, known from Assyrian sources
- Moschia, a part of the Caucasus Mountains also associated with the Moschi/Moschoi
- Meskheti, a region and former province of Georgia located within Moschia
- Meskhetians, people from Meskheti
- Meskhetian Turks, the former Muslim inhabitants of Meskheti, which is along the border with Turkey

== See also ==
- Moshi (disambiguation)
