= Otaku Vampire's Love Bite =

Japanese manga series

- First tankōbon volume cover

推しに甘噛み (Oshi ni Amagami)
- Genre: Romantic comedy
- Manga
- Written by: Julietta Suzuki
- Published by: Hakusensha
- English publisher: NA: Viz Media
- Imprint: Hana to Yume Comics
- Magazine: Hana to Yume
- Original run: November 5, 2022 – present
- Volumes: 11
- Anime television series
- Licensed by: Viz Media
- icon

Otaku Vampire's Love Bite (Japanese: 推しに甘噛み, Hepburn: Oshi ni Amagami) is a Japanese manga series written and illustrated by Julietta Suzuki. It began serialization in Hakusensha's shōjo manga magazine Hana to Yume in November 2022. An anime television series adaptation has been announced.

== Plot ==
Hina Alucard is a modern vampire and recluse living in Romania who drinks packaged blood instead of feeding on humans. After her father gives her a DVD of the anime series Vampire Cross, she becomes enamored with the character Mao and moves to Japan to pursue her interest in otaku culture.

== Media ==
=== Manga ===
Written and illustrated by Julietta Suzuki, Otaku Vampire's Love Bite began serialization in Hakusensha's shōjo manga magazine Hana to Yume on November 5, 2022. Its chapters have been collected into eleven tankōbon volumes as of November 2026.

In February 2024, Viz Media announced that it had licensed the series for English publication, with the first volume releasing in October.

No.	Original release date	Original ISBN	English release date	English ISBN
1	March 20, 2023	978-4-592-22438-9	October 1, 2024	978-1-9747-4728-3
2	July 20, 2023	978-4-592-22439-6	January 7, 2025	978-1-9747-5162-4
3	November 20, 2023	978-4-592-22440-2	April 1, 2025	978-1-9747-5233-1
4	March 19, 2024	978-4-592-22478-5	July 1, 2025	978-1-9747-5522-6
5	June 20, 2024	978-4-592-22490-7	October 7, 2025	978-1-9747-5861-6
6	October 18, 2024	978-4-592-22505-8	January 6, 2026	978-1-9747-6152-4
7	February 20, 2025	978-4-592-22522-5	April 7, 2026	978-1-9747-6153-1
8	July 18, 2025	978-4-592-22539-3	July 7, 2026	978-1-9747-6586-7
9	December 19, 2025	978-4-592-22559-1	December 1, 2026	978-1-9747-6904-9
10	July 17, 2026	978-4-592-22589-8	—	—
11	November 20, 2026	978-4-592-22601-7	—	—

=== Anime ===
An anime television series adaptation was announced by ShoPro Entertainment on November 4, 2026. Viz Media has licensed the series.

== Reception ==
The series was nominated for the 14th An An Manga Award in 2023.
