= Karakuri Odette =

Japanese manga series

- Cover of the Japanese version of the third volume of Karakuri Odette published by Hakusensha

カラクリオデット (Karakuri Odetto)
- Genre: Slice of life, Science fiction
- Manga
- Written by: Julietta Suzuki
- Published by: Hakusensha
- English publisher: NA: Tokyopop
- Magazine: Hana to Yume
- Original run: September 5, 2005 – December 5, 2007
- Volumes: 6

Karakuri Odette (Japanese: カラクリオデット, Hepburn: Karakuri Odetto; lit. "Mechanized Puppet Odette") is a Japanese shōjo manga by Julietta Suzuki that was serialized in the bi-weekly Japanese shōjo manga anthology Hana to Yume. Though Karakuri Odette is actually Suzuki's second series, it was awarded the "Outstand Debut" award in the 31st Hakusensha Athena Newcomers' Awards. The series's 35 chapters were compiled into 6 volumes by Hakusensha. The series is licensed for an English release in the United States and Canada by Tokyopop.

== Plot ==
Odette is an android created by Professor Yoshizawa. One day, she asks to be enrolled at a local school, so she can learn and understand the difference between "those girls" (high school girls seen on a TV program) and herself.

== Characters ==
=== Main characters ===
Odette Yoshizawa (吉沢オデット, Yoshizawa Odetto)
The heroine of the series, an android designed by Professor Yoshizawa. She is enrolled in a school by the Professor after she asks to go to school. Only the staff knows that she is an android, as it is kept a secret from the students. Odette is capable of expressing human emotions and is programmed to not harm people in any way, which is the main detail that gets her accepted into the school. She is curious as to what makes her different from humans.
Professor Hiroaki Yoshizawa (吉沢ヒロアキ, Yoshizawa Hiroaki)
Commonly referred to just as Professor. He created Odette, remodeled Chris, and is an android scholar. The Professor cares a lot for Odette and tries to make her happy to the best of his ability, giving her just about anything she wants, except a cellphone. He is a fatherly figure for Odette and Chris.
Chris Yoshizawa (吉沢クリス, Yoshizawa Kurisu)
Originally known as "Chris Number Seven" or "the bomb boy," Chris is an android created by an unknown person, later revealed to be Prof. Alex Owen. He was number 7 out of 10 "Chrises", created to assassinate certain professors. He first arrives claiming to be "sent by Professor Trout of Silicon Valley for maintenance." However, Chris was really sent to Professor Yoshizawa to blow him up, but waits with Odette, since the Professor is away at a Christmas party. Odette is kind and friendly towards him, and before Professor Yoshizawa arrives home, Chris locks Odette in the wine cellar and goes to blow the Professor up. The bomb within Chris turns out to be a dud, and the Professor tells him that he can make his own decisions, as Odette does. After the professor remodels him, Chris lives with Odette and the Professor, eventually joining Odette at school. His character is best described by a phrase that he repeats often when a choice is presented to him: "Either one is fine." In the Chapter 25 special side story, Chris number 10 was sent to kill his designated professor but he stayed with the professor's family, only to sacrifice himself to save a girl named Reina, who was the heir of a fortune, after finding out that Reina's uncle was going to kill her and blame Chris 10 for it.
Asao Kurose (黒瀬朝生, Kurose Asao)
A punk boy who is known throughout the whole school as being a holy terror. When Odette interferes in a fight and gets hit over the head with an iron pipe he takes her to the school infirmary, where the nurse lets slip that Odette is a robot. He later becomes Odette's friend and thus is at the receiving end of Chris' hatred. He is a year ahead of Odette, and has a crush on Yoko Morino. He is often the one helping or comforting Odette, even when he does not want to admit it. He is a different type of punk than Hashiba.

=== Classmates ===
Yoko Morino (守野洋子, Morino Yōko)
Odette's first close friend at school, who has a chronic respiratory illness. She is in love with a boy named Okada.
Miwako Yokoyama
A close friend of Odette and Yoko.
Akihisa Yukimura (柚木村明久, Yukimura Akihisa)
A best friend to Hashiba. Yukimura falls in love with Odette when he first meets her, "at first sight," in his own words. He tells Odette that he likes her, in the same way that Yoko likes Okada. He is first seen in chapter 11.
Shirayuki Ringozaka
A rich girl isolated by her ability to hear the inner thoughts of others. After meeting Odette ("I cannot hear anything"), discovering that Odette is a robot (from the inner thoughts of the Professor) and hearing Odette declare that her school is fun, Shirayuki decides to enroll in that school. After a difficult first day, and about to give the project up, she tells Odette that she has decided that she will stay in school a little longer, so as to protect Odette from being taken advantage of. Introduced in the fourth volume, chapter 18.
Iwasaki
A friend of Asao. He is more outgoing and talkative than Asao. He invites Odette to do karaoke with him.
Mika (ミカ)
A rich girl in the same class as Yukimura, who asks her for advice in approaching Odette. Her answers show her annoyance. Odette guesses that she likes Asao, since her heart beats faster when they are talking about him. She is first seen in chapter 13.
Hashiba
A punk boy at school a year behind Odette. He is first seen in chapter 11. He is a different type of punk than Asao Kurose.
Tetsuya Okada (岡田哲也, Okada Tetsuya)
Yoko's boyfriend. Mentioned and shown in brief glimpses earlier. He and Yoko with Odette, and Asao go on a double-date to Pixie-Land in chapter 17.
A-ko
English translation name for a fake friend hired by Shirayuki's family to accompany Shirayuki at school, who acts like a little sister sort of girl. Shirayuki rejects A-ko, which simply means that A-ko attends the class next door instead and comes over when she can.
Professor Alex Owen
Another genius at creating robots. He is self-absorbed and egotistical. Professor Yoshizawa describes Owen as a "mad scientist" to Asao. He had created the Chris series of robots on commission, and tells Professor Yoshizawa that he had not known what they were intended for. Professor Owen wants to acquire Odette and merge her with his masterpiece, Travis. First seen in chapter 27.
Travis
A robot created by Professor Alex Owen, which he considers his masterpiece. Travis and Professor Owen come to Japan to find a bride for Travis, though he does not really know what a "bride" is, and is not interested in becoming his "papa's", Professor Owen's, ultimate anything. First seen in chapter 26.
Grace
An earlier robot created by Professor Owen, which he considered his masterpiece before he built Travis and lost interest in her. Professor Owen had also, at one point, promised that she would become Travis' bride. After he created Travis, he remodeled her body and weaponized it. She typically wears an ankle-length dark skirt, a matching dark jacket and dark wide brimmed hat. Her character is rather stolid and unimaginative. Travis complains that she is boring and no fun to play with. First seen in chapter 26.

== Manga ==
Karakuri Odette was published in Japan by Hakusensha in Hana to Yume in 35 chapters between September 2005 and December 2007, and collected in six volumes. The series was awarded the "Outstand Debut" award at the 31st Hakusensha Athena Newcomers' Awards. It is licensed in North America by Tokyopop and in Taiwan by Tong Li Publishing. Tokyopop's license for the series was accidentally announced by a listing for the first volume on Amazon.ca.

=== Volume list ===
No.	Original release date	Original ISBN	North America release date	North America ISBN
1	June 19, 2006	4592181166	September 29, 2009	1-4278-1407-4
Chapters 1-5
2	October 19, 2006	4592181174	February 2, 2010	1-4278-1408-2
Chapters 6-11
3	April 19, 2007	9784592181187	May 11, 2010	1-4278-1409-0
Chapters 12-17
4	September 19, 2007	9784592181194	August 31, 2010	1-4278-1410-4
Chapters 18-23
5	January 18, 2008	9784592181200	December 28, 2010	1-4278-1588-7
Chapters 24-29
6	April 18, 2008	9784592181217	March 29, 2011	—
Chapters 30-35

== Reception ==
Deb Aoki, writing for About.com, stated that while Suzuki could have made Odette very unlikable, she instead "created a genuinely likeable teen robot who is more human than she thinks". Aoki praised the series, saying that it had "more to say than just your usual "he loves me, he loves me not" drama" of most shōjo series. Aoki also mentioned that the lack of "usual fussy school uniforms, floral flourishes or bishonen (pretty boy) eye-candy" was refreshing, allowing for the series' "heartfelt sincerity, gentle humor and thought-provoking sci-fi twists [to] shine through." Michelle Smith of Pop Culture Shock reviewed that in Suzuki's hands the series was "positively charming." Smith noted the plain quality of the art, and that sometimes the characters were "awkwardly posed," but felt that the paneling was good. Carlo Santos of Anime News Network also had words of praise for the series, calling it a "heartwarming bit of escapism" though he noted that the lack of real scientific facts could make it unreadable for some. Santos later gave the second volume a B grade, saying, "Perhaps the most impressive thing is the series' ability to entertain even though it's not particularly ambitious or spectacular."
