= Julietta Suzuki =

Japanese manga artist

Julietta Suzuki 鈴木ジュリエッタ
- Born: December 6, 1980 (age 45) Fukuoka Prefecture, Japan
- Areas: Character design, writer, manga artist
- Notable works: Karakuri Odette; Kamisama Kiss; Otaku Vampire's Love Bite
- Awards: Great Effort – Asa ga Kuru; Outstanding Debut – Karakuri Odette

Julietta Suzuki (鈴木 ジュリエッタ, Suzuki Jurietta; born December 6, 1980) is a Japanese manga artist. She is best known for the series Karakuri Odette and Kamisama Kiss, both of which were serialized in Hakusensha's Hana to Yume magazine.

== Biography ==
Suzuki was born on December 6, 1980 in Fukuoka Prefecture, Japan. Her pen name comes from a character named Julietta Sakamoto from the seinen manga series, Air Master.

Suzuki has a love of cats, koalas, and sharks. According to an interview with Hakusensha, she first started drawing when she was in her second year of elementary school in a sketchbook of Japonica. She has stated that although does not read much, she enjoys works by Junji Ito. Her favorite character is Ashia. Suzuki has mentioned that she finds male characters easier to draw in general.

=== Career ===
Suzuki first made her debut by submitting her work, Ura Antique (裏アンティーク) to Hakusensha's 44th Big Challenge. Her one-shot was later short listed and published in the first August issue of Hana to Yume in 2004. Her second one-shot, Asa ga Kuru (朝が来る; Morning Has Come) was again submitted, but to the Hana to Yume Mangaka Course, in which she won the Great Effort Award. The one-shot was then serialized in Hana to Yume's 16th issue.

Suzuki then wrote another one-shot, Hoshi ni Naru Hi (星になる日; The Day I Needed the Stars) and it was published in Hana to Yume's special publication, Hana to Yume Plus, which was released on September 15, 2004. In the November issue of Bessatsu Hana to Yume, she had another one-shot, Mai Pureshasu (マイプレシャス; My Precious). Ogami-ya Uradaichō (拝み屋裏台帳) was her last one-shot for that year. It appeared in the 24th issue of Hana to Yume.

In 2005, she had yet another one-shot, Mai Buraddi Raifu (マイブラッディライフ; My Bloody Life) in the January issue of Bessatsu Hana to Yume. She then published Tsubaki Ori (椿檻) in Hana to Yume's February issue. In April, Sakurachiru (サクラチル) was also published in the same magazine. Then in June, her first series titled Akuma to Doruche (悪魔とドルチェ; Akuma to Dolce) began to serialize in Hana to Yume. Shortly after Akuma to Dolce, Suzuki started another series, Karakuri Odetto (カラクリオデット; Karakuri Odette) in Hana to Yume.

In 2007, she had one more one-shot, Katakoi★Akuma-chan (片恋★悪魔ちゃん; One-sided Love★Akuma-chan) for the 14th issue of Hana to Yume. In its January 2008 issue, Karakuri Odette had finally ended its serialization with 35 chapters, compiled into 6 volumes. Not long after Karakuri Odette ended, she started another series, Kami-sama Hajimemashita (神様はじめました; Nice to Meet You, Kamisama) (called Kamisama Kiss in Viz's English version), in the same magazine.

She attended her first signing event in Animate located at Takashima, Nishi-ku, Yokohama, Kanagawa Prefecture on May 24, 2009.

In 2008, she placed Akuma to Dolce on hiatus.

In 2016, after wrapping up Kamisama Kiss, she began working on a manga titled Tripitaka Torinique.

In 2018, after finishing up Tripitaka Torinique, she began working on a romantic comedy ninja manga titled Ninkoi.

In 2020, after Ninkoi ended, she began working on a manga titled Meitantei Kо̄ko wa Yūutsu.

In 2022, after Meitantei Kо̄ko wa Yūutsu concluded, she began working on a vampire romantic comedy manga titled Otaku Vampire's Love Bite.

== Works ==
=== One-shots ===
- Hoshi ni Naru Hi
- My Precious
- Ogami-ya Uradaichō
- My Bloody Life
- Tsubaki Ori
- Sakurachiru
- Katakoi Akuma-chan
- Ura Antique
- Asa ga Kuru

=== Series ===
- Akuma to Dolce
- Karakuri Odette
- Kamisama Kiss
- Ninkoi
- Tripitaka Toriniku
- Mei tantei Kouko wa yuutsu
- Otaku Vampire's Love Bite

Kamisama Kiss, Karakuri Odette, and Otaku Vampire's Love Bite are licensed for English release, the first and third by Viz Media and the second by Tokyopop.

== Awards ==
- Great Effort – 338th Hana to Yume Mangaka Course for her second submitted work, Asa ga Kuru.
- Outstanding Debut – 31st Hakusensha Athena Newcomers' Awards for her second series, Karakuri Odette.
