= Kamisama Kiss =

Japanese manga series

- First tankōbon volume cover, featuring Tomoe (back) and Nanami Momozono (front)

神様はじめました (Kamisama Hajimemashita)
- Genre: Romantic comedy; Supernatural
- Manga
- Written by: Julietta Suzuki
- Published by: Hakusensha
- English publisher: NA: Viz Media
- Imprint: Hana to Yume Comics
- Magazine: Hana to Yume
- Original run: February 20, 2008 – May 20, 2016
- Volumes: 25
Further information
Anime television series
Directed by	Akitaro Daichi
Produced by	Ikumi Hayashi; Hideyuki Nanba; Shinsaku Hatta; Gorō Shinjuku; Ryōichi Ishihara; Ryō Tomoda; Mai Kurachi (OVA)
Written by	Akitaro Daichi; Michiko Yokote (#12–13)
Music by	Toshio Masuda
Studio	TMS Entertainment
Licensed by	Crunchyroll (Note: In North America through Crunchyroll, LLC (formerly known as Funimation) and in Australia through Madman Anime.); UK: MVM Films
Original network	TV Tokyo
English network	AU: ABC Me; SEA: Animax Asia; US: Funimation Channel
Original run	October 2, 2012 – December 25, 2012
Episodes	13 + OVA
Anime television series
Kamisama Kiss 2
Directed by	Akitaro Daichi
Produced by	Kenji Yamaguchi; Ryōichi Ishihara; Ikumi Hayashi; Masakatsu Ōmuro; Mai Kurachi
Written by	Akitaro Daichi
Music by	Toshio Masuda
Studio	TMS Entertainment; V1 Studio
Licensed by	Crunchyroll; UK: MVM Films
Original network	TV Tokyo
English network	SEA: Animax Asia; US: Funimation Channel
Original run	January 6, 2015 – March 31, 2015
Episodes	12
Original video animation
Kamisama Kiss: Kako-hen
Directed by	Akitaro Daichi
Produced by	Ikumi Hayashi; Mai Kurachi; Kazuko Nishida
Written by	Akitaro Daichi
Music by	Toshio Masuda
Studio	TMS Entertainment; V1 Studio
Licensed by	Crunchyroll
Released	August 20, 2015 – August 19, 2016
Runtime	30 minutes
Episodes	4
Original animation DVD
Kamisama Kiss: Kamisama, Shiawase ni Naru
Directed by	Akitaro Daichi
Produced by	Ikumi Hayashi; Mai Kurachi
Written by	Akitaro Daichi
Music by	Toshio Masuda
Studio	TMS Entertainment; V1 Studio
Released	December 20, 2016
Runtime	13 minutes
Episodes	1
- icon

Kamisama Kiss (Japanese: 神様はじめました, Hepburn: Kamisama Hajimemashita (Note: Kamisama Hajimemashita translates to I've Started the "Being a God" Thing. The series' title was used for the 13th episode of the anime adaptation, which was officially released in English with the aforementioned translation.)) is a Japanese manga series written and illustrated by Julietta Suzuki. It was serialized in Hakusensha's shōjo manga magazine Hana to Yume from February 2008 to May 2016, with its chapters collected in 25 tankōbon volumes. The series was licensed for English release in North America by Viz Media, released as part of its Shojo Beat imprint.

A 13-episode anime television series adaptation produced by TMS Entertainment and directed by Akitaro Daichi was broadcast on TV Tokyo from October to December 2012. A second 12-episode season was broadcast from January to March 2015. The series was followed by a four-part original animation DVD (OAD), subtitled Kako-hen, released from August 2015 to August 2016.

== Plot ==
Nanami Momozono, a kind-hearted high school girl, aspires to an ordinary life, but her irresponsible father's gambling debts leave her homeless after debt collectors force her out of her apartment. While contemplating her situation on a park bench, she encounters a man named Mikage, who is being chased by a dog and dangling from a tree. After rescuing him, Mikage offers her his home in gratitude upon learning of her plight.

Upon arriving at Mikage's residence, Nanami discovers it is not a typical house but a shrine. She is greeted by Onikiri and Kotetsu, the shrine's guardians, and meets Tomoe, Mikage's yōkai familiar. She learns that Mikage was the Land God of the shrine and has transferred his divine status to her, marking her forehead as his successor. Though initially hesitant, Nanami gradually adapts to her new role, striving to fulfill her duties while living alongside Tomoe and the shrine attendants.

Over time, Nanami develops romantic feelings for Tomoe, but he rejects her, citing the taboo of a relationship between a human and a yōkai. Despite his resistance, Tomoe finds himself drawn to her as well, complicating their dynamic as they navigate their shared life at the shrine.

== Characters ==
=== Main characters ===
Nanami Momozono (桃園奈々生, Momozono Nanami)
Voiced by: Suzuko Mimori (Japanese); Tia Ballard (English)
Nanami is a high school girl abandoned by her father due to his gambling debts, leaving her mocked for her poverty. When the land god Mikage passes his role to her, she becomes a fledgling deity with minimal spiritual power. Diligently balancing school and divine duties, she masters her primary weapon, white talismans, and commands a shikigami named Mamoru who shifts between monkey and boy forms to aid her in purifying or banishing evil. Initially, she could not stand Mamoru's taunts, which led to frequent arguments, but over time, she grows closer to him. Though impulsive, her earnestness influences both gods and yōkai. Later, she marries Tomoe, now human, and retires from teaching to raise their son, visiting Mikage Shrine as an adult.
Tomoe (巴衛)
Voiced by: Shinnosuke Tachibana (Japanese); J. Michael Tatum (English)
Tomoe is a powerful fox yōkai who once served as the familiar of the land god Mikage. When Nanami inherits the role, she binds him as her familiar, though he initially resents her. Cynical and mocking, he distrusts others but gradually warms to Nanami, admiring her determination. Though he treats her with playful condescension, he fiercely protects her, refusing to kill in her presence. His abilities include transformation magic and deadly Fox-Fire, though Nanami's commands restrict his power. After realizing his love for her—revealed to be tied to her past self through time travel—he chooses to become human to stay by her side. Years later, they marry, have a son, and revisit Mikage Shrine as a family.
Mikage (ミカゲ)
Voiced by: Akira Ishida (Japanese); Joel McDonald (English)
Mikage is the enigmatic former land god of the shrine, who abandoned his post twenty years prior for unknown reasons. When he encounters a homeless Nanami, he transfers his divine title to her, claiming she is better suited for the role. With light hair, glasses, and a trench coat, he occasionally appears as a butterfly. His true motives remain unclear, though hints suggest he orchestrated events to prove humans and yōkai can love—specifically, that Nanami could reach Tomoe. This plan stems from a past encounter with a time-traveling Nanami, who inadvertently revealed future events, allowing Mikage to set the story in motion.
Kurama (鞍馬)
Voiced by: Daisuke Kishio (Japanese); Sean O'Connor (English)
A popular idol with a "fallen angel" persona, this crow tengu from Mount Kurama initially sought to steal Nanami's godhood by consuming her heart. After being defeated by Tomoe and spared by Nanami, he abandons his plan and befriends her, even offering her shelter when she loses her divine powers. Though he harbors resentment toward Tomoe, he adapts well to human society—more so than other yōkai—and often flirts with Nanami, though he eventually accepts her relationship with Tomoe. After developing ambiguous feelings for Nanami's friend Ami, he returns to Mount Kurama to help select the next Sojobo, leaving his idol career behind but promising to reunite with Ami if she still waits for him. His real name is Shinjūrō (真寿郎).
Mizuki (瑞希)
Voiced by: Nobuhiko Okamoto (Japanese); Micah Solusod (English)
Mizuki is a snake familiar from the submerged Yonomori shrine. After Nanami rescues him from her cruel classmates, he becomes infatuated with her, even briefly kidnapping her in an attempt to force marriage. Though Tomoe intervenes, Nanami pities Mizuki and promises to visit him. He harbors deep resentment toward Tomoe and occasionally manipulates situations to undermine Nanami's growing affection for him. When Nanami sacrifices herself to save Tomoe from a sea demon, Mizuki becomes her familiar to rescue her. While his abilities are limited to brewing exceptional sake, he finds solace in being his true self around Nanami. After Nanami and Tomoe marry, he remains at Mikage shrine, greeting them warmly when they return with their son.
Onikiri (鬼切) and Kotetsu (虎徹)
Voiced by: Natsuyo Atarashi (first season), Naoko Matsui (second season) (Onikiri) and Chika Ōkubo (Kotetsu) (Japanese); Jad Saxton (Onikiri) and Jessie James Grelle (Kotetsu) (English)
The two bald, childlike yōkai attendants at Nanami's shrine who wear masks. Just like Tomoe, they are able to shapeshift. They are extremely fond of Nanami, Tomoe, Mizuki and Mikage. It is implied that there is an unpleasant sight underneath their masks.

=== Yōkai ===
Kirakaburi (煌かぶり)
Voiced by: Takehito Koyasu
A sadistic yōkai serving Akura-ou, he finds beauty in decapitating victims and pairing their heads with flowers. While merciless in killing, he shows loyalty to Akura-ou and avoids challenging stronger opponents like the gods of Izumo. He considers Tomoe beautiful but cold, and despises anything he deems ugly—including the furball that ultimately kills him. Tasked with capturing Yukiji/Nanami (with the sole condition of sparing her head), he falls for Nanami's talisman trick and lets her escape. When Tomoe severely wounds him, the vengeful furball devours him. His arrogance proves fatal as he underestimates those he considers beneath him.
Himemiko of the Swamp (沼皇女, Numano Himemiko; lit. 'Swamp Princess')
Voiced by: Yui Horie (Japanese); Monica Rial (English)
The princess of Tatara Swamp is a catfish yōkai who rules an underwater palace with her fish attendants. Ten years after falling in love with a lost human boy, Kotarō Urashima, she enlists Nanami's help to reunite with him. Nanami disguises her as human, allowing their romance to blossom. Though initially shocked to discover her true nature, Kotarō accepts and apologizes to her. Later pregnant with Kotarō's child (made possible by her temporary human form), she faces opposition from traditionalist attendants who demand she sever human ties. During Nanami's wedding, the couple escapes together rather than be separated, choosing love over tradition.
Dragon King (龍王・宿儺, Ryūō Sukuna)
Voiced by: Daisuke Namikawa (Japanese); Robert McCollum (English)
Dragon Lord of the sea, who has been waiting to seek revenge against Tomoe for 526 years for ripping out his right eye and attacking the north gate of Ryūgū Castle. He found Tomoe after he saved Ami from drowning in the sea. The Dragon Lord's eyes are known as the Longevity Elixir and are said to give great power to whoever drinks them. Though aggressive and temperamental, he is afraid of his wife's anger. He is forced to give up his grudge against Tomoe after his wife befriends Nanami. He is very shocked to learn that Nanami and Tomoe were engaged.
Kamehime (亀姫; lit. 'Turtle Princess')
Voiced by: Akemi Okamura (Japanese); Anastasia Muñoz (English)
The wife of the Dragon King. She disapproves of her husband's fights with Tomoe, partially because she knows he cannot beat Tomoe and only risks hurting himself more. She meets with Nanami by chance and becomes friends with her, further dampening her husbands attempts at combat with Tomoe.
Akura-ou (悪羅王, Akura-Ō)
Voiced by: Junichi Suwabe (Japanese); Brandon Potter (English)
Akura-ou, a yōkai with an indestructible body, once allied with Tomoe in spreading chaos until their partnership fractured over Yukiji's death. Centuries later, he inhabits the body of Kirihito Mori, a deceased boy whose final wish he fulfills. Though regaining some followers, he obsessively seeks his original form. His path crosses with Nanami when he disrupts the God's Summit and later opens the Kyo Gan Mon gate. After falling into Yomi-no-Kuni, Nanami rescues him despite his cruelty. Though he nearly kills her by draining her life force, her compassion leaves him conflicted—particularly when she declares her bond with Tomoe, stirring unfamiliar emotions within him.
Yatori
Voiced by: Hiro Shimono (Japanese); Christopher Guerrero (English)
Once a pitiful, weak yōkai named Furball, Yatori served under Akura-Oh in the olden times. He slowly gained strength by eating those who stood in his, or Akura-Oh's way. He took on a human appearance by possessing one of Yukiji's servants, Sukeroku. He was fiercely loyal to Akura-Oh and when Akura-Oh returned, Yatori sought him out in order to continue serving him.
Jirō (二郎)
Voiced by: Wataru Hatano (Japanese); Andrew T. Chandler (English)
Jirō, the formidable fourth chief of Kurama Mountain, rules the tengu with absolute authority. Known for his merciless leadership, he banishes any showing weakness—as he once did to Kurama in his youth. His harsh demeanor softens after meeting Nanami beneath the ancient sakura tree, though he denies his growing affection. Distracted by thoughts of her, his protective wards weaken—a sign of inner turmoil noted by his servant Yatori. When Yatori's betrayal leads to Nanami being attacked by Raijū, Jirō sacrifices himself to save her, confessing his love in what he believes are his final moments.
Unari (ウナリ)
Unari is a hybrid mermaid-dragon yōkai who rules Okinawa's sea creatures. Her scaled face and horns caused her mother to deem her ugly, forcing her to wear a concealing feather robe. When Akura-Oh steals this fireproof garment (needed to reclaim his body), Nanami retrieves it in exchange for part of her lifespan. During the theft, a furious Unari kidnaps Ami, suspecting her of being involved. Mizuki and Kurama intervene; while Kurama is shocked by Unari's appearance, Mizuki calls her beautiful. They briefly become engaged until Unari recognizes Mizuki's love for Nanami. In a touching farewell, she gifts him her now-unneeded robe as he promises annual visits.

=== Deities ===
Otohiko (乙比古)
Voiced by: Hiroki Takahashi (Japanese); Ian Sinclair (English)
A feminine male wind god. He initially disapproves of Nanami as the land god but acknowledges her after she successfully dispels the miasma that he had released on the shrine.
Narukami (鳴神)
Voiced by: Hyo-sei (Japanese); Lydia Mackay (English)
A bratty, selfish sky god who has an unrequited crush on Tomoe. She steals Nanami's mark, shrinks Tomoe into a toddler, and takes control of the shrine for a short period. She is very demanding and apparently goes through attendants at an unheard-of rate and seems to take sadistic delight in abusing her familiars.
Ookuninushi (大国主, Ōkuninushi)
Voiced by: Showtaro Morikubo (Japanese); Tyson Rinehart (English)
The God of Wealth who owns a large shrine in Izumo. He is in charge of the Divine Assembly held every year for deities. He arranged the trial between the human deities Nanami and Kayako at the God's Summit.
Takehaya Ikuzagami (戦神 建速, Ikuzagami Takehaya)
Voiced by: Yasuaki Takumi (Japanese); Scott Freeman (English)
The War god who is reluctant to acknowledge Nanami, a human to be a Land God.
Koume (小梅) and Kotake (こたけ)
Voiced by: Naoko Sugiura (Japanese); Leah Clark (English) (Koume)
Voiced by: Eri Goda (Japanese); Felecia Angelle (English) (Kotake)
Two of the 32 Dog-Lions of Narukami and are her most loyal servants. The sides of their hair resemble that of dog ears.
Year God (年神)
Voiced by: Ayumu Murase (Japanese); Orion Pitts (English)
He is in charge of changing the year.

=== Other characters ===
Ami Nekota (猫田 あみ, Nekota Ami)
Voiced by: Satomi Satō (Japanese); Alexis Tipton (English)
The first friend Nanami ever made at school. Originally, she found Nanami to be weird, but she also took a liking to Nanami. After Nanami, or rather Tomoe disguised as her, rescued her from a demon, she began to hang around Nanami more and officially became a friend after she helped her talk to Kurama. She made a promise with Kurama to not tell anyone about any of the strange occurrences that happen with Nanami, though it was Tomoe in disguise. Ami believes Nanami is a miko, or shrine maiden. Overall, Ami is a naive but bubbly and gentle girl, and a very reliable friend. She and Kei later find out that Nanami is a god and all the others are yōkai but they accept it quite well. Ami also has a huge crush on Kurama, who has slowly started to return those feelings, but they are not yet in a relationship.
Kei Ueshima (上島 ケイ, Ueshima Kei)
Voiced by: Kaori Shimizu (Japanese); Kristi Kang (English)
Kei is Ami's best friend. After Ami befriends Nanami, she also begins to see Nanami as a friend. Among the trio, she is the most mature, but also the most hot tempered. She is intuitive and picked up on the fact Nanami liked Tomoe. Kei gave advice to Nanami on how she could get his attention. She is rarely ever seen without her cellphone, on which she constantly sends text messages at a rapid pace, of which most of the time she does not even bother to glance at the screen.
Yukiji (雪路)
Voiced by: Suzuko Mimori (TV series), Fumiko Orikasa (Kako-hen) (Japanese); Tia Ballard (English)
Yukiji, Nanami's ancestor, survives a yōkai attack that leaves her with deep hatred for their kind. Though Tomoe believes he loved her in the past, his affections were actually directed at Nanami during her time-traveling encounters. Yukiji later manipulates this connection, using her resemblance to Nanami to secure Tomoe's protection from Akura-ou while carefully avoiding eye contact that might reveal her true identity. When she falls gravely ill, Tomoe steals the Dragon King's eye to cure her. This begins a lineage of women who inherit its power, remaining beautiful and healthy until passing it on to their daughters. This explains Nanami's beauty and why the eye protects her family.
Kotarou Urashima (裏嶋 小太郎, Urashima Kotarou)
Voiced by: Ryōhei Kimura (Japanese); Chris Burnett (English)
A young human boy and Himemiko's love interest. Himemiko requested Nanami to help her to find a way to meet him again. Kotarou was shy around Himemiko when he first met her but, after getting to know her, grew fond of her and eventually fell in love with her. After discovering Himemiko was a yōkai, Kotarou rejected her for lying to him about her true identity. After clearing his thoughts and some persuasion from the Dragon King, he interrupted Himemiko's marriage to Nishiki, and Himemiko's true form emerges while they are escaping. Kotarou shows an amused expression (and almost lost his breath, as they were underwater) before telling Himemiko that he accepts her no matter what her appearance was.
Kumimi Momozono (桃園 クミミ, Momozono Kumimi)
Voiced by: Yuri Amano (Japanese); Jennifer Green (English)
Nanami's mother. Kumimi had died from an unknown disease and left her only daughter Nanami to be responsible for the house-hold, plus her husband (which is Nanami's father) of keeping him in check.
Isobe (磯)
Voiced by: Shuta Morishima (Japanese); Corey Cleary-Stoner (English)
A classmate of Nanami's from school who enjoys picking on her.
Natsuko Umibe (ウミベイ 奈津子, Umibe Natsuko)
Voiced by: Aimi Terakawa (Japanese); Teri Rogers (English)
A classmate of Nanami's from school.
Inaho (稲穂姫)
Voiced by: Yurin (Japanese); Bryn Apprill (English)
A female goddess who is often seen sleeping, as the Fumigae Gods complained that she should have not slept throughout the year if she had known that she would sleep her way through the Izumo gods meeting.

== Media ==
=== Manga ===
Written and illustrated by Julietta Suzuki, Kamisama Kiss was serialized in Hakusensha's semi-monthly shōjo manga magazine Hana to Yume from February 20, 2008, to May 20, 2016. The 149 individual chapters were later collected and published in 25 tankōbon volumes by Hakusensha, released between September 19, 2008, and August 19, 2016.

North American publisher Viz Media licensed the English language distributions rights at the 2009 New York Anime Festival.

==== Volumes ====
No.	Original release date	Original ISBN	English release date	English ISBN
1	September 19, 2008	978-4-59-218506-2	December 7, 2010	978-1-42153-638-5
Chapters 1–6
2	January 1, 2009	978-4-59-218507-9	March 1, 2011	978-1-42153-639-2
Chapters 7–12
3	May 5, 2009	978-4-59-218508-6	June 7, 2011	978-1-42153-640-8
Chapters 13-18
4	September 18, 2009	978-4-59-218509-3	August 2, 2011	978-1-42153-658-3
Chapters 19–24
5	January 19, 2010	978-4-59-218510-9	October 4, 2011	978-1-42153-823-5
Chapters 25–30
6	May 19, 2010	978-4-59-219216-9	December 6, 2011	978-1-42153-886-0
Chapters 31–36
7	September 16, 2010	978-4-59-219217-6	February 7, 2012	978-1-42154-025-2
Chapters 37–42
8	December 17, 2010	978-4-59-219218-3	April 3, 2012	978-1-42154-082-5
Chapters 43–48
9	May 19, 2011	978-4-59-219219-0	June 5, 2012	978-1-42154-198-3
Chapters 49–54
10	September 20, 2011	978-4-59-219220-6	August 7, 2012	978-1-42154-269-0
Chapters 55–60
11	January 20, 2012	978-4-59-219291-6	November 6, 2012	978-1-42154-924-8
Chapters 61–66
12	April 20, 2012	978-4-59-219292-3	February 5, 2013	978-1-42155-082-4
Chapters 67–72
13	September 20, 2012	978-4-592-19293-0	August 6, 2013	978-1-42155-266-8
Chapters 73–79 + 70.5
14	October 19, 2012	978-4-592-19294-7	February 4, 2014	978-1-42155-586-7
Chapters 80–85
15	February 20, 2013	978-4-592-19295-4	June 3, 2014	978-1-42156-308-4
Chapters 86–89 + 89.5
16	August 20, 2013	978-4-592-19296-1	October 7, 2014	978-1-42156-764-8
Chapters 90–95
17	January 20, 2014	978-4-592-19297-8	March 3, 2015	978-1-42157-725-8
Chapters 96–101
18	May 20, 2014	978-4-592-19298-5	June 2, 2015	978-1-42157-970-2
Chapters 102–107
19	September 19, 2014	978-4-592-19299-2	October 6, 2015	978-1-42158-033-3
Chapters 108–113
20	December 19, 2014	978-4-592-19300-5	February 2, 2016	978-1-42158-261-0
Chapters 114–119
21	April 20, 2015	978-4-592-21501-1	June 7, 2016	978-1-42158-522-2
Chapters 120–125
22	August 20, 2015	978-4-592-21502-8	October 4, 2016	978-1-42158-712-7
Chapters 126–131
23	December 18, 2015	978-4-592-21503-5	February 7, 2017	978-1-42159-047-9
Chapters 132–137
24	April 20, 2016	978-4-592-21504-2	June 6, 2017	978-1-42159-221-3
Chapters 138–143
25	August 19, 2016	978-4-592-21505-9	October 3, 2017	978-1-4215-9382-1; 978-1-4215-9848-2 (LE)
Chapters 144–149

=== Anime ===
A 13-episode anime television series adaptation, produced by TMS Entertainment and directed by Akitaro Daichi, was broadcast on TV Tokyo from October 2 to December 25, 2012. (Note: TV Tokyo listed the air dates for the series on Monday at 26:05, which is effectively Tuesday at 2:05 a.m. JST.) The opening theme is "Kamisama Hajimemashita" (神様はじめました) and the ending theme "Kamisama Onegai" (神様お願; lit. 'Please, God'), both performed by Hanae. Two original animation DVD (OAD) episodes were released on August 20, 2013, bundled with the sixteenth manga volume. One of them is based on the story from the fifteenth manga volume, while the other contains an all-new original story. The opening theme is "Kamisama no Kamisama" (神様の神様; lit. 'God of God') and the ending theme "Ototoi Oide" (おとといおいで; lit. '"Come, the Day Before Yesterday'), both performed by Hanae.

A second 12-episode season was broadcast on TV Tokyo from January 6 to March 31, 2015. (Note: TV Tokyo listed the air dates for the series on Monday at 26:05, which is effectively Tuesday at 2:05 a.m. JST.) A four-part OAD, subtitled "Kako-hen" (過去篇; lit. '"Past Arc"'), was released from August 20, 2015, to August 19, 2016. Another OAD, subttitled Kamisama, Shiawase ni Naru (神様、幸せになる), was bundled with the Kamisama Kiss 25.5 official fanbook on December 20, 2016.

The series was licensed in English for streaming and home video by Funimation (later renamed Crunchyroll LLC). Crunchyroll began streaming the OAD episodes in July 2026. In Australia, the series was broadcast on the free-to-air television channel ABC3.

=== Musical ===
A stage musical adaptation titled Kamisama Hajimemashita: The Musical ran from March 21–29, 2015. The musical stars Saki Terashima as Nanami, Ren Yagami as Tomoe, Keisuke Minami as Kurama, and Shōta Takazaki as Mizuki. Additional cast members include Mao Katō as Onikiri, Keita Tokushiro and Hiroki Takaoka double-cast as Kotetsu, and Juria Kawakami as Narukami. Akira Ishida made a cameo reprising his role as Mikage in voice. The musical had a re-run in 2016, with Yūta Higuchi re-cast as Mizuki, LinQ member Yūmi Takaki re-cast as Kotetsu, and Makoto Okunaka re-cast as Narukami.

== Reception ==
Jacob Chapman of Anime News Network describes Kamisama Kiss as a 50/50 cross between Inuyasha and Fruits Basket. The manga had five million copies in print by March 2016.
