= Summertime (Cinnamons and Evening Cinema song) =

- Digital release cover

Single by Cinnamons × Evening Cinema

from the album Confession
- Released: August 7, 2017
- Genre: J-pop
- Length: 4:11
- Songwriter: Natsuki Harada
- Lyricist: Natsuki Harada
- Producer: Natsuki Harada

Cinnamons singles chronology
"Last Scene" (2017)	"Summertime" (2017)	"Noon" (2018)

Evening Cinema singles chronology
"Summertime" (2017)	"Absolutely, It's You" (2019)

Music video
- "Summertime" on YouTube

"Summertime" (stylized in lowercase) is a song by Japanese bands Cinnamons and Evening Cinema, released digitally on August 7, 2017. The song was composed and written by Natsuki Harada, the vocalist, keyboardist, and guitarist of Evening Cinema.

In 2019, "Summertime" went viral in Southeast Asia, and its popularity spread to Japan through TikTok. In 2021, the song was adapted into a novel titled Kimi no Toriko ni Natte Shimaeba, Kitto.

== Background and release ==
"Summertime" is described as a love song. The composition and lyrics to "Summertime" were written by Natsuki Harada, the vocalist, keyboardist, and guitarist of the Japanese band Evening Cinema. Harada stated that, while composing "Summertime", he did not know how to compose music. He drew influences from J-pop songs from the 1980s, and while he did not intend to make "Summertime" a city pop song, the song became associated with the city pop revival in the late 2010s due to its association with the 1980s.

Evening Cinema collaborated with Japanese band Cinnamons, with vocals performed by Harada and Mariko Suzuki from Cinnamons. In 2022, Harada stated that, at that point, Evening Cinema had been doing live performances with Cinnamons often, and the idea for collaboration had spontaneously occurred at an after-party after one of their joint live shows.

"Summertime" was released digitally on August 7, 2017, on an independent label. It was later released physically on CD as a double A-side single with the song "Tokimeki of Winter" on December 12, 2018. A version of "Summertime" (サマータイム; titled in katakana) with a new arrangement was released on Evening Cinema's 2018 studio album Confession. In 2017, "Summertime" was featured in a commercial for the chat novel mobile app DMM Teller.

== Music video ==
The music video for "Summertime" was animated by Tsukunem (credited as Tsukunejirou), who also provided the illustrations to the single's cover. The animation features a man and a woman on a drive by the coast who are cast under a love spell.

== Cultural impact ==
"Summertime" received little interest during its initial release in 2017. "Summertime" went viral in Southeast Asia between the end of 2019 and the beginning of 2020, where it ranked no. 1 and no. 2 on the Spotify Virtual Charts in Vietnam and the Philippines respectively. In 2020, the song went viral on TikTok, inspiring song and dance covers. It became known under the hashtag "#KimiNoToriko", or "#KimiNoTorikoNi" (#君の虜に; lit. "Only if I could just fall for you") in Japanese, from the song's opening lyrics. By July 2020, it was the most used song on TikTok in Indonesia, Singapore, the Philippines, and Myanmar. The popularity of "Summertime" in on TikTok led to the song gaining more traction in Japan. Despite Harada's lack of intent to make "Summertime" a city pop song, he attributed its popularity to the city pop revival in the late 2010s, as well as the music video being animated.

By the end of 2020, "Summertime" ranked no. 7 on Spotify's Most Played Songs by Japanese Artists Overseas. The song won the TikTok Buzzwords Award 2020 in the music category for the hashtag "#KimiNoTorikoNi". In 2023, "Summertime" was nominated in the category for Top Streaming Music of the Decade at the Independent Artist Awards by TuneCore.

== Other versions ==
=== Remixes ===
On June 25, 2021, Evening Cinema released "Summertime (Evening Cinema Remix)" as a digital single. The remix was released for the merchandise collaboration between "Summertime" and Usagikyuuun!, a character created by Japanese company Quan. A short music video animated by Tsukunem, who did the original artwork and music video for "Summertime", was also released for the remix and merchandise collaboration line.

On July 23, 2021, Maeshima Soshi released "Summertime (Maeshima Soshi Remix)" as a digital single.

=== Cover versions ===
Indonesian YouTuber Rainych released a cover version of "Summertime", which became one of the most popular cover versions of the song on YouTube. Harada was later asked to arrange a cover version of Miki Matsubara's 1979 song "Mayonaka no Door (Stay with Me)" for her, and Evening Cinema later produced her Japanese debut single "Ride on Time", a cover version of Tatsuro Yamashita's 1980 song.

In April 2021, a vocal audition was held on the Japanese streaming platform Mix Channel for a new cover version of "Summertime" arranged by Harada. The winner was Suu, a streamer on Mix Channel, and her version, titled "Summertime (Kimi no Toriko ni)", was released in July 2021.

== Adaptations ==
On May 19, 2021, "Summertime" was adapted into a novel titled Kimi no Toriko ni Natte Shimaeba, Kitto (君の虜になってしまえば、きっと; lit. "Only If I Could Just Fall in Love with You") after the song's opening lyrics. Written by Aira and illustrated by Kaori Minato, the story was serialized on the mobile app Peep.
