= Hanae (singer) =

Japanese singer (born 1994)

Hanae ハナエ
- Born: 27 February 1994 (age 32); Fukuoka Prefecture, Japan
- Genres: J-pop
- Occupations: Singer; lyricist; composer
- Instruments: Vocals; piano; guitar
- Years active: 2011–
- Label: Virgin Music
- Website: hanae-web.com

Hanae (ハナエ; born 27 February 1994, in Fukuoka Prefecture) is a Japanese singer. Her affiliated office in which she belongs to is Ken-On, and her record label is Virgin Music.

== Biography ==
At the age of thirteen, Hanae sent a demo tape to the audition "Great Hunting" of EMI Music Japan. There was a contact from the EMI side and it was told that she does "not have anything right now due to being young on age, but I want you to listen when I can play a song."

On 1 June 2011, Hanae released the single "Hane" from EMI Music Japan, and made her major debut.

On 14 November 2012, her third single "Kamisama hajimemashita / Kamisama Onegai" was released. The song did not use Hanae's own music for the first time. It was instead produced by Shuichi Mabe (ex. Sōtaisei Riron, Shinkō Hōkō Betsu Tsūkō Kubun, Azer & Baejang).

In December 2012, Hanae was selected in the cover of Shiseido's corporate culture magazine Hana Tsubaki (merger number January/February 2015) which celebrated its 76th anniversary.

On 27 November 2013, her first album Jikkai Quiz was released.

On 9 February 2014, in commemoration of the release of her first album Hanae went to Harajuku Astro Hall for her first one-man live Hanae 1st One Man Live –Hanae no Jikkai–.

On 30 August 2014, she held an event organized by Shibuya WWW Hanae*Fes 2014 –Natsume no tsume ato Heart.

== Discography ==
=== Singles ===
No.	Year	Title
1	2011	Hane
2	2012	Black Berry
3	2012	Kamisama hajimemashita / Kamisama Onegai
4	2013	Boyz & Girlz
5	2013	Koi wa Shinsei Roman
6	2013	Juvenile!!!!
7	2015	Kamisama no Kamisama / Ototoi oide

=== Albums ===
No.	Year	Title
1	2013	Jikkai Quiz
2	2015	Jyoukyousyouko
3	2016	Show Girl
4	2025	So Close To Yasmin

=== Videography ===
Music videos

Director	Song title
Eri Sawatari	"Boyz & Girlz"
Daisuke Shimada	"Black Berry"
Muniel Nakamura	"Juvenile!!!!"
Nobuaki Hongo	"Koi wa Shinsei Roman"
Yunikotori	"Hane"
Unknown	"Kamisama hajimemashita"
Unknown	"Chī sana Koi no monogatari"

Tie-ups

Song title	Tie-up	Ref.
Hane	TV drama Good Life: Arigatō, Papa. Sayonara insert song	
Black Berry	Fuji TV Gout Temps Nouveau ending theme	
Kamisama hajimemashita	anime television series Kamisama Kiss opening theme	
Kamisama Onegai	anime television series Kamisama Kiss ending theme	
Juvenile!!!!	anime television series Tanken Driland ending theme	
Kamisama no Kamisama	anime television series Kamisama Kiss (season 2) opening theme	
Ototoi oide	anime television series Kamisama Kiss (season 2) ending theme	
Aoi sora	Bourbon "Kajitsu no Haitta Zeitaku Solve" advert song	

== Filmography ==
=== Anime television ===
Year	Title	Role	Network	Ref.
2012	Kamisama Kiss	Hanae	TV Tokyo	
2013	Tanken Driland	Flower selling daughter · Hanae	TV Tokyo	

=== Live ===
Year	Title	Ref.
2014	Hana*Fes 2014 –Natsu no tsume ato–	
2014	Hanae Christmas Live –2014-Nen no Christmas Live wa Hanae ni Sasagemasu.–	
2015	One Man Live –Kamigyō Shōko, Kakunin shite mi?–	

=== Events ===
Year	Title	Ref.
2012	Great Hunting Night Vol 40 Girls Atack Special	
2013	Ani uta Kitakyushu × A3 2013	
2013	Kawaii!! Matsuri	
2013	FM-Fuji 25th Anniversary "Girls Girls Girls" Dai 5-kai Bangumi Kōkai Rokuon Live 5th Kiss!!!!	
2013	Yatsui Festival! 2013	
2013	Great Hunting Night Vol. 45	
2013	Aomori Rock Festival '13 –Natsu no Mamono–	
2013	Daikanyama Look Presents "Negi Road Vol'8"	
2013	Harajuku Kawaii!! Fes 2013 in Okinawa	
2013	Japan Institute of Technology Music College presents Sotsugyō Live 2013 "Re:Thank You"	
2013	Uta Musume X'mas Live 2013	
2014	Yuya Tsuji Presents Eternal Rock City. 2014	
2014	Frenaez Gakuen: Ki ni naru Tenkōsei Vol. 1 "Himitsu no Nijihōteishiki"	
2014	Yatsui Festival! 2014	
2014	Moshimoshi Nippon Festival 2014	
2014	Great Hunting Night Special Daiichiwa "Great Hunting Daichi ni Tatsu!!"	
2014	Ani uta Xmas Live 2014	
