= Yuno Nagao =

Japanese actress (born 2016)

- 永尾 柚乃
- Born: October 15, 2016 (age 10)
- Occupation: Actress
- Years active: 2018–present
- Agent: Space Craft

Yuno Nagao (Japanese: 永尾 柚乃, Hepburn: Nagao Yuno; born October 15, 2016) is a Japanese actress from Tokyo, affiliated with Space Craft.

== Biography ==
Yuno Nagao started her career as a child actress in a TV drama Cold Case: Shinjitsu no Tobira (2018). In 2023, she appeared in a TV drama Rebooting as Kondo Asami (as her younger self).

She was revealed as the main character, director, writer, and editor of the 2027 film Lita.

== Filmography ==
=== Television ===
Year	Title	Role	Notes	Ref.
2023	Rebooting	Asami Kondo (young)		
2024	What Will You Do, Ieyasu?	Hisamatsu Toshikatsu's daughter	Taiga drama	
2024	Golden Kamuy: The Hunt of Prisoners in Hokkaido	Osoma		
2025	The Kidnapping Day	Rin Nanase		

=== Film ===
Year	Title	Role	Notes	Ref.
2024	Golden Kamuy	Osoma		
2027	The High School Family	Haruka Ietani		
2027	Lita	Lita	Lead role; also director, writer and editor	

=== Japanese dub ===
==== Live-action ====
Year	Title	Role	Dub for	Notes	Ref.
2025	Lilo & Stitch	Lilo Pelekai	Maia Kealoha		

==== Animation ====
Year	Title	Role	Notes	Ref.
2026	Little Amélie or the Character of Rain	Amélie		
2026	Lilo & Scratch	Lilo Pelekai	Short film	
