= Harper's Island =

American horror mystery television series

- Genre: Murder mystery; Horror; Drama; Thriller; Slasher
- Created by: Ari Schlossberg
- Starring: Elaine Cassidy; Christopher Gorham; Katie Cassidy; Cameron Richardson; Adam Campbell; C.J. Thomason; Jim Beaver
- Composer: David Lawrence
- Country of origin: United States
- Original language: English
- No. of seasons: 1
- No. of episodes: 13

Production
- Executive producers: Jeffrey Jackson Bell; Ari Schlossberg; Jon Turteltaub
- Producers: Jill E. Blotevogel; Grace Gilroy; Keira Morrisette; Robert Sizemore; Lindsay Sturman
- Production locations: Bowen Island, British Columbia; Vancouver, British Columbia
- Cinematography: Robert McLachlan
- Running time: 42–45 minutes
- Production companies: Junction Entertainment; CBS Paramount Network Television

Original release
- Network: CBS
- Release: April 9 – July 11, 2009

Harper's Island is an American horror mystery limited series created by Ari Schlossberg for CBS. Schlossberg, Jeffrey Jackson Bell and Jon Turteltaub served as executive producers. The series features an ensemble cast led by Elaine Cassidy alongside Christopher Gorham, Katie Cassidy, Cameron Richardson, Adam Campbell, C.J. Thomason, and Jim Beaver. The plot follows a group of family and friends that travel to the titular locale for a destination wedding, only to learn that there is a killer among them.

The series premiered on April 9, 2009, and was marketed as a thirteen-week limited event. The final two episodes aired on July 11. The first three episodes aired on Thursdays, but was moved to Saturdays thereafter. Because of this, Global premiered the following episodes in Canada two days prior to the United States. A companion web series, Harper's Globe, was released concurrently.

The series was initially intended to be an anthology series featuring a new setting and characters in the second season. However, on July 14, 2009, CBS cancelled the series after one season. The series later received favorable retrospective assessments, with critics describing it as a cult favorite and as being ahead of its time for its seasonal anthology format.

== Plot ==
Seven years after John Wakefield murders six people on Harper’s Island, Abby Mills returns for the first time since her mother’s death to attend the wedding of her childhood best friend, Henry Dunn, and his fiancée, Trish Wellington. As their family and friends gather at the Candlewick Inn, members of the wedding party begin disappearing and are murdered without the others’ knowledge. When the killings are finally discovered, the survivors find themselves isolated on the island and targeted by an assailant connected to Wakefield, forcing Abby to confront the circumstances surrounding the original massacre.

== Cast and characters ==
=== Main ===
- Elaine Cassidy as Abby Mills, the groom's best friend
- Christopher Gorham as Henry Dunn, the fiancé of Trish Wellington
- Katie Cassidy as Patricia 'Trish' Wellington, the bride-to-be
- Gina Holden as Shea Allen, Trish's older sister and maid of honor
- Cameron Richardson as Chloe Carter, a bridesmaid one of Trish's bridesmaids
- Adam Campbell as Cal Vandeusen, Chloe's boyfriend and a doctor
- Matt Barr as Christopher "Sully" Sullivan, Henry's best man
- C.J. Thomason as Jimmy Mance, a local fisherman and Abby's high school sweetheart
- Jim Beaver as Charlie Mills, the sheriff on Harper's Island and Abby's father

=== Recurring ===
- Richard Burgi as Thomas Wellington, a real estate mogul and Trish and Shea's father
- Victor Webster as Hunter Jennings, Trish's ex-college boyfriend
- Dean Chekvala as J.D. Dunn, Henry's brother
- Harry Hamlin as "Uncle" Marty Dunn, Henry and J.D.'s uncle and surrogate father
- David Lewis as Richard Allen, Shea's husband
- Cassandra Sawtell as Madison Allen, Shea and Richard's daughter
- Claudette Mink as Katherine Wellington, Trish and Shea's stepmother
- Brandon Jay McLaren as Danny Brooks, a groomsman and Henry's best friend from college
- Chris Gauthier as Malcolm Ross, a groomsman
- Sean Rogerson as Joel Booth, a groomsman
- Amber Borycki as Beth Barrington, a bridesmaid and Trish's former college roommate
- Sarah Smyth as Lucy Daramour, a bridesmaid and one of Trish's childhood friends
- Ben Cotton as Shane Pierce, a local fisherman who pretty much hates everyone
- Anna Mae Routledge as Kelly Seaver, Shane's ex-girlfriend
- Ali Liebert as Nikki Bolton, Abby's friend who manages The Cannery
- Beverly Elliott as Maggie Krell, the manager of The Candlewick Inn
- Callum Keith Rennie as John Wakefield, the perpetrator of the 2001 murders

=== Guest ===
- Julia Anderson as Tyra Coulter, a police officer from Seattle who is new to the force
- Jay Brazeau as Ike Campbell, a medical examiner
- Nicholas Carella as Patrick Lillis, the sheriff's deputy
- Clint Carleton as Ben Wellington, Trish and Shea's cousin and Thomas' nephew
- Chilton Crane as Karena Fox, a local psychic medium
- Terrence Kelly as Reverend Fain, the priest of the church
- Melanie Merkosky as Robin Matthews, newly hired journalist and main character of the Harper's Globe online series
- Maxine Miller as Julia Mitchell, a local elderly woman
- Aaron Pearl as Deputy Garrett, the sheriff's other deputy and jail guard
- Sarah-Jane Redmond as Sarah Mills, mother of Abby and wife of the sheriff, one of the victims of the 2001 murders
- Michael Rogers as Darryl Riggens, a police officer from Seattle
- Dean Wray as Cole Harkin, the survivor of the 2001 murders and the sheriff's former deputy

== Episodes ==
No.	Title	Directed by	Written by	Canadian air date	U.S. air date	U.S. viewers (millions)
1	"Whap"	Jon Turteltaub	Ari Schlossberg	April 9, 2009	April 9, 2009	10.21
In 2001, John Wakefield murdered six people on Harper's Island off the coast of Seattle. Seven years later, guests gather on the ferry to Harper's Island for the wedding of Henry Dunn and Trish Wellington. Trish's cousin, Ben Wellington, is missing, but they decide to go anyway. Unbeknownst to those on board, Ben has been tied to the drive shaft of the boat and is dismembered by the propeller when the engine starts. On the voyage to the Island, Henry and his life-long best friend, Abby Mills, discuss her concerns about the trip; her mother was one of the victims John Wakefield murdered seven years earlier. Marty, Henry's uncle, arrives with a concealed bag containing $250,000 and a gun. The party arrives at The Candlewick Inn and Abby reacquaints with Maggie, the Inn's manager, and Nikki, a local bartender and her childhood friend. Hunter Jennings, Trish's ex-boyfriend, arrives in secret on the Island per Mr. Wellington's summons, intending to break up Trish's marriage to Henry. Uncle Marty confronts Mr. Wellington about these plans and his treatment of Henry. Later, Marty falls through a footbridge and is cut in half. Abby returns to her room to find a newspaper article taped to her bathroom mirror about her mother's murder by Wakefield.
2	"Crackle"	Sanford Bookstaver	Jeffrey Bell	April 16, 2009	April 16, 2009	7.82
Trish meets with Hunter again and reaffirms her intention of marrying Henry. Reverend Fain is caught in a rope trap and decapitated in the woods. A festive scavenger hunt begins at the Candlewick Inn and Abby meets Kelly, another local whose mother was murdered by John Wakefield. Trish confides in Lucy that Hunter is on the island and is unsure of what to do. In an effort to thwart Sully's advances on Chloe, Cal ventures out alone in the woods to find them and he is caught in a rope trap. Sully finds Cal and leaves to seek help but neglects to do so. Chloe expresses her concern that Cal is still missing and Sully leads them to him. To maintain peace between local Shane and J.D., Henry's brother, Henry extends an invitation to Jimmy and Shane to attend the beach party that evening. Henry arrives back at his room to discover a deer's head in his bathtub. Nikki, a bartender and Abby's friend, arrives at Kelly's house but finds her dead, hanging from the rafters. Shane arrives and is punched by Henry for the prank. During their altercation, Lucy's dog scampers off into the woods. Running after her, Lucy falls into a pit where she is set on fire.
3	"Ka-Blam"	Steve Boyum	Jill E. Blotevogel	April 23, 2009	April 23, 2009	7.02
Sheriff Mills informs Abby that Kelly committed suicide but she refuses to believe it. When Abby informs J.D. of her death, he does not react; leaving Abby concerned and suspicious because she saw him with Kelly on the night that she died. Shane immediately suspects J.D. and captures him. Henry discovers that Trish's ex-boyfriend, Hunter Jennings, is staying at a nearby hotel. Forging Hunter's signature, Henry sends Trish a note to meet him at a room in the Candlewick Inn. Trish approaches the door to the hotel room, but she hesitates and leaves. Inside the hotel room, Henry smiles to himself. Abby goes to Shane's house and finds J.D. held captive in his barn. Abby tries to persuade Shane that Kelly died, not by suicide, but was murdered at the hands of John Wakefield. Sheriff Mills arrives, saving Abby and J.D, and arresting Shane. That evening at dinner, Trish and Henry present a unified front to her father. Hunter blackmails Mr. Wellington, threatening to tell Trish of their arrangement unless Mr. Wellington pays him $50,000. Mr. Wellington agrees and Hunter leaves the Island with his money. As he sails away from Harper's Island, Hunter is killed by a rigged shotgun on the boat.
4	"Bang"	Guy Bee	Lindsay Sturman	April 30, 2009	May 2, 2009	4.61
Jimmy and Abby reminisce and begin to rekindle their relationship. Abby visits the local newspaper, Harper's Globe, and discovers uncollected old editions featuring stories about the Wakefield murders. While out fishing, Henry and his groomsmen come across Hunter's boat. They discover his body and the bag of money with the gun. While deliberating on whether or not to report it, Malcolm rashly sinks the boat instead, taking the money and gun. When they return to the Candlewick Inn, the men agree to conceal the $250,000. Booth is chosen to bury the money and Malcolm follows him. Booth accidentally shoots himself in the leg and bleeds to death. Malcolm hides the bag of money in his room. Trish discovers that Richard and Katherine, her stepmother, are having an affair. At the bachelorette party, a tarot reader warns Abby that she must leave the island. Abby goes to Jimmy's house and stays the night. A drunk Trish falls into the hotel swimming pool and becomes trapped when the pool cover closes. Trish begins to drown before Richard arrives and resuscitates her.
5	"Thwack"	Steve Gomer	Tyler Bensinger	May 7, 2009	May 9, 2009	4.60
The day before the wedding, Henry encourages Trish to spend time with her father while he handles the final preparations. Later, he finds a decaying animal carcass on the altar. Deducing that J.D. is responsible, Henry confronts him and tells him that he never wants to see him again. J.D. foreshadows that he has "one more surprise" for Henry. Meanwhile, Sheriff Mills and his deputy investigate the disappearance of Reverend Fain. Their search ends when they dredge up his dismembered body from water by fishing line. Abby visits her father's house and discovers newspaper articles about John Wakefield. She reasons that her father suspects that either Wakefield is still alive or a copycat killer is amiss. On a bike ride in the woods, Trish and her father trip a swinging log booby trap that knocks them off their bikes. Trish angrily reveals Katherine's affair before they come upon a figure in the woods who sets a German Shepherd on them. They kill the dog in a struggle, then escape and return to the Candlewick Inn. At the wedding rehearsal, Henry stands with Trish and Mr. Wellington at the altar. When Abby turn off the lights, a head spade inserted into the chandelier above Henry, Trish, and Thomas drops from the fixture and pierces Wellington's skull.
6	"Sploosh"	James Whitmore, Jr.	Robert Levine	May 21, 2009	May 23, 2009	3.85
Sheriff Mills commences his investigation into Mr. Wellington's murder and soon deduces that someone wanted him, specifically, dead. Henry tells Abby about J.D.'s possible involvement in Wellington's murder. J.D. denies his involvement in the murder and restates the idea that Wakefield is still alive. J.D leads Abby into the woods to reveal the body of Uncle Marty tied up in a tree. They tell Henry about Marty's murder and their belief that Wakefield, or a copycat killer, could be involved in it and other recent deaths. Abby takes Henry to her father's attic to show the research on Wakefield. They confront Sheriff Mills, who continues to reassure them that he shot Wakefield dead. J.D does not believe him and decides to dig up Wakefield's grave, but is locked in the pantry. As the Sheriff questions the wedding party, Abby and Henry dig up Wakefield's grave to find human remains. At the Inn, Madison lets J.D. out of the pantry who escapes to the cabin of a disfigured man. Sheriff Mills starts to suspect Richard for the murders due to his affair with Katherine Wellington and the discovery of newspapers documenting Wakefield in his belongings. Richard admits that his affair with Katherine was in effort to humiliate his father-in-law. Afterward, knowing that he is the prime suspect, Richard calls his lawyer. While is on the phone, Richard gets harpooned through the chest.
7	"Thrack, Splat, Sizzle"	Scott Peters	Jeffrey Bell	May 28, 2009	May 30, 2009	3.82
Seven years earlier, Abby prepares to go camping with her boyfriend, Jimmy. An explosion at the dock leaves Cole Harkin, a local, disfigured. Abby is told by her father to return home but is unable find her mother. Abby witnesses Wakefield murdering a man and runs away to find her mother and two others hanged. Following the murders, Sheriff Mills sends Abby off the island despite her protests. In the present, Abby accompanies Trish to identify Mr. Wellington's body. At her father's house, Abby is startled by Cole, who tells her that her father can not be trusted and tells her to ask her father why Wakefield came to the island. Sheriff Mills reveals that Abby's mother fled to the island to escape her abusive relationship with Wakefield. After Mills had Wakefield wrongfully imprisoned following a violent confrontation with his deputies, Wakefield later returned to the island seeking revenge. Malcolm stresses over the possibility that police will find the bag of cash he's concealing. He evades discovery until Sully and Danny arrive. After the two inflict guilt over Booth's death because of Malcolm's desperation for cash, Malcolm goes to the basement of the Candlewick Inn to burn the money in the garbage incinerator. Malcolm is then murdered and his body is discarded in the fire. Later, while worrying about her father's disappearance, Madison is lured to a vacant room of the Inn and taken.
8	"Gurgle"	Rick Bota	Tyler Bensinger	June 4, 2009	June 6, 2009	3.56
The wedding party are preparing to leave Harper's Island when Shea announces that Madison is missing and several stay behind to help find her. Back at the police station, J.D. and Shane fight in the cells where they are locked up. Deputy Garrett attempts to break up the fight until an assailant kills Garrett and destroys the shortwave radio. J.D. manages to escape, leaving Shane locked in the cells. While looking for Madison, the wedding party find Malcolm's skull in the incinerator and Richard's body. Abby gets a phone call from Madison's phone, saying if anyone leaves the island Madison will die. The power goes out across the island and phone reception stops working. In the woods, Sheriff Mills tries to find Cole Harkin but his leg is badly injured in a booby trap and Cole helps him to the cabin. In the cabin, Cole Harkin tells Sheriff Mills that he has found Wakefield's journal and goes off to get help before he is killed by an arrow. He drops the journal and a lantern, starting a fire. After freeing Shane, Abby and Jimmy rescue Sheriff Mills and the journal from the fire. Henry and Danny manage to activate the generator. Sully, Beth, Cal and Chloe try to escape from the island but Cal convinces them to stay for Madison's safety. Sheriff Mills orders Abby and Jimmy to leave the island. At the marina, Abby finds J.D. with his stomach cut open and Henry, weeping and covered in J.D.'s blood.
9	"Seep"	Craig R. Baxley	Nichelle Tramble Spellman	June 11, 2009	June 13, 2009	3.20
After reading John Wakefield's journal, Abby suspects she could be his daughter, causing the group to distrust her and each other. After denying Abby a place inside the Inn, Shane is attacked by Henry but restrained by his friends. After Cal and Chloe attend to Sheriff Mills' leg injury, the two have sex in a separate room. Later, they find Sheriff Mills is missing. Sully and Danny search for Beth and start following a trail of blood, which leads them to a tunnel system. Danny finds Beth's body in one of the tunnels as Abby gets trapped in a separate tunnel while also attempting to locate Beth. Abby finds Madison in a safe room and attempts to escape the tunnels, only to be found by Trish and Shea, who were driving to see the tarot reader. Meanwhile, Shane discovers Katherine dead.
10	"Snap"	Steve Boyum	Christine Roum	June 18, 2009	June 20, 2009	3.79
Madison leads the group to believe that Sheriff Mills is the man who kidnapped her, causing them to suspect that he is in fact the murderer. The group decides to leave the island on Jimmy's boat, but the dock explodes, destroying the boats and seemingly killing Jimmy. The group takes refuge at The Cannery, where Nikki shows up in fear. Later, Maggie decides to leave and is later hanged outside. After creating a diversion, Cal and Sully are able to take Nikki's car to get to Cal's sailboat. Sheriff Mills' truck delivers an unconscious Jimmy to the group. Madison reveals to Trish and Shea she was told to accuse Sheriff Mills of kidnapping her. Abby returns to the Candlewick Inn, where she finds her father. She blames him for the murders, but he tells her it has been Wakefield all this time. Sheriff Mills is hanged and Wakefield reveals himself to Abby.
11	"Splash"	Rick Bota	Dan Shotz	June 25, 2009	June 27, 2009	3.53
After threatening Abby, Wakefield arrives at The Cannery and kills Nikki. Wakefield kills Shane as Trish, Shea, Chloe, and Madison escape to Sheriff Mills' house and hide in the attic. The group convene at the church where Wakefield kidnaps Chloe. Jimmy regains consciousness and the group decides to split up to block off the exits to the tunnels Wakefield is using to get around the island. Danny and Sully encounter Wakefield and decide to enter the tunnels. In the woods, Cal finds and rescues Chloe while Abby and Henry chase Wakefield. After rescuing Chloe, Cal proposes to her. Wakefield appears and kills Cal, then throws him off the bridge. Chloe, hanging on the barrier rail, lets go and falls to her death. Shea discovers that Sheriff Mills thought Wakefield had an accomplice, and suspects Jimmy based on his police file.
12	"Gasp"	Seith Mann	Christine Roum & Robert Levine	July 9, 2009	July 11, 2009	3.63
The group capture Wakefield and lock him in the police station. Shea reveals that Sheriff Mills kept Jimmy's police file, causing the group to analyze Jimmy's behavior and his survival from the dock explosion. Jimmy alerts the group that Trish has fallen off a cliff. Wakefield reveals to Abby that he loved her mother but she gave Wakefield's son up for adoption before he eventually found him. Jimmy, Henry, Abby, and Sully rescue Trish, who has discovered a radio in a boat house. The group are able to contact the coast guard who state they are sending help. Two coast guards arrive at the marina but are shot dead. Wakefield escapes from his cell and kills Danny while Shea and Madison escape. Wakefield chases Trish from the Inn and she finds Henry. He reveals that he is Wakefield's accomplice, kills Trish and greets Wakefield as his father.
13	"Sigh"	Sanford Bookstaver	Jeffrey Bell	July 9, 2009	July 11, 2009	4.05
Abby and Jimmy find Trish's body while Sully sends Shea and Madison off towards Seattle on a small boat. Henry takes Sully to find Trish and reveals the truth before killing him. Abby and Jimmy reunite with Henry and enter the church where Trish's body is. Wakefield attacks Jimmy while Abby escapes. Henry finds Abby and kills Wakefield. Abby discovers that he is the accomplice before she is knocked unconscious. Shea and Madison are informed that they are the only survivors, other than a handful of locals. Abby awakens in a house where Henry explains that they are half-siblings, alluding to their childhood promise to live alone together on the island. Attempting to escape, she finds Jimmy, who is tied up. Abby deduces that Henry had Jimmy sign a full confession, framing him as Wakefield's accomplice, in exchange for keeping Abby safe. As Jimmy attempts to unlock himself, Abby leads Henry on a chase, where she tells him that she doesn't want him before Henry and Jimmy fall off a cliff. While checking on Jimmy, Henry walks up behind Abby and she stabs him. Abby and Jimmy are rescued from the island before a montage is shown of congratulatory video recordings given by Trish, Sully, Malcolm, Danny, Booth, Cal, Chloe, Abby, and Henry.

== Production ==
=== Development and writing ===
In a 2017 retrospective, Jon Turteltaub and Ari Schlossberg recalled that Turteltaub's production company met with several writers while developing a serialized drama intended to tell a complete story over one season. The company selected Schlossberg, who devised the premise of a destination wedding at which members of an ensemble cast could gradually be killed. Schlossberg pitched the project to CBS and wrote the pilot presentation, which Turteltaub directed. CBS commissioned the presentation in March 2008.

CBS ordered Harper's Island to series on May 12, 2008, as part of its 2008–09 television schedule. Later that month, while the project was being retooled, Jeffrey Bell was hired as its executive producer and showrunner. Bell wrote the first episode and oversaw the series with Turteltaub, while Schlossberg, Karim Zreik and Dan Shotz served as co-executive producers.

Zreik later recalled that the series had been pitched as a 10- to 13-episode event. Although its first season would tell a self-contained story, subsequent seasons could have featured different characters and settings without being narratively connected to it. Some major plot details remained undecided after production began. According to Schlossberg, the writers initially had not determined whether John Wakefield was still alive. Around the sixth episode, they decided to reveal that Wakefield had survived and was helping Henry Dunn carry out the murders. Christopher Gorham, who played Henry, was informed of his character's involvement before filming the eighth episode.

=== Casting ===
Elaine Cassidy, Ryan Merriman and Samantha Noble were cast as Abby Mills, Henry Dunn and Trish Wellington, respectively, in the original presentation. During the subsequent retooling, Gorham was cast as Henry, while Katie Cassidy replaced Noble as Trish.

Harry Hamlin was cast as Marty Dunn, who is killed during the premiere. Schlossberg later explained that the producers wanted a recognizable actor for the role so that killing the character early would demonstrate that prominent cast members were not necessarily safe.

=== Filming ===
Principal photography was based in Vancouver and ran from August 8, 2008, to January 28, 2009. The production also filmed on Bowen Island. Cast member Adam Campbell later described regularly travelling there by boat from Vancouver.

Zreik recalled that departing cast members were normally informed of their characters' deaths shortly before receiving the relevant scripts. Where possible, he arranged for a character's death scene to be filmed on the actor's final working day.

According to Zreik, the story takes place over approximately five or six days, although filming continued through several seasons. This created continuity problems when weather conditions changed. Cassidy's final scene, for example, was filmed during snowy weather in December, requiring the crew to remove and melt the snow before filming.

== Reception ==
=== Ratings ===
Despite falling ratings, CBS aired all Harper's Island episodes, although the show was moved from its original night and time to Saturdays. At the end of the 2008-2009 television season the show ranged at #50 being viewed in approximately 9,360,000 homes in North America.

In Australia, Harper's Island ratings were very low, being beaten by competing shows on other networks. Throughout its run, the series alternated times slots. In Canada, the show continued to air Thursday nights on Global Television Network. In Denmark, Harper's Island was moved after episode 5 from Thursdays at 10:50 pm to around midnight. In Ireland the show stayed on its original Monday night airing at 10:00 pm. In the United Kingdom, the show's ratings started off under average but as the series progressed it became the BBC Three channel's number one show on Sundays, and therefore maintained the 9:00 pm slot. In Finland, the program was aired at 9:00 pm during the whole season. The series has been aired multiple times on Malaysia's RTM channel tv2, every Wednesday and Thursday nights airing at midnight.

No.	Episode	Air date	Rating	Share	Rating/share (18–49)	Viewers (millions)
1	"Whap"	April 9, 2009	6.5	11	2.6/8	10.21
2	"Crackle"	April 16, 2009	5.1	9	2.2/6	7.82
3	"Ka-Blam"	April 23, 2009	4.7	9	1.9/5	7.02
4	"Bang"	May 2, 2009	3.1	6	1.0/3	4.61
5	"Thwack"	May 9, 2009	3.1	6	1.1/3	4.60
6	"Sploosh"	May 23, 2009	2.5	5	1.0/4	3.85
7	"Thrack, Splat, Sizzle"	May 30, 2009	2.4	5	0.9/3	3.62
8	"Gurgle"	June 6, 2009	2.4	5	0.9/3	3.56
9	"Seep"	June 13, 2009	2.0	4	0.8/3	3.20
10	"Snap"	June 20, 2009	2.4	5	0.9/4	3.79
11	"Splash"	June 27, 2009	2.4	5	0.8/3	3.53
12	"Gasp"	July 11, 2009	2.4	5	0.8/3	3.63
13	"Sigh"	July 11, 2009	2.6	5	1.0/3	4.05

== Critical response ==
On Rotten Tomatoes, the first season holds an approval rating of 65% based on 26 reviews. The website's critics consensus reads, "Grisly horror trumps amateurish dialogue, making Harper's Island a thrill to watch." Metacritic, which uses a weighted average, assigned the series a score of 63 out of 100 based on 22 critics, indicating "generally favorable reviews".

=== Contemporary reviews ===
Several critics praised the series' self-contained format and ability to generate suspense. Tom Shales of The Washington Post called it a "cunningly constructed, habit-forming mystery" and an intriguing departure from conventional episodic television, although he considered characterization secondary to the plot. Tim Goodman of the San Francisco Chronicle similarly regarded the guaranteed conclusion as part of the series' appeal. He described it as "ghoulish and scary fun" and believed the writing was sufficiently clever to sustain its weekly-murder premise.

Mary McNamara of the Los Angeles Times considered the pilot promising for horror viewers, praising its tension and the performances of Elaine Cassidy, C. J. Thomason and Christopher Gorham. However, she found its graphic violence gratuitous and argued that the series might have been more effective without showing the murders in such detail. Drew Toal of Time Out awarded the series three out of five stars. Although he criticized the acting, stock characters and horror-film camera techniques, he found its cartoonish violence, gruesome deaths and deliberately corny dialogue "actually kind of fun".

Other reviewers were more critical of the writing and characterization. Brian Lowry of Variety wrote that the series too often relied upon "slasher-movie absurdities", particularly a seemingly omnipresent murderer and a shortage of meaningful clues. Brian Holcomb of Slant Magazine welcomed the promise of a conclusive ending, which he considered unusual among contemporary serialized dramas, but believed the pilot failed to exploit its central gimmick effectively. He also criticized its broadly drawn characters and insufficiently compelling mystery. Daniel Carlson of The Hollywood Reporter argued that the premise might have succeeded as a self-aware parody but found that its earnest treatment instead emphasized its weaknesses.

Reviewing the series during its British broadcast, Phelim O'Neill of The Guardian praised its deliberate embrace of familiar slasher conventions, writing, "It's like every horror film ever made—and it really doesn't skimp on the gore. O'Neill also thought the opening episodes worked best when watched together rather than at weekly intervals.

Reviewing the finale, Michael Slezak of Entertainment Weekly found the series entertaining but disappointing. Although he praised its premise and cast, he wrote that its creators had "dozens, perhaps even hundreds, of opportunities to elevate the series from entertaining trash into something truly memorable".

=== Retrospective reviews ===
Later reviews were generally more appreciative of the series, particularly when assessing it as a complete work rather than from its opening episodes. In 2015, Trace Thurman of Bloody Disgusting called the series "far better than it was given credit for". He acknowledged that the pilot introduced too many characters, the first half resembled a soap opera with horror elements and the finale lost some momentum, but praised the increased emphasis on characterization as the ensemble became smaller. Thurman also considered the series more effective when watched over a small number of sittings. In a 2016 retrospective for Decider, Joe Reid presented the series as an example of entertaining, deliberately undemanding summer television, describing it as both "perfect" and "terrible".

Marking the series' tenth anniversary in 2019, Emma Fraser of Syfy Wire argued that its planned seasonal-anthology format would be more commercially viable in the later television landscape. She also believed its interactive online material anticipated the social-media engagement that subsequently accompanied series such as Pretty Little Liars and Scandal. Fraser nevertheless criticized the 13-episode length, midseason pacing and repetitive twists, concluding that the series was better suited to an "ideal weekend-long binge".

In 2022, Valerie Ettenhofer of /Film described Harper's Island as "gory, silly, propulsive, and ultimately awesome" and a cult touchstone in horror television. She praised the series' progression from a sprawling ensemble mystery into a more focused thriller, arguing that its extended format allowed the characters to develop beyond common slasher-film archetypes. Ettenhofer also described the program as ahead of its time, while acknowledging that its dedicated audience remained relatively small.

Paul Lê of Bloody Disgusting praised the series in 2025 for combining a Christie-style whodunit with slasher horror, arguing that it was "really the first television show to lean into the concept". Although he found the opening episodes as "a bit soapy when first getting to know the ensemble cast", he praised the characters and level of violence achieved on network television, describing the intended seasonal-anthology structure as a prototype that was "well ahead of its time".

== Harper's Globe ==
Harper's Globe is a social web series, designed to complement Harper's Island. The series is created by EQAL (creators of lonelygirl15, KateModern, LG15: The Resistance) and CBS Interactive. The show premiered its weekly episodes on March 18, 2009, and ran for a total of sixteen weeks. It stars Melanie Merkosky, who played the character Jennie in lonelygirl15.

Creator Miles Beckett says of the series, "The story of Harper's Globe is about a girl named Robin, with a very mysterious past, who's gone to Harper's Island to work for the newspaper, Harper's Globe, and to digitize articles from the newspaper and to create a community online for the Harper's Globe newspaper and the citizens of Harper's Island. And then she gets pulled into the story as it begins to unfold on the island."

The character Ben, who was the first character to die in Harper's Island, was first seen in a Harper's Globe episode. The series also features appearances by Harper's Island characters Sheriff Mills, Nikki Bolton, Maggie Krell and John Wakefield.

== Home media ==
On September 8, 2009, CBS Home Entertainment (distributed by Paramount) released Harper's Island: The DVD Edition, a complete series box set on DVD in Region 1 for the very first time. Special features included audio commentaries on four episodes, deleted scenes, behind-the-scenes featurettes, CBS on-air promos, and the complete Harper's Globe webisodes. The DVD set was released on February 8, 2010, for Region 2, and released on March 4, 2010, for Region 4. The series received its first Blu-Ray release on April 16, 2025, in Australia from Via Vision Entertainment.

== Streaming ==
The entire series was available on Netflix between summer 2014 and July 1, 2015, when it was removed from the service after the Netflix license had expired. The show became available on Amazon Video, free for Amazon Prime members, otherwise available for purchase. The series is also available on Pluto TV and on The CW's free streaming platform, CW Seed. It is also available on BBC iPlayer in the UK.
