= Destructoid =

Video game news website

- Logo featuring the website's mascot, Mr. Destructoid
- Website type: Video game-focused blog
- Owner: Gamurs Group
- Website: destructoid.com
- Registration: Optional (free)
- Launched: March 16, 2006; 20 years ago
- Current status: Active

Destructoid is a website that was founded as a video game-focused blog in March 2006 by Yanier Gonzalez, a Cuban-American cartoonist and author. Enthusiast Gaming acquired the website in 2017 and sold it to Gamurs Group in 2022.

== History ==
Destructoid was created by Yanier "Niero" Gonzalez so that he could attend the Electronic Entertainment Expo (E3) in 2006. After being rejected, Gonzalez began writing original editorials and drawing cartoons which were picked up by established gaming blogs like Joystiq and Kotaku. In 2007, the site relaunched with user blogs, forums, and a team of contributors. Yanier's blog was moved off the home page in favor of a staff-edited, multi-author format. Similar to IGN, Destructoid offers free registration and readers can submit off-homepage blogs.

After E3, Gonzalez appeared at the press conference dressed as Mr. Destructoid (Destructoid's robot mascot, shown on logos and promotional material) to hand out promotional flyers. Its original editorial work gained mainstream syndication including the web show Hey Ash, Whatcha Playin'?. The Mr. Destructoid costume was redesigned in 2012 by Volpin Props, featuring animated LED circuitry, and is still active as their mascot at press events.

In 2017 the site was acquired by Enthusiast Gaming, a company based in Toronto. Enthusiast sold the website to Gamurs Group in September 2022.

== Features ==
Destructoid is split into six main sections: the Homepage where editors post daily news and reviews, the Community Blogs, the Videos section which consist of original skits and trailers, the Chat Forums, the Buy/Sell area where community members trade games, and the Fight area where members can play games against each other.

From 2010 to 2013, Destructoid produced the twice-weekly, in-studio video game news show, the Destructoid Show on Revision 3, daily live video streams like Kingdom of Foom and MASH TacticS on Twitch, and semi-regular video skits like Hey Ash Whatcha Playin, The Jimquisition, Storm's Adventures, and others on YouTube.

Destructoid reviews editor James Stephanie Sterling ran a weekly podcast with associate editor Jonathan Holmes and Conrad Zimmerman. When Sterling left Destructoid, the podcast was taken over by a new host with much less frequent updates.

== Charitable work ==
In 2008, James Stephanie Sterling, a Destructoid editor, took part in a sponsored gaming marathon raising money for young cancer patients. Raising $3,000 for the charity, Sterling and friend John Kershaw played a selection of games from the SingStar franchise, effectively singing almost non-stop for twelve hours. The event was broadcast live online for the duration of the event.

In 2009, Niero, and other Destructoid editors continued the gaming marathon tradition on October 17–18 for cancer awareness raising $4,835.60 for Extra Life children's hospital in Texas.

In 2010, the Destructoid office hosted a 24-hour gaming marathon for the charity Extra Life. Community members raised over $6,000 for Children's Miracle hospitals in Texas. Destructoid has also partnered with Revision 3 to build a clean water well in Africa through the Charity Water organization.

In 2011, Destructoid hosted another marathon for Extra Life, raising $6909.16 for Children's Miracle Hospitals. He also made a Mario Kart 7 community called "Destructoid". This community has a Bob-omb icon displayed on it. The slogan of this community is "Dtoid FNF yo".

In 2012, Destructoid hosted a 56-hour livestream on its Dtoid.tv channel, which raised over $7,000 for Habitat for Humanity. The Gonzalez flew to Costa Rica and assisted the build of a 32-house government project for families living in extreme poverty in Liberia.

== Awards ==
Destructoid has been nominated for several awards in video game coverage. The site was nominated for the inaugural Games Media Awards in 2007 under the "Non-Commercial Website or Blog" category. Destructoid was also selected as an Official Webby Honoree in the Games-Related category of the 11th Annual Webby Awards in 2007. They were nominated by the International Academy of Digital Arts and Sciences in 2009 in the same category.

== Presence in video games ==
The site's mascot, Mr. Destructoid, has appeared in various console, mobile, and PC video games, and as an emote on Twitch.

In 2007, it was announced that Hudson Entertainment, the American branch of Hudson Soft had teamed up with Destructoid to develop and introduce a playable character based on Mr. Destructoid, into its Xbox Live Arcade game Bomberman Live. Mr. Destructoid later appeared in Bomberman Ultra, the PlayStation 3 port of Bomberman Live. Mr. Destructoid's head is available as an unlockable helmet in PixelJAM's game Dino Run, by entering the password "totinos" in the cheats menu. This was included as an in-joke, because that particular brand of pizza was a favorite of one of the editors, and he in turn was a friend of the game's developers. The code was revealed in one chapter of the Podtoid podcast.

In 2008, Destructoid's mascot was also included in the platform game Eternity's Child, but was later removed after a scathing review of the game on the web site. Mr. Destructoid also appeared in Agent MOO: Maximum Overdeath on Xbox Live Indie Games along with Ron Workman, Destructoid's former community manager.

In 2010, it was announced that Mr. Destructoid would be appearing in the upcoming XBLA release of Raskulls. Later that year it was discovered that Chapter 2–18 in Super Meat Boy is called "Destructoid". The game was acclaimed by many of the editors, taking Destructoid's Game Of The Show at the Penny Arcade Expo earlier in July. Mr. Destructoid also appears in the flash game Ninjas vs Mafia, by Bardo Entertainment.

In 2011, Mr. Destructoid appeared as a non-playable character in BiteJacker, a game created by the Bytejacker show on the iPhone as a VIP Character. Your score increases the longer that he remains on screen. In July Destructoid's reviews editor, James Stephanie Sterling, became a playable character in The Blocks Cometh. Later that month Mr. Destructoid appeared in Twisted Pixel's Ms. Splosion Man as a destroyable villain during challenge mode, and again as a ball-swallowing fixture in Zen Studio's Pinball FX as part of the Ms. Splosion Man pinball table. On August 1 Mr. Destructoid became a playable character in Arcade Jumper on iOS. The remake of the classic arcade game Burgertime also features Mr. Destructoid as a playable character.

In 2012, Mr. Destructoid was revealed as a playable character in Spicy Horse's Big Head Bash, where his rooster gun shoots similar but smaller "cocks". He is also a non-playable monster enemy in MonsterMind (Facebook Game) and a machinegun accessory in PerfectWorld's Blacklight Retribution. In the game Retro City Rampage, several of Destructoid's staff appeared in the game as unlockable player skins that are available by going to MJ's Face-R-Us and entering the coupon code DTOID.

In 2014, Microsoft added an official Mr. Destructoid outfit to the Xbox Live Avatar Marketplace.

In 2016, a Mr. Destructoid flag was added as a cosmetic item in Rocket League.
