= Yousef Abu-Taleb =

American actor and producer

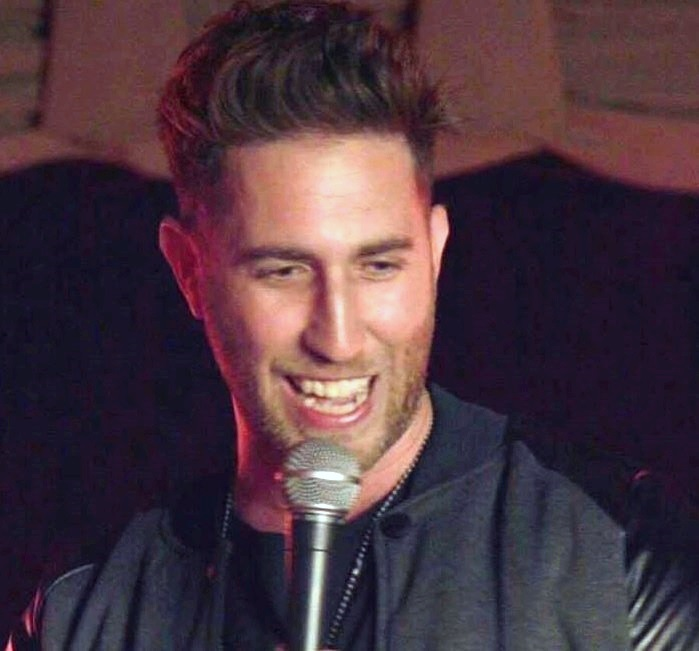
- Yousef Abu-Taleb in 2017
- Born: Arlington County, Virginia, U.S.
- Occupations: Actor; producer; comedian
- Years active: 2006–present

Yousef Abu-Taleb is an American actor. He was born in Arlington and raised in Virginia before moving to Los Angeles, California.

He is known for co-starring in the role of Daniel (Danielbeast), the longest-running character in the lonelygirl15 web drama, alongside Jessica Lee Rose. Since the show's finale, he has ventured into writing, producing, and stand-up comedy.

== Early career ==
Of Arab, English and American descent, Abu-Taleb was taking classes at the Blue Ridge Community College in Virginia in early 2005, when he decided to head to Los Angeles with $2,500 in his pocket to pursue his dream of becoming a movie star, despite the fact that he had no formal acting training at the time.

Abu-Taleb became a member of the Screen Actors Guild in 2006 and later landed roles on Lionsgate's "Bite Me" and Showtime's "Ray Donovan."

== Lonelygirl15 fame ==
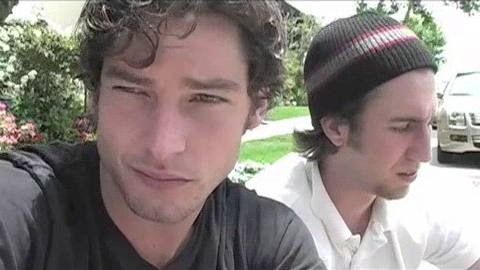
A screen capture from an episode of lonelygirl15 showing Jackson Davis as Jonas (left) and Yousef Abu-Taleb as Daniel

While looking for acting jobs in 2006, Abu-Taleb found a Craigslist posting for an independent film codenamed Children of Anchor Cove, which later turned out to be the lonelygirl15 project. Although he was older than the character of Daniel, who was written to be 15–16, he won the role and the character was rewritten to be 18.

During filming, before his identity was revealed, Yousef kept a low profile, keeping to his house and wearing sunglasses when he went out. After the creators and crew came forward, he was openly interviewed by MTV and CNN. He also appeared with Jessica Lee Rose on Tom Green Live.

lonelygirl15 won in the "biggest download" category at the VH1 Big in '06 Awards. He also did some work alongside Carmen Electra in-character as Daniel for the promotional videos of Epic Movie, a film that parodies a number of other epic films such as The Da Vinci Code, The Chronicles of Narnia: The Lion, the Witch and the Wardrobe, and Snakes on a Plane.

As of the lonelygirl15 finale in August 2008, Yousef appeared in over 300 episodes, making him the longest-running character on the show. Yousef also collaborated with lonelygirl15 writer-director Glenn Rubenstein to co-write the episode "Miss Me?" and creator Miles Beckett to film the episode "Following The Helper". He also made a surprise appearance in the final episode of the lonelygirl15 sequel series, LG15: The Resistance, "12 Videos 12 Hours."

== Post-YouTube career ==
Since leaving the show, Abu-Taleb has ventured into writing and producing. His most recent film, West of Hell, was slated for release in 2018 and his first one-hour comedy special "Washed Up Youtube Star" was set for release in 2019 and depicts his life during and after his YouTube fame. He is currently working on the upcoming Neil LaBute film Out of the Blue.
