= Weeping Willow (Law & Order: Criminal Intent) =

- Law & Order: Criminal Intent episode
- Episode no.: Season 6 Episode 10
- Directed by: Tom DiCillo
- Story by: Warren Leight; Stephanie Sengupta
- Teleplay by: Stephanie Sengupta
- Production code: 05015
- Original air date: November 28, 2006

Guest appearances
- Michelle Trachtenberg as Lisa Willow Tyler; Michael Goduti as D. Holden Foster; Pedro Pascal as Reggie Luckman; Gary Patent as Ira Whipple; Neal Jones as Chief of Detectives Bradshaw; Julie McNiven as Suzie Waller; Wallace Shawn as Film Professor; Larry King as himself

Episode chronology
← Previous "Blasters"	Next → "World's Fair"

"Weeping Willow" is the tenth episode of the sixth season of Law & Order: Criminal Intent, and the 121st episode overall. It originally aired on NBC in the United States on November 28, 2006. In the episode, a teenage blogger nicknamed WeepingWillow17, played by guest star Michelle Trachtenberg, is apparently kidnapped during the filming of one of her Internet videos. Detectives Mike Logan and Megan Wheeler investigate the so-called "cyber-kidnapping", which they and the public speculate may be an elaborate Internet hoax.

The episode and character was written by Stephanie Sengupta and Warren Leight, and directed by Tom DiCillo. The story and the WeepingWillow17 character were inspired by the lonelygirl15 video blogs on YouTube, which were originally believed the works of a real-life 15-year-old blogger, but were eventually discovered to be a professionally filmed hoax. The episode received generally positive reviews and, according to Nielsen ratings, was seen by 9.8 million households the week it aired, the most viewership for a Law & Order: Criminal Intent episode in six weeks.

== Plot summary ==
In what appears to be an Internet vlog, a teenage girl nicknamed "WeepingWillow17" (Michelle Trachtenberg) and her boyfriend Holden (Michael Goduti) are interrupted when two men in masks storm into the room and apparently kidnap them on-camera. Detectives Logan and Wheeler begin investigating the so-called "cyber-kidnapping", which they and the public suspect could be an Internet hoax. Eventually, the supposed kidnappers release an online video with Willow and Holden tied up, claiming they will kill them both if 100,000 people do not purchase their online videos for $1.99 each within 48 hours. The news media covers the story, and speculates on the possibility that it is a hoax. Eventually, a video is released in which Willow provides her real name, Lisa Willow Tyler, as proof that she is real. Logan and Wheeler visit her parents, who are elderly farmers that believe Willow is doing charity work in Africa; the police learn Willow has lied to her family and tried to achieve Internet fame to escape her dull life.

Wheeler suggests responding to the kidnappers "on their own turf" via a video blog. In response to Wheeler's video, the kidnappers make another vlog and cut off Holden's ear on-camera to prove they are serious. Although the ear is mailed to forensics and proven to be real, police quickly discover that Willow and Holden placed an online advertisement seeking actors to play kidnapper roles; they soon identify actor Reggie Luckman (Pedro Pascal) as one of the kidnappers in the WeepingWillow17 videos. Yet another vlog is released, this time with Holden escaping his bonds and shooting one of the kidnappers, before being shot himself by Reggie. Police come to the scene and find Holden alive, along with the dead body of one of the supposed kidnappers named Todd (Trevor Oswalt). Holden insisted the on-camera shooting was fake, and that Reggie shot Todd over a dispute over money after the video was filmed. Holden says the kidnapping videos started as a hoax, but that Reggie has now actually kidnapped Willow.

Additional live WeepingWillow17 videos are shown online, which police trace to a van in Union Square, where they find Willow and arrest Reggie. During interrogation, Reggie says he did not know Todd was really dead; he insists he fired a prop gun with blanks to scare Holden into splitting the money from the videos with them. Police soon learn the wadding from a blank was accidentally fired into Todd, and a horrified Reggie faces manslaughter charges. Willow, claiming to have simply been seeking fame as an actress, is released without criminal charges. The episode ends with Logan and Wheeler watching a video of Larry King interviewing Willow on a giant screen in Times Square.

== Production ==
Michelle Trachtenberg (right) plays Willow, an Internet vlogger inspired by the Internet celebrity lonelygirl15, played by actress Jessica Lee Rose (left).

"Weeping Willow" was written by René Balcer, Stephanie Sengupta and Warren Leight, who served as the show's executive producer and head writer. The episode was directed by Tom DiCillo, marking his first time as director with the series; he would go on to direct the episodes Players, Offense and Last Rites. The story and the character WeepingWillow17 are modeled after Bree, the protagonist from the lonelygirl15 video blogs on YouTube. Originally believed to be a real-life 15-year-old blogger, Bree was eventually discovered to be a hoax. She was in fact a fictional character played by actress Jessica Lee Rose and created by filmmakers Mesh Flinders and Miles Beckett.

"Weeping Willow" analyzes the concept of 15 minutes of fame during the Information Age from the perspective of the Internet celebrity, one who gains fame through the creation of or participation in a popular website. Leight said of the episode, "Forget about 15 minutes of fame: there are hundreds of people who get their 15 inches of bandwidth, people making names for themselves on YouTube and others. ... This blogging phenomenon has created a certain kind of 'cyberfame,' people who don't have to do anything more than put themselves on the Web and catch a cyberwave. We now have a spate of very strange celebrities." Leight said the episode also focuses on the extent to which one will go to achieve such fame. While the Law & Order shows routinely draw on inspiration from real-life events in an approach the creators call "ripped from the headlines", Criminal Intent producers referred to this episode as "'pre-ripping' from the headlines", because the script usually took a real-life event (as the lonelygirl15 phenomenon) and added to it a fictional dramatic conflict (the kidnapping).

The so-called "cyber-kidnapping" portrayed in "Weeping Willow" is believed to be the first such crime ever portrayed on television. While the writers and producers prepared the episode, several district attorneys they consulted said the law was dangerously vague regarding what charges could be filed in the event of such a real-life cyber-kidnapping; Wright said, "They told me that this is a real problem, that there's a lag between what's on the books now and what's happening out there." The script also includes a difficulty on the part of the detectives in coping and dealing this new form of cyber-crime and differentiating the truth from the hoax; Leight said, "Their biggest frustration is trying to understand what's real and what isn't. Does this woman, Willow, really exist, and has something happened to her? Is she playing a character and a game that's gotten out of hand? And how do you locate someone in cyberspace?"

Julianne Nicholson, who plays Det. Megan Wheeler, said "Weeping Willow" was her favorite Law & Order: Criminal Intent episode. She described it as "really different from a lot of the ones we've done before and very exciting and current." Nicholson also said she enjoyed working with Michelle Trachtenberg and the other supporting actors, as well as director DiCillo, who also directed Living in Oblivion, one of Nicholson's favorite movies.

During one of the kidnappers' videos featured in the episode, a banner is visible advertising the website FreeWillow17.com. The producers of the show set up a real-life website with that domain, containing eight video blogs starring Trachtenberg and the other cast members. The videos were created from video content filmed for the "Weeping Willow" episode, most of which was ultimately not used in the episode. The producers originally also established a mirror site, WeepingWillow17.com, but it is no longer active.

== Cultural references ==
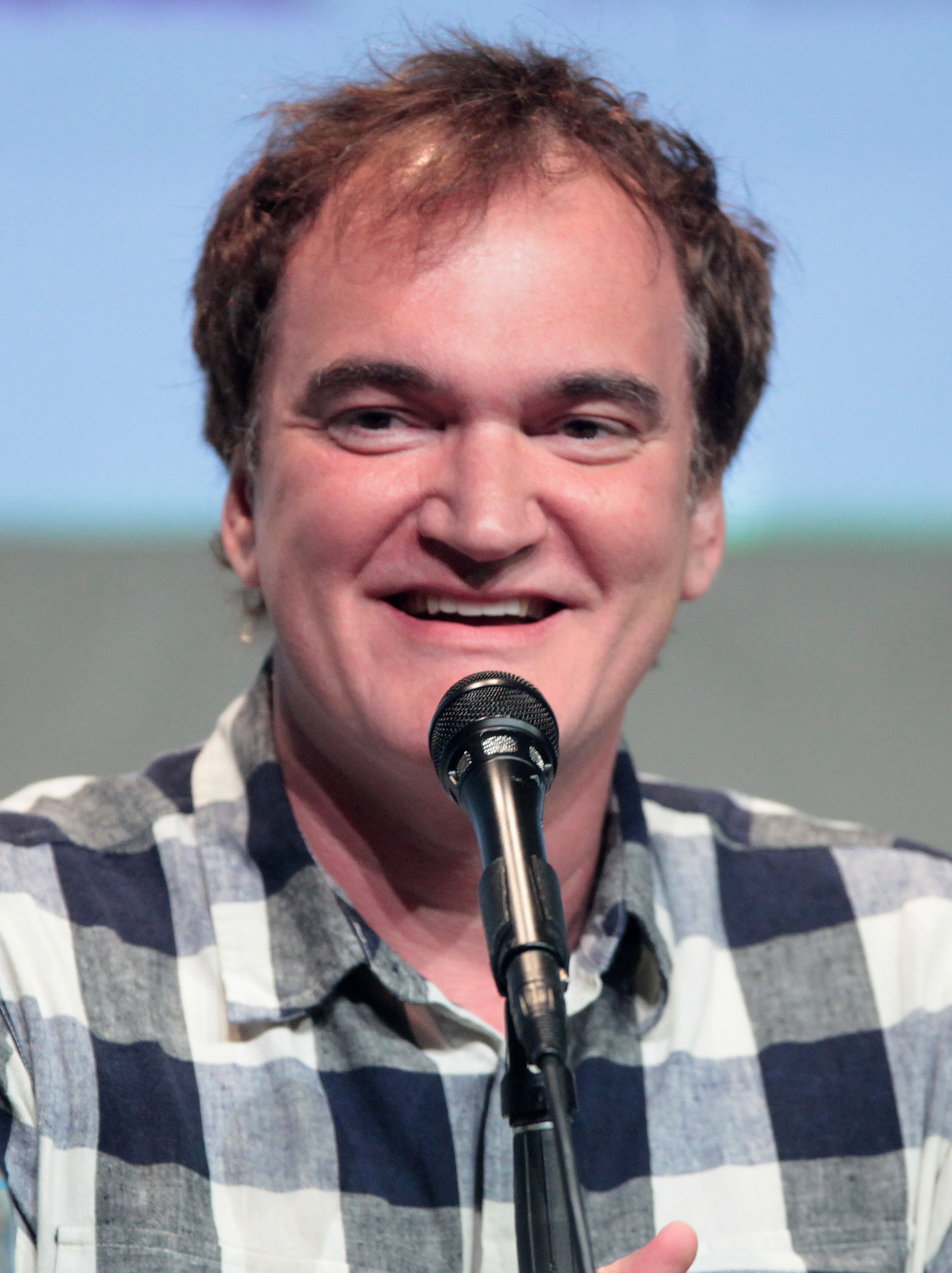
The vlog in which Holden's ear is cut off is described by one character as a rip-off of director Quentin Tarantino.

The WeepingWillow17 videos in the episode are featured on a website called "YouLenz", a reference to the popular video sharing website YouTube, where the original lonelygirl15 videos were posted. YouLenz also stands in for YouTube in the pilot episode of Smash. Willow's friend tells police she found her apartment on Craigslist, a popular online classified advertising website. During the first WeepingWillow17 video shown in the episode's first scene, the song "Fearless" by The Bravery is played.

Ira Whipple (Gary Patent) says, "In cyberspace, everyone hears you scream", a reference to the tagline of the 1979 film Alien: "In space, no one can hear you scream." A New York Film Academy professor refers to Holden as a "James Cameron-wannabe", referring to the American director of such films as The Terminator and Aliens. The vlog in which Holden's ear is cut off is described by one characters as a rip-off of director Quentin Tarantino, a reference to his 1992 feature film debut, Reservoir Dogs. During an interrogation, Mike Logan sarcastically refers to Reggie as James Dean, the famous actor and American cultural icon. Captain Danny Ross refers to the episode's shooting as "cyber-Rashomon. Reggie says Holden shot Todd, Holden says Reggie did it and Willow doesn't even believe anyone's dead." This references the 1950 Japanese film Rashomon, in which multiple characters describe vastly different interpretations of the same murder. A poster for Grand Illusion, the 1932 Jean Renoir war film, hangs in Holden's apartment. In the episode's final scene, Willow is interviewed by CNN journalist Larry King, host of Larry King Live, which is shown on a giant screen in Times Square.

== Reception ==
In its original American broadcast, "Weeping Willow" received a Nielsen rating of 3.1 and an 8 share in adults aged 18–49, translating to 9.8 million households overall. The rating was the highest overall viewership for a Law & Order: Criminal Intent episode since "Bedfellows" aired on October 17, 2006.

The episode received generally positive reviews. Farah Farouque of The Age said although she feels Law & Order: Criminal Intent had largely dropped in overall quality, she described "Weeping Willow" as "very postmodern and very watchable". Likewise, Todd Thatcher of TV Guide said although the sixth season of Criminal Intent had several episodes he deemed failures, he called "Weeping Willow" one of the "true gems". Canada's National Post said "Weeping Willow" had an interesting plot and listed it as a "must see". David Bianculli, of the New York Daily News, wrote, "The twist is easy to see coming, but Trachtenberg is easy to watch, regardless."
