= Jackson Davis (actor) =

American actor

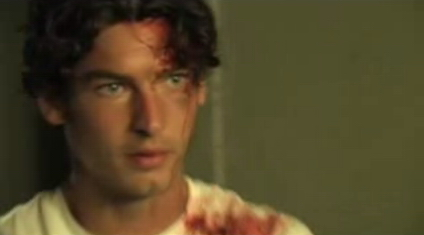
- Davis as Jonas in lonelygirl15
- Born: March 19, 1979 (age 47); Gloversville, New York, U.S.
- Occupation: Actor
- Years active: 2005–present

Jackson Davis (born March 19, 1979) is an American actor. He is best known for portraying the character "Jonas" from the lonelygirl15 videos series, its spinoff KateModern, and its sequel series, LG15: The Resistance. He was born in Gloversville, New York, but was raised in Lancaster, Pennsylvania, where he attended Ephrata High School. He starred in the 2009 film You, Only Better..., a movie about life coaches.

After graduation from high school, Davis worked a series of odd jobs before enlisting in the United States Navy. Davis was unhappy in the Navy, and afterwards he moved to Los Angeles to pursue a career in acting.

Davis was cast as the third major actor on lonelygirl15 in November 2006. His character Jonas was described as the rich alpha-dog contrast to the penniless beta-dog Daniel, played by Yousef Abu-Taleb. In addition to his work on lonelygirl15, Davis, a member of Playhouse West, has appeared in an episode of CSI: NY, and played a prominent role as a drug dealer in an episode of CSI that originally aired on April 1, 2010. He has appeared in numerous independent features including his starring role in Strange Angel, and over 15 independent shorts, including Latter Day Fake.

Davis appeared in a Raul Midon music video, "Pick Somebody Up," in 2007. In September 2008, he spent a week hosting at the ACME Comedy Theatre. The following summer, he appeared in a series of web videos parodying celebrity Proposition 8 videos.

Davis has also played the role of Donovan in the 2016 film The Wrong Car.

Davis also appeared in a Bud Light television advertisement.

In 2016, Davis starred in the feature film Deserted opposite Mischa Barton, as her brother Robin. The film is a psychological thriller about a group of friends on a road trip to a music festival in "Death Valley - which results in getting them hopelessly lost in the most stunning, but unforgiving topographical terrain on the planet". Davis teamed up with Barton again for the upcoming horror film, The Basement.

In the summer of 2020, Davis starred in Before the Fire, a pandemic thriller that garnered wide attention due to its similarity to the ongoing COVID-19 health crisis.
