= Jessica Lee Rose =

American actress and internet celebrity (born 1987)

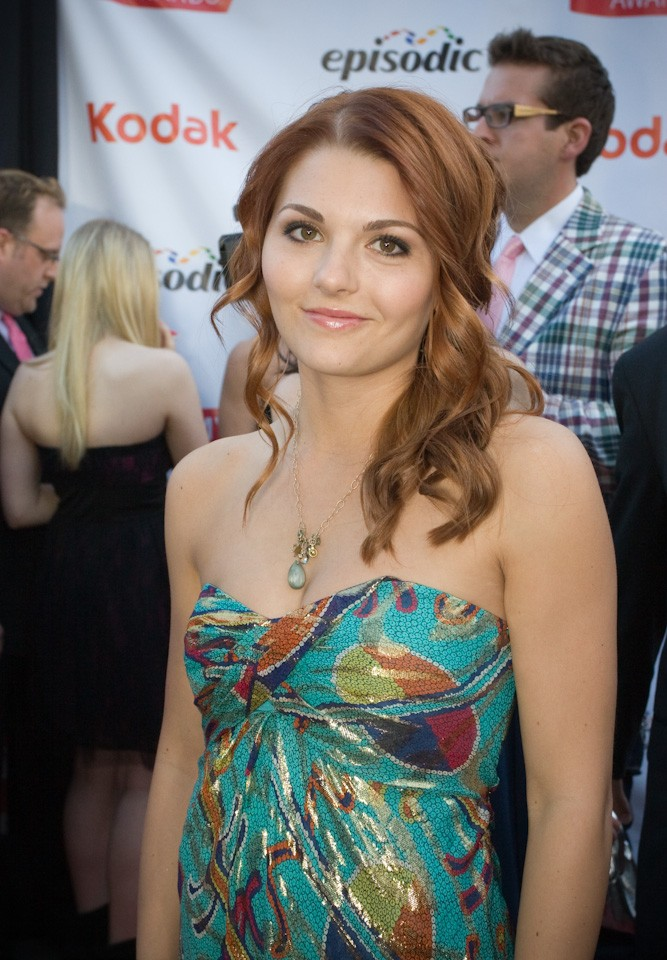
- Rose at the 1st Streamy Awards in March 2009
- Born: April 26, 1987 (age 39); Salisbury, Maryland, U.S.
- Occupations: Actress; YouTuber
- Years active: 2006–present
- Spouse: Tim Phillipps (m. 2017)
- Children: 1

Jessica Lee Rose (born April 26, 1987) is an American actress and former influencer who first gained popularity after playing the role of lonelygirl15, a fictional teenage homeschooled character named Bree who appeared in YouTube video blogs, beginning in June 2006. In September 2006, the Los Angeles Times outed the character, destroying any mystery surrounding the possible fictionality of lonelygirl15, which thrust Rose into the mainstream spotlight while also increasing the viewership of the series. In 2007, Rose won a Webby for this role.

After leaving lonelygirl15 in August 2007, Rose played "Jen K." on ABC Family's Greek. She went on to appear in various movies, such as Perfect Sport and SyFy's Ghost Town, and other web series, such as Hooking Up and Sorority Forever. She signed on to do the independent movie Look at Me with her Lonelygirl15 co-star Yousef Abu Taleb in March 2010.

== Early life ==
Rose was born in Salisbury, Maryland, and moved to Mount Maunganui, Bay of Plenty, New Zealand when she was eight. She attended Mount Maunganui College in 2000–2003 for part of her secondary school education. Afterward, she attended an acting class at Studio 111 in Auckland. In January 2004, she moved to Auckland to study at the Academy of Film and Television Make Up.

During the course of her studies, Rose's film career included doing make-up and costume work on a New Zealand short film titled Us, as well as doing extras' make-up on the set of Peter Jackson's King Kong. She played a leading role in a short film titled Dearly Beloved

After Rose's parents separated, she returned to Salisbury in May 2005, right after her 18th birthday, to live with her father. She then enrolled in the New York Film Academy (NYFA) at Universal Studios in Universal City, California. In her search for acting jobs, she found a listing for an independent film project, titled The Children of Anchor Cove, on Craigslist. She auditioned for the lead part and was offered the role of Bree. Rose signed a non-disclosure agreement and was told that the project would consist of a series of videos released to the World Wide Web over the Internet. The idea concerned her at first, as she was afraid the project was pornography, but she was convinced otherwise and agreed to partake. Although initially unpaid, as lonelygirl15 grew popular, she and co-star Yousef Abu-Taleb received salaries.

== YouTube fame ==
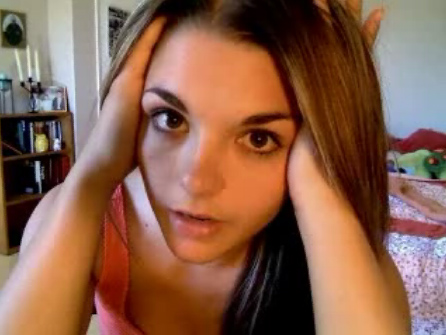
Screen capture of Rose playing Bree from lonelygirl15

The lonelygirl15 video blogs, which first appeared in mid-2006, featured Rose as a 16-year-old girl named Bree posting under the alias lonelygirl15. The videos, which seemed genuine and presented lonelygirl15 as an actual person, initially dealt with typical teenage angst issues but soon after introduced a bizarre narrative surrounding secret occult practices within her family. The series was an immediate hit and became the most subscribed channel on YouTube but suspicions arose as to whether the videos were genuine or some sort of a promotional gimmick.

An investigation by the Los Angeles Times would reveal, in September 2006, that the lonelygirl15 videos were a work of fiction. A firestorm ensued in the news media through September 2006, during which Rose and the creators of lonelygirl15 gained international attention and were interviewed by various magazines and television shows. In October 2006, the United Nations chose Rose, via her character Bree, to participate in an ad campaign to promote the UN's antipoverty cause.

In August 2007, Rose landed a role on Greek as "Jen K.", Rusty Cartwright's girlfriend. On the show, her character referenced the actress's breakout role stating "It's like I'm living with lonelygirl15!" "Weeping Willow", a November 2006 episode of Law & Order: Criminal Intent, was inspired by the lonelygirl15 videos.

On June 16, 2016, on the tenth anniversary of the series debut, lonelygirl15 reappeared. The video has Bree reassuring an unnamed 15-year-old subject about being selected, as Bree had been.

== Post-YouTube career ==
After her departure from lonelygirl15, Rose was signed by United Talent Agency, and was cast in the ABC Family series Greek in the role of "Jen K", and in the 2007 Chris Sivertson film I Know Who Killed Me, which starred Lindsay Lohan. She then played "Tina", an aspiring wrestler, in the award-winning sports drama Perfect Sport. In January 2009, Rose appeared in the music video for The White Tie Affair's song "Candle (Sick and Tired)", and that October she appeared in the Syfy television movie, Ghost Town.

On April 4, 2008, it was announced that she would star in a web television series called Blood Cell, about "a young woman [who] must race against the clock to stop a sadistic madman after receiving a disturbing late-night phone call from a friend in danger." The series was released in October 2009 through theWB.com to little media fanfare. She also starred in another web series called Sorority Forever from Big Fantastic. The series followed three incoming freshman in "the hottest sorority on campus" with some Gossip Girl and Veronica Mars elements to it. Additionally, she appeared in Hooking Up, a 10 episode web series from HBO featuring other recognized faces from the web including video bloggers sxePhil and KevJumba.

In November 2008, Rose teamed up with friend and fellow Sorority Forever star Taryn Southern to form a web production company called Webutantes, to potentially produce female-driven comedy web series. The two presented together at the 2009 Streamy Awards. In 2009, Rose appeared in the web series Poor Paul, which is produced by former lonelygirl15 co-star Yousef Abu-Taleb, and the second season of the web series The Crew.

Aside from acting, Rose is an Anaheim Ducks fan and periodically blogs for NHL.com. She reappeared as Bree on Lonelygirl15 in June 2016.

== Personal life ==
In March 2016, Rose became engaged to her partner and fellow actor Tim Phillipps. They married at the Royal Melbourne Yacht Squadron in early 2017. She gave birth to their first child, a son, in September 2019.

== Filmography ==
Film
Year	Title	Role	Notes
2007	I Know Who Killed Me	Marcia	
2008	Perfect Sport	Tina	
2009	Ghost Town	Chloe	TV film
2011	ElfQuest: A Fan Imagining	Aroree	Short film
2013	Look at Me	Elizabeth	
2013	Casting Couch	Alex	

Television
Year	Title	Role	Notes
2007–2008, 2011	Greek	Jen K.	11 episodes
2008	Casanovas	Jess	"The Strip Tease" (season 1: episode 13)
2008	Blood Cell	Julia	9 episodes
2008	Hooking Up	Meg Henley	10 episodes
2009, 2011	Poor Paul	Beatrice	8 episodes
2009	The Crew	Map	"A Pirate's Life" (season 2: episode 3) "Mis-Guided" (season 2: episode 4)
2010	BlackBoxTV	Julia Anderson	"Cats Got Your Tongue?" (season 1: episode 7)
2010–2011	The Temp Life	Tammy Roeder	"The Other Roeder" (season 5: episode 3) "The Counselor's Counselor" (season 5: episode 4) "The Hungover" (season 5: episode 5)
2012	Chronicles of a Man Child	Dana	"For the Bible Told Me So" (season 1: episode 1)

=== Web ===
Year	Title	Role	Notes
2006–2007, 2016	Lonelygirl15	Bree Avery	150 episodes
2006	Opaphid	Bree Avery (voice)	"Everyone Hates Cassie: What a Poor, Lonely Girl." (season 1: episode 8)
2008	Sorority Forever	Julie Gold	40 episodes
2010	The Webventures of Justin & Alden	Vampira	Episode: "Back to the Present"

== Awards and recognitions ==
- Streamy Awards
  - Nominated: Best Female Actor in a Dramatic Web Series (2009), Sorority Forever
- VH1
  - Won: "Big Web Hit of 2006" (December 2006)
  - Won: Fourth biggest web star in their list of "40 Biggest Internet Celebrities." (March 2007)
- Webby Awards
  - Won: Best Actress (2007), lonelygirl15
- Additional recognitions
  - Won: Forbes magazine, Number One Web Celeb (January 2007)
  - Listed: Jane Magazine, 30 Inspirational Women Under 30 (May 2007)
  - Featured: Maxim, "Today's Girl on Maxim" (March 24, 2008)
  - Listed: VideoSurf, The Five Hottest Stars of Web Series (November 20, 2009)
