= LG15: The Last =

- Also known as: The Last
- Genre: Video blog, Drama
- Created by: Samantha Carr; Emily Rose Robinson; Andrew Strouthos; Catherine Williams
- Directed by: Andrew Strouthos
- Presented by: EQAL
- Starring: Catherine Williams; Jessica Shipley; Emily Rose Robinson; Samantha Carr; Tom Mesker; James Olds; Andrew Strouthos
- Country of origin: Australia
- Original language: English
- No. of seasons: 1
- No. of episodes: 45

Production
- Executive producer: EQAL
- Producers: Samantha Carr; Emily Rose Robinson; Andrew Strouthos; Catherine Williams
- Production locations: Sydney, New South Wales
- Editor: Andrew Strouthos
- Running time: Varies from 0 to 9 minutes

Original release
- Network: LG15.com
- Release: 19 January – 28 July 2009

Related
- lonelygirl15 KateModern; LG15: The Resistance; N1ckola; LG15: Outbreak

LG15: The Last is a social show produced by Australian lonelygirl15 fans in 2009, and presented by EQAL on LG15.com. Due to the downturn in the economy, EQAL's show LG15: The Resistance was put on hiatus, and instead, the producers decided to open a contest for the fans. LG15: The Last was the result of this contest, entitled "LG15: The Show Is Yours," which allowed fans to submit pilot episodes and trailers of spin-off shows based on the Lonelygirl15 mythology, where the selected pilot would become an official LG15 Franchise show. Allowing a crowdsourced project to take over production responsibilities was seen as "unprecedented." LG15: The Last did not win the contest at first (it was runner up), but when the original winner backed out, they became the featured show.

LG15: The Last's pilot was released on 19 January 2009, with the official premiere on 9 March 2009. The show ran for ten weeks, followed by a twelve-video finale called "Quietus," which spanned one month, ending on 28 July 2009. A few days later, signs began popping up that there was, in fact, more content to come, until ultimately, it was confirmed in several chats both in- and out of character that there is one more episode to come, long enough to span at least two YouTube uploads. Due to other obligations slowing down the editing process, the airing date of this final episode is not yet known, but the story is continued on the character Twitter accounts, on the comment boards and in live chats in the meantime.

LG15: The Last was the fifth show in EQAL's popular LG15 Franchise.

== Cast of characters ==
- Catherine Williams as Chasina "Chas" Wilson, a trait positive girl who has overcome a self-destructive lifestyle and leads the fight against the Order.
- Tom Mesker as Mitchell "Mitch" Evans, Chasina's persuasive boyfriend who is willing to overlook the flaws of his friends.
- Jessica Shipley as Leigh Taylor, a youngest trait positive girl who is forced to abandon her luxurious lifestyle upon learning it is all a lie.
- Emily Rose Robinson as Jayde Cooper, the trait positive daughter of a Deacon who isn't afraid to say what she is thinking.
- Samantha Carr as Antonia "Toni" Moore, an intelligent trait positive Hymn of One member with little real world life experience.
- James Olds as Bray Johnson, a bartender whose self-righteous attitude begins to falter while fighting against the Order.
- Unknown Actress as Sibylla Weave, a mysterious entity working on the side of the Order who tears the group apart from the inside.
- Andrew Strouthos as Xavier Weave, Sibylla's twin brother who befriended Jayde and began working against the group with Sibylla.

== Synopsis ==
Set in Sydney, Australia, the series revolved around the lives of the last four trait positive girls in Australia—Chasina Wilson, Leigh Taylor, Jayde Cooper, and Antonia Moore. In the show's pilot episode, Chasina receives an email from lonelygirl15 and LG15: The Resistance's Jonas Wharton, which informs her of her trait positive status, and provides her with information about the three other girls. She must save herself and the other girls, with help from Mitch Evans and Bray Johnson, from a tech-savvy Elder, Sibylla and Xavier Weave, and a traitor living right in their own homes.
