= Charlie Buhler =

American film director (born 1987)

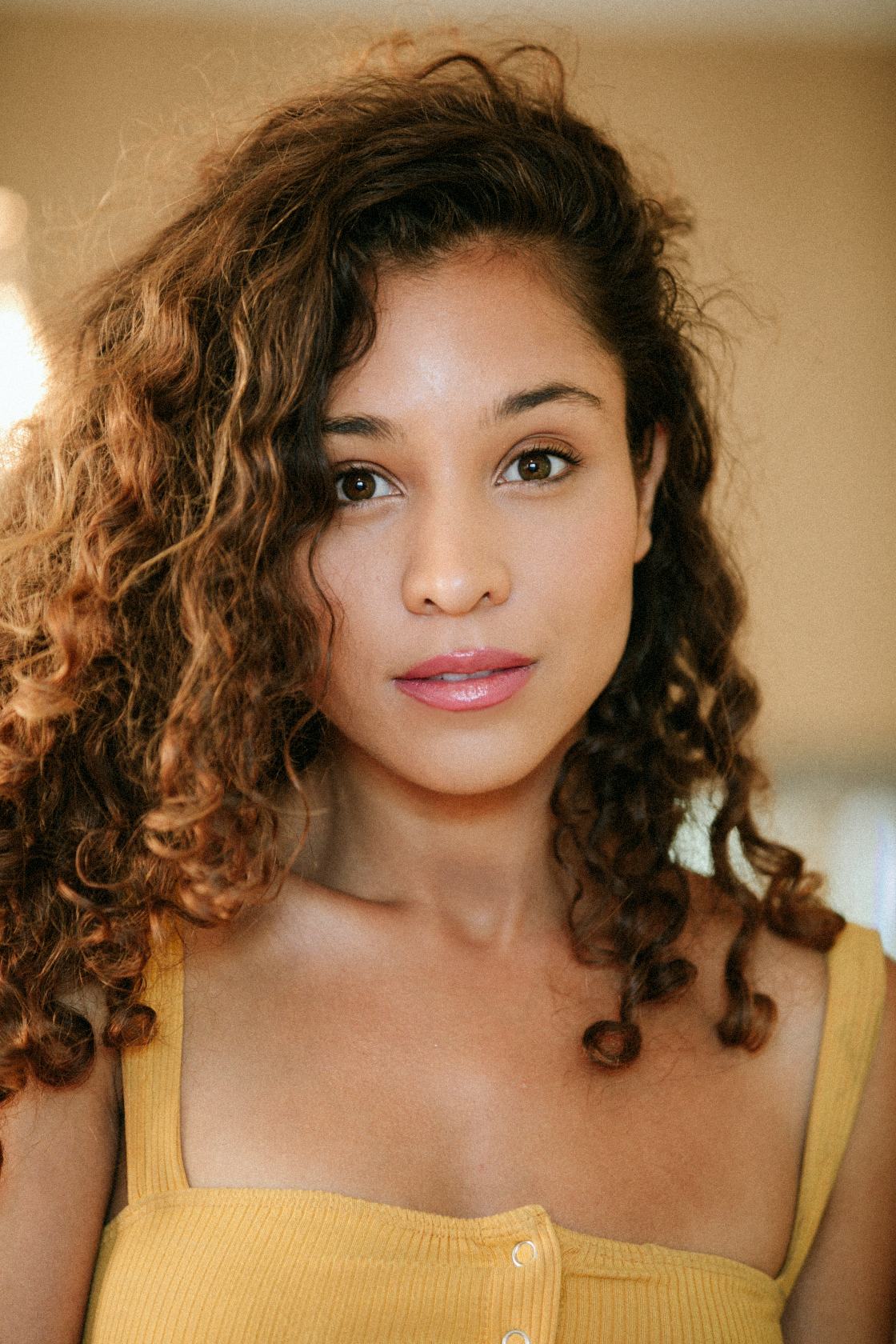
- Born: Minot Air Force Base, North Dakota, U.S.
- Education: University of Notre Dame
- Occupations: Film director, photographer, producer

Charlie Buhler (born December 25) is an American director, photographer, and producer. She is best known for her directorial debut, Before the Fire, a pandemic thriller that premiered in 2020 amid the COVID-19 crisis. Buhler's other notable work includes the documentary Rosebud and Eric Stoltz's feature film Confessions of a Teenage Jesus Jerk where she played Jasmine. In 2008, Buhler was the first African-American woman to be crowned Miss South Dakota USA. She later represented South Dakota at the Miss USA 2008 pageant.

== Life and career ==
Charlie Buhler was born on Minot Air Force Base in Minot, North Dakota, to Darlene (Tinsley) Buhler and Dr. Carey Buhler, a radiologist. She is mixed-race, and often cites her diverse background as a major source of inspiration for her work. She spent her childhood in Rapid City and Mitchell, South Dakota, and then went on to study film and American politics at the University of Notre Dame, where she was the first African-American woman to be elected class president. She graduated in 2010.

In 2016, Buhler had a role in Eric Stoltz's debut feature, Confessions of a Teenage Jesus Jerk. A coming of age dramedy about young Jehovah's Witnesses discovering sex, drugs and rock and roll in the 80's. She played Jasmine.

In 2020, she made her directorial debut with the pandemic thriller, Before the Fire, which she also produced. It starred Jenna Lyng Adams, Ryan Vigilant and Jackson Davis, and premiered in the midst of the COVID-19 pandemic. The film made its world premiere at the Cinequest Film Festival newsworthy due to its eery similarities to the ongoing crisis, and received positive reviews.

Buhler is also a documentarian and photographer. Her most notable work was the photography series, ROSEBUD which she shot over two years on the Rosebud and Pine Ridge Indian Reservations in South Dakota. It was published in the Photographic Journal in 2018.

== Awards and nominations ==
FILM
YEAR	AWARD	WORK	RESULT
2021	Cinequest: Best Feature Thriller	Before the Fire	Won
2021	Harlem Film Festival: Best Production	Before the Fire	Won

COMMERCIAL AND MUSIC VIDEO
YEAR	AWARD	WORK	RESULT
2022	CLIO Awards: Best Music Video	Black Superhero	Bronze
2022	ADC Awards: Best Music Video	Black Superhero	Silver
2022	Webby Awards: Best Branded Content	Snapchat Inclusive Camera	Nominated
2022	The One Show: Best Branded Content	Snapchat Inclusive Camera	Gold

Awards and achievements
Preceded by Suzie Heffernan	Miss South Dakota USA; 2008	Succeeded by Jessica Rowell
