= Alexandra Dreyfus =

American actress

- Born: April 7, 1986 (age 40); Los Angeles, California, U.S.
- Other names: Lexi, Lexie, Ra
- Occupations: Actress, director, writer, photographer
- Website: radreyfus.com

Alexandra Dreyfus (born April 7, 1986) is an American actress, director, and writer. She is best known for directing music videos and commercials, photographing celebrities, and portraying Sarah Genatiempo in the Internet series lonelygirl15 and its spinoff LG15: The Resistance.

== Career ==
Dreyfus was born in Los Angeles, California. As a young adult, she appeared in soap operas, commercials and on Barbie boxes, as the face of Mattel. As an adult, she moved to Germany, where she trained under a Vogue photographer.

She moved back to LA, and worked in production for Bully Pictures and Bullrun car rallies. Alexandra then went on to star in a YouTube web series, Lonelygirl15.

She moved to London to be on a show for ITV 4. While abroad, she wrote an opinion column for the British magazine Dapper. She then went on to become head-writer in Los Angeles for Digital Playground, earning a Best Picture AVN nomination for her script, Assassins.

For a time, Alexandra worked for Paris Hilton, after which she moved to New York City and developed a name for herself as a fine art photographer, Ra Dreyfus.

Alexandra is currently working on various projects, including her first animated comedy 'Jesse'.

== Filmography ==
- 2007–2008: Lonelygirl15 as Sarah Genatiempo (a.k.a. theskyisempty99 – 49 episodes)
- 2008: LG15: The Resistance as Sarah Genatiempo (2 episodes)
- 2009: Dubplate Drama as Sasha
- 2011: The World According to Paris as herself, Paris's assistant
