= N1ckola =

Polish web series

- Also known as: n1ckola, the lonelygirl15 universe
- Genre: Video blog, Drama
- Developed by: EQAL; Agora SA; A2 Multimedia
- Written by: Jakub Kossakowski; Maura Ładosz; Zdzisław Miśkiewicz; Andrzej Staszczyk
- Starring: Ania Narloch; Bartek Picher; Konrad Marszałek; Julia Trębacz; Jakub Krawczyk; Anna Kordus
- Countries of origin: Poland; United Kingdom
- Original languages: Polish; English
- No. of seasons: 1
- No. of episodes: 101

Production
- Executive producer: Marcin Męczkowski
- Producers: Miles Beckett; Greg Goodfried; Amanda Goodfried; Kamil Przłęcki; James R. Sterling
- Production locations: London, England; Wałbrzych, Poland; Wrocław, Poland
- Running time: Varies from 0 to 9 minutes

Original release
- Network: TV4
- Release: January 26 – June 30, 2009

Related
- lonelygirl15 KateModern; LG15: The Resistance; LG15: The Last; LG15: Outbreak

N1ckola is a Polish web series based on the lonelygirl15 Universe. It was produced by EQAL, Agora SA, and A2 Multimedia and began in 2009. According to Greg Goodfried and Miles Beckett of EQAL, the show "blends reality, documentary, and fiction. It was always our hope to expand the LG15 Universe into new countries through full-format licensing deals like this one with Agora. N1ckola is the perfect example of a business model we'd like to replicate in the future in even more countries."

N1ckola debuted on its own network, N1ckola.pl, on January 26, 2009, with show sponsors including Microsoft and Hasbro. Its first season lasted for one hundred videos, and ended with the video "Landsteiner" on June 30, 2009. It has been announced that a second season will take place, but it is not known when yet. Season 1 was repackaged into longer episodes and appeared on Polish television in the summer of 2009.

N1ckola was the fourth show in EQAL's popular LG15 Franchise, and also EQAL's first business venture in a language other than English.

== Cast of characters ==
- Ania Narloch as Ola Polak, a trait positive girl from Poland who moved to London to escape her over-protective parents and sheltered life. She returns to Poland on vacation and uncovers disturbing information on her family and friends.
- Bartek Picher as Bartek Sfinks, an agent of the Order who follows Ola to Wrocław and later to Wałbrzych . While his true allegiance remains unclear, he is shown actively helping Ursyn and Pyton prevent Ola from doing the Ceremony.
- Konrad Marszałek as Ursyn Wysocki, a reporter whose co-worker and friend is murdered while doing an exposé on the Hymn of One. He vows to complete his work, and becomes involved in the battle against the Order.
- Julia Trębacz as Ewa, Ursyn's assistant and love interest with a tendency to get too involved with the stories she covers. Later revealed as a member of the Hymn of One, she risks her life in order to help her friends fight the Order.
- Jakub Krawczyk as Pyton, a friend of Ursyn who works as a paparazzo. He was taking pictures for Andrzej when he was killed, leading him to join Ursyn and Ewa in their fight against the Order and even spending time with his ex.
- Anna Kordus as Karolina, Pyton's ex-girlfriend who works for a professional audio-visual company, and has developed the ability to read lips, using her talents to aid in police investigations and fighting the Order.
