= VH1 Big in '06 Awards =

2006 American entertainment awards

- Date: December 3, 2006
- Hosted by: D. L. Hughley
- Website: http://www.big.vh1.com

Television/radio coverage
- Network: VH1

VH1's Big in '06 was an award show that aired on VH1 on December 3, 2006 on VH1 in the United States. It was the annual VH1 Big Awards. The show was hosted by comedian D. L. Hughley, and featured many guests, including Paris Hilton, Hulk Hogan, Janelle Pierzina, Will Kirby, Danny Bonaduce, Justin Timberlake, Fergie, The Killers, the Fray, "Weird Al" Yankovic, Flavor Flav, Tiffany "New York" Pollard, Britney "Tiger" Morano, Abigail "Red Oyster" Kintanar, Jesselynn "Wire" Desmond, Jenna Jameson, Hayden Panettiere, Tommy Lee, Katharine McPhee, George Takei, Miley Cyrus, Masi Oka, Eva Longoria, David Hasselhoff, Mario Lopez, Joey Lawrence, will.i.am, Perez Hilton, lonelygirl15, Kiefer Sutherland, Xzibit and Dominic Monaghan, and many other celebrities associated with today's pop culture, most being reality tv stars. The show was broadcast across the United States.

== List of winners ==
- BIG Entertainer – Dane Cook
- BIG Reality Star – Janelle Pierzina
- BIG TV Star – Kiefer Sutherland
- BIG Music Artist – Justin Timberlake
- BIG Web Hit – lonelygirl15
- BIG Mama – Britney Spears
- BIG Breakthrough – Stephen Colbert
- BIG Comeback – David Hasselhoff
- BIG "IT" Girl – Katharine McPhee
- BIG Outlaw – Paris Hilton
- BIG Power Couple – Beyoncé & Jay-Z
- BIG Shocker – North Korea tests a nuke
