= Yumiko Aoyagi =

Japanese television writer

Yumiko Aoyagi (青柳 祐美子, Aoyagi Yumiko; born 1970 in Yokohama, Kanagawa) is a Japanese television writer, whose work also covers publishing and film. She worked briefly in 2007 on the United States web show lonelygirl15 as a writer, director, and producer.

== Career ==
Born in Yokohama in 1970, Aoyagi graduated from Sophia University (Jōchi Daigaku). She debuted as a screenwriter in 1995, penning the fourth episode of the Fuji TV series Seiga wa tatsu. In 1996, her two-hour telefilm, Saigo no kazoku ryokō: Family Affair for Tokyo Broadcasting System earned a special recommendation Galaxy Award. Her latest project is $5.2 million, the world's biggest Internet show, "The Scary City" that launched on September 15, 2008.

== Filmography as writer ==
- Tomoko no baai (1996)
- Hitorigurashi (1996)
- Moonlight Express (1999)
- Okuman chôja to kekkon suru hôhô (2000)
- Pretty Girls (2002)
- Kokoro (156 episodes, 2003)
- Manhattan Diaries (2007)
- Lonelygirl15 (7 episodes, 2007)
- The Scary City (20 episodes, 2007-2009)
- Untitled Takashi Miike film (TBA)
