= Melanie Merkosky =

Canadian actress (born 1980)

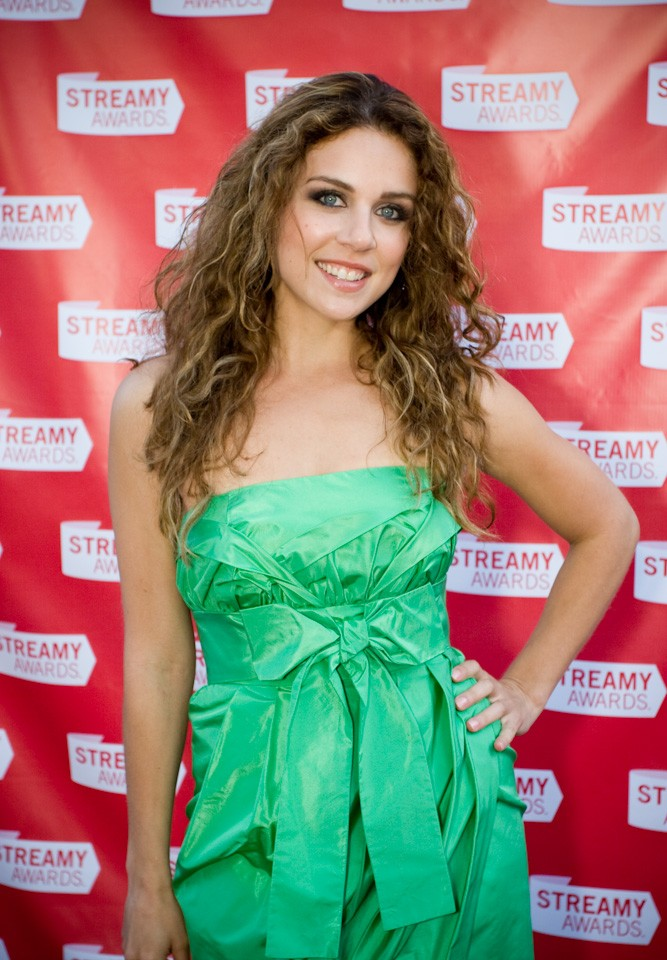
- Merkosky at the 2009 Streamy Awards
- Born: Melanie Joanna Merkosky; April 7, 1980 (age 46); Canada
- Other name: Melanie Merkovsky
- Occupations: Actress, Video Blogger
- Years active: 1998 - present

Melanie Merkosky (born April 7, 1980) is a Canadian actress. She played Jennie in the Internet series lonelygirl15.

== Career ==
Merkosky had parts on Runaway, Slings and Arrows, and American Pie Presents The Naked Mile. In 2009, she starred as Robin Matthews on the web series Harper's Globe, which was an online companion to TV series Harper's Island.

== Filmography ==
- 1998: Noah as Cheerleader #1
- 1998: Honey, I Shrunk the Kids: The TV Show as Girl (1 episode)
- 1999: The Sheldon Kennedy Story as Theresa
- 2002: Door to Door as Diner Teenage Girl (as Melanie Merkovsky)
- 2006: American Pie Presents The Naked Mile as Natalie
- 2006: Away from Her as Singing Nurse
- 2006: Slings and Arrows as Megan (5 episodes)
- 2006 - 2008: Runaway as Sam (9 episodes)
- 2007: The Poet as Olga
- 2007: Til Death Do Us Part as Tara Clark (1 episode)
- 2007 - 2008: lonelygirl15 as Jennie (34 episodes)
- 2009: Harper's Globe as Robin Matthews (16 episodes - web series)
- 2009: Harper's Island as Robin Matthews (1 episode)
- 2009: H and G as G (also writer and producer)
- 2012-2013: Continuum
- 2014: The Strain as Sylvia Kent (recurring role)
- 2014: An Eye for Beauty as Lindsay
- 2015: Saving Hope (Season 3, Episode 13)
