= Untitled Takashi Miike film =

Upcoming Takashi Miike film

- Directed by: Takashi Miike
- Written by: Ross Evans; Yumiko Aoyagi
- Produced by: Charli XCX; Yumiko Aoyagi; Misako Saka; Aidan Zamiri
- Starring: Charli XCX; Milly Alcock; Hailey Gates; Show Kasamatsu; Kiko Mizuhara; Norman Reedus
- Production companies: Good World Productions; Live Nation Entertainment; OLM; Studio365
- Countries: United States; Japan; United Kingdom
- Languages: English; Japanese

Takashi Miike is directing an upcoming slasher film from a screenplay by Ross Evans and Yumiko Aoyagi. It stars Charli XCX, Milly Alcock, Hailey Gates, Show Kasamatsu, Kiko Mizuhara, and Norman Reedus.

== Premise ==
Follows three friends who meet up in Kyoto only to see their holiday turn into a nightmare as one of them is possessed by a tortured spirit.

== Cast ==
- Charli XCX as Katie
- Milly Alcock
- Hailey Gates
- Show Kasamatsu
- Kiko Mizuhara
- Norman Reedus

== Production ==
In April 2025, it was reported that filmmaker Takashi Miike would be directing a slasher film from a screenplay by Ross Evans and Yumiko Aoyagi, with Charli XCX starring and producing. Principal photography began in Japan in February 2026, with Milly Alcock, Show Kasamatsu, Kiko Mizuhara, and Norman Reedus joining the cast. In March, Hailey Gates joined the cast.
