= Lonelygirl15 =

American science fiction thriller web series

lonelygirl15
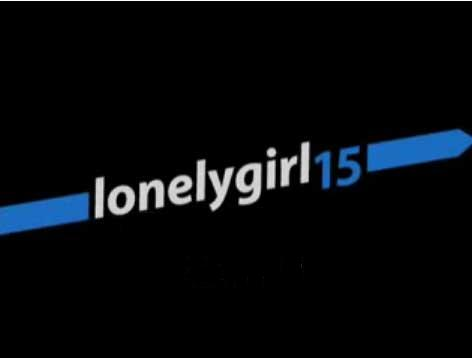
- Also known as: LG15; Lonely Girl 15
- Genre: Supernatural; Thriller; Science fiction; Drama; Soap opera
- Created by: Miles Beckett; Mesh Flinders; Greg Goodfried; Amanda Goodfried
- Directed by: Marcello Daciano; Colin Hargraves; Glenn Rubenstein; Amanda Goodfried; Jackson Davis; Kevin Schlanser; Mesh Flinders; Miles Beckett; Yumiko Aoyagi
- Starring: Jessica Lee Rose; Yousef Abu-Taleb; Jackson Davis; Becki Kregoski; Alexandra Dreyfus; Maxwell Glick; Katherine Pawlak; Bitsie Tulloch; Crystal Young; Melanie Merkosky; Raegan Payne
- Voices of: Kevin Schlanser
- Country of origin: United States
- Original language: English
- No. of seasons: 3
- No. of episodes: 547

Production
- Executive producers: Amanda Goodfried; Glenn Rubenstein; Greg Goodfried; Mesh Flinders; Miles Beckett; Yumiko Aoyagi
- Producers: Amanda Goodfried; Glenn Rubenstein; Mesh Flinders; Miles Beckett; Yumiko Aoyagi
- Production locations: Marin County, California
- Editors: Amanda Goodfried; Colin Hargraves; Glenn Rubenstein; Ian Schwartz; Kevin Schlanser; Miles Beckett
- Camera setup: Single-camera
- Running time: Varies

Original release
- Network: YouTube
- Release: June 16, 2006 – August 1, 2008

Related
- LG15: The Resistance; KateModern; N1ckola; LG15: The Last; LG15: Outbreak

lonelygirl15 is an American science fiction thriller web series created by Miles Beckett, Mesh Flinders, Greg Goodfried, and Amanda Goodfried. It was independently released on YouTube from June 16, 2006, to August 1, 2008, and was also briefly released on Revver and Myspace. The series revolves around the initially mundane life of homeschooled 16-year-old Bree Avery (Jessica Lee Rose), who uses the username Lonelygirl15 online. She goes on the run with her friend Daniel (Yousef Abu-Taleb) after her parents' mysterious religion is revealed to be The Order, a blood-harvesting operation that wants her "trait positive" blood. The series is presented through video blogs, or vlogs, originally recorded solely from Bree's bedroom.

After discovering YouTube in 2005, Beckett, then a doctor, came up with the idea for a series of staged video blogs presented as though they were real, and set out to create Lonelygirl15 with Flinders, a filmmaker. The two wrote a script and came up with the character of Bree together. Greg and Amanda Goodfried, both lawyers, were brought on to handle the business aspect of the project and to manage Bree's online affairs, respectively. Bree's first few vlogs were posted to the Lonelygirl15 YouTube channel in June 2006, and they quickly gained popularity on the website, with users believing Bree to be a real person making videos about her everyday life. Lonelygirl15 eventually became the most-subscribed YouTube channel, surpassing geriatric1927, a position it held for 226 days in late 2006 and early 2007 during which it became the first YouTube channel to reach 50,000 subscribers.

As the series gained popularity, viewers began to question its authenticity, and users of the Lonelygirl15.com forum soon found proof that it was fake after messaging Bree on Myspace and tracing her IP address to the offices of Creative Artists Agency, where Amanda Goodfried worked. A story published by the Los Angeles Times revealing this information, as well as a post on journalist Tom Foremski's blog Silicon Valley Watcher revealing Rose's identity, led to the project being outed as a hoax in September 2006. Viewership for the series continued to grow after the reveal, and it experienced its highest viewership in 2007.

Bree has frequently been called YouTube's first viral star, and Lonelygirl15 became known for calling into question the authenticity of web content and for pioneering vlogging. Over the course of its release, Lonelygirl15 won a Webby Award and a VH1 Big in '06 Award, and was nominated for a YouTube Award. EQAL, a production company founded by Beckett and Flinders, produced several spinoffs of the series, including KateModern and LG15: The Resistance.

== Plot ==
=== Season 1 ===
Bree Avery (lonelygirl15), a homeschooled 16-year-old girl, begins posting video blogs on YouTube about her mundane daily life and her interests, such as science and her purple monkey puppet, P-Monkey.

Her best friend, Daniel (Danielbeast), occasionally appears in the videos and uploads videos of his own, and a romantic connection between Daniel and Bree starts to form as tensions regarding Bree's family's strange, unnamed religion arise between Bree and Daniel, and later between Bree and her parents.

Bree is soon chosen to participate in a mysterious ceremony for her religion, which she must prepare for by dieting, taking shots, and learning Enochian. After an argument between Bree and Daniel, Daniel starts following her outside and recording her while she prepares for the ceremony with her "helper", Lucy.

Daniel discovers that Lucy has photographs of him on her computer and staged a fake ceremony with Bree to trick him while he was recording, and Bree asks her parents to tell the deacons of her religion that she no longer wants to go through with the ceremony, to which they agree.

Later, the show moved to a bizarre narrative that portrayed her dealings with secret occult practices within her family, and included the mysterious disappearance of her parents after she refused to attend a "secret" ceremony prescribed by the leaders of the family's cult.

== Cast and characters ==
- Jessica Lee Rose as Bree Avery (a.k.a. lonelygirl15), a bubbly teenage girl whose trait positive blood makes her the target of a dangerous cult called the Order. She gained a large following on YouTube due to her quirky video blogs.
- Yousef Abu-Taleb as Daniel Barlow (a.k.a. Danielbeast), Bree's best friend, who only wishes to protect her, but is often distracted by romantic engagements. He can often jump to conclusions, and battles with an alcohol addiction along with his parents.
- Jackson Davis as Jonas Wharton (a.k.a. jonastko), a boy who meets Bree online and discovers that his family has more ties to the Order than he realizes. He can be too willing to trust others, which often leads the TAAG (Teen Angst Adventure Group) into unfortunate situations.
- Alexandra Dreyfus as Sarah Genatiempo (a.k.a. theskyisempty99), a misunderstood 19-year-old who develops a crush on Daniel and travels with TAAG. While she struggles to figure out what to do with her life, she harbors a dark and dangerous secret.
- Becki Kregoski as Taylor Genatiempo (a.k.a. soccerstar4ever), Sarah's younger sister who has impressive computer hacking skills. A passionate soccer player, she has more social skills than the rest of her family and is often upset by their actions.
- Maxwell Glick as Spencer Gilman (a.k.a. LAlabrat), an employee at Neutrogena with connections to the Order's science division. Chosen as a good role model for Bree, he sets out to help engineer a Trait Negative Serum.
- Katherine Pawlak as Emma Wharton, Jonas's trait positive younger sister. She grows up significantly during her battle for her life against the Order, and goes out of her way to try to protect her friends.
- Melanie Merkosky as Jennie, a former Lullaby Project employee who becomes friends with Sarah. She begins a romantic affair with Jonas and gives the TAAG an insight on how the Order's structure works.
- Crystal Young as Gina Hart, Bree's trait positive older sister who was taken from her at birth and used as a lab rat most of her life. She is quiet and reserved, and feels more comfortable with art supplies than with other people.
- Raegan Payne as Sonja, A member of the Hymn of One who tried to recruit Bree and eventually left the Hymn after she was badly beaten. One of the last videos in the Lonelygirl15 series suggested that Sonja had returned to the Hymn of One.

== Production ==
=== Conception and casting ===
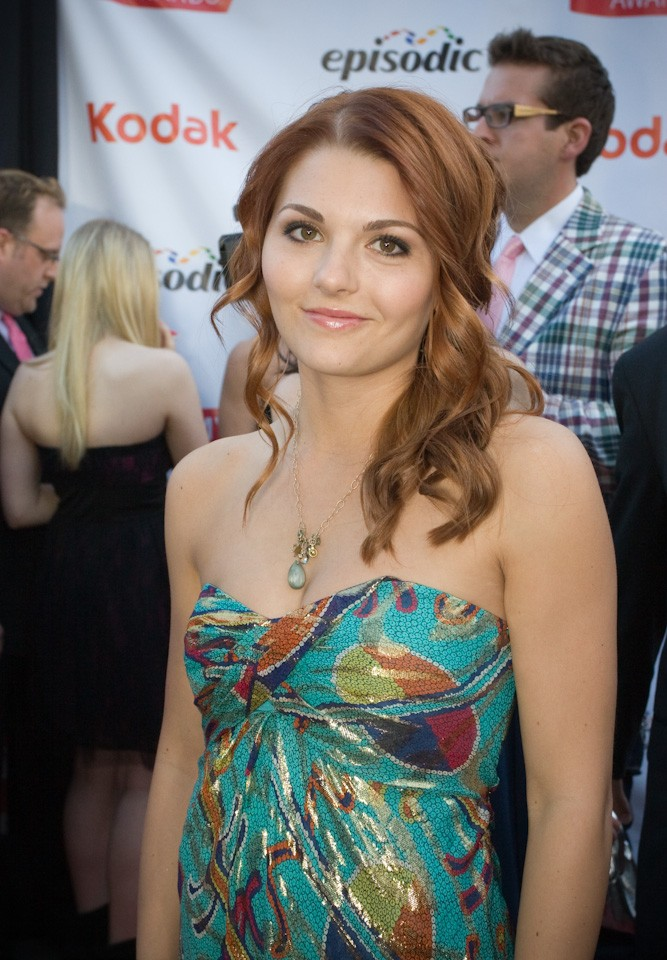
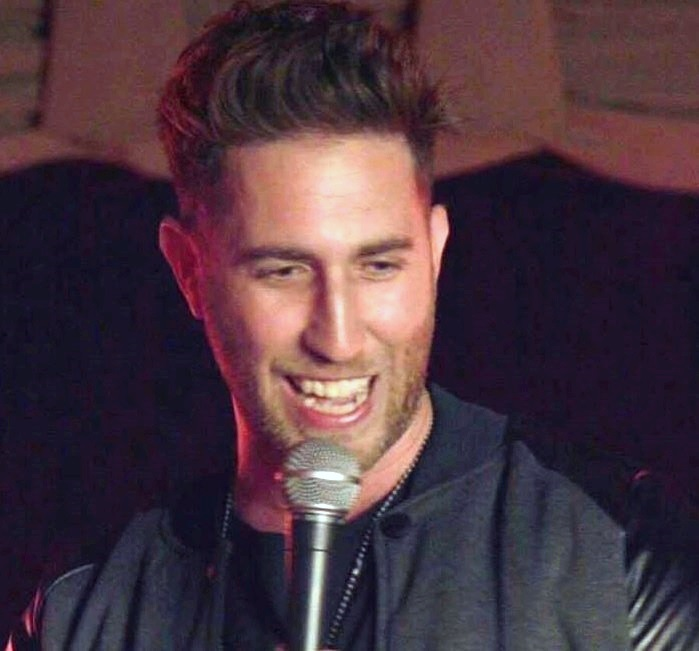
Jessica Lee Rose and Yousef Abu-Taleb were picked to play Bree Avery and Daniel, respectively.

After quitting a plastic surgery program, Miles Beckett, who was producing video podcasts in Los Angeles, discovered YouTube in 2005 after seeing The Lonely Island's video for their song "Lazy Sunday" on Myspace. At the time, YouTube was still mostly unknown. He got the idea for a fictional narrative story told through a series of ostensibly authentic video blogs, or vlogs, after watching videos of YouTube duo Smosh lip-syncing to the Pokémon theme song and realizing it was difficult to tell the difference between what was real and what was staged on the site.

Beckett met Ramesh "Mesh" Flinders, a screenwriter and filmmaker from Marin County, California, during a birthday party at The Gaslite, a karaoke bar in Santa Monica, in April 2006. The two quickly became close and wrote a script, as well as a storyline for the first three months of vlogs, in two weeks. Together, they came up with the character of Bree, a quirky, homeschooled 16-year-old "girl next door" belonging to a strange religion who would post daily vlogs, occasionally with her best friend, Daniel, until one day she disappeared. When she disappeared, the two would make an independent direct-to-video film styled after The Blair Witch Project and based on the vlogs in which Bree's fans go looking for her. The idea for the film was eventually scrapped after the series gained traction on YouTube. Bree's character was partially inspired by Flinders's own sheltered upbringing on a commune in Northern California, as well as his knowledge of the occult. Flinders would later leave the series in 2007 to work on other projects.

Greg Goodfried, a lawyer and friend of Flinders and Beckett, was brought on to manage the business aspect of the series, while Amanda Solomon, Goodfried's wife and an attorney for Creative Artists Agency, was brought on to act as Bree online, which included managing her Myspace account and replying to emails sent in by fans. Grant Steinfeld, a software engineer from San Francisco, was also brought on to help distribute the videos and create a dummy website for the series, though he soon dropped out of the project. Before they found someone to portray Bree in the videos, Beckett and Flinders posted two video replies to popular YouTubers at the time on a channel titled Lonelygirl15. Using space and resources provided by the nonprofit organization Film Independent, Flinders, Beckett, and Goodfried held a casting call in Los Angeles, which they posted on Craigslist as The Children of Anchor Cove. After graduating from the New York Film Academy, then-19-year-old actress Jessica Lee Rose moved to Los Angeles to start her acting career. After finding the Craiglist listing, she auditioned for the role in April 2006. The three cast Rose for the role due to her youthful appearance and relative anonymity at the time, as she had only been to one other audition before that. Despite some initial hesitancy after finding out it would be on the Internet, worried that it was either a scam or a pornographic film, Rose agreed to take on the role. She later said of playing Bree, "I loved that character. It's one of my favourites that I've ever gotten to play."

Yousef Abu-Taleb, who had moved from Virginia to Los Angeles the year before his audition and was working as a server at Red Lobster, was cast as Daniel because of his "dorky", "unpretentious" look. Both Rose and Abu-Taleb were asked to delete or make private all of their online accounts by the show's creators before filming began. The cast and crew of the series were all required to sign non-disclosure agreements. In order to maintain Rose and Abu-Taleb's anonymity, both were given enough money by the show's creators to avoid having to work in public, and they stayed in their houses for three months until the series was exposed as a hoax.

In early January 2007, American Idol runner-up Katharine McPhee, whose debut album was being released later that month, guest starred in an episode of the series ("Truth or Dare") after her management team reached out to the show's creators. The episode featured a song from the album.

=== Filming, writing, editing, and release ===
Rose's first vlog as Bree, "First Blog/Dorkiness Prevails", was posted to the Lonelygirl15 YouTube channel on June 16, 2006. It was one minute and 35 seconds long, unscripted, and produced with a budget of $130. The video used a broken desk lamp and natural light from a window for lighting, and was filmed using a Logitech QuickCam in Flinders's bedroom, which was decorated with furniture from thrift stores and Target, including a pink feather boa and a floral blanket, to give it the appearance of a teenage girl's bedroom. Bree was nonetheless presented to viewers as a real teenage girl vlogging her day-to-day life. Each of the channel's videos were scripted, though Rose frequently paraphrased lines or improvised around them in order to make the character seem more natural. She was instructed by the show's creators to study other vloggers of the time to build her character. According to Rose, episodes typically took about one hour to film on average. Two or three episodes would be shot per day, the day after they were written, and Beckett would edit them the day after they were filmed.

After it was revealed that the series was a hoax, the storyline went on to grow more complex and include more characters, with four to five episodes being posted to YouTube, Revver, Myspace, and the show's website per week. The series developed into an alternate reality game, with comments underneath the videos influencing plotlines in the series and getting acknowledged by characters, who would ask for viewers' help with solving puzzles. The first season of Lonelygirl15 ended in August 2007 after 260 episodes, with the season's final 12 episodes being released exclusively on MySpaceTV and Lonelygirl15.com over 12 hours. Bree's death at the end of the first season was prompted by struggles to renegotiate Rose's contract as well as requests from Rose herself to have the character die. The series continued until August 1, 2008, when the channel's last video was posted.

=== Funding and sponsorships ===
According to Flinders, Lonelygirl15 was largely self-funded in the beginning, and he and Goodfried went into around $50,000 of credit card debt trying to fund the series. In October 2006, Lonelygirl15 partnered with the United Nations to make an advertisement for its Millennium Campaign's "Stand Up" anti-poverty project, in which Bree spoke to viewers about poverty and what could be done to stop it. Regarding the campaign, a writer for Gawker asked, "...does an internet celebrity carry any weight when said celebrity is more or less nonexistent?" Lonelygirl15 later became the first web series to include product placement when its creators signed a five-figure deal with Hershey's for Bree to chew Ice Breakers Sours gum in an episode in March 2007. The show's creators, worried that fans would be upset by product placement, posted a poll to the Lonelygirl15 website, to which 90 percent of respondents said they approved of the series using product integration. Around that same time, static pay-per-click advertisements were included at the end of episodes by Revver.

Lonelygirl15 signed a deal with now-defunct digital music store Amie Street in May 2007 to include music uploaded to the store in the series. In June 2007, while the show was being funded through fan donations, it was announced that Lonelygirl15 had signed a six-figure deal with Neutrogena to fund its second season, in which a "branded character"–Spencer Gilman, who worked for Neutrogena as a mad scientist–would appear. Bloggers and critics were polarized by the decision, which some described as innovative and others considered selling out. The show's end in 2008 was primarily due to a lack of funding as a result of the Great Recession.

=== Viewership ===
In order to increase the popularity of Lonelygirl15's early videos on YouTube, Beckett replied to every comment so that the videos would appear in YouTube's "most discussed" section. He also figured out what part of the videos YouTube's algorithm picked out a thumbnail from so that they could strategically place the best thumbnail at that point in the video, which yielded more views. "My Parents Suck", a video posted to Lonelygirl15's channel two weeks after "First Blog/Dorkiness Prevails", gained over 500,000 views in a week, with Flinders attributing the spike in viewership to Bree's relatability. Lonelygirl15 quickly became the most-subscribed channel on YouTube, surpassing geriatric1927, and 24 more videos were posted to the channel over the following three months, most of which appeared in YouTube's "most viewed" section.

By the time Lonelygirl15 was outed as a hoax, the series had accumulated over two million views on YouTube. Following the reveal that Lonelygirl15 was staged, its viewership tripled. By early 2007, the series was receiving about 300,000 to 900,000 views per episode, and, according to Bennett, it received the most views during the spring and summer of 2007. By the end of the series, each of its videos had collectively garnered over 60 million views on YouTube.

== Hoax ==
According to Goodfried, viewers began commenting on Lonelygirl15 channel's videos with accusations that they were scripted after the account posted its second or third video. Viewers found that Bree's life seemed too similar to common plot points found in fictional series, and were skeptical of her lack of response to the hoax accusations and her rising fame, the consistent neatness of her room, the lighting and editing in her videos, and a photo of occultist Aleister Crowley hanging above her bookshelf. Many guessed that each video had been filmed in the same time frame and edited to look like they were filmed individually. Viewers assumed that the series was part of an advertising campaign, particularly for a horror movie or for Target, the latter of which was based on one viewer matching the SKUs of Target items with items in Bree's bedroom. Others speculated that the videos might be part of an alternate reality game.

Discussions about the potential hoax took place in the forums on Lonelygirl15.com, which some users noticed had already been registered as a domain name by an anonymous buyer two weeks prior to Bree joining YouTube. Forum members surmised that Bree was based in Los Angeles in spite of her claim that she lived "100 miles from a mall", as the plants in her hiking videos, such as Nolina parryi, closely resembled those found in Los Angeles, and the music in her videos was often from unknown Los Angeles bands. Rose was also spotted at a Barnes & Noble in Santa Monica by a viewer, who later commented on a video about the encounter but denied that it was Rose. Forum members also discovered that Kenneth Goodfried, Greg Goodfried's father, had successfully applied for a trademark of the name Lonelygirl15.

In August 2006, three members of the forum—Shaina Wedmedyk, Chris Patterson, and an anonymous law student—embedded an IP address tracker to a fake Myspace profile under the name Seth and messaged Bree, and the IP address that viewed their profile was linked to Creative Artists Agency's private server. They reached out to journalist Richard Rushfield, who published their findings in the Los Angeles Times in September 2006. Weeks later, journalist Tom Foremski published discoveries made by his son, Matt Foremski, on his blog Silicon Valley Watcher, which revealed the true identity of Bree as Jessica Lee Rose. Matt Foremski found her identity through a cached version of her Myspace profile posted in a comment on TMZ's website. The New York Times also published an article confirming that Rose was the actress portraying Bree.

On September 7, 2006, a message was posted to Lonelygirl15.com, signed by "The Creators", in which they confirmed that the show was scripted and called Lonelygirl15 "the birth of a new art form."

== Other media ==
=== Spinoffs ===
After launching the production company LG15 Studios, Beckett and Goodfried created KateModern, a British Lonelygirl15 spinoff. It ran from July 2007 through June 2008 on Bebo, and took place in the same fictional universe. LG15 Studios became EQAL in 2008 after receiving $5 million from Spark Capital. EQAL's second Lonelygirl15 spinoff, LG15: The Resistance, premiered in September 2008, with 10-minute-long episodes being released weekly on YouTube, MySpaceTV, imeem, Veoh, and Hulu. It was produced by Amanda Goodfried, with Yusuf Pirhasan as director and Joshua Hale Fialkov as head writer. The series starred Jackson Davis and Alexandra Dreyfus, who reprised their roles as Jonas and Sarah, respectively, as they hunt down members of The Order. Since 2009, EQAL has aired two more spinoff series which are produced by contest winners, including LG15: The Last, which started airing in January 2009, and LG15: Outbreak, which began in January 2010.

=== Relaunch ===
In June 2016, on the tenth anniversary of the first video posted to the account, a trailer for a relaunch of Lonelygirl15 was posted to their YouTube channel, which featured Rose returning as Bree. The trailer was filmed two days before it was posted. Beckett planned the relaunch alongside Jenni Powell, a production assistant for the original series. Powell wrote in an email regarding the relaunch that the two hoped "to bring the show to a whole new audience while utilizing technologies that weren’t available 10 years ago to create new storytelling experiences." Speaking of the relaunch, Rose shared that a Snapchat channel for Daniel, a Facebook page, and an interactive website would all be involved, and clues about the series would appear in all three. Five installments were released on the Danielbeast YouTube channel in the months following, featuring Yousef Abu-Taleb and Katherine Pawlak reprising their roles as Daniel and Emma, respectively, along with an appearance by Maxwell Glick as Spencer. The relaunch was subsequently cancelled in November 2016.

== Reception ==
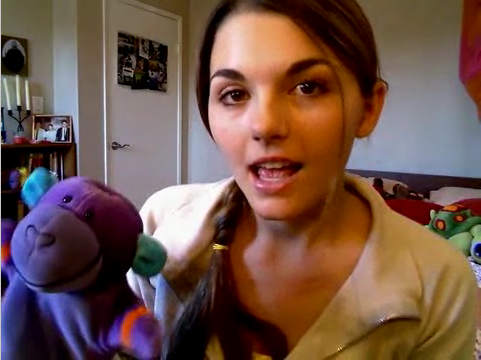
Bree as lonelygirl15 in a video blog

Joystiq's V. Cole praised the interactivity of Lonelygirl15 prior to its reveal as a scripted series, writing, "The interaction between whoever's producing these videos...and the millions of players is intricate, exciting, and very game-like at heart." In 2007, Robert Capps of Wired wrote that the plot of Lonelygirl15 "has morphed from early-year 90210 angst to a confusing poor-man's Alias". Helen A.S. Popkin of NBC News opined that the end of the first season was "tragic", but "somewhat anticlimactic" and "lackluster", calling the season's cross-country trip plot "convoluted" and calling Daniel "tiresome" as a character; Den of Geek's Sarah Dobbs also remarked that "the plot got more and more convoluted" as the series went on. Also in 2007, Virginia Heffernan wrote for The New York Times that there was "widespread animus" and "hostility" towards Lonelygirl15 due to the series growing "too big for its britches". In 2010, Time included Lonelygirl15 on their list of the 50 best YouTube videos of all time.

=== Legacy ===
For NBC News, Helen A.S. Popkin called Bree "the unofficial face of Web 2.0", and wrote that the success of Lonelygirl15 "was arguably a driving factor behind Google's $1.65 billion purchase of YouTube, as well as MySpace's addition of short-form video to its social networking site." For The Guardian, Elena Cresci described the series as YouTube's first web series, and wrote that it proved to the public that making YouTube videos could be profitable. Geoff Weiss wrote for Tubefilter that Lonelygirl15 was "light years ahead of the curve in terms of showcasing YouTube's potential as a platform for scripted content" and described its interactive content as "groundbreaking". In her 2014 book The Television Will Be Revolutionized, Amanda D. Lotz identified the premiere of Lonelygirl15 on YouTube as a key development in the digital distribution of television. Because of the videos' early popularity, Bree is often described by critics as the first viral YouTube star. The series has also been considered influential on vlogging, especially on YouTube, and online video-based storytelling. Kyle Kizu of IndieWire described Lonelygirl15 as "the series that defined YouTube-based vlog storytelling", also calling it "one of if not the first [series] of its kind." In 2016, The Verge's Sean O'Kane wrote that "the craziest thing about Lonelygirl15 is how prescient it was", as "Bree's vlogs don't look all that different from what you find on YouTube today." For New York, Adam Sternbergh described Lonelygirl15 as "the birth of WikiTV", which he defined as "a television show created by a broad community of participants and built not of sequential, hour-long episodes, but of two-minute interconnected parcels" wherein the storyline is "both linear...and expansive" and "anyone can join in."

Refinery29's Meghan De Maria called Lonelygirl15 "one of the first major Internet hoaxes", while Heather Saul of The Independent described it as "one of the biggest internet hoaxes of the decade." For Film Quarterly, Lucas Hilderbrand wrote that the hoax of Lonelygirl15 "called into question the authenticity of video blogs generally". In Time's 2006 edition of their Person of the Year issue, which focused on user-generated content online, Lev Grossman wrote, "Of course, in the post-Lonelygirl15 era, there's always that question mark: How authentic are these faces on the computer screen?" For Eureka Street, Marisa Pintado wrote that the exposure of Lonelygirl15 as a hoax was "perhaps the moment that [the YouTube] community lost its innocence", adding that it "prompted many to ask why we are still so trusting of what we find on the Internet." Flinders similarly said in an interview with The Guardian that Lonelygirl15 caused everyone to "never trust anyone on YouTube again at face value." Mashable's Tricia Gilbride wrote that "Lonelygirl15's legacy is the currency of uncertainty", calling the series "the first long con of the internet's attention economy -- the kind digital fame-seekers take for granted these days."

Various YouTubers, including the Green brothers, have cited Lonelygirl15 as what inspired them to join YouTube. The 2006 Law & Order: Criminal Intent episode "Weeping Willow", in which Michelle Trachtenberg played a vlogger named Willow, was based on Lonelygirl15.

=== Awards and nominations ===
Lonelygirl15 won the VH1 Big in '06 Award for Big Web Hit, and was nominated for Best Series at the inaugural YouTube Awards in 2007. For her performance in Lonelygirl15, Rose won the inaugural Webby Award for Best Actress at the 2007 Webby Awards.

== See also ==
- Marble Hornets
- List of most-subscribed YouTube channels

Achievements
| Preceded by geriatric1927 | Most Subscribed Channel on YouTube; 2006–2007 | Succeeded by Smosh |
