= LG15: Outbreak =

US television program

- Also known as: Outbreak
- Genre: Video blog, Drama
- Created by: Gregory Austin McConnell
- Developed by: Tempest Pictures
- Directed by: Gregory Austin McConnell; Lance Little
- Presented by: EQAL
- Starring: Gregory Austin McConnell; Danielle Martin; Lance Little
- Country of origin: United States
- Original language: English
- No. of seasons: 1
- No. of episodes: 42

Production
- Executive producer: EQAL
- Producers: Gregory Austin McConnell; Lance Little; Vincent Rouse
- Production locations: Christian County, Missouri
- Editors: Gregory Austin McConnell; Lance Little
- Running time: Varies from 0 to 9 minutes

Original release
- Network: LG15.com
- Release: January 11 – March 24, 2010

Related
- lonelygirl15 KateModern; LG15: The Resistance; N1ckola; LG15: The Last

LG15: Outbreak is a social show produced by lonelygirl15 fans in 2010, under the name of Tempest Pictures, and presented by EQAL on LG15.com. Due to the downturn in the economy, EQAL's show LG15: The Resistance was put on hiatus, and instead, the producers decided to open a contest for the fans. The contest allowed fans to submit pilot episodes and trailers of spin-off shows based on the Lonelygirl15 mythology, where the selected pilot would become an official LG15 Franchise show. The winner of the first season of "LG15: The Show Is Yours" was LG15: The Last, and LG15: Outbreak was declared the winner of the second season. At the time of the first contest, allowing a crowd-sourced project to take over production responsibilities was seen as "unprecedented".

The first teasers for the series, including the official submission, were posted in the quarter end of 2009, with the first episode premiering on January 11, 2010. The show ran for eight weeks, followed by a finale event on March 24, 2010 that consisted of a series of 12 videos posted over 12 hours, which had traditionally ended other lonelygirl15 series.

LG15: Outbreak was the sixth show in EQAL's LG15 Franchise. The show ended on a cliffhanger, leading many fans to believe that the series was setting up for the mother-ship series of LG15: The Resistance to return. However, on April 28, 2010, EQAL announced that new LG15 Universe content - outside of possible international licensing and the remainder of LG15: The Last - would not be produced in the foreseeable future.

In the years since LG15: Outbreak's conclusion, creator and star Austin McConnell (who has independently gained fame for his video essays) has been candid about issues with the production of the series and the final product.

== Cast of characters ==
- Gregory Austin McConnell as Gregory "Mason" Almeida, a member of the Resistance who tries to return to a normal life to correct the mistakes of his past, but ultimately discovers that he can't hide from the Order.
- Dani Martin as Crystal O'Brien, Mason's younger sister and a college dropout. She has deep emotional issues from being abandoned by her brother as a child, and may not be as innocent as she seems.
- Lance Little as William Powers, Crystal's new neighbor who finds himself in the middle of a battle between SHENtek and The Resistance. Socially awkward, he attempts to woo Crystal while holding onto some semblance of a normal life.

== Synopsis ==
The show followed a girl named Crystal who packs up her entire life and moves to a new town to start over. Along the way, she meets questionable characters, becomes reunited with her brother, and becomes involved with a new faction of the Order called SHENtek.
