= Glorkian Warrior: The Trials of Glork =

2014 video game

Glorkian Warrior: The Trials Of Glork
- Developer: PixelJAM Games
- Publishers: PixelJAM Games; Noodlecake Studios Inc. (Android)
- Platforms: iOS, Microsoft Windows, OS X, Android
- Release: iOS; March 13, 2014; Windows, OS X November 11, 2014; Android; March 12, 2015
- Genre: Shooter
- Mode: Single-player

Glorkian Warrior: The Trials of Glork is a shooter game developed by PixelJAM Games for iOS, Microsoft Windows, and OS X in 2014, and for Android in 2015.

== Reception ==
Reception

Aggregate score
Aggregator	Score
Metacritic	(PC) 80/100 (iOS) 77/100

Review scores
Publication	Score
Gamezebo	(iOS) 80/100
MacLife	(iOS)
Pocket Gamer	(iOS)
TouchArcade	(iOS)

The iOS and PC versions received "generally favorable reviews" according to the review aggregation website Metacritic.
