= Potatoman Seeks the Troof =

2012 video game

- Developer: PixelJAM Games
- Publisher: PixelJAM Games
- Release: 2012
- Genre: Platformer
- Mode: Single-player

Potatoman Seeks the Troof is a 2012 Flash platformer from American game developer PixelJAM Games. It was included as one of 7 "Digital Select" titles for the IndieCade independent games festival in 2013 and received an honorable mention at the Independent Games Festival 2014 (but no nomination). The protagonist of the game—a potato—must maneuver through levels themed as desert wastelands, thick forests and dystopian cities.

An updated version was rereleased on Steam in 2014. The game was also released for iOS in 2015.

== Reception ==
The game has been described as mechanically bare-bones yet very challenging. The controls were criticized in both the Flash game and the smartphone version.
