= Before the Fire =

2020 American film

- Film poster
- Directed by: Charlie Buhler
- Written by: Jenna Lyng Adams
- Produced by: Charlie Buhler; Kristen Murtha
- Starring: Jenna Lyng Adams; Jackson Davis; Ryan Vigilant
- Cinematography: Drew Bienemann
- Edited by: Brian Denny
- Music by: Adam Robl; Shawn Sutta
- Distributed by: Dark Sky Films
- Release date: March 7, 2020 (Cinequest)
- Country: United States
- Language: English

Before the Fire is a 2020 American thriller drama film directed by Charlie Buhler. Before the Fire received acclaim as a frightening and timely look at how individual lives are turned upside down by a global crisis. The feature had its world premiere at the Cinequest Film Festival in March 2020.

== Plot summary ==
The film follows a Hollywood actress whose rising career is cut short when an influenza pandemic sends her back to the small town she fled years before. She soon finds something more dangerous than any virus waiting for her.

== Plot Synopsis ==
Ava Boone is an actress who plays the lead in a television show called She Wolf while living in Los Angeles, CA. Her boyfriend and long-time childhood friend, Kelly Rhodes, is a photojournalist. The film opens as the world is suffering under an extremely deadly flu pandemic with air traffic and international travel being shut down. Kelly is able to charter a private plane to fly them to their rural hometown in Delmont, South Dakota to escape the plague. However, Kelly stays behind in order to document the pandemic despite Ava's pleas and distress.

Ava is picked up at the rural airport by Kelly's brother, Max Rhodes, who is not happy that Kelly stayed behind but sent Ava. While Ava's past is never fully explained, it is heavily implied that she ran away from home in her late teens and Kelly followed her to Los Angeles. A military checkpoint has been setup in town to only allow residents inside.

Ava helps Max and his diabetic mother, Betsy, around the Rhodes family farm outside of the town. While initially hostile to Ava, Max warms up to her over the following days as she works on the farm. Ava refuses to answer Kelly's phone calls for abandoning her at the airport. News indicates the pandemic continues to worsen as the United States declares martial law. The family is fairly self-sufficient with their own water, food stores, gasoline generator, and solar power panels unlike others in the area.

In the evening, Max and Ava visit a local bar so Max can settle some affairs with the local bar owner. Max is approached by Bob who is trying to form a local militia as the government is losing control of the crisis. Max declines despite threats from Bob. While leaving, Ava is spotted by her abusive father, Jasper Boone, who becomes hostile and demands that she return to the family home. When Max learns that his farmhand, Jake, has joined Bob's militia, he tells Jake not to come back.

Betsy is beginning to get sick as her insulin is starting to run out. Ava leaves a voice mail for Kelly begging him to come home. Ava has Max show her how to shoot to help protect them as the crisis worsens. Upon returning home, Ava finds that her mother, Maddy Boone, has come to visit. While initially sweet and nice, Ava's mother quickly begins asking for money to "get back on her feet." Ava chides her mother for her drinking and ignoring her father's abusive behavior to Ava. She gives her mother money and tells her never to come back. Later in the evening, Ava shows Max a nearby rundown home that she would hide at when trying to get away from her father.

Max and Ava find Betsy collapsed in the house as her insulin has run out. They both head into town to find insulin against Betsy's protests. However, they are stopped by Bob, Jake, and Jasper who have murdered a family with children on the road. The two return home after Jasper shoots out one of their tires. At night, Jasper offers insulin if Ava will return home with him. Max insists they not take the deal thinking that it is a deception. Believing Jasper has left, Max goes outside to investigate only to be shot by Jasper hiding in the darkness. Bob and Jake then take Ava into the house and murder Betsy.

Sometime later, Ava is hiding at the rundown house after escaping her captors but she is quickly recaptured after inadvertently hitching a ride with a flu-infected woman. At the same time, Kelly has returned to town to find the town deserted and the military men at the checkpoint dead from the flu. A fourth militia man at the house, who showed signs of infection, is shot by Jasper. Ava tries to seduce Jake to escape and unsuccessfully tries to strangle him. While escaping, she stabs Bob to death with his own knife.

Upon arriving at the rundown house, Ava prepares to leave but begins coughing blood, a sign of flu infection. She finds a stalled car and discovers a picture of herself taken by Kelly. Returning home, Ava finds her father holding Kelly at gunpoint. Jasper demands that Ava return the guns that she stole when fleeing the house in exchange for Kelly. However, after Ava is gone, Jasper sends Jake out with Kelly to shoot and bury him next to Max and Betsy's graves.

Ava takes Jasper to the rundown house where the guns are stored. While trying to reach for the guns, Jasper's arm gets caught in a bear trap left by Ava. Ava then sets the old house on fire with Jasper trapped inside and watches it burn to the ground. In the morning, Ava wakes to see that Kelly has found her after Jake was unable to go through with killing him. Exhausted and sick, Ava struggles to speak as Kelly comes closer.

== Cast ==
- Jenna Lyng Adams as Ava Boone (Amanda)
- Ryan Vigilant as Max Rhodes
- Jackson Davis as Kelly Rhodes
- Charles Hubbell as Jasper Boone
- Dakota Morrissiey as Jake
- MJ Karmi as Betsy Rhodes
- Tim Driscoll as Bob
- Lisa Goodman as Maddy Boone

== Production ==
A still from the film

Principal photography for Before the Fire began in February, 2019 in South Dakota. The crew shot 11 days on two family farms near the small towns of Delmont and Letcher, South Dakota. Once they wrapped the winter, the whole team took a few months off to regroup, and returned in July, 2019 to film in the intense South Dakota summer.

Director Charlie Buhler said in an interview, "We fought to make this movie because we felt that there was a very specific expectation about the types of stories women were able to tell. Jenna and I both love action and sci-fi, so we wanted to make a female protagonist that we women could really rally behind." Jenna Lyng Adams, added, "Growing up in Minnesota, I've always been drawn to stories about remote communities and places. The rural Midwest is already isolated in ways, but a global emergency could push it even more so. I wanted to make a story about a woman reinventing herself over and over again to survive."

== Release ==
The film premiered at the 2020 Cinequest Film Festival. It also screened at the 2020 Manchester International Film Festival. Its festival run soon came to a halt due to the COVID-19 pandemic. The film garnered attention due to its striking similarity to the pandemic.

== Reception ==
Liz Whittemore of the Alliance of Female Film Journalists said the film "is about trauma, family dynamics, fear, betrayal, and power. It will pull you in from the very first moments and not let up until the credits." Dark Sky Films' Nicola Goelzhaeuser said, "Before the Fire arrives as the world is caught in an existential crisis, but it is really a timeless achievement that reveals how far people will go to survive."
