= Gamma Bros =

2006 video game

- Developer: PixelJAM Games
- Publisher: PixelJAM Games
- Producer: Mark Denardo
- Programmers: Miles Tilmann, Wayne Marsh
- Artist: Richard Grillotti
- Platform: macOS; Microsoft Windows
- Release: 2006
- Genre: Shoot 'em up
- Mode: Single-player

Gamma Bros is a 2006 Flash shoot 'em up game developed and published by American game indie studio PixelJAM Games, released as a free online title. It was nominated for "Best Web Browser Game" at the 2007 Independent Games Festival. It was the studio's first game after the mini-game Ratmaze. The game was also released as a smartphone game in 2016.

In the game, the player takes control of brothers Buzz and Zap Gamma who are on their way home from a galactic commute and must survive hordes of oncoming enemies.
