= PixelJAM Games =

American video game development studio

- Industry: Video game Developer
- Founded: 2005; 21 years ago
- Founders: Miles Tilmann; Rich Grillotti
- Headquarters: Asheville, North Carolina, United States
- Number of employees: 5 (2015)
- Website: www.pixeljam.com

PixelJAM Games is an American independent video game studio run by Richard Grillotti (b. 1972), Miles Tilmann and A.D. Bakke, known for their pixellated Flash games that "toy with traditional genres, but have quirky ideas and touches." Their most notable games include Dino Run, Gamma Bros, and Potatoman Seeks the Troof.

== History ==
The name "PixelJam" comes from an "abstract pixel animation art experiment/site" that Richard Grilloti was playing around with in the late 1990s. Around 2004, he and his friend from college, Miles Tilmann, made their first game, also collaborating with 8bit musician Mark Denardo. Grilloti and Tilman were originally both based in Chicago, then the studio went virtual for a couple of years when Grilloti lived in Oregon, but both Grilloti and Tilman later moved to Asheville, North Carolina. The studio has made many games for Adult Swim. In 2015, the studio had 5 employees.

In 2007, PixelJAM developed a Flash shoot 'em up game, called Gamma Bros. It was nominated for "Best Web Browser Game" at the Independent Games Festival. The player takes control of brothers Buzz and Zap Gamma who are on their way home from a galactic commute and must survive hordes of oncoming enemies.

In November 2013, PixelJam launched a Kickstarter campaign for a sequel to Dino Run, but it failed to achieve its funding goal. A second campaign in 2018 succeeded. The game remains unreleased.

In September 2024, PixelJam and Datassette released UTOPIA MUST FALL into early access on Steam, moving away from pixel art and into Vector Graphics on their own custom V99 game engine. The player controls a city's turret and must fight off endless waves of alien invaders trying to destroy it. The game remains in early access.

== Games ==
- Cookie Party 2
- Corporate Climber
- Cream Wolf -
- Dino Run
- Dino Run DX
- Dino Run: Marathon of Doom
- Dino Run: Enter Planet D
- Dino Run SE
- Gamma Bros
- Glorkian Warrior: The Trials of Glork
- Hipster Kickball
- Last Horizon
- Mountain Maniac
- Mountain Maniac Xmas
- Pizza City!
- Potatoman Seeks the Troof
- Ratmaze
- Ratmaze 2
- Ratmaze Nightmare
- Sausage Factory
- Snowball
- Turbo Granny
- UTOPIA MUST FALL
- Grid Ranger
