= Dino Run =

2008 video game

- Developer: PixelJAM Games
- Release: April 30, 2008
- Genre: Side-scroller
- Modes: Single-player, multiplayer

Dino Run is a Flash game created by PixelJAM and XGen Studios, released on April 30, 2008. The player steers a Velociraptor through increasingly dangerous side-scrolling landscapes to escape an impending "wall of doom". The game uses simple pixel art and 8-bit sound to replicate the style of 1980s arcade games. Dino Run was conceived by PixelJAM co-founder Richard Grillotti while he was sketching dinosaurs.

Expanded and improved versions of the game were later released for Macintosh, PC, and Linux under the titles Dino Run SE (2011) and Dino Run DX (2015).

== Legacy ==
Two additional games, Dino Run: Marathon of Doom (2011) and Dino Run: Enter Planet D (2013), were released as stand-alone titles.

In November 2013, PixelJam launched a Kickstarter fundraising campaign to finance development of Dino Run 2. The game would introduce new dinosaurs, including Triceratops, Parasaurolophus, Pachycephalosaurus, and Archaeopteryx. The fundraiser sought $175,000, but ended a month later, raising only $83,476. Another Kickstarter campaign succeeded in being funded in 2018, with a projected release date in November 2019. As of August 2025, the sequel remains unreleased. In September 2025 PixelJam launched their final Kickstarter campaign for Dino Run pertaining to its early access launch and reached their funding goal of $10,000 in under 7 hours.
