= KateModern =

- Genre: Drama; Comedy; Videoblog; Web series
- Created by: Miles Beckett; Greg Goodfried
- Directed by: Miles Beckett; Luke Taylor; Gavin Rowe
- Starring: Alexandra Weaver; Tara Rushton; Ralf Little; Jai Rajani; Giles Alderson; Lucinda Rhodes-Flaherty; Sam Donovan; Matthew Gammie; Emma Pollard
- Country of origin: United Kingdom
- Original language: English
- No. of seasons: 2
- No. of episodes: 312

Production
- Executive producers: Miles Beckett; Greg Goodfried; Joanna Shields; Amanda Goodfried
- Producers: Pete Gibbons; Kelly Brett
- Production locations: London, England
- Editor: Yusuf Pirhasan
- Running time: Varies

Original release
- Network: Bebo
- Release: 16 July 2007 – 28 June 2008

Related
- Lonelygirl15; LG15: The Resistance; N1ckola; LG15: The Last; LG15: Outbreak

KateModern is the sister series of lonelygirl15. The web series, which was announced on 16 July 2007, began filming on 9 July and the first video, Fight and Flight, was released on 16 July. It was produced by EQAL in partnership with Bebo. The series ended on 28 June 2008, slightly less than a year following its original release.

KateModern is set in East London, England, and bears many similarities to its parent series. Both Kate and Bree are avid video bloggers and carry a dark secret. The series takes the ongoing story from the lonelygirl15 series, transposing it against a London backdrop. Major plot lines and story arcs are related between both series. Several characters from both series have communicated with each other, and a formal two-week cross-over was run between them in April 2008. There is an alternate reality game component of the series as well.

KateModern was the second interactive online series developed by LG15 Studios. Like lonelygirl15, KateModern included product integration as an original marketing solution. KateModern was the first truly interactive show online, which utilizes the tools available on Bebo to help fans interact.

KateModern videos first appeared on Bebo and lg15.com, then with a delay of at least 24 hours on YouTube. It attracted an average of 1.5 million views per episode.

The title is a pun on the famous London art museum, the Tate Modern.

== Ratings ==
=== Season 1: (2007) ===
Season one followed a young avid blogger, Kate, and her friends as she discovers the truth behind the meaning of her abnormal blood type "trait positive" and the secret organization after it. This was from the creators of lonelygirl15, the extremely popular online internet video-log. In its first season, it garnered more than 1.5 million viewers a week, receiving over 35 million views between the time of its launch and the season one finale, according to its producers.

=== Season 2: (2008) ===
Season two continued the adventures of Kate's friends as they try to discover who killed Kate in the season 1 finale. It rose in popularity, at one point garnering up to 2.5 million viewers a week.

A twelve-hour marathon entitled "Precious Blood" took place on 5 April 2008, in which viewers could give advice to Charlie and the other characters. Despite the show's popularity, the creators decided to cut the series off at the culmination of its second season with a second twelve-hour marathon entitled "The Last Work" on 28 June 2008.

== Cast of characters ==
- Alexandra Weaver as Genevieve "Kate" Strathcorran, a young artist from London who was tracked by the Order for her blood. She is seduced into joining the Order by her idol, and is ultimately murdered when she escapes from the Order and leaves her friends, trying to help the other trait positive girls.
- Tara Rushton as Charlie, Kate's best friend who almost loses everything she has in order to protect her loved ones from the Order. Originally from Australia, she struggles with homesickness and often references Australian culture.
- Ralf Little as Gavin Taylore, a love interest of Charlie who blames Kate for his mental breakdown after his life begins to fall apart. He and Tariq started a software company whose chief product broke several privacy laws and was stolen by Lee.
- Jai Rajani as Tariq Bhartti, Kate's ex-boyfriend who tries to remove himself from her dangerous situation. After Kate is murdered and the company fails, he gives up on his life in London and flees to India to get a fresh start.
- Giles Alderson as Steve Roberts, a member of the Hymn of One who befriends Kate and later Charlie. He initially refuses to believe in the existence of the Order, but later turns against them after discovering that they were behind Kate's death.
- Lucinda Rhodes Flaherty as Julia Cowan, Tariq's ex-girlfriend who is drawn into his battle against the Order. Falling for a high-ranking member of the Hymn of One, her loyalties are tested and she ultimately betrays the K-Team.
- Sam Donovan as Lee Phillips, An intern for GT&T who stole Tariq and Gavin's software in revenge for the abuse they inflicted on him. Later on, he makes amends and joins forces with the K-Team, and his love interest Sophie, against the Order.
- Matthew Gammie as Terrence, GT&T's investor who initially battled the Order to obtain stolen software, but later joined forces with them when an opportunity arose to achieve money and power, even through grisly acts of violence.
- Emma Pollard as Lauren, a young trait positive girl whose sister was murdered by the Order. In retaliation, she joins forces with the FTO and takes the fight to them, and later must deal with the consequences of her actions.
