= 2007 Webby Awards =

US internet awards ceremony

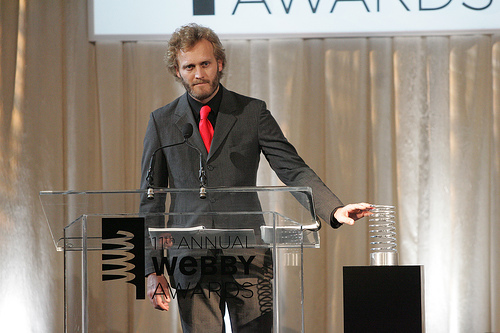
Nicolas Roope of London agency Poke London, receiving a Webby for Banking/Bill paying in 2007 for designing the Zopa site

The 11th annual 2007 Webby Awards were held in New York City on June 3, 2007. They were hosted by comedian Rob Corddry and were judged by the International Academy of Digital Arts and Sciences. The ceremony saw 8,000 entries from over 60 countries and all 50 United States. Lifetime achievement awards were given to David Bowie and YouTube founders Chad Hurley and Steve Chen. This award ceremony for the first time introduced category awards beyond Websites in the three new super-categories: Interactive Advertising, Mobile & Apps, and Online Film & Video.

== Nominees and winners ==
(from http://www.webbyawards.com/winners/2007)

Category	Webby Award winner	People's Voice winner	Other nominees
Games	Samorost 2 (Archived 9 June 2007 via Wayback); Amanita Design	Miniclip (Archived 1 June 2007 via Wayback); Miniclip Ltd	American Dad vs. Family Guy Kung Fu (Archived 22 February 2007 via Wayback); Fuel Industries
Games	Samorost 2 (Archived 9 June 2007 via Wayback); Amanita Design	Miniclip (Archived 1 June 2007 via Wayback); Miniclip Ltd	SOAPnet's Fantasy Soap League (http://www.fantasysoapnet.com/); SOAPnet
Games	Samorost 2 (Archived 9 June 2007 via Wayback); Amanita Design	Miniclip (Archived 1 June 2007 via Wayback); Miniclip Ltd	ZWoK! (Archived 29 May 2007 via Wayback); Bloc Media
Games-Related	Gamasutra.com (Archived 6 June 2007 via Wayback); CMP Game Group	GameSpot (Archived 2 June 2007 via Wayback); CNET Networks	GameDaily.com (Archived 5 June 2007 via Wayback); AOL
Games-Related	Gamasutra.com (Archived 6 June 2007 via Wayback); CMP Game Group	GameSpot (Archived 2 June 2007 via Wayback); CNET Networks	LEGO Star Wars II (Archived 2 June 2007 via Wayback); Summit Projects
Games-Related	Gamasutra.com (Archived 6 June 2007 via Wayback); CMP Game Group	GameSpot (Archived 2 June 2007 via Wayback); CNET Networks	Thrillville (Archived 26 February 2007 via Wayback); KNI
Interactive Advertising - Game or Application	The Hunt (Archived 3 June 2007 via Wayback); Euro RSCG 4D	ESPN 360 Bar Sports (Archived 31 May 2007 via Wayback); 15 letters inc.	Build Your Own World (Archived 29 May 2007 via Wayback); Veer
Interactive Advertising - Game or Application	The Hunt (Archived 3 June 2007 via Wayback); Euro RSCG 4D	ESPN 360 Bar Sports (Archived 31 May 2007 via Wayback); 15 letters inc.	Johnnie Walker - The Keep Version 2.0 (Archived 16 May 2007 via Wayback); ID Society
Interactive Advertising - Game or Application	The Hunt (Archived 3 June 2007 via Wayback); Euro RSCG 4D	ESPN 360 Bar Sports (Archived 31 May 2007 via Wayback); 15 letters inc.	Yaris vs. Yaris Multiplayer Driving Game (Archived 28 May 2007 via Wayback); Saatchi & Saatchi LA
This table is not complete, please help to complete it from material on this page.

== Honorees ==
- Romeo Theater in "Comedy: Long Form or Series" category
