= EQAL =

- Official Company Logo
- Industry: Entertainment, Technology
- Founded: Los Angeles, California, USA (2008)
- Fate: acquired by Everyday Health
- Headquarters: Los Angeles, CA, USA
- Key people: Miles Beckett, CEO/Founder; Greg Goodfried, President/Founder; Paras Maniar, CSO and EVP, Corporate Development; Robert Weiss, Chief Operating Officer
- Products: Celebrity Influencer Networks; Branded Entertainment; Web Series; Website Hosting Software (Umbrella)
- Website: http://www.eqal.com

EQAL was a media and technology company founded in 2008 by Miles Beckett and Greg Goodfried, two of the creators of lonelygirl15. EQAL built influencer networks around celebrities, consumer brands, and intellectual properties. Prior to building influencer networks, EQAL produced lonelygirl15 (LG15) as well as for producing other series in the LG15 Universe (the universe using the mythology started by the lonelygirl15 series) including KateModern in association with Bebo and LG15: The Resistance, as well as Harper’s Globe, the original web series, commissioned by CBS as a tie-in for the series, Harper’s Island. In 2012, Everyday Health acquired EQAL.

== History ==
In 2006, Miles Beckett met Mesh Flinders, a screenwriter, at a birthday party. Beckett had the idea to use short internet videos to tell a story. Flinders had developed a character that he thought would be perfect for the project. Together the two of them contacted Greg Goodfried for legal advice, and the three of them subsequently created lonelygirl15. The group became formally known as LG15 Studios/Telegraph Ave. Productions.

While Mesh Flinders went on to pursue other endeavors at the end of 2007, in April 2008, Beckett and Goodfried announced the formation of EQAL. The new company raised $5 million in venture capital. Among EQAL’s initial investors were Spark Capital, Marc Andreessen, co-founder of Netscape, Conrad Riggs, formerly with Mark Burnett Productions, tech investor Ron Conway, and Georges Harik, former developer of new products at Google.

In May 2008, a partnership between EQAL and CBS was announced to create new original programming and online tie-ins for CBS network shows. A few months later, it was announced that EQAL would produce the Harper's Globe online companion show for CBS's Harper's Island. Through the CBS deal, EQAL met Anthony E. Zuiker, creator of CSI, and was hired by Zuiker to create the online component for Zuiker's first novel, Level 26, which was released in September 2009. The Zuiker partnership was the first in a series of similar media partnerships.

In 2009, EQAL launched two new original web series with dedicated social networks: Get Cookin for Food Network host Paula Deen and The Kind Life With Alicia Silverstone for Silverstone about global warming and vegetarian topics.

In 2010, EQAL launched The Real Women of Philadelphia with Digitas for Kraft Foods and Paula Deen which went on to garner a gold Effie award in 2011. EQAL continued to launch celebrity sites in association with Skinny Bitch and Made Just Right with Earth Balance.

In 2011, Robert Weiss joined EQAL, launching their Media Networks division to build social networks around celebrities and influencers. They have launched nearly 40 sites with another 10 expected this year. EQAL and its Media Networks recently won 6 Awards of Distinction from the International Academy of Visual Arts.

In October 2011, YouTube announced an initiative to fund the production of new channels containing original "premium" content. EQAL became one of the first partners in this program, launching a fashion-oriented channel known as u look haute on April 3, 2012.

In September 2012, Everyday Health acquired EQAL. The company become an entity within its lifestyle division.

== Products ==
=== Original Productions ===
- lonelygirl15
- KateModern
- LG15: The Resistance
- N1ckola
- Harper’s Globe
- Get Cookin' With Paula Deen

=== Other Original Content ===
- LG15: The Last
- LG15: Outbreak

=== Software ===
- Umbrella
