= LG15: The Resistance =

- Also known as: The Resistance, TR
- Genre: Video blog, Drama
- Created by: Miles Beckett; Greg Goodfried; Amanda Goodfried
- Written by: Joshua Hale Fialkov; Jim Campolongo
- Directed by: Yusuf Pirhasan; Ram Paul Silbey
- Starring: Jackson Davis; Alexandra Dreyfus; Marnette Patterson; Brett Ryback
- Country of origin: United States
- Original language: English
- No. of seasons: 1
- No. of episodes: 13 (weekly recaps)

Production
- Executive producers: Miles Beckett; Amanda Goodfried; Greg Goodfried; Joshua Hale Fialkov
- Producers: James R. Sterling; Lynn Kramer; Sara Clarkin
- Production location: United States
- Cinematography: Kevin Schlanser
- Editors: Jerry Pyle; Chris Ryder; James Renfroe
- Running time: Varies from 6-10 minutes
- Production company: EQAL

Original release
- Network: LG15.com
- Release: September 20 – December 12, 2008

Related
- lonelygirl15; KateModern; N1ckola; LG15: The Last; LG15: Outbreak

LG15: The Resistance (September 20, 2008—December 12, 2008) is a web series produced by EQAL that took place within the LG15 Universe. The series was first announced on July 4, 2008, via the official behind-the-scenes LG15 blog, Inside. It premiered on September 16, 2008, at the New York Television Festival, and was first uploaded for public viewing on September 20, 2008. Daily content was provided in the form of video blogs, images, text blogs, and other information posted daily from the characters at LG15.com. On the following Saturday, all of the content from the previous week was compiled into one 6- to 10-minute episode to end that week's "chapter". Each week of the show featured music from a different artist.

== Main cast ==
- Jackson Davis as Jonas Wharton
- Alexandra Dreyfus as Sarah Genatiempo
- Marnette Patterson as Maggie Schaeffer
- Brett Ryback as Reed Barnes

== See also ==
- EQAL
- lonelygirl15
