= Augsburger Puppenkiste =

German puppet theater company

Coordinates: 48°21′37″N 10°54′12″E

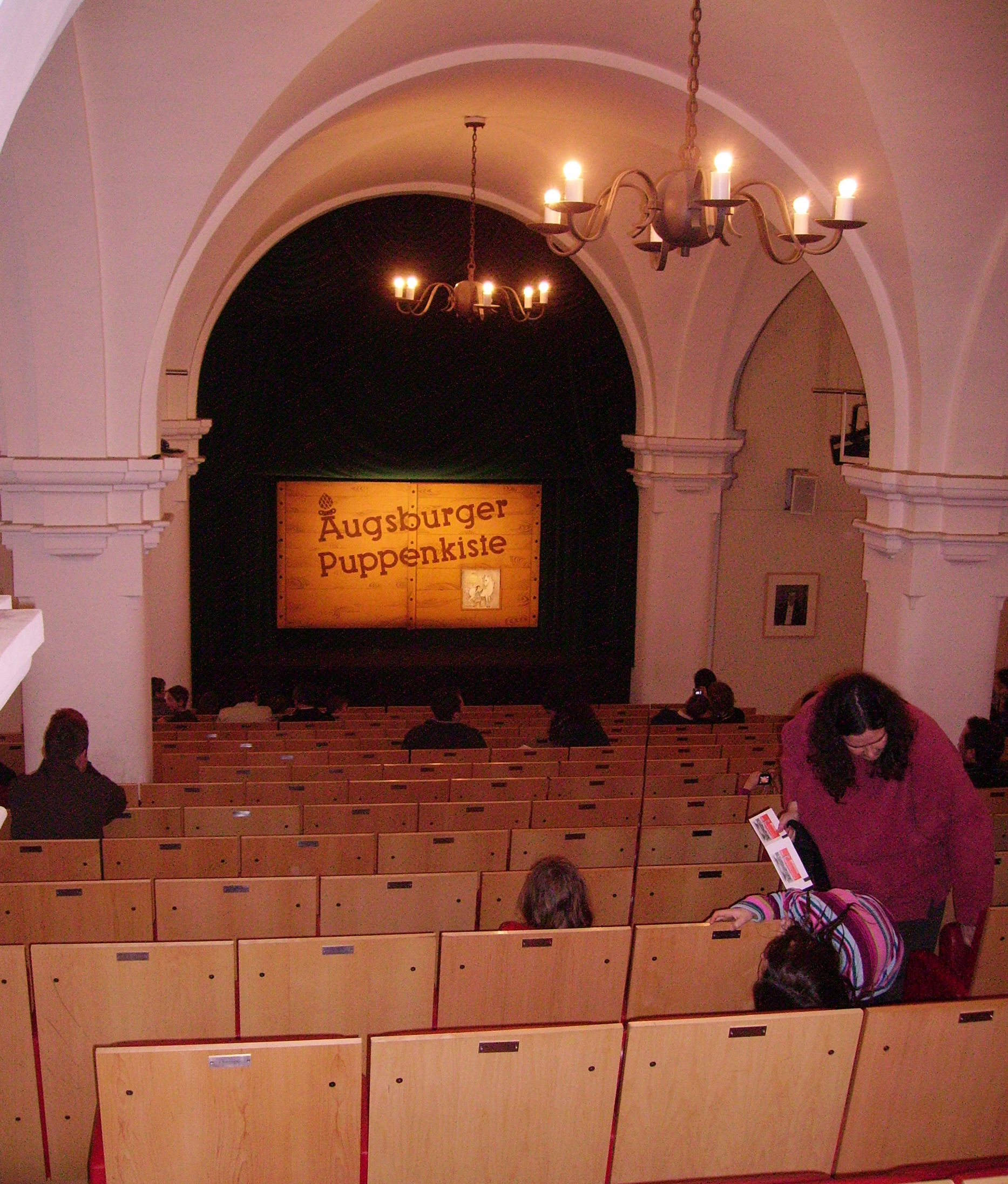
Stage of the Augsburger Puppenkiste

The Augsburger Puppenkiste (German for: Augsburg Puppetchest) is a marionette theater in Augsburg, Germany.

It is located at the former Heilig-Geist-Spital in the historic center of Augsburg. Since 1948, the "Augsburger Puppenkiste" had been producing theatrical adaptations of fairy tales and serious pieces. In 1953, it began producing television series and gained nationwide prominence with productions, such as Jim Knopf und Lukas der Lokomotivführer and Urmel aus dem Eis.

== The Puppenkiste (puppet chest): A family business ==
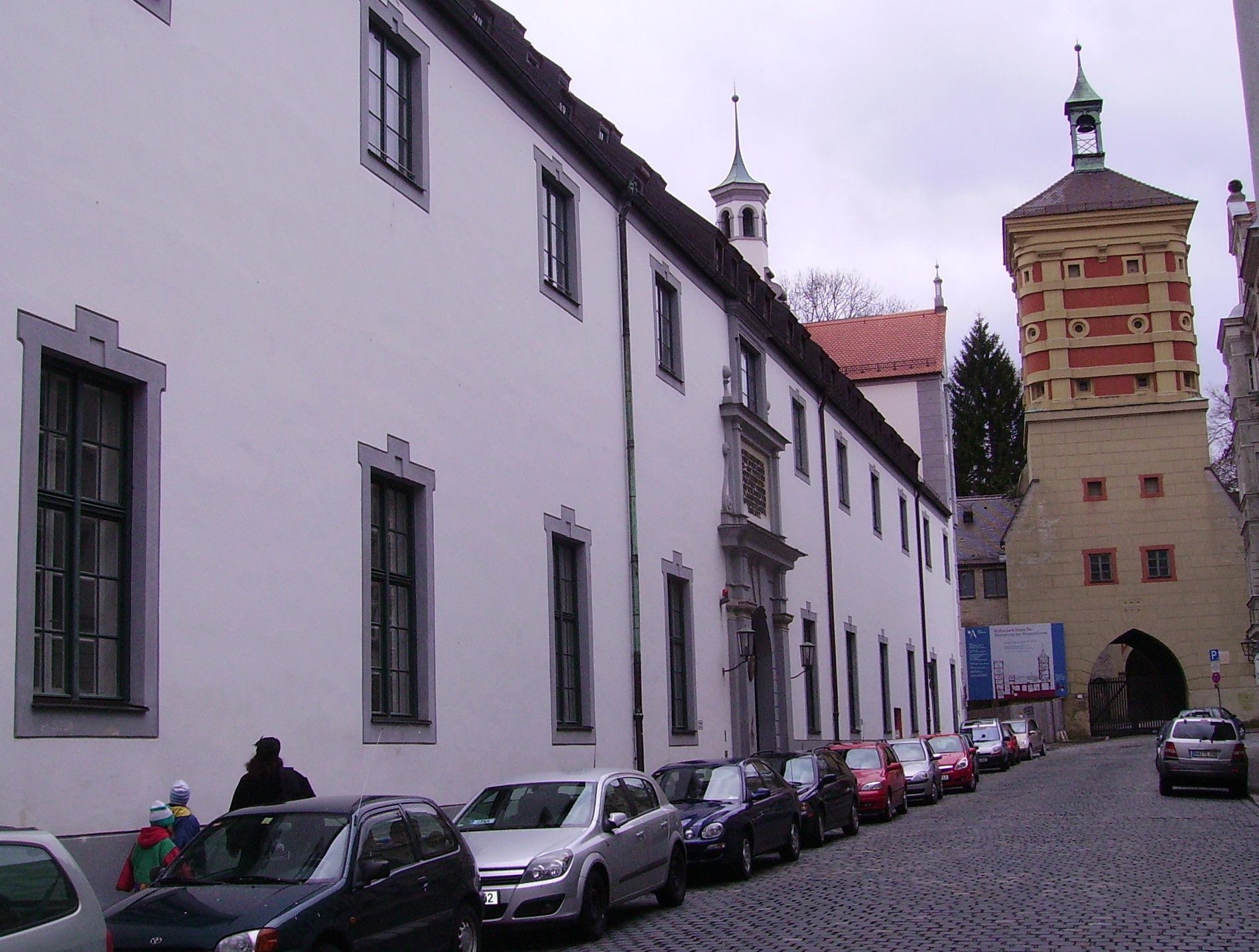
Building at Spitalgasse in Augsburg, Germany

In 1943, Walter Oehmichen (1901–1977) founded his own small puppet theater together with his wife Rose Oehmichen (1901–1985) and their daughters Hannelore (1931–2003) and Ulla: the Puppenschrein, a puppet theatre which consisted of a small wooden stage that could be set up in a door frame. In the night of February 26, 1944, this stage was destroyed in a fire following a bomb assault in Augsburg. The figures, however, remained undamaged - luckily Walter Oehmichen took them home after performing for the kids of the stage members in the city theatre of Augsburg. Both the city theatre and the Puppenschrein within were almost completely destroyed by flames. Today, only one ornament from the original shrine is left.

After the war, Walter Oehmichen began planning a new puppet theatre. At the former Heilig-Geist Hospital, he found a room to perform his shows. First, however, Oehmichen had to share the premises with the city's Office of Statistics.

Despite all odds of the post-war period, the Oehmichen family was able to re-open the marionette theater as "Augsburger Puppenkiste" with the play Der gestiefelte Kater (Puss in Boots) on 26 February 1948 – exactly four years after the puppet shrine was destroyed. The first puppeteers and speakers were young actors from Augsburg – among others, Manfred Jenning. He would soon become the staff writer for the Augsburger Puppenkiste and in 1951 he established the year-end puppet cabaret show for adults, which has since become a yearly tradition. The first cabaret premiere was on 31 December 1950.

At first, Walter Oehmichen whittled the puppets himself, but he soon passed this important job on to his daughter Hannelore. She created all the puppets which would soon be well known as the "stars on strings". Hannelore whittled her first puppet at the age of 13. She had to keep her work a secret, because at this time she wasn't allowed to use the sharp woodcarving knife. The first of her puppets to become famous was The Little Prince (a character from Antoine de Saint-Exupéry's famous novel). In the first public performance of the Puppenkiste, Puss in Boots, Hannelore was responsible for manipulating Puss. Oehmichens wife Rose made all the clothes for the marionettes and lent her voice to many of the mother and grandmother characters.

In 1973, following the 25th anniversary of the Puppenkiste, Hannelore and her husband Hanns-Joachim Marschall took over the management. Hanns-Joachim Marschall, who was an actor, had already worked for the Puppenkiste in previous years. Walter Oehmichen died in 1977, but up to his death he supported the theatre. Rose Oehmichen died in 1985. Following Rose Oehmichens death, her daughter Hannelore inherited the Puppenkiste.

Since the beginning of the 1980s Klaus Marschall, the son of Hannelore and Hanns-Joachim Marschall, has been working in the theater. He took over the management from his parents in 1992. Hanns-Joachim Marschall retired from the theater and died in 1999. His wife Hannelore, however, continued to carve the figures and supported the theater again and again. Klaus's brother Jürgen stepped into/entered the business at the beginning of the 1990s/ got involved in the Puppenkiste in the 1990s and helped his mother to produce the puppets. He accepted her inheritance after her death on May 16, 2003. In the course of years the space at the Rotes-Tor building became too small for the theater. Within the means of the reconstruction of the Heilig-Geist-Spital and plans for the park Kulturpark Rotes Tor further premises were provided by the city of Augsburg in 2000. A new theatre hall, which is located exactly opposite to the old one, was established and opened in October 2000. In 2004, the Augsburger Puppenkiste won the Golden Camera, a well-known German film award.

== The origin of the name "Augsburger Puppenkiste" and the famous box tops ==
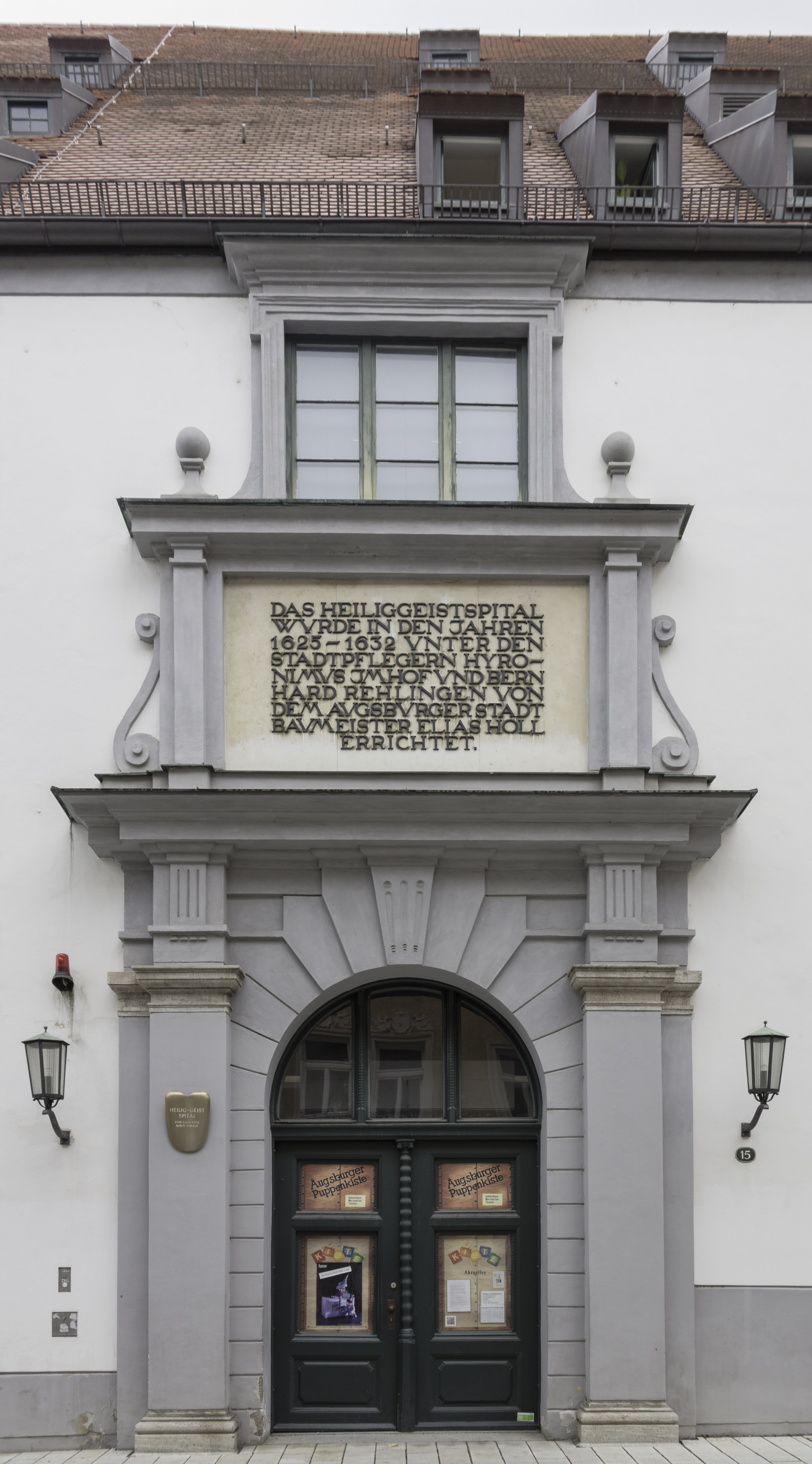
Entrance

The name "Puppenkiste" (puppet box or puppet chest) goes back to the founder of the theatre, Walter Oehmichen. When his first puppet theatre was destroyed in a fire, he wanted to create a new one which was easily transportable. He came up with the idea of a wooden transport box, in which he stored all of his puppets and the actual puppet theatre.

The wooden box not only features prominently in the name of the theatre, but also inspired the trade mark of the Puppenkiste: the representation of the two top cover flaps of a wooden box. Across the top covers, the name "Augsburger Puppenkiste" is printed, along with the addition "Oehmichens marionette theatre". These box lids have long since become the official trade mark of the Puppenkiste. Every single film or theatre-production starts with a small sequence of the top covers being opened. In the actual theatre, the stage is covered by two enormous box lids (0,90x 2 metres). For the TV productions, special cover flaps were produced: they are smaller and modeled to fit the screen format with the aspect ratio 4:3. These very box tops were used mostly unchanged since the end of the 1950s in almost all TV productions of the Puppenkiste. For the production of "Der Raub der Mitternachtssonne" (The theft of the midnight sun) (1994), a so-called "Insertkasten" (insert box) was designed to fit the screen aspect ratio of 16:9, which is respectively longer than the usual 4:3 format.

Only the programs done entirely by the Puppenkiste, or those that were supposed to stand out from regular productions of the Hessischer Rundfunk (Hessian broadcasting), would do without the famous box tops with their high recognition value. Worth mentioning are the numerous episodes for the German kids' program Sandmännchen (little sandman) (1962–1982), 'Die Museumsratten' (the museum rats) (1965–1972), 'Ich wünsch' mir was' (I'm wishing for something) (1968–1971), 'Wir Schildbürger' (1972), 'Natur und Technik' (nature and technology) (1972–1976) and Ralphi (2004–2006).

== Theater ==
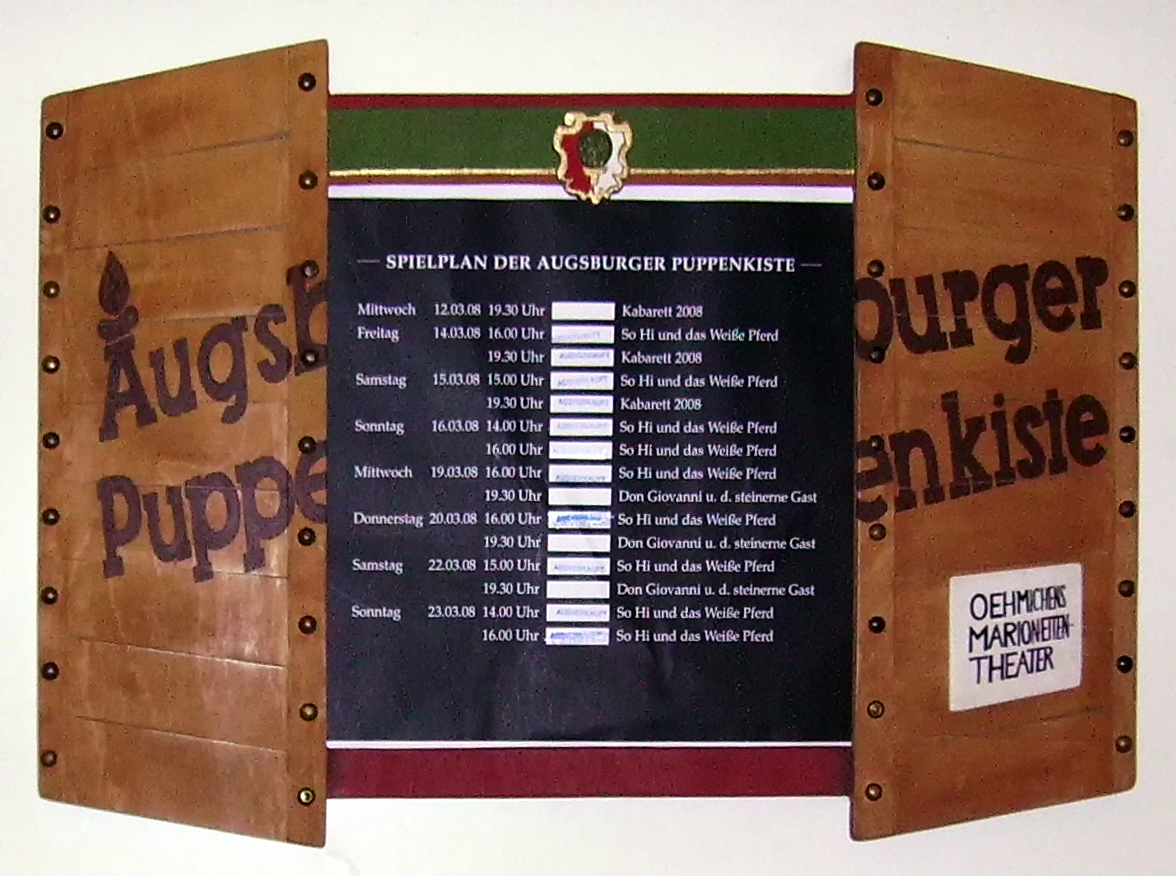
Repertoire box

=== Plays for children ===
Many classical fairy tales are played in the Puppenkiste, not only from the Brothers Grimm but also tales from One thousand and One Nights or Wilhelm Hauff. For decades, plays like Aladdin and his Wonderful Lamp, Little Longnose or Mother Hulda are performed, often new adaptions/ productions are staged. The most popular plays The Robber Hotzenplotz (1966) or The Little Witch (1971) – both created by Otfried Preußler – are put on stage unchanged since their first production.

=== Plays/shows for adults ===
The Puppenkiste also showed and is still showing many adaptations for adults. Öhmichen staged many plays which he initially was not able to put on stage, like A Dream Play, in the city theater of Augsburg, where he used to work as a director. While the small puppetry had to struggle hard with its first publications, it made its significant breakthrough with the staging of Antoine de Saint-Exupèry's The Little Prince on February 26, 1951. Walter Öhmichen himself slipped into the role of the narrating pilot.

The premiere of Berthold Brecht's The Threepenny Opera in the Puppenkiste in Augsburg on September 25, 1960, was spectacular. Again Öhmichen himself was performing, this time as a balladeer. The poet of the play died four years ago in Cold War times in the GDR and was a rather infamous citizen. Also, Der Prozess um des Esels Schatten (The trial over the donkey's shadow) from 1962 by Friedrich Dürrenmatt again and again appears in the program.

But the Puppenkiste does not only stage serious and funny plays and classics such as Dr. Johann Georg Faust; operas and other musical works, preferably from Mozart, are performed, too. Already in 1952, Walter Oehmichen directed some works, in which music features prominently. So he staged Peter and the Wolf by Sergei Prokofiev, a symphonic fairy-tale for children, as well as Bastien und Bastienne, a comic opera composed by Mozart. In 1985, the theatre staged another one of Mozart's works: The Magic Flute. The opera was adapted for marionettes by Walter Oehmichens son-in-law, Hanns-Joachim Marschall. In the course of the adaption, Marschall slightly changed the opera, cutting out long arias. He also engaged actors with trained singing voices to speak and sing the parts of the characters. Thus, every puppet had a double cast: a manipulator and a speaker. The same strategy was used for the adaption of Mozart's The Abduction from the Seraglio in 1991.

In 2005, the year preceding Mozart's 250th birthday, the opera Don Giovanni was produced by Klaus Marschall under the title Don Giovanni and the stone visitor. The part of Don Giovanni's servant was represented by a Kasperl puppet (a puppet character similar to Punch), who spiced up the opera by his wit and comic escapades.

Alongside the productions aimed at a young audience, the Augsburger Puppenkiste successfully stages several productions for adults. Every year, a pantomime show is a popular part of the repertoire. The new pantomime traditionally premieres on New Year's Eve, and is performed about a hundred times during the following six months.

== TV productions ==
As of 1953 the Augsburger Puppenkiste gained popularity throughout Germany: Only a few weeks after the premier of the Tagesschau, aired the first television programme showing the tale of Peter and the Wolf on 21 January. The show was reenacted in the Bunker of the NWDR in Hamburg and was broadcast live due to the lack of recording technology. So were the following shows which were produced by the Hessische Rundfunk in the Frankfurt television studios until 1954. Since the HR dropped its children's programme between 1956 and 1959, the Bayerische Rundfunk was another stop along the way of the Puppenkiste. However, after the relaunch HR offered the in-house writer Manfred Jenning to realize the concept of a series (Die Geschichte der Muminfamilie) and the Puppenkiste returned to its original station.

While the first TV productions of the Augsburger Puppenkiste were mere recordings of theatre productions, they soon turned into elaborate motion pictures/ movies/ (feature) films. On every day of the filming, only three to four minutes of actual film were produced. Because of the spot lights, the temperature in the temporary studio went up to around 60 °C, and so the job/ filming literally brought the sweat to the brows of the manipulators. From then on/ because of that, the filming took no longer place in the temporary studio (anyone knows if that was still the bunker?/ dugout?), but in the lobby/ foyer of the Augsburger Puppenkiste theatre. Manfred Henning did not only write the scripts for the films, but also worked as/ functioned as (the) director. It was under his direction, that the recorded theatre productions turned into films, which tapped the full potential of 1960s film production/ the 1960s filmmaking/ filmmaking at the time. The TV series soon became independent projects and were thus separated from the theatre productions. This is the reason why the famous TV stars were never actually seen on stage in Augsburg.

=== The classics ===
Many of early productions are today ranked among the classics. One of them is the first-ever film series of the Puppenkiste, which was produced in 1959. The Moomin Family (after the Books of Tove Jansson) consisted of six sequels, which were broadcast during the 1959 Christmas season. The first series was soon followed by a second one, Summer in Moominvalley, produced in 1960. Two series of "Jim Button and Luke the Engine Driver" (Jim Knopf und Lukas der Lokomotivführer) were filmed and released in 1961 and 1962 respectively. The early films were filmed in black and white, but the success of the Jim Button series led to a remake in 1976 filmed in colour.

Other early productions of the Puppenkiste were "The little fat Knight" (Der kleine dicke Ritter, 1963), an adaptation of Robert Bolt's play The Thwarting of Baron Bolligrew, "Splashy the Squid" (1963), by whose careless behaviour nearly everything was destroyed, and "The Tomcat Mikesch" (1964, based on a book by Josef Lada). The Puppenkiste was produced by Hessian television broadcaster Hessischer Rundfunk from 1954 until a dispute over the rights to DVD licensing ended the relationship after 40 years. Between 1956 and 1958, the Puppenkiste worked with the Bavarian television broadcaster Bayerischer Rundfunk. The Puppenkiste has been in colour since 1965. One of the best known and most popular productions of this period was probably "Impy's Island" (Urmel aus dem Eis) from 1969. Audiences have also loved the "Lion trilogy" (1965–1967), "The Robber Hotzenplotz" (1967), and "Bill Bo" (1968). Max Kruse became one of the authors whose works were most often made into films. He provided the source material for "The Lion is on the loose", "The Lion comes flying" and "Well roared, Lion", as well as for another Impy film, "Impy is playing in the castle" (1974). He also provided the source material for "Don Tin", "The Golden Squire" (1973), and the Wild West adventure "Lord Battershirt" (1978).

=== The 1980s/90s ===
Sepp Strubel succeeded Jenning as the TV producer of the Augsburger Puppenkiste. Since the early 1960s Strubel had already worked as a narrator for the Puppenkiste. With the shows "Nature and Technology" and "Think and Thought" (1972–1976), he had also created and realised his own scientific magazine series for children in which the Puppenkiste puppets featured. Instead of employing well-known authors that had already provided the Puppenkiste with successes, Strubel hired young authors for the television adaptations:In 1980, the "Opodeldkoks" was made after a novel by Paul Maar, and in 1982, The Cat with the Hat was filmed. The universe became a new destination for Strubel: First he went to the Apfelstern ("apple star") (Fünf auf dem Apfelstern ("five on the apple star"), 1981) and in 1986/87, the little robot Schlupp came from the green star to the Earth (script: Ellis Kaut).

On April 16, 1983, a scheduled performance had to be aborted after its beginning because in the TV show Wetten dass...?, which was just taking place in Augsburg, a bet had been made that a performance of the puppets on short notice was not possible. Some of the puppeteers took some of the most famous puppets to the show, which was broadcast on the channel ZDF, so that they unexpectedly appeared on television on that day. In 1994 another TV production was realised in cooperation with the "Hessischer Rundfunk" – the last cooperation for the time being: Strubel did no longer function as director for "The Robbing of the Midnight Sun". He only wrote the screenplay- just like he did for "Lülü the Castle Ghost" (1992) and "Schmollo the Wizard" (1993).

In 1997, a film based on the novel A Rat's Tale by the American children's book author Tor Seidler brought the Augsburger Puppenkiste to the big screen. About 900,000 cinema goers watched (rat-) puppets and humans interacting in New York's harbour and gangland areas. The film, directed by Michael F. Huse, was awarded the Bavarian Film Award in the category best children's movie.

=== Since the year 2000 ===
In 2000/01 a new TV series was produced: Lilalu im Schepperland (a total of thirteen episodes) relates the adventures the princess of the fairy tale singing country Melodania, the court kitchen gnome Pimpernell and the crow Lukulla have to face while fighting the mighty witch Synkopia, the Red Goblin and other witches and wizards. The script to the series, which is based on Enid Blyton's "Book of Brownies", was written by Peter Scheerbaum, the in-staff writer of the Augsburger Puppenkiste. He was already (involved in) working on the script of "The Story of Monty Spinnerratz".

The latest television project of the Puppenkiste is "Ralphi", which was first realized in 2005/2006. Ralphi is a bear puppet, who is going on journeys into the real world to explore new things. The program Ralphi runs on the kids channel of the Bavarian television broadcast (Bayrischer Rundfunk, BR). Every time, he sets out from the Augsburger Puppenkiste and travels all over Bavaria investigating how businesses work and explaining it to children. For the Christmas time, he explores the tradition of gifts and Christmas cribs and visits a factory which produces firework rockets.

The Puppenkiste also produces documentaries, which are aimed (both) at children and adults. The documentary "Augusta Kasperlicorum", which was produced in 2004, Kasperl/ Punch presents his home city, Augsburg to the audience. During the Mozart year in 2006, "Augusta Mozarteum" was filmed. In this documentary Kasperl finds out things about the famous composer, whose father was born in Augsburg – just like Kasperl/ Punch. Both documentaries were, however, only released on DVD.

The Puppenkiste went back to its roots by producing a film version of the cabaret/ pantomime show. On New Year's Eve 2005, a "best of" version of the current pantomime show was filmed on the stage of the Augsburger Puppenkiste theatre. From April 2006 on, different songs from the cabaret are presented as a musical interlude on the TV channel BR-alpha under the title of "poetics of amazement".

== The Puppenkiste on tour ==
For their fiftieth anniversary, the Augsburger Puppenkiste toured Germany for two years and was sponsored by the book sales club "Club Bertelsmann".

Since 2003 the puppet theatre has toured through German paediatric clinics, performing "The little kangaroo and the scaredy-hare" in hopes of encouraging sick children. From April 29 to May 7, 2006 the play was also performed three times a day by the Puppenkiste in Augsburg's twin city Amagasaki in Japan.

In 2006 another tour was launched that was aimed specifically at kindergartens. By watching Peter Schneerbaum's play "Paula and the elfs from the box" children are supposed to learn how to deal with their emotions. In the context of project "Papilio" of the Beta-Institute the play was created using scientific knowledge. The Papilio tour started at the Bayerischer Landtag in Munich March 7, 2006.

== Relocation of the stage / Puppentheater museum ==
As part of the renovation of the Heilig-Geist-Spital, the whole stage was moved to a different part of the house (from the left to the right, seen from the entrance).

Since 6 October 2001, the Puppenkiste has a museum, located on the first floor of the Heilig-Geist-Spital building, directly above the theater halls. This had been a long-time dream of Hannelore Marschall-Oehmichen. The most famous marionettes like Urmel, Jim Knopf and Kalle Wirsch can be seen in a permanent exhibition. Special exhibitions often dedicated to specific topics show other puppets from the house's own collection as well as from other theaters. These temporary exhibitions change every four months.

== Music ==
With a dance remix of the song "Eine Insel mit zwei Bergen" (EN: An island with two mountains) from the soundtrack of the film version of "Jim Knopf und Lukas der Lokomotivführer", the band Dolls United reached nationwide success in the music charts in German-speaking countries. In 1996, the single received the German platinum record award for more than 500,000 copies sold.

== Selected children's books ==
Many characters and stories of the Augsburger Puppenkiste have been featured in children's books:

- Ulf Brönner (Ed.): Augsburger Puppenkiste. Brönner Bildergeschichten. Brönner, Frankfurt am Main
  - 1. Bill Bo und seine Kumpane, 1972
  - 2. Kleiner König Kalle Wirsch, 1972
  - 3. Urmel aus dem Eis, 1973
  - 4. 3:0 für die Bärte, 1973
  - 5. Wir Schildbürger, 1973
- Michael Ende: Jim Knopf und Lukas der Lokomotivführer. Emma geht auf Reisen. Delphin, Stuttgart 1972, ISBN 3-7735-2214-2
- Peter Garski: Panik in der Puppenkiste – Ein Augsburg-Krimi. SOSO-Verlag, Augsburg 2006, ISBN 3-923914-12-1
- Manfred Jenning: Das Fernsehsandmännchen erzählt. Kunibert und Heiner, Pieperle, Beppo und Peppi. Spectrum, Essen 1976, ISBN 3-7976-1259-1
- Josef Lada: Kater Mikesch auf der Kirchweih. Delphin, Munich 1990, ISBN 3-7735-2216-9
- Werner Morgenrath: Die Story von Monty Spinnerratz. Das Buch zum Film. Franz Schneider, Munich 1997, ISBN 3-505-10635-6
- Harald Schäfer: Die Museumsratten. Eine vergnüglich belehrende Reise mit Marionetten der Augsburger Puppenkiste durch das Ledermuseum in Offenbach, das Verkehrsmuseum in Nürnberg, das Wilhelm-Busch-Museum in Hannover, das Münchhausen-Museum in Bodenwerder und das Till-Eulenspiegel-Museum in Schöppenstedt. R. G. Fischer, Frankfurt am Main 1996, ISBN 3-89501-376-5
- Peter Scheerbaum: Paula und die Kistenkobolde. Eine Vorlesegeschichte über Gefühle. Beta-Institutsverlag, Augsburg 2005, ISBN 3-934942-09-1
- Peter Scheerbaum, Nicola Kächele: Lilalu im Schepperland. Das Buch zum Film. Wissner, Augsburg 2000, ISBN 3-89639-213-1

== Bibliography ==
- Christa B. Geis (Hrsg.): 40 Jahre Augsburger Puppenkiste. Das Farbjournal zum Jubiläum. Vindelica, Augsburg 1988
- Holger Jenrich: Von Titiwu bis Lummerland. 50 Jahre Augsburger Puppenkiste. Klartext, Essen 1998, ISBN 3-88474-551-4
- Hanns-Joachim Marschall, Willy Schweinberger: Stars an Fäden. Das große Farbbuch über die weltberühmte Augsburger Puppenkiste. AWO-Werbung, Augsburg 1985
- Ulrike Schabert: Die Jubiläumstournee der Augsburger Puppenkiste. Bertelsmann-Club, Rheda-Wiedenbrück 1998
- Augsburger Puppenkiste (Hrsg.): 50 Jahre Augsburger Puppenkiste. Rütten & Loening, Berlin 1998, ISBN 3-352-00699-7
- Deutsches Institut für Puppenspiel (Ed.): Die Augsburger Puppenkiste im Fernsehen. Deutsches Institut für Puppenspiel, Bochum, Germany 1967
