= Adalbert Klingler =

Swiss puppeteer

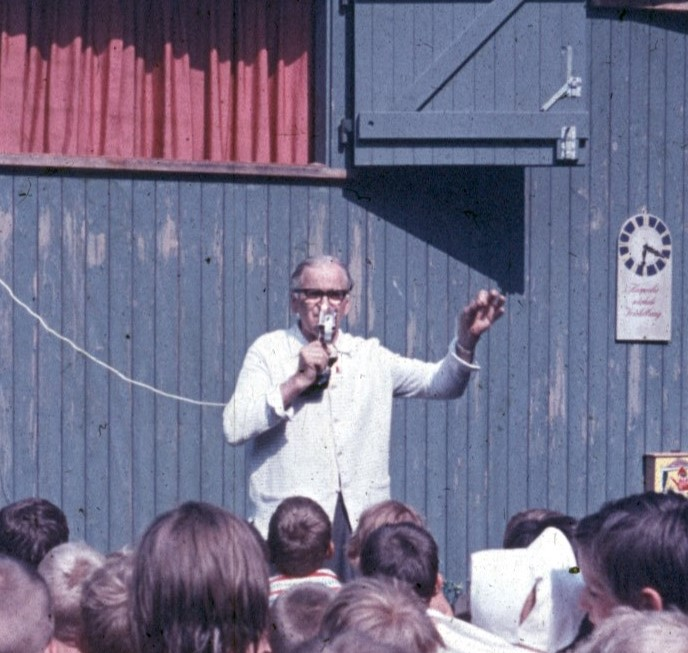
Adalbert Klingler in front of his Kasperlitheater in the Park im Grüne

Adalbert Klingler (born December 28, 1896, in Zürich-Riesbach; died November 28, 1974, in Zürich-Oerlikon) was a pioneer of artistic hand puppetry in Switzerland, father of the Migros Kasperli in Park im Grüene, and author of his Kasperli pieces and various poems in Swiss German Dialect (Zurich Switzerland).

== Beginnings in puppetry ==
In 1901, as a five-year-old boy, he came into contact with puppetry for the first time. He later said: "At that time in the Trattoria Viola on Langstrasse, where the Burattinaio, the Italian puppeteer had set up his small stage, I became literally bewitched with his Bergamasco native, a Kasper Giuppin. He blew up my world. A completely new world opened up to me." Whenever little Adalbert was able to escape from home, he took his place there. Sometimes, his mother almost had to force him out of the smoke-filled bar at ten o'clock in the evening.

In his free time, he worked as an amateur actor, e.g. at the Freie Bühne Zurich. Thanks to his expressive voice, he was chosen as a role actor at the Swiss Marionette Theater in the Museum of Design, Zürich. There he gave his voice to the monkey "Jaffo" in the play Zirkus Juhu by Traugott Vogel. He also worked as a speaker and reciter at the Radio Studio Zurich. A highlight was his appointment to participate in the Einsiedeln World Theater in 1924 and 1925.

== First engagements ==
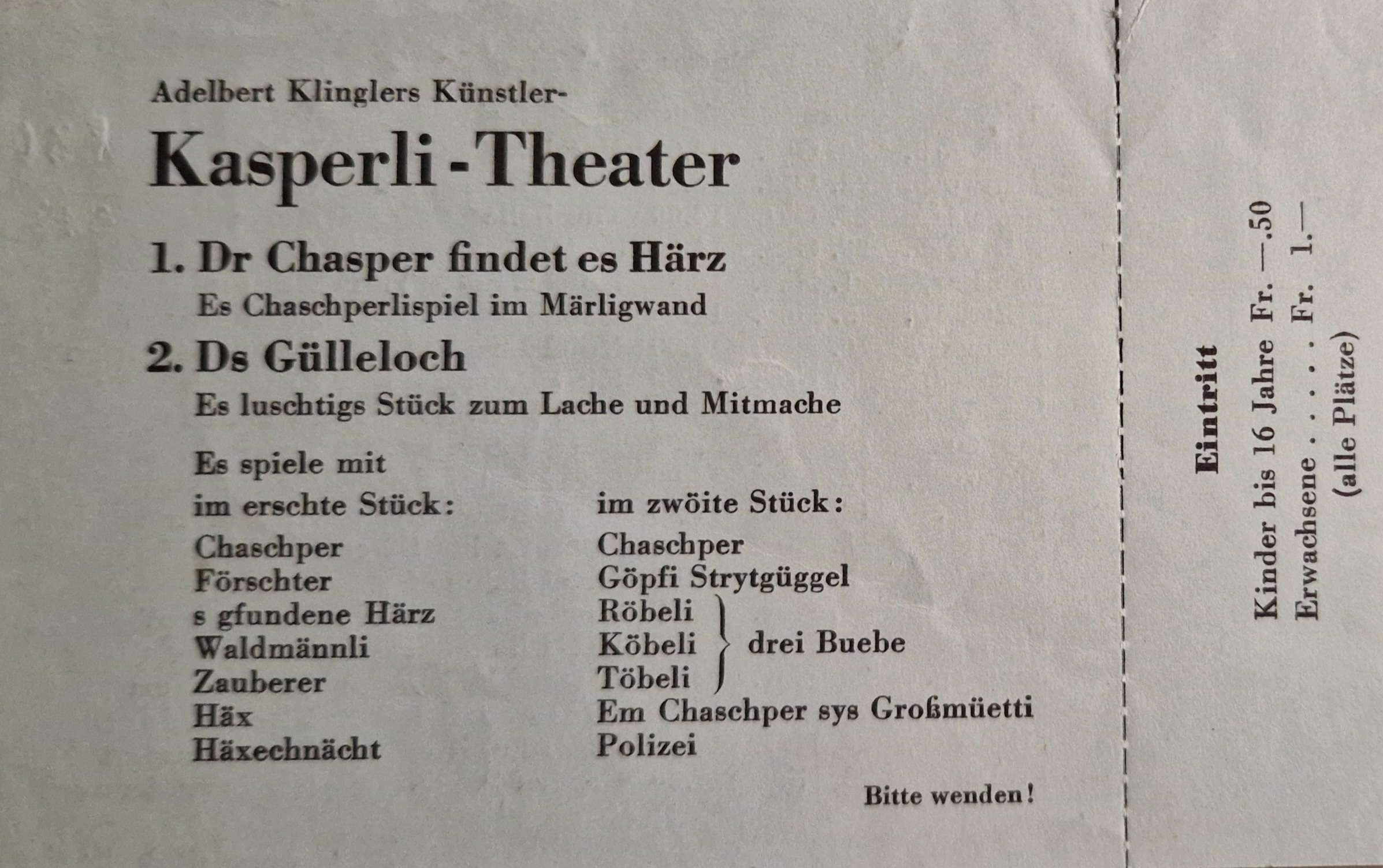
Entrance ticket for Adalbert Klingler's Kasperli Theater

In 1933 at the Züga, the Zurich horticultural exhibition, Klingler appeared in front of the public for the first time with Adalbert Klingler's Artist Kasperlitheater. In 1938, the Gantenbein & Co company in Chur organized Kasperli puppet shows from December 11 to 18. During this time, Adalbert Klingler and his wife left their four small children in the care of grandparents and friends in order to be able to accept this commitment. In 1939, Klingler received an engagement in Nestlé's children's paradise at the Swiss national exhibition "Landi 39" in Zurich. Over the course of six months, more than 70,000 children attended the Landi Kasper performances in 550 performances.

From 1939 to 1945, Klingler visited the troops as a puppeteer as part of the Spiritual national defense on behalf of the Federal Military Department's "Army and Hom" section together with the author Traugott Vogel with the newly-founded traveling theater Schnabelweid. With their HD Hansjoggel (HD = relief service) they brought variety, humor and joy to the soldiers' hard days of service.

== Main job puppeteer ==
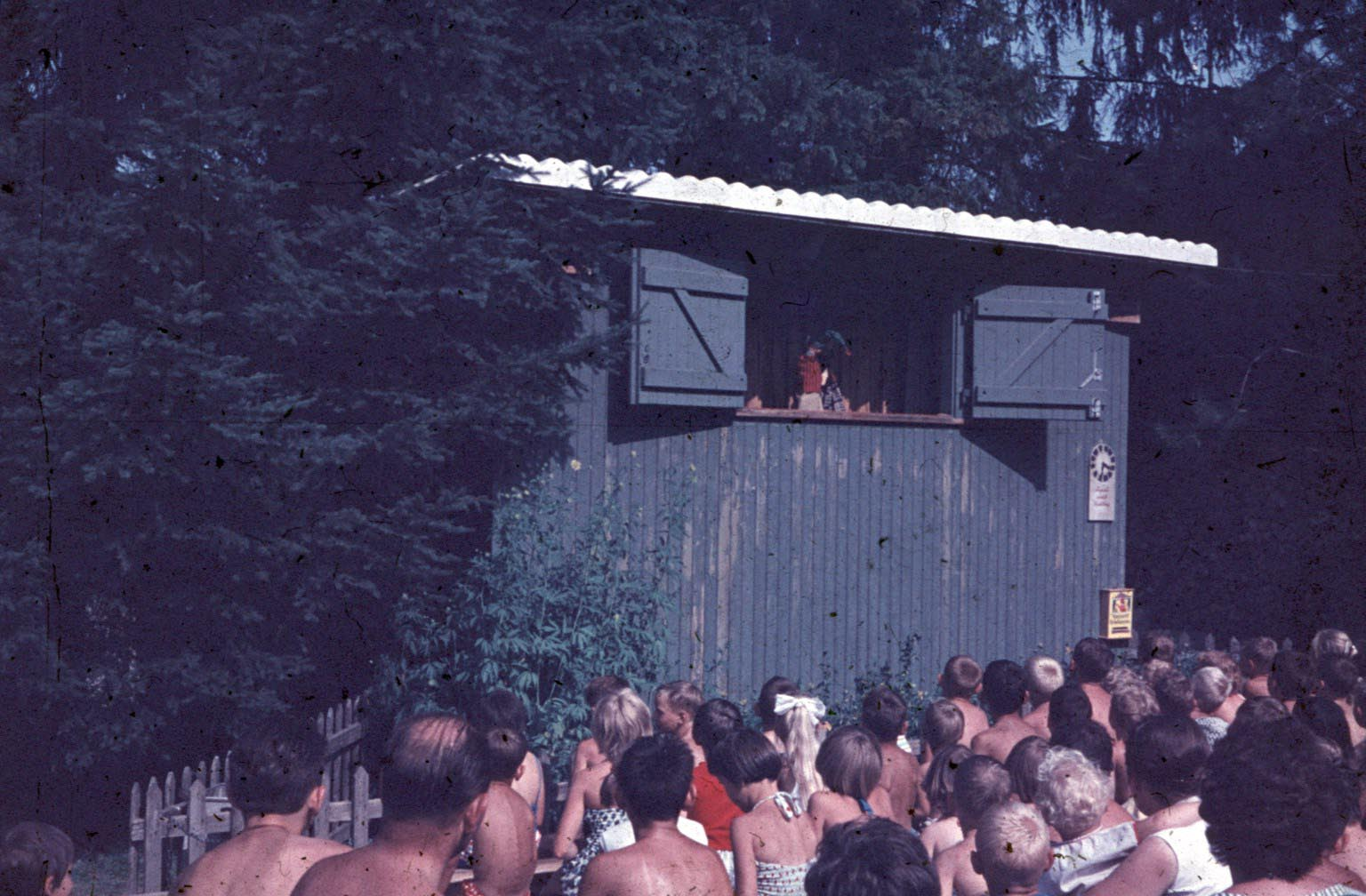
Adalbert Klingler's Punch and Judy theater in the Park im Grüene

In 1946, Gottlieb Duttweiler, the founder of the Migros Cooperative Association, hired him at Park im Grüene in Rüschlikon. Adalbert Klingler became the first puppeteer in Switzerland to hold a permanent position. From then on, he gave performances in the park in the summer, and in the winter, he toured throughout German-speaking Switzerland. Under the name "Adalbert Klingler's Artist Kasperli" he appeared as a solo player, assisted by his wife Hilde Klingler-Endres and later also by his eldest daughter Irmgard Spörri-Klingler, who also served as his helper and chauffeur.

In 1964, Adalbert Klingler had to stop playing at Park im Grüene after several cataract operations and constant throat irritation. He left his figures and Punch and Judy pieces in the park and they live on there to this day. His successor was Jörg Scheider, who brought Kasperli into Swiss children's rooms in the following years through his cassette recordings. In the following years until his death in 1974, Adalbert Klingler worked intensively as a writer. He revised Kasperli plays, wrote poems in the Zurich dialect and published many of his plays in various publishers.

== Significance as an artist ==
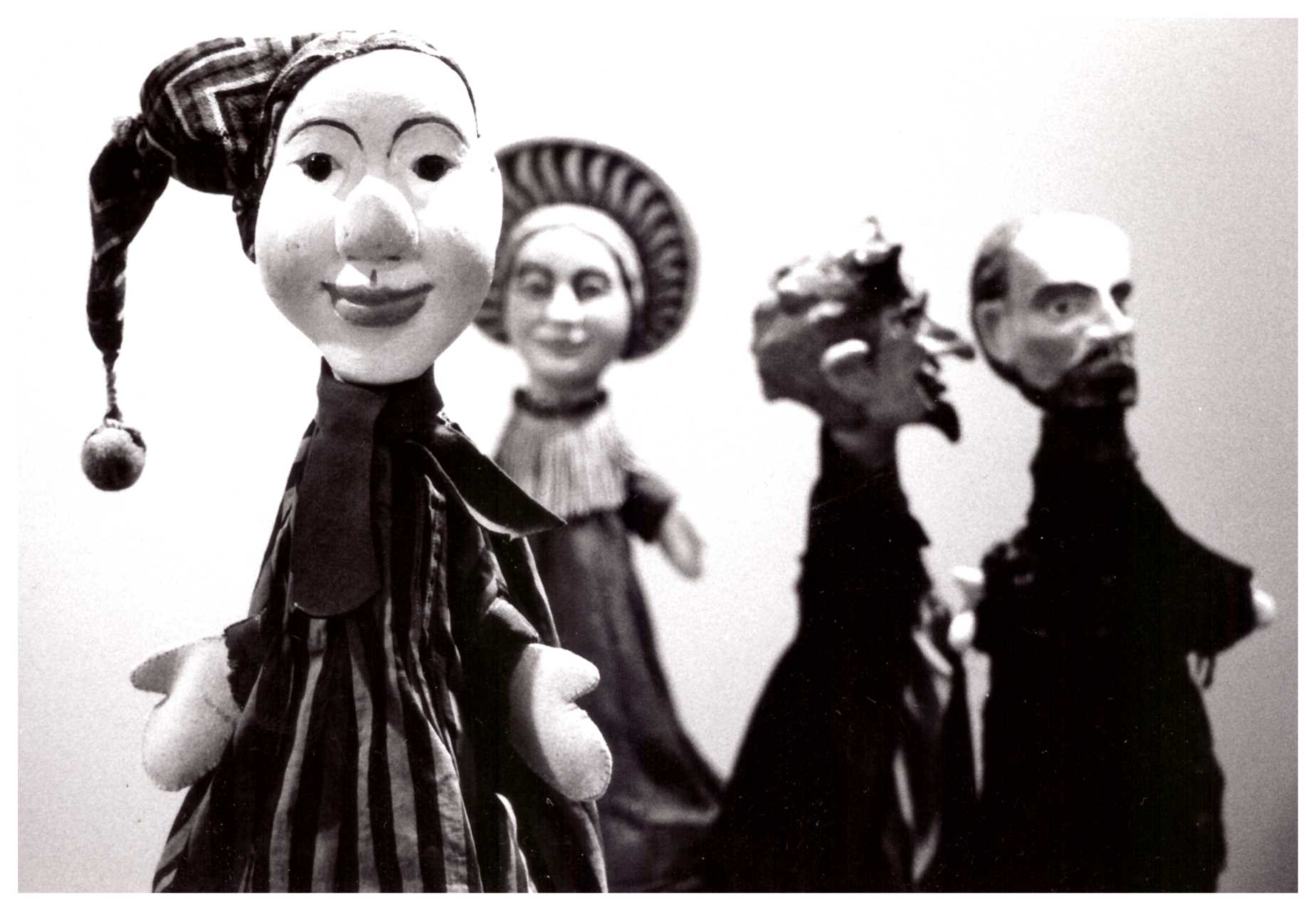
Kasper and other artist figures

Adalbert Klingler is the author of around 100 Punch and Judy plays in true Zurich dialect. Around 25 of them were published in print by SJW, Castel, Globi and Haupt-Verlag as well as self-published. At the beginning, Klingler played to foreign texts, many of which were of German origin. He later began to write his own texts for hand puppet shows, most of them in the Zurich dialect. His successors continue to perform his pieces in the Park im Grüene to this day. He also wrote poems in dialect.

Adalbert Klingler could be described as the father of Swiss hand puppetry.

== Klingler's Artist Kasper ==
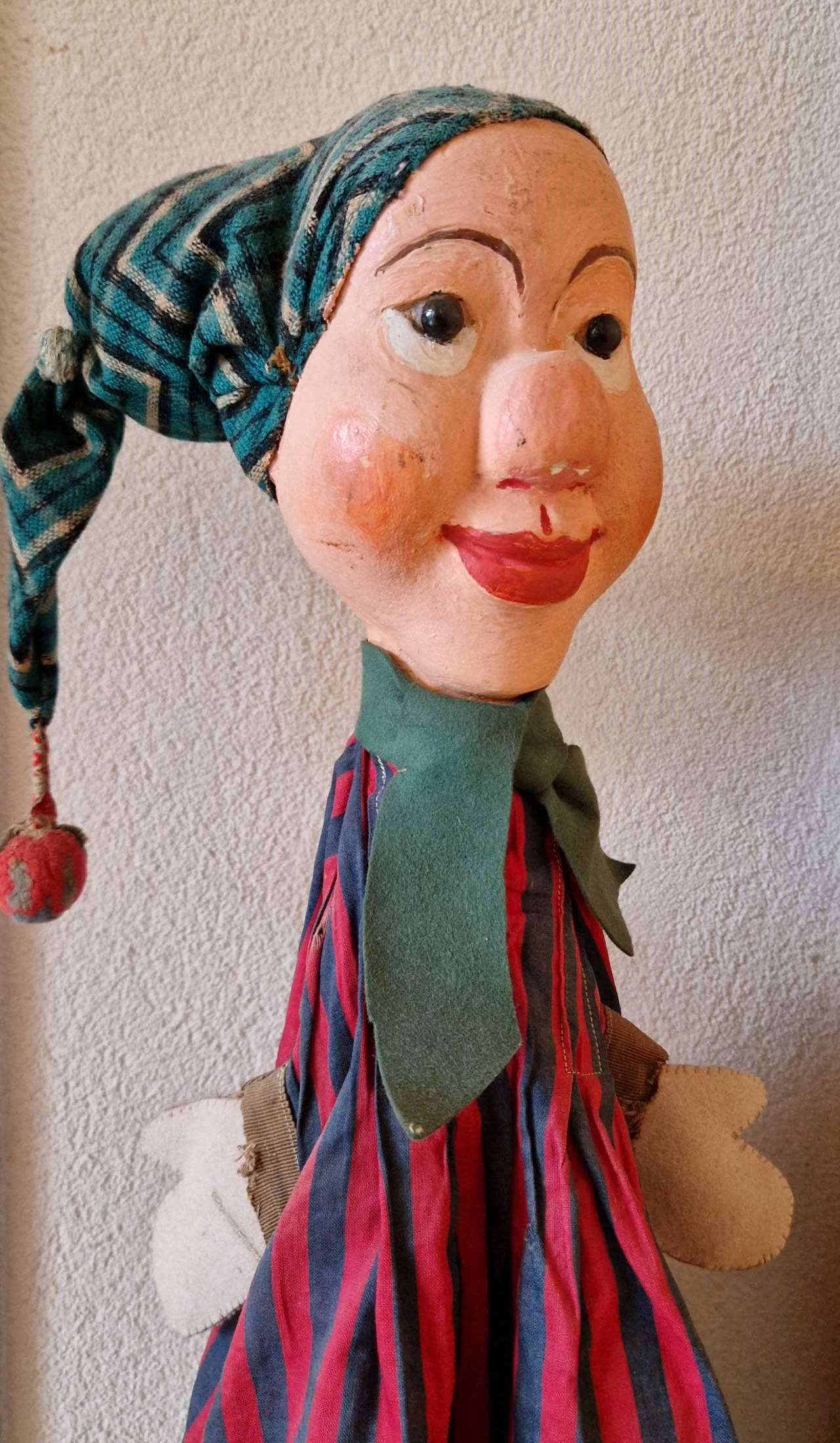
The Kasper character, created by Carl Fischer

In 1975, the puppeteer Ueli Balmer paid tribute to his predecessor as the innovator of the character of Kasper: "Adalbert Klingler's puppet show was groundbreaking for educational artistic puppetry in this country." In contrast to Max Jacob's Hohnsteiner Kasper, who was known in Germany and Austria at the time, with his hooked nose and broad laughing mouth, Klingler's Swiss counterpart has more of the traits of a sincere and clever boy. The development into Klingler-Kasper in its current form took time. His first Kasper still clearly bore the features of his German colleague. Klingler's new Kasper figure with the bulbous nose was carved in 1928 by Carl Fischer (1888–1987), the same man who commissioned Alfred Altherr to create the Hansjoggel for the production of Dr. Faust of the Swiss Marionette Theater. Klingler's Kasper is a local character. He embodies the fresh, the «gift of the gab»- type of character, the so-called «Zürihegel».

== Work ==
=== Chasperli pieces ===
With a few exceptions, the pieces are preserved as typescripts in the estate. This is with his granddaughter Regula Klingler.

1942

- S Chrippeschpiil.
- Blütenfein und Kuluruwunschifex.
- Em Chaschper sys Gärtli. (new version March 1968)

1943

- Em Chaschper sy Müli. (1943/1961)
- De Goldschatz im Fröscheweier. (1943, revision: June/July 1968)

1944

- Das Bananenkrokodil.

1945

- De guet Gäischt oder es gschpängschteret im Doorf.
- E luschtigi Gsangsschtund.

1948

- D Sune schynt für ali Lüüt. (2nd revision 1968)
- S verhäxte Hündli. (1st draft 1948, 3rd version 1968)
- Kasper, Hex und Tausendschön.
- De Chaschper, s Hüendli und de Ooschterhaas. (4th revision 1967)
- Alles wägere Chaz.
- De Nachthöiel. (new version March 1969)
- D Prinzässi Tüpfi und ihres sydig Naselümpli. (the present version of 1968 ist the result of four thorough revisions over a period of 20 years. These revisions mainly concerned linguistic improvements.)
- Em Chaschper si Himelsräis. (1st draft 1948, written 1967)

1949

- De verloore Himelsschlüssel.
- Ilgewiiss und Roseroot.
- Füürioo.
- S Güliloch. (new version 1969)
- Die schlau (gschyd) Puuretochter.

1950

- Des Teufels drei goldene Haare.
- Alles wäg ere Chatz. (1st draft 1950, final version 1968)

1951

- Sunegold und de König Yszapfä. (3rd revision 1967)
- De Chaschper und di drüü Seck Määl / Die verschwundenen Mehlsäcke.
- Faust. (incomplete draft)
- Am Fluss / Im Chaschper sym Garte.
- D Schläckhäx. (new version 1968)
- Rumperlstilzli.
- D Glückschroon.
- Die beede Röiber Luchs und Fuchs.
- Chaschper, Tazelwurm und Glögglispiil.

1952

- D Robinsoonhütte. (1952, 1960, 1968)
- Der aarm Gumperli. (completely revised 1968)
- S gfunde Häärz. (5th revision 1968)

1953

- Die beiden Glocken.
- Dä böös Nachber.
- Bim Waldweier im Tannäbüel.
- Nu es chlyses Liechtli.
- D Zauberlaterne.
- S Läbeswasser.

1954

- Der Öpfelschtand.

1956

- Lupf mi uuf, cheer mi um. (3rd revision 1956)

1957

- De König Trooschtlebaart. (3rd revision 1968)
- Em Chröömer syn Chorb.
- Die beede Glogge.

1958

- Guutschäross und Achergaul. (1st draft 1958, completely new version 1967)
- Silberhäärz und Goldhäärz.

1959

- Der Menschen und der Tiere Dank.
- Dä Charfunkelschtäi.

1960

- Wie de Chaschper König wiirt .(revised 1969)

1961

- De Fischer und sy Frau.
- S Sunegold.

1967

- Em Riis syn Taappe und de Plämpel vo de Zauberglogge.

1968

- De Zauberschpruch im Bergchrischtal. (4th revision 1968)
- Hookus – pookus – Zauberstäcke. (revised October 1968)
- D Schläckhäx. (new version may/June 1968)
- De armi Gumperli. (1952, completely revised and expanded 1968)
- D Häxebluem. (new version 1968)
- De Froschkönig. (3rd completely new version)

1969

- De Chaschper, s Beetli und e Chue. (2nd revision 1968/69)

Undatierte Stücke

- Das arme gefangene Rotkehlchen.
- De Chaschper hät halt es guets Heerz.
- Em Mäieli sin Geburtstag (Es Chaschperstuck nach ere Idee vo de Claire Moser-Pilni).
- Die blaue Seerose.
- De Zirkus Ach und Krach.
- Prinz Goldlagg.
- Die Zauberuhr.
- Kaspers gute Tat.
- Schnupfsack, Chnaschterchruut und Taneböim.
- D Wunderwienecht im Märliwald.
- S Hansli und s Griitli.
- Faust.
- Kasperl als Lehrbub.
- Pass uuf, heb Sorg.
- De Häxebaum.
- Vom Chaschper und em heilige Chrischt.
- D Luussalbi.
- Globi wird Kasperle Direktor.
- Ys-Gräm.
- Kasper in der Schule.
- Dr Chaschper schpillt Chaschperli.

Unvollendete Stücke

- Lieböigli.
- De Vogel mit em goldige Herz.

Plays by Adalbert Klingler, that are still played in the Park im Grüene at Rüschlikon

- Wambambo.
- D'Schnapshäx.
- S'verlorene Chrönli.
- Profässer Übergschiid.
- De verzaubereti Prinz.

=== Published works ===
- Globi’s lustige Kasperli-Bücher. Band I: Globi wird Kasperli-Direktor / E gspässigi Grichtsverhandlig / Ein lustiges Spiel vom Kaster am Nil / Schnuderzapfe, Zigerchrapfe und de Tod / Praktische Anleitung zum selber Kasperli spielen. Illustriert von Herbert Leupin. Globi-Verlag, Zürich 1943/1944.
- Globi’s lustige Kasperli-Bücher. Band II: Dä Globi weiss en Raat / Isepaan Lokematiif / Wänn de Chaschper d Chindli gschweiget / e luschtigi Gsangs-Schtund / Ibitumm-Zältli / Praktische Anleitung zum Selbstbau eines Bühnenhauses. Illustrated by Herbert Leupin. Globi-Verlag, Zürich 1945.
- Chaschper, Chrischt und Königssoon: Drei Handpuppenspiele auch für grosse Leute. Verlag Paul Haupt, Bern 1959.
- De Chaschper schlüüfft is Määrli-Gwand. Vier zürichdeutsche Kasperstücke. Verlag Paul Haupt, Bern 1967.
- Em Chaschper sis Gärtli; ein fröhliches Spiel für das Handpuppentheater. With linocuts by Klara Fehrlin. Schweizerisches Jugendschriftenwerk, Zürich 143. (= SJW Nr. 152)
- De verloore Himmelsschlüssel: Es Chaschperlispiil vom Adalbert Klingler mit Zäichnige vo der Klara Fehrlin. Schweizerisches Jugendschriftenwerk, Zürich 1949. (= SJW Nr. 333)
- Prinz Goldlagg. Castel Verlag, Wollerau/SZ 1963.
- Em Chröömer syn Chorb. Volksverlag, Elgg.
- S Läbeswasser. Es Chaschperlispiil im Mëërli-Gwand nach de Brüeder Grimm. Eigenverlag Gnosseschaft zur Limet, Zürich 1953.
- Der gute Wichtelmann; nach Motiven aus dem finnischen Märchen «der Hausgeist». Für die Kasperlibühne frei gestaltet und mit Zeichnungen von Adalbert Klingler. Self-published Genossenschaft zur Limmat, Zürich.
- Zauberer, Hex und Tausendschön. Self-published Genossenschaft zur Limmat, Zürich.
- Rumpelstilzli: Es Chaschperlispiil nach em Mëërli vo de Brüedere Grimm, ersunen und zämäpüschelet und mit Helglenen uusstaffiert vom Adalbert Klingler. Self-published Genossenschaft zur Limmat, Zürich.

== Literature ==
- Oskar Eberle: Wege zum Volkstheater. In: Jahrbuch der Gesellschaft für Schweizerische Theaterkultur, Bd. 13, 1943, S. 33–37. Webzugriff via E-Periodica
- Ursula Bissegger: Puppentheater in der Schweiz. In: Schweizerische Gesellschaft für Theaterkultur (Hrsg.): Schweizer Theaterjahrbuch, Bd. 41, 1978. Webzugriff via E-Periodica
- Theo und Mariann Landolt: Abschied. In: Figura. Zeitschrift für Puppen- und Figurentheater, Jg. 24, Nr. 76, Heft 2. S. 11.
- Beat Matter: De Chasperli isch da. In: Migros-Magazin, Nr. 2, 9. Januar 2012, S. 10–17. Link
- Balmer-Krüger, Ueli: Eintritt frei – Kinder die Hälfte. Von Puppenspielern, Gauklern und Komödianten in Europa. Books on Demand, 2013.
- Elke Krafka: Aussenansicht Schweiz: Figurentheater. ZeitSpuren, Brunn am Gebirge 2023.
- Regula Klingler: Adalbert Klingler. Ein Leben für den Kasperli. Friedrich Reinhardt Verlag, Basel 2025
