= Lilalu im Schepperland =

- Country of origin: Germany

Lilalu im Schepperland is a 13-part German television series from the Augsburger Puppenkiste. The first season was broadcast in 2000, and the second in 2001. It is loosely based on Enid Blyton's Book of Brownies.
