= Hotzenplotz =

Hotzenplotz may refer to:

- Hotzenplotz - German name of Osoblaha / Osobłoga river in Czech Republic and in Poland
- Hotzenplotz - German name of Osoblaha village in Czech Republic
- The Robber Hotzenplotz - a children's book by German author Otfried Preußler
