= Die Muminfamilie =

- Based on: Moomin by Tove Jansson and Lars Jansson
- Country of origin: West Germany
- No. of episodes: 12

Production
- Producer: Augsburger Puppenkiste
- Production company: Hessischer Rundfunk

Original release
- Release: 16 August 1959 – 1960

Die Muminfamilie (lit. The Moomin Family) was a West German television series released from 1959 to 1960 that was based on the Moomin books by Finnish writer Tove Jansson. It was filmed in black and white and broadcast by ARD. It was notably the first television series ever to be made based on the books. It was also the first TV-series produced by Augsburger Puppenkiste. In all, 12 episodes were made.

== Episodes ==
Season 1 (Die Muminfamilie) - 1959:

1. Der geheimnisvolle Fund
2. Die Verwandlung
3. Der Urwald
4. Der Ausflug
5. Die Gäste
6. Das große Fest

Season 2 (Sturm im Mumintal) - 1960:

1. Sturm im Mumintal (sometimes seen as a different series from this point)
2. Das Theater
3. Emma
4. Der Wald
5. Die Generalprobe
6. Zu Hause

== Home release ==
The series was released as a part of a DVD box set containing other early children's television series produced in Germany by Augsburger Puppenkiste.
