= Kater Mikesch =

- Author: Josef Lada
- Publication date: 1963

Kater Mikesch (original title: Kocour Mikeš) is a children's book by the Czech author Josef Lada from the 1930s. Its retelling by German author Otfried Preußler was awarded the Deutscher Jugendliteraturpreis in 1963. In 1964, it was adapted into a German children's television series by the Augsburger Puppenkiste marionette theatre company.

== Plot ==
In the little village of Holleschitz lives a cobbler named Pepik and his grandmother. She has a cat called Mikesch. Pepik and Mikesch become friends, and Pepik teaches Mikesch to speak. Many people in Holleschitz are startled by the talking tomcat and embrace him. The cobbler makes him a pair of boots. The cutler makes him a garment, because Mikesch helped him.

Besides Mikesch, grandmother owns the dog Sultan and the pig Paschik. Mikesch teaches the pig to speak. With the local shepherd lives the fierce ram Bobesch, whom the shepherd wants to sell on the local market. Pepik saves him by teaching him to speak as well. Bobesch pledges to the shepherd that he will behave.

Paschik, Bobesch and Mikesch become good friends. One day, Mikesch smashes grandmother's cream pot. Because of a guilty conscience and fear of her reaction, he runs off and goes out into the world to search for work. He succeeds in this with the circus Klutzki. With a lot of money in his pockets, a new cream pot and lots of presents for his friends, he returns home. There he gets to know Maunzerle, who is a part of the cobbler's household and has also learned to speak, but not as well as Mikesch.

== See also ==
- List of German television series
