= Urmel from the Ice Age =

Children's novel by Max Kruse

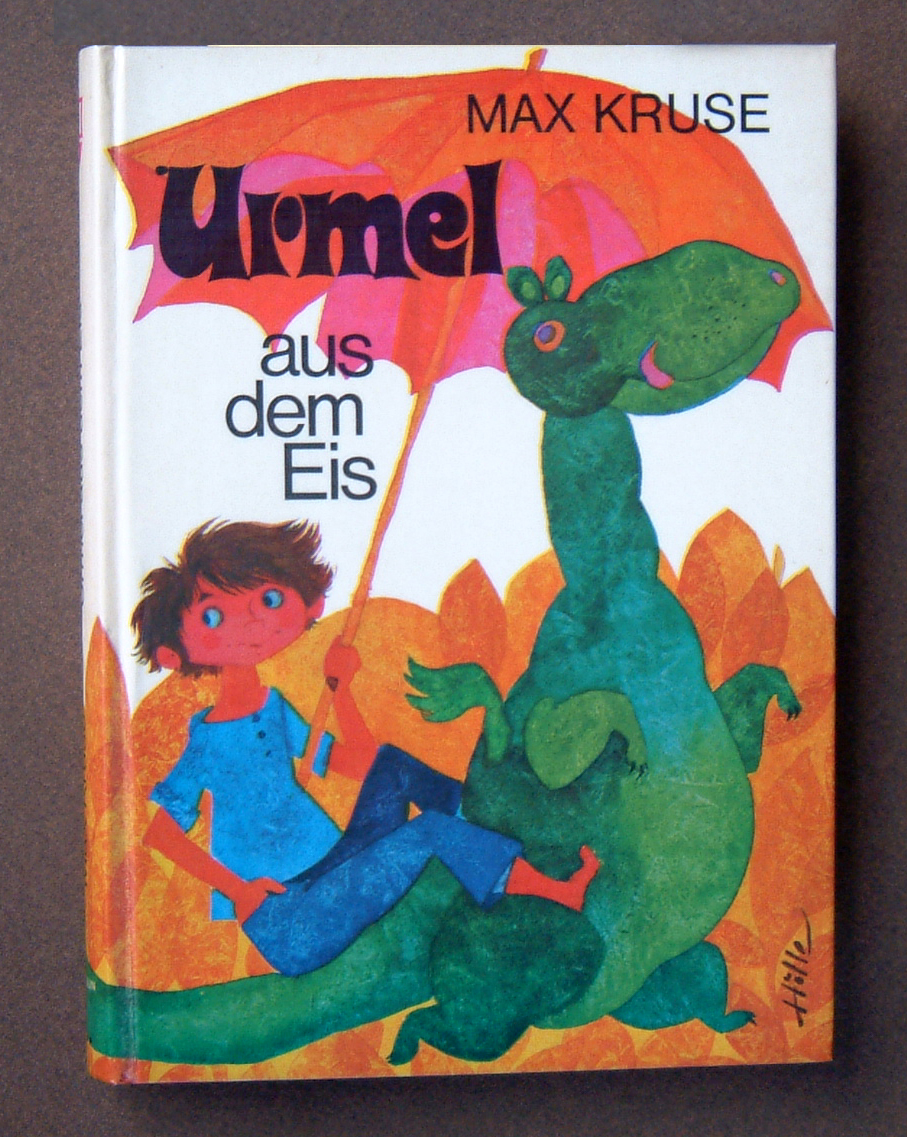
- The first edition of the first book with Urmel and Tim
- Author: Max Kruse
- Original title: Urmel aus dem Eis
- Illustrator: Enrich Hölle
- Language: German
- Series: Urmel
- Genre: Fantasy
- Publisher: Thienemann, Stuttgart
- Publication date: 1969
- Publication place: Germany
- English publication date: 1970
- Followed by: Urmel fliegt ins All

Urmel from the Ice Age (Urmel aus dem Eis) is a children's book written by German children's author Max Kruse.

== Plot ==
At the time of the dinosaurs, a mother Urmel lays an egg. A short time later, however, an Ice Age begins and the egg is covered in snow. It eventually freezes in the ice.

A long time later, the natural history professor Habakuk Tibatong develops a method of teaching animals to speak. Because of the envy and attacks of his professor colleagues, he leaves his home to settle with Tim Inkblot, a little orphan boy, and the talking domestic pig Wutz on the small island of Titiwu.

There are other animals on the island that Tibatong teaches to speak at the beginning of the story. Each of the animals is characterized through a speech error: The penguin Ping articulates the sibilant " sh" as "pf"; the Waran Wawa lisps; the elephant seal soul-Fant sings songs in which he consistently diphthongises vowels, and the shoebill Schusch says the vowel "i" as "ä"[ ɛ ].

Wutz, who can speak almost flawlessly, takes on the job of housekeeper, while the other animals on the island regularly take part in voluntary language lessons in Professor Tibatong's school. One day an iceberg washes ashore with a large egg, from which, after a short incubation period, an Urmel hatches, which is then raised by Wutz and also learns to speak. According to Tibatong's theory, the Urmel are the evolutionary link between the dinosaurs and the mammals.

In the course of his childhood, Urmel has to endure various adventures, in particular the disempowered and therefore bored King Pumponell of Pumpolonien as a big game hunter after him. The deposed monarch is also called "King Futsch" because his homeland declared itself a republic, whereupon he had to abdicate, so his kingship is " gone ". King Futsch came to the island in a helicopter with his servant Samuel, known as Sami, to take the Urmel to Museum Director Zwengelmann in Pumpolonien.

On his escape from Futsch, Wawa hides the Urmel in a cave where a large crab lives on an island in the middle of an underground lake and where nitrous oxide leaks from a source. Together with Sami, King Futsch follows the supposed traitor Wawa into the cave, where he actually wants to mislead them, but under the influence of the laughing gas the king takes the crab for Urmel and tries to kill it with his hunting rifle. Due to the noise of the gunfire, the entrance to the cave collapses, so that both Wawa and his hunters are trapped and are now in great danger.

The other islanders are alerted to the accident by an earthquake, whereupon a rescue operation can begin. All those buried are finally rescued in Wutz' "slumber barrel", which has been converted into a submarine, through an underground connection channel to the sea. The Urmel becomes friends with King Futsch, who promises not to hunt it anymore. As a farewell, Tibatong gives the king a bucket that supposedly contains the "invisible fish". Futsch is happy to have at least something to show the vain dwarf man - even if it's just a hoax. The Urmel should be kept secret so that it can grow up undisturbed on Titiwu.

== Characters ==
In addition to the two people Professor Habakuk Tibatong and Tim Inkblot, the red-haired adoptive son and a kind of assistant to the professor, various animals live on the island of Titiwu (an acronym from Ti batong, Ti ntenklecks and Wu tz ), which are primarily characterized by their ability to speak bear anthropomorphic features:

Pig is the professor's female domestic pig and lives in a barrel next to the professor's house. She is the only one of the animals that has no actual speech defect. Only now and then does she use “öff” when she (often indignant) has to catch her breath.

The Urmel is the last representative of an extinct animal species which Tibatong suspects is the link between dinosaurs and mammals. It is characterized by its way of speaking ( children's language ) as often very irresponsible and playful.

The Waran Wawa lives in the empty shell of a giant clam, which is located on the beach of Titiwu and is very jealous of his friend Ping, the penguin is why several attempts to occupy Wawas habitation. The "Mupfel" as the Penguin calls is about the Urmel novels addition to a household word become. Although all islanders get along very well, Ping and Wawa are particularly close friends.

Shush, the shoebill is in the small community Titiwus the only flyable animal and therefore often acts as a scout or messenger. Since Ping can not fly, Schusch does not see him as a real bird.

Seel-Fant usually lies on the rock in front of the island. His repertoire of sad songs testifies here of musical education - this is his song refers to förnöm place onnahbar eurön Flossön. A parody on the Grail story in Richard Wagner's opera Lohengrin.

King Pumponell: a former king who wants to hunt Urmel and add to his trophy collection.

== Adaptations ==
The book was adapted into puppet show by Augsburger Puppenkiste in 1969. Also in 1995 there was a loose animated adaption of the book with a few episodes being adaptations of the book in which Tibatong is a female named Opheila Tibatong/Tiddlypom and instead of Tibatong teaching the animals how to talk she instead uses speech drops and Pig is given a name and is called Toots. Tim does not appear in this adaptation, King Pumponell is renamed to Solmeyer/Slimeyer in the with references to him being king were being omitted where instead he is a Zookeeper and he and Zwengelmann/Swindleman dub swap roles Zwengelmann wants capture and kill Urmel and stuff him on display at his museum while Solmeyer wants keep him in a Zoo but always fail at the end. The series lasted for 26 episodes. In 2006, a film based on the book and Augsburger Puppenkiste version was released called, Impy's Island.
