= A Rat's Tale =

1997 German-American fantasy film

- German theatrical release poster
- Directed by: Michael F. Huse
- Screenplay by: Werner Morgenrath; Peter Scheerbaum
- Based on: A Rat's Tale by Tor Seidler
- Produced by: Hans-Peter Clahsen
- Starring: Beverly D'Angelo; Jerry Stiller; Josef Ostendorf; Lauren Hutton
- Cinematography: Piotr Lenar
- Edited by: Timothy McLeish
- Music by: Frédéric Talgorn
- Production companies: Monty Film; Warner Bros. Film Gmbh
- Distributed by: Warner Bros. (Germany); Legacy Releasing (United States)
- Release dates: 27 March 1997 (Germany); 20 March 1998 (United States)
- Running time: 89 minutes
- Countries: Germany; United States
- Languages: German; English
- Box office: $33,768 (US)

A Rat's Tale (German: Die Story von Monty Spinnerratz) is a 1997 fantasy film directed by Michael F. Huse, based on the 1985 children's book A Rat's Tale by Tor Seidler. The film features marionette work by German theater group Augsburger Puppenkiste. The live action cast include Beverly D'Angelo, Jerry Stiller, Lauren Hutton, and the German actor Josef Ostendorf.

The film was released in Germany on March 27, 1997, by Warner Bros. under their Family Entertainment label. It received a limited release in the United States on March 20, 1998, by Legacy Releasing.

== Cast ==
=== Live-action cast ===
- Josef Ostendorf as Mr. Lou Dollart
  - Danny Wells voices Mr. Lou Dollart in the English version.
- Beverly D'Angelo as Mrs. Dollart
- Jerry Stiller as Prof. Plumpingham
- Lauren Hutton as Evelyn Jellybelly
- Jonathan Kinsler as Architect Stressback
- Steffen Wink as Assistant Nick McRafferty
  - Scott Weil voices Assistant Nick McRafferty in the English version.
- Andreas Herder as Assistant Tom O'Dooley
  - Nicholas Benson voices Assistant Tom O'Dooley in the English version.
- Jack Recknitz as Mr. Adams
- Natja Brunckhorst as Mrs. Lucy
- Yoshinori Yamamoto as Futon San

=== German voice cast ===
- Philipp Moog as Monty Mad-Rat Jr. (Monty Spinnerratz)
- Carmen Plate as Isabella Noble-Rat (Isabella Nobelratz)
- Klaus Havenstein as Old Monty (Monty Senior)
- Gudo Hoegel as Rudi Rake-Rat (Rudi Raffratz)
- Donald Arthur as Jean-Paul Canalligator (Knaligator Charon)

=== German voice cast (English actors) ===
- Dagmar Heller as Mrs. Dollart
- Friedrich Georg Beckhaus as Prof. Plumpingham
- Oliver Feld as Tom O'Dolley

=== English voice cast ===
- Dee Bradley Baker as Monty Mad-Rat Jr.
- Lynsey Bartilson as Isabella Noble-Rat
- Raymond Guth as Old Monty
- Scott MacDonald as Rudi Rake-Rat
- Donald Arthur as Jean-Paul Canalligator

== Production ==
Filming took place in New York and an abandoned steelworks site in Duisburg. The interior sets were shot at Warner Bros. Movie World in Bottrop.

== Release ==
=== Home media ===
The film was released in the United States and Canada on VHS by Warner Home Video on May 12, 1998.
