= Tor Seidler =

American author of children's literature (born 1952)

- Born: 1952; Littleton, New Hampshire
- Occupations: Novelist, short story writer
- Writing career
- Language: English
- Period: 1979–present
- Genre: Children's literature
- Notable works: A Rat's Tale; The Wainscott Weasel
- Website: torseidler.com

Tor Seidler (born 1952 in Littleton, New Hampshire) is an American author of children's literature. Many of his books feature anthropomorphic animals. Mean Margaret was nominated for a National Book Award, The Wainscott Weasel was named a Notable Children's Book by the American Library Association, and A Rat's Tale was named Best Book of the Year by Publishers Weekly. In 1998, A Rat's Tale was adapted into a puppet film by Augsburger Puppenkiste and distributed by Warner Bros. Family Entertainment. 20th Century Fox Animation and Blue Sky Studios planned to adapt The Wainscott Weasel into a movie, which started development in 2003. However, Fox shelved the concept in 2006.

Seidler spent his first 11 years in Burlington, Vermont, where his stepfather led the theatre department at the University of Vermont. His family then moved to Seattle, Washington. Seidler studied literature at Stanford University. After graduation, he moved to New York City and worked as a bookstore clerk, waiter, bartender, and cab driver while pursuing a writing career. His first book, The Dulcimer Boy, was published in 1979, when he was 27 years old. In 1986, Seidler published his first children's animal story, A Rat's Tale. He has continued to write children's literature, and taught writing at The New School from 2002 to 2021.

== Published books ==
- The Dulcimer Boy (1979)
- Terpin (1982)
- A Rat's Tale (1985)
- The Tar Pit (1987)
- Take a Good Look (1990)
- The Steadfast Tin Soldier (HarperCollins, 1992) – picture book illustrated by Fred Marcellino, retelling the 1838 fairy tale by Hans Christian Andersen, LCCN 92-52690
- The Wainscott Weasel (1993)
- Mean Margaret (1997)
- The Silent Spinbills (1998)
- The Revenge of Randal Reese-Rat (2001)
- The Brothers Below Zero (2002)
- Brain Boy and the Death Master (2003)
- Toes (2006)
- Gully's Travels (Scholastic, 2008), OCLC 192081861
- Firstborn (2015)
