= The Robber Hotzenplotz =

German children's book character

The Robber Hotzenplotz (German: Der Räuber Hotzenplotz [deːɐ̯ ˈʁɔʏbɐ ˈhɔtsn̩ˌplɔts]) is a character created by German author Otfried Preußler for his children's book series of the same name. There are three books about Hotzenplotz:

- Der Räuber Hotzenplotz (1962). The Robber Hotzenplotz, trans. Anthea Bell (Abelard-Schuman, 1965)
- Neues vom Räuber Hotzenplotz (1969). The Further Adventures of the Robber Hotzenplotz, trans. Anthea Bell (Abelard-Schuman, 1970)
- Hotzenplotz 3 (1973). The Final Adventures of the Robber Hotzenplotz, trans. Anthea Bell (Abelard-Schuman, 1974)

All three books were illustrated by artist Josef Tripp, as were most of Preußler's works. These books were translated into at least 34 languages (e.g.: French: Le Brigand Briquambroque, Italian: Il Brigante Pennastorta, Spanish: El bandido Saltodemata, Turkish: Haydut Haytazot). Moreover, more than six million books were sold.

In 2018 another original manuscript by Preußler was discovered detailing an adventure with Hotzenplotz. Originally meant for a puppet theater play, it was released in late May 2018 with permission and cooperation of Preußler's daughter Susanne Preußler-Bitsch. This volume was illustrated by Thorsten Saleina and F. J. Tripp.

- Der Räuber Hotzenplotz und die Mondrakete (2018). "The Robber Hotzenplotz and the Moon Rocket"

== Origin ==
At the beginning of the 1960s Ottfried Preußler worked unsuccessfully on the initial approaches on Krabat. Due to the disappointment, he took the decision to change and to write something amusing. He decided to write about a clown tale (Kasper), which included all the typical characters of a clown story: Kasperl (the clown), Seppel, Grandmother, the robber, the police officer (who has the Bavarian name Alois Dimpfelmoser, wearing a spiked helmet), the wizard (Petrosilius Zwackelmann) and others. Preußler named the robber after a village in Silesia, which is called Hotzenplotz in German and Osoblaha in Czech. This name impressed Preußler very much during his childhood, so that he still remembered it. The book was published in 1962.

The first tale of the robber Hotzenplotz was very popular among the readers. Originally Preußler only planned to write a single book about the robber Hotzenplotz, but after receiving requests from children with detailed suggestions for further books about the robber, he decided to write another book about Hotzenplotz, seven years after publishing the first book.

Due to the fact that the dog Wasti, which was accidentally transformed into a crocodile by the widow Schlotterbeck and which was not transformed back into its original body at the end of the second book, Preußler again received letters from readers. For this reason he wrote a further book in which he took care of not leaving an open ending. Furthermore, he explained at the end of the book that it definitely was his last Kasper tale.

== Plot summary ==
=== The Robber Hotzenplotz ===
The smart robber Hotzenplotz attacks Kasperl's Grandmother and steals her coffee grinder, which is very valuable to her as it was a gift from Kasperl and Seppel. Moreover, the coffee grinder plays her favorite song "May Makes Everything Anew" while turning the crank. Kasperl and Seppel plan to catch the robber Hotzenplotz, as they do not think that local police officer Alois Dimpfelmoser is capable of doing so. They procure a wooden box, fill it with sand, bore a tiny hole in the bottom and stuff it with a match to find out where Hotzenplotz lives by leaving a trail of sand. After carrying the wooden box into the forest as a fake gold transport, Hotzenplotz appears immediately and takes it. At the same time, Kasperl and Seppel pull out the match and get themselves to safety.

Trusting that there is gold in the box, the robber brings it to his den. However, once Hotzenplotz discovers Kasperl and Seppel's trick, he creates a second track with the remaining sand from the box. As soon as Kasperl and Seppel find the second track, they decide to separate, and in order to deceive Hotzenplotz, they switch their hats. As they follow the trails separately, Hotzenplotz captures them one after the other. Kasperl begins playing the fool, so Hotzenplotz sells him to the wizard Petrosilius Zwackelmann. In the meantime, Seppel has to work for Hotzenplotz in his den, and in a fit of cruel fun Hotzenplotz throws Kasperl's hat into the hearth fire.

Zwackelmann needs a servant who peels his potatoes, as he is not able to peel them with magic. Kasperl continues playing the fool so that Zwackelmann gets very angry and thinks that it is a proof that Kasperl is too stupid to discover his magic secrets. In the night, Kasperl tries to escape from the wizard's castle of the wizard, but finds that is impossible to get past the ground's perimeter owing to Zwackelmann's magical wards.

When Zwackelmann visits a friend in Buxtehude one day, he leaves Kasperl in the castle. While Kasperl is alone, he suddenly hears somebody crying. Following the sounds down to the basement of the castle, Kasperl discovers a toad in a pond, which speaks human language. It turns out that the toad is a fairy named Amaryllis, who has been transformed into a toad by Zwackelmann; she asks Kasperl to get a certain plant, the fairy herb, which can be found only at a certain place during moonlight. Furthermore, she tells him how to escape from the castle by leaving a part of his personal clothes in the castle. Kasperl leaves Seppel's hat and starts his journey to find the fairy herb.

In the meantime, Zwackelmann returns from Buxtehude and notices that Kasperl has disappeared. Searching the grounds, he discovers Seppel's hat. He uses a magic spell on the hat to make Kasperl appear, but instead gets the real Seppel. Since Seppel was cleaning one of Hotzenplotz boots, Zwackelmann uses it to summon Hotzenplotz and begins berating him for burning Kasperl's hat, which renders him unable to get him back. When heated words are exchanged between them, Zwackelmann transforms Hotzenplotz into a bullfinch and puts him into a cage before leaving the castle to search for Kasperl.

In the meantime, Kasperl returns to the castle with the fairy herb. As it makes him invisible, he can return to the basement without any problems. The herb transforms the toad back into the fairy, just as Zwackelmann returns and finds Kasperl in the basement vault. Shocked, Zwackelmann drops his wand, and as he lunges after it, he falls down in the pond and dies. Grateful for her rescue, Amaryllis gives Kasperl a ring with three wishes, and after Seppel and the enchanted Hotzenplotz are recovered, she destroys Zwackelmann's castle and returns to the fairy world. Kasperl and Seppel go home, using two wishes to recover Kasperl's hat and Grandmother's coffee grinder, which now plays "May Makes Everything Anew" in a duet because of Amaryllis's magic. Bringing the enchanted Hotzenplotz to Dimpfelmoser's office, they use the last wish to turn him back to human form, whereupon Hotzenplotz is arrested and (in lack of a proper prison in town) locked into the local firehouse.

=== The Further Adventures of the Robber Hotzenplotz ===
By pretending that he suffers an appendicitis, Hotzenplotz overpowers Dimpfelmoser, takes his uniform and successfully escapes from the firehouse. Hotzenplotz plans on taking revenge on Kasperl and Seppel by blackmailing them into giving him the reward money for his capture. After donning Dimpfelmoser's uniform, Hotzenplotz seeks out Grandmother (who is strongly nearsighted) and eats the dinner she prepared for Kasperl and Seppel before revealing himself, causing Grandmother to faint.

Kasperl and Seppel show up at the firehouse to look after Hotzenplotz and find Dimpfelmoser asking them for help. Initially not believing his pleas, they later discover what happened to Grandmother, return to the firehouse and release Dimpfelmoser. After donning a spare uniform, Dimpfelmoser, Kasperl and Seppel attempt to lure Hotzenplotz back into the firehouse with the help of a false treasure map. Hotzenplotz discovers the ruse and locks Kasperl, Seppel and Dimpfelmoser into the firehouse, but they free themselves by using the fire truck to break through the walls.

In the meantime, Hotzenplotz returns to Grandmother's house, kidnaps her and brings her to his hideout, where she is forced to be his housekeeper. Dimpfelmoser, Kasperl and Seppel find a letter from Hotzenplotz demanding the reward money. As per the instructions, Kasperl and Seppel are supposed to bring the money alone. In order to keep an eye on them without Hotzenplotz knowing, Dimpfelmoser consults Mrs Schlotterbeck, a local widow and fortuneteller, and uses her crystal ball to observe the transaction.

Kasperl and Seppel surrender the money, but Hotzenplotz takes them prisoner as well. In his anger, Dimpfelmoser accidentally disrupts the crystal ball, rendering it temporarily useless. In order to find Hotzenplotz's hideout, Mrs Schlotterbeck lends her dog Wasti to Dimpfelmoser. Originally a dachshund, Wasti's body was transformed into a crocodile by a botched spell by Mrs Schlotterbeck when she had once dabbled in magic. Wasti leads Dimpfelmoser to Hotzenplotz's cave, where the dog - with its rather fearsome appearance - scares Hotzenplotz into surrendering himself and his captives. After their triumphant return, Hotzenplotz is transferred to the next district capital prison, and Grandmother cooks a sauerkraut and bratwurst dinner for everybody.

=== The Final Adventures of the Robber Hotzenplotz ===
Hotzenplotz is released from prison for good behavior and decides to give up his job as a professional bandit. He visits Kasperl and Seppel's grandmother to apologize for his previous attacks. However, Grandmother does not trust him and locks him up in her closet. Dimpfelmoser, now promoted to chief inspector, appears and is forced to release Hotzenplotz when the latter provides an official discharge letter. However, still distrusting him, Dimpfelmoser, Kasperl and Seppel visit widow Schlotterbeck to spy on Hotzenplotz with the help of her crystal ball. They observe him retrieving a supply of gunpowder and weapons from his old den. Unfortunately, night falls and the crystal ball turns dark, making them unable to see more.

Dimpfelmoser asks Schlotterbeck to observe Hotzenplotz as soon as the sun rises. Kasperl and Seppel set out to catch Hotzenplotz, as they assume that he intends new crimes. On their way to the den, they build a trap by rigging a trip rope and a sand bag to fall on their intended victim's head. When Seppel tests their trap, the sandbag falls on his head, knocking him out cold. Hotzenplotz arrives, and after helping Seppel recover, he convinces the boys that he wants to go straight, and proves his claims by destroying his remaining gunpowder before their eyes and then throwing his weapons into a moor. Afterwards, the three sit together to talk about Hotzenplotz's future. Hotzenplotz does not know what he wants to do, because he did not learn anything besides robbery.

As the night falls, Kasperl, Seppel and Hotzenplotz return to town, but on the outskirts they find a current "Wanted" poster of Hotzenplotz accusing him of having stolen Schlotterbeck's crystal ball. Kasperl and Seppel hide Hotzenplotz at Grandmother's house until they can prove his innocence. During the night, Kasperl receives a dream message from the fairy Amaryllis, who tells him that he needs a certain herb he knows to turn Wasti, Schlotterbeck's transformed dachshund, back into his old form.

The next day, Kasperl and Seppel go to Schlotterbeck to solve the case. There, they find out that Dimpfelmoser is looking for them with Wasti's help. Kasperl and Seppel find the crystal ball in Wasti's dog house, and conclude that Wasti has believed it to be a pumpkin after they had previously fed him some bits of an experimental pumpkin breed by Grandmother. When Kasperl and Seppel return to Grandmother's house to release Hotzenplotz, they only find a letter from Hotzenplotz, saying that he wants to go to America to become a gold digger.

Kasperl and Seppel want to find Hotzenplotz, but they need Wasti's help, so that they have to look for Dimpfelmoser first. In the meantime, Dimpfelmoser was led by Wasti to the moor where Kasperl and Seppel buried Hotzenplotz's weapons, and is stuck in the mire. Kasperl and Seppel just arrive in time and save him after convincing him of Hotzenplotz's innocence. Kasperl and Seppel continue their search with Wasti, find Hotzenplotz in the high heath near Zwackelmann's ruined castle, and convince him to stay. During their talk, Kasperl and Seppel realize that Amaryllis was talking about the fairy herb Kasperl once used to cure her of Zwackelmann's curse, and after finding the herb, they use it to cure Wasti. Schlotterbeck invites all to a celebration and takes a look into the future for Hotzenplotz, where she foresees that he will open a tavern called "The Robber's Den".

It is remarkable that in Hotzenplotz 3, Preußler turns around the pattern of the classical robber tale and introduces a subversive profile with the innocent suspect, who has to hide from the police.

== Adaptations ==
=== Movies ===
- In 1967 the Augsburger Puppenkiste presented the tale as a TV puppet show.
- In 1974 the movie The Robber Hotzenplotz was shown, directed by Gustav Ehmck and with Gert Fröbe in the titular role.
  In 1979 the second part was released as a movie (News from Hotzenplotz), still directed by Gustav Ehmck but with a completely new crew.
- In 1989 China's Shanghai Film Studio made a puppet animation series with the name "The big robber" (大盗贼).
- In 2006, there was a movie adaptation directed by Gernot Roll : The Robber Hotzenplotz.
- In 2022, there was a movie adaptation directed by Michael Krummenacher : The Robber Hotzenplotz.

=== Puppet show productions (selection) ===
- De Poppenspeeler (Bühne Kurt Seiler, Hannover)
- Augsburger Puppenkiste (Bühne Walter Oehmichen, Augsburg)
- Die Hohnsteiner (Bühne Harald Schwarz, Essen)
- Figurentheater Köln (Bühne Andreas Blaschke, Köln)
- Kammerpuppenspiele (Bühne Stefan Kühnel, Bielefeld)
- Puppentheater Luna (Bühne Rudi Piesk, Hörlitz)

=== Stage ===
- The theater group Wuppertal/Wuppertaler Bühnen shows Der Räuber Hotzenplotz as a family spectacle in 2017/18 in the version of the director Jean Renshaw and Peter Wallgram.
- The composer Andreas Tarkmann arranged a child opera, which premiere was in 2009, under the responsibility of Michael Schmitz-Aufterbeck in the Theater of Aachen.
- The group Showcase Beat Le Mot invented a performance from the tale for children from 6 years. The première was in March 2007 in the Berlin Theater in Parkaue.

== Editions ==
All books in German were published by Thienemann publishing.

- Der Räuber Hotzenplotz, ISBN 3-522-10590-7, 1962.
- Neues vom Räuber Hotzenplotz, ISBN 3-522-11520-1, 1969.
- Hotzenplotz 3, ISBN 3-522-11980-0, 1973.
- Der Räuber Hotzenplotz und die Mondrakete, ISBN 3-522-18559-5, 2018.
