= Kleiner König Kalle Wirsch =

- Country of origin: Germany
- No. of episodes: 4

Original release
- Release: November 8, 1970

Kleiner König Kalle Wirsch (Little King Kalle Wirsch) is a children's book by the German author Tilde Michels from 1969. In 1970 it was adapted into a German children's television series by the Augsburger Puppenkiste marionette theatre company.

== Plot ==
Kalle Wirsch, king of the earth manikins, rules over the 5 peoples: Wirschs (blond), Wolds (blue eyed), Gilchs (two little plaits), Trumps (green and black haired) and Murks (red plaits). Zoppo Trump, chief of the Trumps, wants to challenge Kalle Wirsch for a duel for the kingdom. According to earth manikin laws the royal dignity appertains to the winner. The fight shall be fought at full moon at the earth manikins stronghold Wiwogitrumu castle.

Zoppo Trump wants to gain royal dignity without fight. So he tries to thwart Kalle Wirsch to reach the fighting ground by several traps. The plans for the traps are made by Rat, whom Zoppo promised a ministerial portfolio. The plans are conducted by awkward Trumps Querro and Quarro and the Spider. The conspirators sing the song:

Wir legen eine Falle / das wird das Beste sein (We place a trap / that will be the best)
denn dieser kleine Kalle / fällt ganz bestimmt hinein (because this little Kalle / surely falls into it)
und ist er drin dann lassen wir ihn niemals wieder raus (and when he is in, we never let him out)
der Kalle hockt in der Falle / wie eine arme Maus. (the Kalle crouches in the trap / like a poor mouse.)

The conspirators of Zoppo kidnap Kalle to the earth's surface where he is baked into a garden gnome. Thanks to human children Jenny and Max, he is freed of his carceral. With the aid of the root Raxel, the kids are shrunk to follow Kalle into the inner of the earth. During the journey to the earth manikin's stronghold, Kalle and the children escape further traps and obstacles. Kalle even has to vanquish Murrumesch the Dragon before he can reach the stronghold in the belly of a fireworm. To Zoppo's dismay the fight happens. The fight consists of three challenges. Despite an injured hand, Kalle wins 2:1.

== Characters ==
- Little King Kalle Wirsch, king of the earth manikins
- Jenny and Max, two human children who accompany Kalle into the inner of the earth
- Tutulla, a bat, friend of Kalle, narratress, commenting the story in Swiss accent
- Zoppo Trump, called "the Strong", leader of the Trumps and contender of Kalle
- Quarro and Querro, two strong but awkward subordinates of Zoppo (only in the marionette version)
- The Rat, counsellor and conspirator of Zoppo
- The Spider, conspirator of Zoppo (only in the marionette version)
- Coal Juke, coal worker with a fascination for the human world
- Blind Ferryman, hauls the earth manikins to their stronghold. Zoppo corrupts him to drown Kalle in the middle of the sea. He is based on Charon, the ferryman in the underworld of Greek mythology
- Murrumesch, a dragon hostile to the earth manikins

== Media ==
=== Books ===
- Tilde Michels: Kleiner König Kalle Wirsch. pictures by Rüdiger Stoye. Hoch, Düsseldorf 1969.
- Tilde Michels: Kleiner König Kalle Wirsch. dtv, München 2001, ISBN 3-423-70639-2.
- Tilde Michels: Kleiner König Kalle Wirsch. Süddeutsche Zeitung Bibliothek, München 2006, ISBN 3-866-15135-7.

=== Musical ===
- Christian Gundlach (by Tilde Michels): Kleiner König Kalle Wirsch. Whale Songs, Hamburg

=== Long-playing record ===
- Kleiner König Kalle Wirsch. Disneyland Records DQ 9407 (television edition)

=== CD ===
- Kleiner König Kalle Wirsch. 3 CDs, audiobook read by Wolfgang Völz, Hörcompany, ISBN 3-935-03676-0.
- Kleiner König Kalle Wirsch. 1 CD, audiobook read by Bernd Kohlhepp, Bibliographisches Institut, ISBN 3-794-18561-7.

=== Video ===
- Augsburger Puppenkiste: Kleiner König Kalle Wirsch. Part 1 (2 Folgen), Sony Music Entertainment
- Augsburger Puppenkiste: Kleiner König Kalle Wirsch. Part 2 (2 Folgen), Sony Music Entertainment

=== DVD ===
- Augsburger Puppenkiste: Kleiner König Kalle Wirsch. Lighthouse Home Entertainment

== Literature ==
- Barbara van den Speulhof, Fred Steinbach (Hrsg.): Das große Buch der Augsburger Puppenkiste. (= anniversary edition for the 65-year existence and the 60. TV-Birthday of Augsburger Puppenkiste). Boje Verlag, Köln 2013, ISBN 978-3-414-82354-0, S. 124–125.
