= Max Jacob (puppeteer) =

German puppeteer

Max Jacob (born 10 August 1888 in Bad Ems; died 8 December 1967 in Hamburg) was a German puppeteer and the developer of the Hohnsteiner Kasper Theatre in the 1920s.

Kasper Theatre, or Kasperle, is the German equivalent of Punch and Judy, a traditional form of puppetry which has its origins in the Italian commedia dell'arte.

== History ==
From an early age Max Jacob had been involved with the Wandervogel movement and was very interested in folk arts and folk traditions. When, in 1921, he saw a puppet show for the first time, he purchased his own puppets and gave a performance to an audience mostly made up of other friends of the Wandervogel movement.

After this, he set up the Hartensteiner Puppenspiele, which was renamed Hohensteiner Puppenspiele when Jacob and many of his troupe moved to Hohnsteiner Castle in 1928, where they lived and worked together. Many audience members were also guests at the castle, which functioned not only as the troupe's home, but as a youth hostel. The troupe, as well as craftsmen and -women involved in the construction of the puppets and the staging, began to transform the style of the Kasper theatre, changing it from a fairground show, with an emphasis on slapstick humour and irreverent anti-authoritarianism, into a theatrical art with a pedagogical purpose. Jacob explained of Kasper that "Er tut das Moralische rein vorbildlich, er moralisiert aber nicht. Und dieses Vorbild nehmen die Kinder in sich auf" (He does what is moral simply by example, but he does not moralise. And the children internalise this example).

In 1933, the troupe had to leave the Hohnsteiner Castle because the Nazis had taken it over and turned it into a concentration camp. The troupe moved to a multi-family house, where they again lived and performed. The house became known as the Kasperhaus, and the troupe reconstructed it at the Exposition Internationale des Arts et Techniques dans la Vie Moderne (1937) (more notorious for the other showpiece from Nazi Germany by Albert Speer). They were awarded a Gold Medal. After this, the troupe began to make international tours, and to produce Kasper in different media (film, particularly short film, television, even radio).

During the 1940s, the Hohnsteiner Puppenspiele entertained the troops, and functioned as the showpiece puppet theatre during the Nazi era.

Many of Jacob's original troupe were killed in the war, or had left the troupe, so after the war Jacob and the remaining members – as well as some new additions such as the composer Irmgard Wassmann - began afresh with the Hohnsteiner Theatre in Hamburg. During this post-war period, the troupe gave performances in prisoner of war camps, detention centres, and convalescent homes for former concentration camp inmates, and orphanages.

Jacob retired from the puppet theatre in 1953 but remained close to the theatre until his death in 1967. In this time he attended conferences and seminars and in 1957 was selected as president of the international puppeteers association, UNIMA. He held this position until his death.

Puppeteers such as Friedrich Arndt, Harald Schwarz and Erich Kürschner continued the legacy of Jacob and the Hohnsteiner Puppenspiele.

== Style ==
Max Jacob's Hohnsteiner Kasper differed from the earlier fairground Kasper in its moral intention to instil "values" into its younger audience members, and in its self-definition as a theatre form rather than a fairground entertainment. In contrast to the fairground Kasper, which had borrowed from the British Punch and Judy stories that showed Punch throwing his crying baby out the window, beating his wife, as well as an array of authority figures, Jacob's Kasper was more childlike in character, as well as being wiser and on friendly terms with the policeman (Wachtmeister). Along with the slapstick element, Jacob's troupe removed bawdiness and smutty language.

The Hohensteiner Kasper Theatre relied less on props and scenery than the earlier Kasper Theatre and instead used an assortment of curtains behind the figures. They also played in a room rather than on the traditional Spielleiste. They also introduced music to Kasper theatre, provided above all by one of the Hohnsteiner troupe's later additions, the composer Irmgard Wesemann, who joined them in 1945. The music gave a prominent place to the accordion, which would be played from behind the stage while Kasper himself mimed a mini-performance.

== Literature ==
- Max Jacob: Mein Kasper und ich (Autobiographie), Rudolstadt 1964.
- Richard Schimrich: Das Handpuppen-Laienspielbuch der Hohnsteiner, Reichenau 1942.
- Herbert Just (Hrsg.): Mensch, Narr, Weiser - Puppenspieler (Festgabe zu Jacobs 70. Geburtstag), Kassel 1958.
- Wolfgang Hensel, Gerd J. Pohl (Vorwort): Kaspers Weg von Ost nach West (mit einem ausführlichen Kapitel über Max Jacob und die Hohnsteiner Puppenspiele), Dettelbach 2008, ISBN 978-3-89754-301-0

== See also ==
- Kasperle
- Punch and Judy
- Commedia dell'arte
- Puppetry
