= Fünf auf dem Apfelstern =

- Country of origin: Germany

Fünf auf dem Apfelstern is a German television series.

== See also ==
- List of German television series
