= Impy's Island =

- Theatrical release poster
- Directed by: Reinhard Klooss; Holger Tappe
- Written by: Oliver Huzly; Reinhard Klooss; Max Kruse; Sven Severin
- Based on: Urmel from the Ice Age by Max Kruse
- Produced by: Reinhard Klooss; Holger Tappe
- Starring: Wigald Boning; Anke Engelke; Florian Halm; Christoph Maria Herbst; Kevin Iannotta; Ulrike Johanssen; Stefan Krause; Oliver Pocher; Domenic Redl; Frank Schaff; Klaus Sonnenschein; Wolfgang Völz
- Music by: James Dooley
- Production companies: Bavaria Pictures; Ambient Entertainment
- Distributed by: Falcom Media
- Release date: 17 February 2006 (Germany)
- Running time: 87 minutes
- Country: Germany
- Language: German

Impy's Island, or Urmel from the Ice Age (German: Urmel aus dem Eis), is a 2006 German animated feature film based on the children's novel Urmel from the Ice Age by Max Kruse. It was followed by Impy’s Wonderland (Urmel voll in Fahrt) in 2008.

== Plot ==
On a magical tropical island called Tikiwoo in the 1950s, a fun-loving group of misfit animals and people make a marvelous discovery: a baby Mamenchisaurus that was frozen since prehistoric times. Little Impy, as they call him, is loving his new family and ready to explore the strange new world. But when a king from a faraway country vows to capture the lovable baby Mamenchisaurus for his private collection, all the inhabitants of Impy's island must join together to save their new friend.

== Cast ==
The film stars the voice talents of:

- Wigald Boning as Professor Habakuk Tibatong
- Anke Engelke as Wutz
- Florian Halm as Diener Sami
- Christoph Maria Herbst as Doctor Zwengelmann
- Kevin Iannotta as Tim Tintenklecks
- Stefan Krause as Ping
- Oliver Pocher as Schusch
- Domenic Redl as Urmel
- Frank Schaff as Wawa
- Klaus Sonnenschein as King Pumponell
- Wolfgang Völz as Seele-Fant

For the American release, the voice talents are the following:

- Lisa Ortiz as Impy the Mamenchisaurus (Image Entertainment dub)
- Emlyn Morinelli McFarland as Impy the Mamenchisaurus (HanWay Films dub)
- Zoe Martin as Ping the king penguin
- Maddie Blaustein as Shoe the shoebill
- Sean Schemmel as King Pumponell the 55th
- Charlotte Mahoney as Peg the pig
- Pete Bowlan as Sami
- Michael Sinterniklaas as Professor Horatio Tibberton
- Jimmy Zoppi as Monty the monitor lizard
- Alan Smithee as Dr. Zonderburgh
- P.J. Battisti, Jr. as Tim
- Michael Alston Baley as Solomon the elephant seal

== Release ==
The DVD was released in Germany on 12 February 2007 by Warner Home Video under their Family Entertainment label.

== See also ==
- List of animated feature films
- List of computer-animated films
