= Book of Brownies =

1926 book by Enid Blyton

The Book of Brownies
- First edition
- Author: Enid Blyton
- Illustrator: Ernest Aris
- Language: English
- Genre: Fantasy
- Published: 1926
- Publisher: George Newnes Ltd
- OCLC: 316061908

The Book of Brownies is a book by Enid Blyton published in 1926.

The Book of Brownies is the story of three naughty brownies: Hop, Skip and Jump, who are tricked by Witch Green-eyes into helping her to kidnap the Princess Peronel. They are banished from Fairyland until they find their "Goodness". They decide that they have an obligation to save the Princess from the Witch and have many adventures. Their adventures include confronting various messy situations like being caught in a cottage without a door, accidentally bumping into the island of the notorious red goblin, then in an island of giants, then their adventure in the Land of Clever People where one has to always speak in rhyme and make up a riddle everyday, then in the Green Railway and Toadstool Town. They also fight the Golden dwarf, rescue the Dragon-bird and finally, after encountering countless odd adventures, rescue the princess.
