= Kasperle =

Puppet character

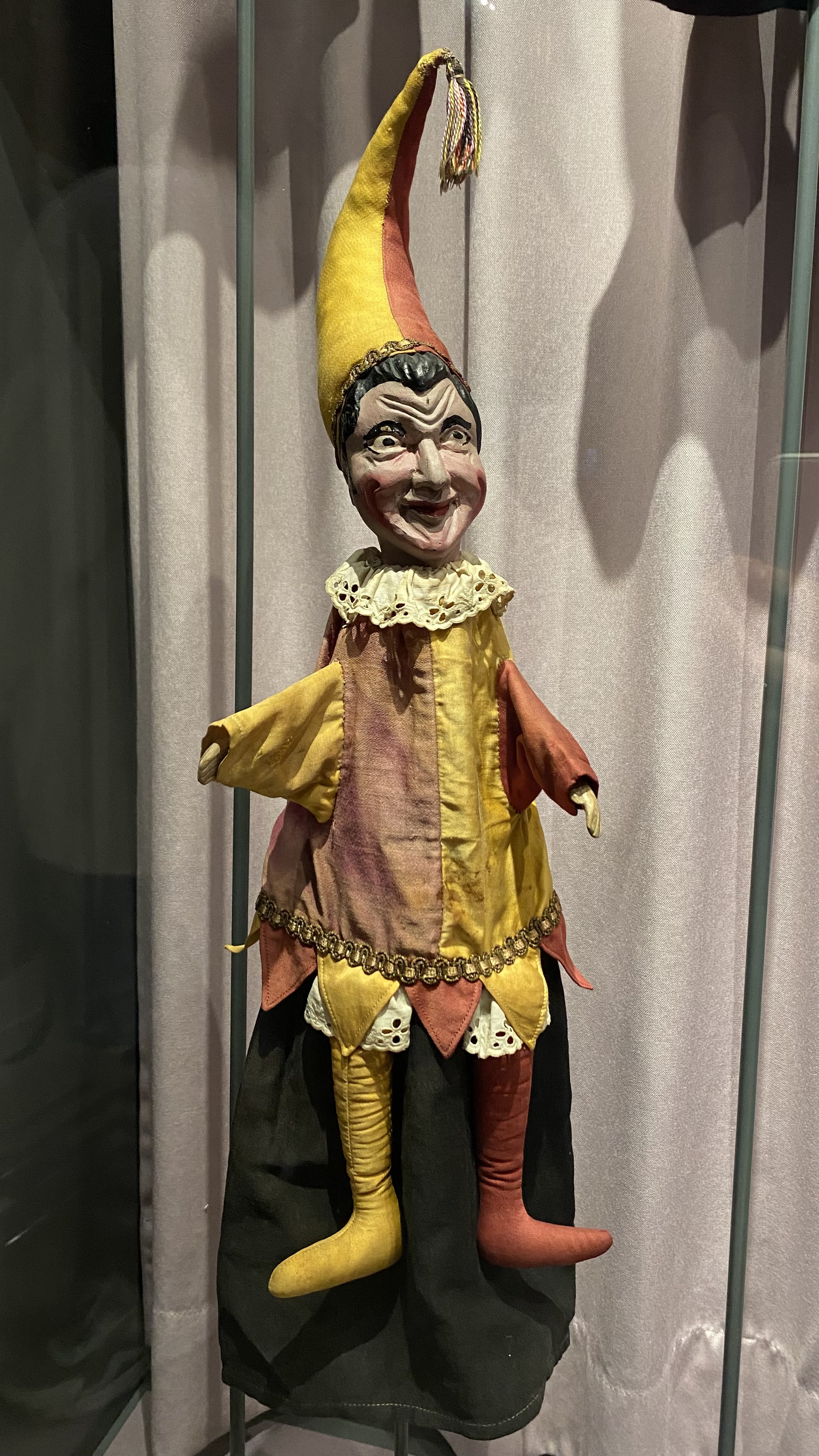
Kasperle, a puppet from the "Kaiserwursti" (Vienna Prater), ca. 1860. Wien Museum (Inv. no. 174737/5).

Kasperle, Kasper, or Kasperl (different spellings in German variants and dialects (Note: Bavarian German: Káschberl, Swabian German: Kaschberle, Swiss German: Chaschperli, Austrian German: Káschperl, South Tyrolean: Kaschpole); Czech: kašpárek) is a traditional puppet character from Austria, German-speaking Switzerland and Germany. Its roots date to 17th century, and it was at times so popular that Kasperltheater was synonymous with puppet theater. Kasperltheater includes various sets of puppets. In some German settings the following characters occur: Kasper, Gretel, Seppel, Grandmother, princess, king, witch, robber, and crocodile. In Austria, Kasperl usually occurs alongside Pezi (the bear), Buffi (the dragon) or Mimi (the goose), and usually Großmutter and Großvater. The older, more traditional Kasperle shows are very similar to "Mister Punch". There are also "Kasperle versions" of the Grimm and other fairy tales and of "modern fairy tales".

== Background ==
Kasper (known as Kasperl in Austria and Kasperle in southern Germany) is the hero of German puppet theater. The name Kasper probably comes from the ancient Persian meaning "keeper of the treasure." Tradition holds one of the three Magi who visited the Christ Child was named Caspar. This character also existed in the mystery plays of the medieval Church.

Kasper, along with France's Guignol, and Britain's Punch and Judy, has his origins in the character of Pulcinella, a stock character of the Italian Commedia dell'Arte. Pulcinella was a violent character typically dressed in white clothing, a long white hat, and a black mask. The character is generally identified with Naples.

The puppet character currently named Kasper first appeared in Munich in 1858 in a marionette play (The Enchanted Lily) by Graf Pocci. Like his cousin Punch, the early Kasper used a slapstick to beat the devil, witch, and crocodile.

== Hohnsteiner style ==
In 1920, Max Jacob introduced the form of Kasper Theater recognized today. Kasper became a positive hero, eventually stopped using the slapstick, and took on a more childlike quality. This form is called the Hohnsteiner style (after Hohnstein Castle in Saxony where Max Jacob and his troupe lived and Kasper performances were held).

Modern Kasper plays involve Kasper helping his friends (Grandma, Seppel, the Princess, etc.) with various problems. For example, the Witch turns Seppel into a chicken or someone steals Grandma's cake. The structure of Kasper theater is also used to retell Grimm Fairy Tales such as Hansel and Gretel and Little Red Riding Hood. In Southern Germany and Austria, Kasper is known as Kasperle or Kasperl (the diminutive form of Kasper).

Kasper and his friends often teach children important values about friendship, caution, justice, quick-witted response, resolve, and good-natured humor. Children's reactions are often encouraged and incorporated into the play's progression. Here is a list of standard characters and typical situations, which arise from the contrast of characters.

- Kasper is our unbeatable hero. He laughs and jokes, even in the face of danger. Kasper is always ready for an adventure with his friends. He uses puns, wordplay, and wit to win the day. Since Kasper is childlike himself, children identify closely with him. In the skits, children accompany Kasper on his adventures, and together they bravely face danger.
- Gretel is Kasper's good friend or, sometimes, his wife. She is clever, practical, and helpful. She often helps Kasper by outsmarting the villains. She has many positive traits.
- Seppel is Kasper's other good friend. He is easygoing, occasionally clever, and strong. He never passes up a good meal. He often warns Kasper about going on risky adventures and scares easily
- The Policeman represents authority and society's laws. He is a good friend and helps to set things right. The Policeman is often asked for advice. Though he may overlook Kasper's pranks, he will give Kasper a stern look or warning reinforcing the value of rules in society.
- The Robber is rotten, mean, filthy, a liar, and lazy to boot! He is very strong, but luckily he isn't very bright. Hence, he is always caught and punished.
- Besides being evil, stubborn, easily annoyed, and crafty, the Witch can cast spells and often teams up other villains. She is the role children frequently choose to act out aggression or unexpressed conflict.
- The Wizard is powerful, wise, and helpful. He only uses his powers for good. However, he tends to take himself too seriously, and when Kasper is having fun at his expense, he will often ask, “Don’t you know who I am?” The Wizard's outrageous entrances are often a great source of laughter.
- The Crocodile has a large snapping mouth filled with sharp teeth. He is a mindless eating machine.
- Grandma is both wise and an expert on manners. She is the calm point in any Kasper play. Grandma often rewards Kasper and Seppel with sausages after their adventures. By allowing her grandchildren their adventures without being too strict, Grandma leads the children down the path to individual identity.
- The King is powerful and just in his decisions. He rewards the characters for their bravery. It is often only with Kasper's help that the King can remove danger from his realm. The royal family often represents the child's own family. These characters are also used to imitate adult relationships such as courtship and marriage.
- The Devil impersonates negative attributes, like egotism, greed or hunger for power. He attempts to seduce Kasper and others to give in to them, illustrating their destructive effects on the community to the audience.

== Other modern Kaspars ==
Bread and Puppet Theater, an American-based company under the direction of Silesian-born Peter Schumann, often presents short skits by the fictitious "Rotten Idea Theater Company", which features multiple Kaspars. The Kaspars are generally violent, dishonest tricksters, and play out some form of political or social satire while beating each other with clubs.

== Kasper's cousins ==
Punch was introduced in Great Britain in the seventeenth century by an Italian performer named Pietro Gimonde. The original Pulcinella was a marionette. Over time, his name was anglicized to "Punch," and he became a hand puppet. "Pleased as punch" and "beat the devil" probably originated from Punch and Judy puppet theater.

Whereas the Max Jacob-inspired Kaspar has abandoned much of the bawdiness of 17th century street performance, Punch embraces it. The traditional Kasper and modern Punch use a slapstick to beat the crocodile, police, and even the Devil. "Slapstick" originates from the Commedia Dell'arte baton made of wooden slats fastened together like a castanet. On impact, the slapstick makes a loud slapping sound. The term has become synonymous with physical comedy.

Punch is aggravated by his whining child, nagging wife (Judy), and ineffective bureaucracy. This eventually leads to Punch hitting other characters with his slapstick, but it is a very ritualized form of violence. Traditional shows ended with Punch defeating the ultimate evil and proclaiming "Huzzah, Huzzah, I've killed the Devil!" In modern endings, Punch is punished by being swallowed by the crocodile, scared into repentance by a ghost, or arrested by the police.

Punch performances also differ from Kasper by use of a "swazzle." The swazzle is used to give Punch a high pitched, squeaky sound. Punch performances are usually put on by "professors". In some cases, Punch may be unintelligible, and the "professor" must act as an interpreter.

During the 19th Century, Punch performances could be easily found on the streets of England. Today, they are much less common. As a continuing English tradition, Punch performances are more likely to be found on the beach during holidays.

Forms of Pulcinella can be found throughout Europe and even Turkey. The characters have different names in various countries. In France, he is known as Polichinelle (Guignol, a figure developed in the 19th century around Lyon, shares many features with Polichinelle but cannot be said to derive directly from Polichinelle). In the Netherlands, he is Jan Klaassen, a character whose personality varies greatly from region to region—sometimes sweet, sometimes a trickster. Turkey's Karagoz and the Greek Karaghiozis descend from a common Ottoman shadow puppet tradition; the origin of these traditions and the relationship, if any, to the Pulchinella "family" is unknown. Likewise, the Javanese shadow puppet figure of Petruk, shares characteristics with these European figures—some Javanese identify Petruk as a European—and it is tempting but impossible to confirm a historical relationship.

Stravinsky made the Russian Petrushka famous with his ballet of the same name. This story involves three puppets (Petrushka, the Ballerina, and the Moor) that come to life. Eventually, Petrushka is murdered by the Moor out of jealousy for the Ballerina. In the final scene, it's discovered that Petrushka was just stuffed with hay all along.
