= Chris McCaleb =

American film director, producer and screenwriter (born 1978)

- Born: March 14, 1978 (age 48); Evanston, Illinois, United States
- Occupations: Film editor, director, producer
- Years active: 2000–present
- Website: chrismccaleb.com

Chris McCaleb (born March 14, 1978) is an American film editor, director and producer best known as the co-creator of the web series Prom Queen and co-host of the Better Call Saul Insider and New Mediacracy podcasts. McCaleb was nominated three times for the Primetime Emmy Award for Outstanding Picture Editing for a Drama Series, once for his work on the AMC neo-western crime drama series Breaking Bad (2013), and twice on the AMC legal crime drama series Better Call Saul (2015–2022).

== Early life ==
McCaleb was born in Evanston, Illinois, but grew up primarily in Tucson, Arizona. He graduated from Loyola Marymount University in 2000 with a degree in Film Production. After college, McCaleb worked in post-production and as an editor and assistant editor, most notably under filmmakers Michael Mann and John Sayles.

== Sam Has 7 Friends ==
In 2006, while working for Michael Mann on the film Miami Vice, McCaleb was approached by co-worker Chris Hampel to join fellow filmmakers Douglas Cheney and Ryan Wise and producer Marcus Blakely in an experiment: an 80-episode serialized drama for the internet. The experiment came to be known as Sam Has 7 Friends.

The story followed aspiring actress Samantha Breslow, and her relationships with each of her seven friends. The series ran from August 28 to December 15, 2006, when one of Sam's seven friends murdered her.

Produced on a total budget of $50,000, the series garnered nearly 3 Million views during its initial run, and landed McCaleb and his co-creators representation at United Talent Agency, which had just begun to look for talent online.

== Big Fantastic ==
During the production of "Sam Has 7 Friends," McCaleb, Cheney, Hampel and Wise formed the filmmaking collective and production company Big Fantastic, specializing in the creation and production of high-quality scripted online programming.

== Prom Queen ==
After the success of "Sam Has 7 Friends," Big Fantastic created their next project, the high school murder mystery Prom Queen. McCaleb was the co-creator, and served as a director, writer, and producer. Funded by Michael Eisner's new production company, Vuguru, the series was an instant success, with over 15 million views of the episodes during the original 12-week run, and has been viewed by over 40 million people to date.

A 15-episode spinoff series, Prom Queen: Summer Heat, was quickly ordered by Eisner, with production taking place in Los Angeles; Nogales, Mexico; and McCaleb's hometown of Tucson.

In 2009, McCaleb and Big Fantastic produced a third season of "Prom Queen." Titled "The Homecoming," the 22-episode series debuted in Canada on July 4, 2010, on CityTV, and was released in the United States in October 2012 on The CW's website.
