= Control TV =

2010 web series

- Directed by: Douglas Cheney; Chris McCaleb; Ryan Wise
- Starring: Tristan Couvares
- Country of origin: United States
- Original language: English
- No. of seasons: 1
- No. of episodes: 32

Production
- Executive producers: Ken Fuchs; Seth Green; Stephen Kessler; Richard Saperstein; Matthew Senreich; Craig Ullman; Digital Broadcasting Group
- Production locations: Los Angeles, CA, United States
- Running time: 24/7 live stream 3-4 minute episodes

Original release
- Release: October 6 – November 16, 2010

ControlTV is a live interactive reality web show executive produced by Seth Green and directed by Big Fantastic (the filmmaking collective behind series such as Prom Queen). Starting October 6, 2010, 25-year-old Tristan Couvares began the experiment of having his life filmed all day, every day, for a duration of 6 weeks.

== Awards ==
ControlTV was awarded Digital Luminary Award from the National Association of Television Program Executives (NAPTE) and receiving an Honorable Mention during the 2011 Webby Awards.

== About ==
ControlTV produced by actor Seth Green, Matthew Senrich, Ken Fuchs, Steve Kessler, Richard Saperstein, Craig Ullman, and Shara Kay documented the life of Tristan Couvares for six weeks, starting October 6, 2010. The show was streamed live 24/7, and short, re-cap episodes were posted every weekday. The fans of Control TV had been dubbed "the controllers" and voted on various aspects of daily life such as what Tristan would eat, when he would wake up and what he would wear. At one point, the majority of the viewers voted for Tristan Couvares to have an hour off camera. During the show, many cuss words were bleeped out with a splash screen displaying the word "whoops" and a small repeating audio clip.

== Viewership ==
In its first 14 days of release, ControlTV received more than 3 million completed unique episode views, with viewers staying for an average of 27 minutes per visit on the live feed. By the end of season one the show had accumulated over 13 million completed unique episode views.

== Sponsorship ==
Ford, Snickers, and Sprint were sponsors of the show. Tristan Couvares drove a Ford and used a Sprint cell phone. Every few days, Tristan Couvares would eat a Snickers bar on camera. At the end of the series, the viewers voted to let Tristan Couvares keep the Ford Fiesta that was provided by Ford.

== Episodes ==
No.	Title	Original release date
0.1	"Episode 0.1: This is Tristan"	September 28, 2010
Meet our guy.
0.2	"Episode 0.2: The Adventure Begins"	October 6, 2010
Tristan moves in.
1	"Episode 1: Under Our Control"	October 7, 2010
He's ours now.
2	"Episode 2: The Week Unwrapped"	October 9, 2010
Facts of life.
3	"Episode 3: Pet Peeves"	October 11, 2010
Tristan gets a hamster and goes on a blind date.
4	"Episode 4: Dirty Work"	October 12, 2010
Being a weiner ain't easy.
5	"Episode 5: Homesick"	October 13, 2010
Despite all the fun, Tristan misses his family.
6	"Episode 6: Face to Face"	October 14, 2010
Tristan meets girls and gets a new haircut.
7	"Episode 7: The Week Unwrapped"	October 15, 2010
Tristan works out with three personal trainers.
8	"Episode 8: Camera Shy"	October 18, 2010
Tristan invites Jamie to dinner and gives his new style and cooking skills a spin.
9	"Episode 9: Comfort Zone"	October 19, 2010
Tristan gets advice from an entrepreneur and steps outside his comfort zone.
10	"Episode 10: Girl Talk"	October 20, 2010
Tristan works as a "pool boy" and tries to get a second date with Jamie.
11	"Episode 11: Curve Balls"	October 21, 2010
Tristan gets several surprises, including a video call from his ex.
12	"Episode 12: The Week Unwrapped"	October 22, 2010
Tristan sees his experiences starting to pay off.
13	"Episode 13: Don't Stop Dreaming"	October 25, 2010
Tristan explores the music industry.
14	"Episode 14: Making His Move"	October 26, 2010
Tristan tries to get comfortable dating on camera.
15	"Episode 15: Unexpected Guests"	October 27, 2010
Tristan's sister surprises him with a visit.
16	"Episode 16: Lizzie's Revenge"	October 28, 2010
Tristan makes a 1-minute horror film.
17	"Episode 17: The Week Unwrapped"	October 29, 2010
Tristan prepares for Halloween and hosts an unusual couch-surfer.
18	"Episode 18: Bullseye!"	November 1, 2010
Tristan has his first kiss on ControlTV.
19	"Episode 19: Training Days"	November 2, 2010
Tristan considers a career in sports.
20	"Episode 20: Going the Distance"	November 3, 2010
Tristan drives voters to the polls.
21	"Episode 21: Stand-up guy"	November 4, 2010
Tristan performs a stand-up comedy routine.
22	"Episode 22: The Week Unwrapped"	November 5, 2010
Tristan has a great Halloween week on ControlTV.
23	"Episode 23: Web Celeb"	November 8, 2010
Tristan hosts a party for web celebrities.
24	"Episode 24: Host with the Most"	November 9, 2010
Tristan interviews celebrities on the red carpet.
25	"Episode 25: Ladies' Man"	November 10, 2010
Tristan goes on speed-dates, a blind date, and tries his hand at modeling.
26	"Episode 26: No Pain, No Gain"	November 11, 2010
Tristan toughs it out through some painful and uncomfortable moments.
27	"Episode 27: The Week Unwrapped"	November 12, 2010
Tristan considers all of the career possibilities that ControlTV has presented.
28	"Episode 28: Day-cation"	November 15, 2010
Tristan takes a day trip to Santa Barbara and goes paragliding.
29	"Episode 29: Decathletes"	November 16, 2010
Tristan competes in a (do)decathlon vs. production assistant Mike
30	"Episode 30: 1,008 Hours"	November 17, 2010
Tristan hosts a "Webathon", wins the Fiesta, and bids farewell.
