= Big Fantastic =

Big Fantastic, L.L.C.
- Company logo
- Company type: LLC
- Industry: Entertainment
- Founded: Santa Monica, California, USA (2006)
- Headquarters: Santa Monica, CA, USA
- Key people: Ryan Wise, Director; Douglas Cheney, Director; Chris McCaleb, Director; Chris Hampel, Director
- Products: Web Series
- Website: bigfantastic.com

Big Fantastic, LLC is a filmmaking collective and production company located in Santa Monica, California which creates, develops and produces online video entertainment. The company is currently most known for their popular web series Sam Has 7 Friends and Prom Queen. Recent project include the web experiment Control TV, the web sitcom Cockpit, Foreign Body, a prequel to the Robin Cook novel, and Sorority Forever for The WB.

== Overview ==
Big Fantastic started as an ambitious attempt by Douglas Cheney, Chris McCaleb, Ryan Wise, and Chris Hampel to revolutionize the web series phenomenon by serializing dramatic content into a short, daily 90 second format. The company also expands their product into the metaverse by giving the characters in their shows MySpace pages and Blogs. Big Fantastic originally was funded completely out of their own pockets, but has now made deals with Warner Brothers, Vuguru, Generate LA-NY, 60 Frames and other companies for further productions. The Big Fantastic company was Emmy nominated twice for the Outstanding Broadband Drama award in 2007. One nomination for Sam Has 7 Friends and one for Prom Queen.

== Shows ==
=== 2006 ===
- Sam Has 7 Friends

=== 2007 ===
- Prom Queen
- Prom Queen: Summer Heat

=== 2008 ===
- Cockpit
  Cockpit is a comedy web series about the fictional employees of Mile High Airlines. All five episodes were taped one day at Air Hollywood in the same cockpit set that the film Airplane! was shot in. The cast includes David Storrs as Capt. Kent Gaskins, Tim Halling as Capt. John Pinneke, Mikaela Hoover as Trixie Sanders, Tim Coyne as Dan Wishbone, and Kelly Marchand as Jenny Jackson.
- Foreign Body
- Sorority Forever

=== 2010 ===
- Control TV
- Kill Spin

=== 2012 ===
- Prom Queen: The Homecoming
