= Sorority Forever =

- Created by: Big Fantastic
- Directed by: Doug Cheney, Chris Hampel, Chris McCaleb, Ryan Wise
- Starring: Jessica Rose
- Country of origin: United States
- No. of episodes: 40

Production
- Producers: Big Fantastic, TheWB.com, McG
- Running time: 90 seconds
- Production company: Warner Horizon Television

Original release
- Network: TheWB.com
- Release: September 8 – October 31, 2008

Related
- SamHas7Friends, Prom Queen

Sorority Forever is a web series created and produced by web production company Big Fantastic, the creators of SamHas7Friends and Prom Queen. Film director McG is an executive producer of the show. The first season of the series, which debuted September 8, 2008 on TheWB.com, followed four incoming freshmen in "the hottest sorority on campus". While it had some Gossip Girl elements to it, it "also contain(ed) a lot of mystery similar to Prom Queen."

== Cast ==
- Jessica Rose as Julie Gold
- Jessica Morris as Natalie Gold
- Taryn Southern as Taryn Monaghan
- Mikaela Hoover as Madison Westerbrook
- Angie Cole as Naomi King
- Annemarie Pazmino as Rachel
- Candice Patton as Mercedes Muna
- David Loren as Matthew
- Anabella Casanova as Bridget Reynolds
- Joaquin Pastor as Joaquin
- Cary Hungerford as Blake

The show also features original music from up and coming artists The White Tie Affair, J Hall, and Tyroneus.

== Awards and nominations ==
Streamy Awards:

- Streamy Award for Best Dramatic Web Series (2009) (nomination)
