= Foreign Body (web series) =

- Created by: Big Fantastic
- Directed by: Doug Cheney, Chris Hampel, Chris McCaleb, Ryan Wise
- Starring: Pranidhi Varshney; Wes McGee; Rachna Khatau
- Countries of origin: United States; France
- No. of episodes: 50

Production
- Producers: Vuguru; Cyber Group Studios
- Running time: 120 seconds per episode

Original release
- Release: May 27 – August 4, 2008

Foreign Body was a 2008 web series coproduced by the production companies Vuguru (owned by former Walt Disney CEO Michael Eisner), Cyber Group Studios (owned by the former Walt Disney executives Dominique Bourse and Pierre Sissmann), and Big Fantastic (owned by the creators of the series SamHas7Friends and Prom Queen). The series, which ran from May 27 through August 4, 2008, comprised 50 episodes of approximately 2 minutes each, with a new video posted every weekday.

The series was a prequel and promotion for the Robin Cook novel of the same name, which was released on August 5, 2008, the day after the series finale. Portions of the series shot in India, and it cost a reported $10,000 per episode to create.

== Plot ==
The core plot of Foreign Body concerns "medical tourism in India, focusing on “a group of dangerous Indian beauties” whose nursing skills will be put to some nefarious use".

== See also ==
- Big Fantastic
