= Mikaela Hoover =

American actress (born 1984)

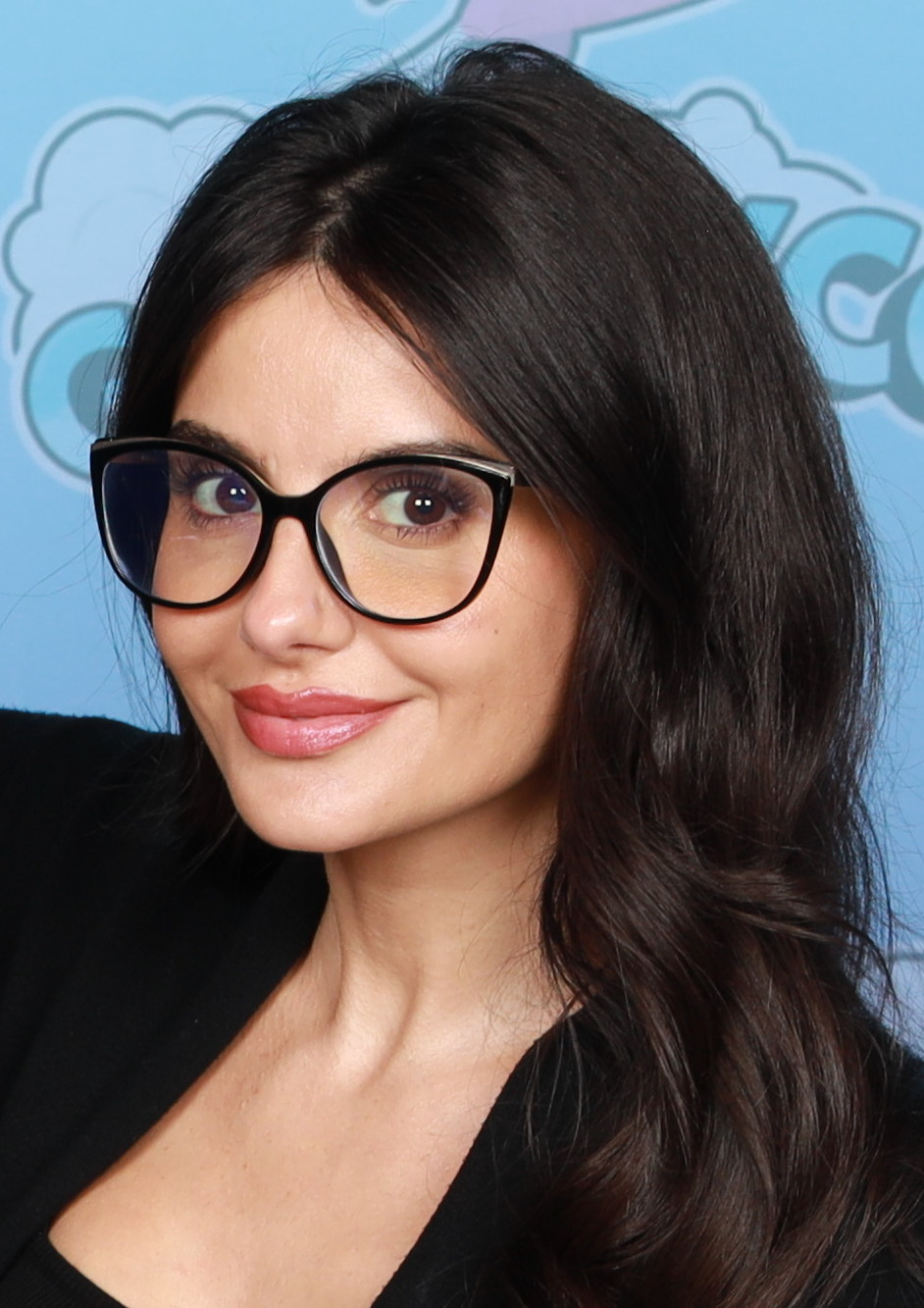
- Hoover in 2025
- Born: July 12, 1984 (age 42); Colbert, Washington, U.S.
- Education: Loyola Marymount University
- Occupation: Actress
- Years active: 2006–present
- Known for: Happy Endings; How I Met Your Mother

Mikaela Hoover (born July 12, 1984) is an American actress. She frequently collaborates with the director James Gunn, appearing in his films Super (2010), Guardians of the Galaxy (2014), The Suicide Squad (2021), and Superman (2025). She voices and does the face capture for Tony Tony Chopper in the second season of Netflix's live-action One Piece adaptation.

== Early life ==
Mikaela was born to Frank and Nancy Hoover (née Mehrizi) on July 12, 1984, in Colbert, Washington. Her father is of Italian and German descent and her mother is Iranian-American. She started taking dance classes at the age of two and starred in school plays and appeared in local commercials as a child. She was accepted to Loyola Marymount University's theatre program in Los Angeles and graduated with her bachelor's degree in theatre.

== Career ==
Hoover made her acting debut in 2007 with a role in the independent film Frank. She later booked a leading part in the web series Sorority Forever (2008). Around the same time, she auditioned for director James Gunn and appeared in his project Humanzee! (2008). This led to her being cast in the lead role of the Gunn and Peter Safran–produced Xbox series Sparky & Mikaela.

In 2010, Hoover began appearing in American television productions, including a guest role on How I Met Your Mother. That same year, she played a supporting role in Gunn's dark comedy film Super (2010).

She went on to make guest appearances on several sitcoms and comedy series. In 2011, she portrayed Jackie in two episodes of Happy Endings, and in 2012 she appeared in an episode of Anger Management. In 2013, she guest-starred in Two and a Half Men and The League, followed by an appearance on Saint George in 2014.

Hoover continued her collaborations with James Gunn, appearing as Nova Prime's assistant in Guardians of the Galaxy (2014). She later played Raziya Memarian in The Belko Experiment (2016), produced by Gunn.

In 2017, her television work included single-episode roles in 2 Broke Girls, The Guest Book, and Lucifer. She returned to feature films with supporting appearances in The Suicide Squad (2021) and the comedy Guest House (2020). That same year, she was part of the main cast of the Netflix romantic comedy Holidate. She followed this with another starring role in Netflix's Love Hard (2021).

Hoover was later cast as Cat Grant in James Gunn's Superman for DC Studios.

In 2025, it was announced that she had joined the main cast for the second season of Netflix's series One Piece, providing the voice of Tony Tony Chopper. The season aired in 2026. In August 2026, Hoover was announced to be reprising her DC Studios role as Cat Grant in the HBO series The People v. Gorilla Grodd.

== Filmography ==
Film & television
Year	Film	Role	Notes
2006	SamHas7Friends	Cami	Web series, 3 episodes
2007	Frank	Heather	
2008	Casanovas	Actress #1	Episode: "Hollywood Heartburn"
2008	Sorority Forever	Madison Westerbrook	Web series, main cast
2008	Sparky & Mikaela	Mikaela	Episode: "Pilot"
2008	Humanzee!	Margo	Episode: "Pilot"
2009	PG Porn	Julie	Web series, Episode: "Helpful Bus"
2009	Lost Dream	Mackenzie	
2010	G33K & G4M3R Girls	Jenna	Music video parody by Team Unicorn
2010	Super	Holly	
2010	How I Met Your Mother	Stacey	Episode: "Baby Talk"
2011	2 Man 3 Way		Short film
2011	Happy Endings	Jackie	2 episodes
2011	Fleshlightning	Madison	Short film
2012	Anger Management	Daytona	2 episodes
2013	Two and a Half Men	Morgan	Episode: "Big Episode: Someone Stole a Spoon"
2013	The League	Taco's Girl	Episode: "Chalupa vs. The Cutlet"
2014	Back in the Day	Tifficult	
2014	Saint George	Chloe	Episode: "Won't Get Fooled Again"
2014	Cuz-Bros	Karissa	TV movie
2014	Guardians of the Galaxy	Nova Prime's Assistant	
2016	The Belko Experiment	Raziya Memarian	
2017	2 Broke Girls	Jessica	Episode: "And The Baby And Other Things"
2017	Lucifer	Esther	Episode: "Chloe Does Lucifer"
2017	The Guest Book	Bethany	Episode: "Story Three"
2018	Blacked Out	Suzy	Short film
2018	Bubble	Sunday	Short film
2019	Airplane Mode	Claire	
2020	Holidate	Annie	
2020	Guest House	Taylor	
2021	The Suicide Squad	Camila	
2021	Love Hard	Chelsea	
2023	Guardians of the Galaxy Vol. 3	Floor the Rabbit	Voice role and motion-capture
2025	Duster	Adrienne Barbeau	Episode: "Suspicious Minds"
2025	Superman	Cat Grant	
2026	One Piece	Tony Tony Chopper	Voice and performance capture, main cast (season 2–present)
2026	Beef	Ava	Recurring cast (season 2)
2026	Lego One Piece	Tony Tony Chopper	Voice, main cast
TBA	The People v. Gorilla Grodd	Cat Grant	Main role; Filming
