= Summer Heat =

Summer Heat may refer to:

- Summer Heat (1968 film), a Hong Kong film directed by Kō Nakahira
- Summer Heat (1987 film), an American film directed by Michie Gleason
- Summer Heat (2006 film), a Filipino film directed by Brillante Mendoza
- Summer Heat (2008 film), a Dutch film directed by Monique van de Ven
- Summer Heat (TV series), a 2004 Hong Kong TV series
- Prom Queen: Summer Heat, 2007 American mini-web series
- Summer Heat Beach Volleyball, 2003 beach volleyball video game
- Heat wave, prolonged period of hot summer weather
