= Emlyn Morinelli McFarland =

American actress

- Born: Emlyn Elisabeth Morinelli; Ardmore, Pennsylvania, U.S.
- Education: Emerson College (BFA)
- Occupations: Actress; voice-over artist
- Years active: 1999–present
- Children: 2
- Website: www.visitemlyn.com

Emlyn Elisabeth Morinelli McFarland is a New York–based American actress and voice-over artist, who has provided voices for several prominent anime titles and has also provided voice work in television commercials.

== Career ==
McFarland has provided various voices for many characters in anime, including the Pokémon series where she voiced Officer Jenny and Zoey, and the Odex Singaporean English dub of One Piece, where she voiced Tony Tony Chopper.

McFarland has also provided voice overs in many television commercials and promos, including Hanes, Revlon, Trip Advisor, Royal Caribbean, Dunkin' Donuts and Nintendo.

Outside of voice acting, she has also performed in various theater productions and has also studied and performed in improv and sketch comedy.

== Personal life ==
McFarland is married and has two daughters, Adelaide and Isabelle.

== Filmography ==
=== Live-action ===
==== Film ====
List of live-action acting performances in films
| Year | Title | Role | Notes | Source |
|---|---|---|---|---|
| 2016 | Split | Customer at restaurant | | |

==== Television ====
List of live-action acting performances in television shows
| Year | Title | Role | Notes | Source |
|---|---|---|---|---|
| 2012–14 | Deadly Affairs | Cynthia | | |
| 2012 | Turning Point | Liz | TV pilot | |
| 2012 | Come to My House | Host | | |
| 2014 | Veep | Child Wrangler | Ep. "Clovis" | |
| 2014 | House of Cards | Lieutenant | Ep. "Chapter 17" | |

=== Voice roles ===
==== Film ====
List of voice-over performances in films
| Year | Title | Role | Notes | Source |
|---|---|---|---|---|
| 2006 | Impy's Island | Impy | HanWay Films dub | |
| 2008 | Impy's Wonderland | Impy | HanWay Films dub | |

==== Anime ====
List of voice-over performances in anime
| Year | Title | Role | Notes | Source |
|---|---|---|---|---|
| 2000–02 | UFO Baby | Bow Meow | | |
| 2002 | Haibane Renmei (as Alies Grises) | Rakka | Odex dub | |
| 2003–10, 2022–present | Pokémon | Officer Jenny, Zoey, others | | |
| 2004 | One Piece | Tony Tony Chopper, Tashigi, Dr. Kureha | Odex dub | |
| 2006 | Pokémon Mystery Dungeon | Charmander | | |

==== Animation ====
List of voice-over performances in animation
| Year | Title | Role | Notes | Source |
|---|---|---|---|---|
| 2006 | Wonder Pets | Mother Cow, Mother Skunk | Ep. "Save the Cow/Save the Skunk" | |
