= The Tornante Company =

American investment firm

The Tornante Company, LLC
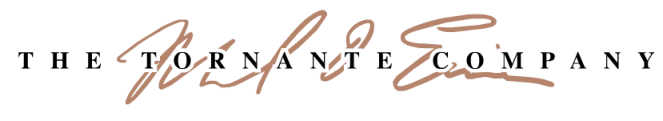
- Type: Private
- Industry: Private equity; Venture capital
- Founded: 2005; 21 years ago
- Founder: Michael Eisner
- Headquarters: Beverly Hills, California, U.S.
- Key people: Michael Eisner (Chairman); Val Cohen (General Counsel); Noel Bright (President, Tornante Television); David Shall (COO and General Counsel, Tornante Television); Adam Londy (Head of Development, Tornante Television)
- Owner: Michael Eisner
- Subsidiaries: Omaze; Topps (2007-2022); Tornante Television; Vuguru (50%)
- Website: tornante.com

The Tornante Company, LLC is an American privately held investment firm founded in 2005 and owned by former Paramount Pictures and The Walt Disney Company CEO Michael Eisner. Tornante invests in, acquires, and operates media and entertainment companies.

The company’s name came from when Eisner was bicycling around Italy, he saw a signpost that inspired the name Tornante for his company. Tornante means "hairpin turn" in Italian.

== History ==
The Tornante Company was founded by Michael Eisner in 2005, after he left The Walt Disney Company.

In 2006, Tornante formed Vuguru production company. The company made a $12.5 million venture funding round investment in Veoh in April 2006. Tornante purchased Team Baby Entertainment, a maker of infants and toddlers sports-related DVDs in June 2006. On March 5, 2007, the company and Madison Dearborn Partners purchased Topps for $385 million. Tornante planned to have Team Baby merge with Topps.

Partnerships and media projects (2015–2017)

In June 2015, Tornante Co. formed Tornante-Sinclair LLC, a TV production company, with Sinclair TV Group. Eisner's company signed in November 2015 a worldwide distribution deal with Universal Pictures to release the firm's self-funded slate of films.

Portsmouth Football Club acquisition and investment

In August 2017, Tornante closed on the purchase of the Portsmouth Football Club for an undisclosed deal; however, BBC reported that Eisner had offered £5.67 million "and will invest an extra £10m."

Following Tornante's acquisition of Portsmouth Football Club, the team had recently been promoted from EFL League Two to League One. Since the takeover, the club has achieved promotion to the EFL Championship, with Tornante reportedly investing over $35 million in the club.

In 2021, Portsmouth FC purchased the freehold of its Hilsea training ground for £3 million under Tornante's ownership.

As of 2024, Portsmouth FC, under Tornante's ownership, operated with one of the lowest wage bills in the EFL Championship and emphasized financial sustainability.

2024 - present

In 2024 Tornante and Madison Dearborn Partners sold Topps in three parts for a total of approximately $1.35 billion, a 3.55x multiple on the original investment.

In 2026, Tornante partnered with comedian Nate Bargatze to produce Nateville, an adult animated series. The same year, Michael Eisner invested in video game company Delphi Interactive, which works with intellectual property owners and game developers on licensed titles as well as FIFA and 007 Franchise partners.

== Holdings ==
=== Current ===
- AirTime
- Clique Media (now Clique Brands)
- Metaverse
- Omaze
- Portsmouth Football Club
- Rad
- Spark Neuro
- Tornante-Sinclair LLC (50%) a joint venture TV production company with Sinclair TV Group for court shows, comedy programs, game shows and talk shows in first-run syndicated
- Tornante Television, Los Angeles based subsidiary overseeing Tornante-Sinclair via Tornante co-president, Lauren Corrao. The unit also produces the adult animated comedies BoJack Horseman, Tuca & Bertie, Undone and Long Story Short, and in conjunction with Trifecta Entertainment and Media the syndicated court reality show Judge Faith.
- Vuguru (2006–) production company with backing from Rogers Media of Canada

=== Media and television ===
- Tornante Television - Producer of several adult animated series including:
  - BoJack Horseman - Winner of multiple awards including Critics' Choice Television Award for Best Animated Series, and ranked the best animated series of all time by IndieWire.
  - Tuca & Bertie
  - Undone
  - Long Story Short
  - Judge Faith (in conjugation with Trifecta Entertainment and Media)

=== Other past productions ===
- Tornante has also produced or co-produced:
  - Glenn Martin, DDS
  - The Booth at the End
  - NOS4A2
  - Crime Exposé with Nancy O'Dell
  - Scrambled Up
  - Back on Topps

=== Former ===
- Topps (October 2007 – January 2022)
- Team Baby Entertainment (June 2006) a maker of infants and toddlers sports-related DVDs, which merged with Topps
- Veoh (stake) April 2006 – April 7, 2010
