= Ed Bassmaster =

American YouTuber and television actor

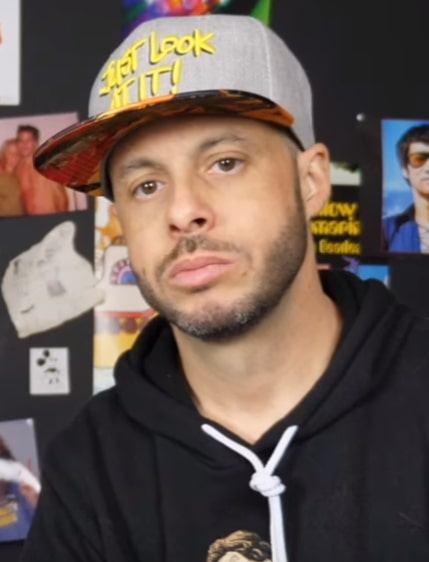
- Bassmaster in 2019
- Born: February 4, 1973 (age 53); Philadelphia, Pennsylvania, U.S.

YouTube information
- Channel: Ed Bassmaster
- Years active: 2006–present
- Genre: Prank
- Subscribers: 2.81 million
- Views: 972.9 million
- Last updated: May 3, 2025

Ed Bassmaster (born February 4, 1973) is an American YouTuber focused on prank comedy and playing many characters. He starred in the CMT reality-TV prank series, The Ed Bassmaster Show.

== Early life ==
Bassmaster was born in Northeast Philadelphia. He describes his mother as "half Italian, half Russian Jew", and his father is Puerto Rican who left the family when he was a toddler. He left high school in 10th grade.

== Career ==
Bassmaster began posting videos in 2006, and gained wide attention in 2015 with his and fellow YouTuber Jesse Wellens's faux surveillance video purporting to show the destruction of the Canadian hitchhiking robot hitchBOT, whose real-life destruction was not filmed. Some news organizations were fooled by the video.

During the YouTube Comedy Week live event in 2013, Skippy, one of Bassmaster's characters, went on stage unannounced and was kicked out of the event.

In January 2015, CMT's The Ed Bassmaster Show launched as a reality-TV series where his characters prank people as on YouTube. It premiered on April 14, 2016.

== Personal life ==
Bassmaster is a married father of four in Northeast Philadelphia.

== Filmography ==
=== Film ===
| Year | Film | Role | Notes |
|---|---|---|---|
| 2020 | Guest House | Sonny Days | |

=== Television ===
| Year | Film | Role | Notes |
|---|---|---|---|
| 2012 | Driver Rehab | Himself | |
| 2016– | The Ed Bassmaster Show | Himself | |
| 2020 | Guest House | Mud Yodel | |
