= Liz Katz =

American cosplayer, actress, and model

- Born: Elizabeth Katz; July 8, 1988 (age 38); Randolph, New Jersey, U.S.
- Occupations: Cosplayer, actress, model
- Years active: 2006–present
- Children: 4

Elizabeth Katz (born July 8, 1988) is an American cosplayer, actress and model.

== Early life ==
Katz was born on July 8, 1988, and raised in Randolph, New Jersey. She attributes her love of gaming to simply being how she was raised: "Growing up as a kid my father forced us to play table top games, miniature war-gaming... It was just something you did in my family". She is half-Jewish, and also celebrates Hanukkah and Passover.

Katz attended Randolph High School and cosplayed throughout her teens as a hobby. After a brief career in the adult film industry under the pseudonym Risi Simms, Katz created a Facebook page under her real name and began posting her cosplay work. In 2014, Katz began playing video games live on Twitch.

== Cosplay career ==
Katz began cosplaying professionally after winning IGN’s Best Cosplay at WonderCon 2012. In 2014, Katz began playing video games live on Twitch and posting gaming videos on her YouTube channel.

In 2013, Katz undertook a crowdfunding effort to fund a cosplay outfit, raising US$4,690 (equivalent to $6,482 in 2025), starting from her original goal of US$650 (equivalent to $898 in 2025). This prompted a debate in some circles on the use of crowdfunding for cosplay.

Playboy ranked Katz as the fifth sexiest cosplayer in 2014. FHM ranked her as the fourth sexiest cosplayer in 2016. Katz has since featured prominently at many cons and other events.

Katz has appeared in a number of Sam Macaroni's works and had over 1,200,000 Instagram followers as of June 2022.

== Personal life ==
Katz first gave birth to a son when she was twenty. Twelve years after her first child, she became pregnant once more, after entering into a relationship with YouTuber H2O Delirious. She gave birth to a daughter in September 2020, and to another daughter in December 2021. In December 2025, Katz had given birth to her fourth child.

== Filmography ==
=== Film ===
Year	Film	Role
2005	The Crow: Wicked Prayer	Cat Girl #2
2018	Funny Story	Elven Princess
2018	Game Over, Man!	Girl at party
2020	Guest House	Carrie

=== Television ===
Year	Series	Role	Appeared in
2011	The Guild	Convention attendee	Season 5, Episodes 4 and 9
2012	Holliston	Sexy Horror Fan	Season 1, Episodes 9
2013–2014	Super Power Beat Down	Cortana (Ep 6 and 11), Catwoman (Ep 8)	Season 1, Episodes 6, 8 and 11

=== Video games ===
Year	Game	Role
2019	Borderlands 3	Bloodshine
2023	House Party	Liz Katz

=== Music videos ===
Year	Title	Artist	Role
2012	"Diamonds"	Rihanna	Rioter
2012	"Remembrance"	Before the Mourning	Lead Girl
2018	"Hundred Pound Hammer"	Jason C. Miller	
