= Taryn Southern =

American actress

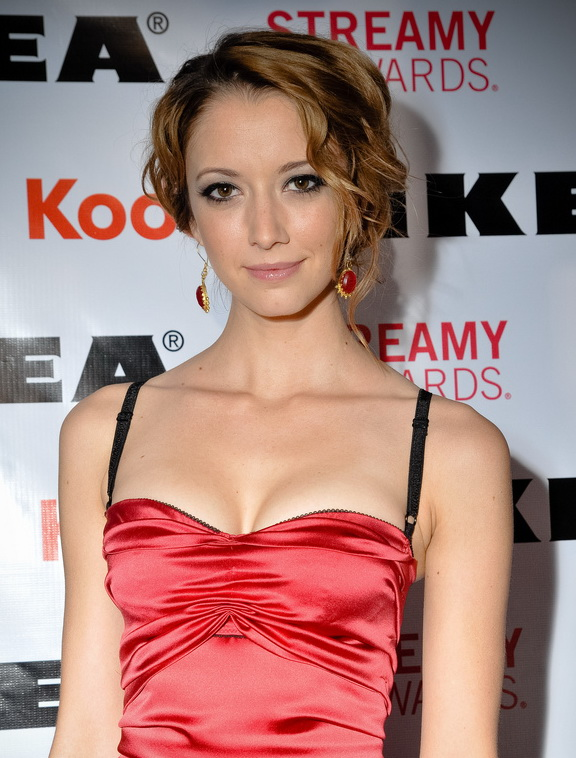
- Taryn Southern at the 2010 Streamys
- Born: 1986/1987 (age 39–40)
- Education: University of Miami (BS, BA)
- Occupations: Tech artist; advisor; filmmaker; public speaker
- Years active: 2004–present
- Website: www.tarynsouthern.com

Taryn Southern (born 1986/1987) is an American public speaker, artist, and brand strategist who works with emerging technologies. She was formerly known for her work as a TV host, actress and YouTuber.

== Early life ==
Southern grew up in Wichita, Kansas, and landed her first starring role in a pre-Broadway theatrical production at the age of 10. As a teenager, she co-hosted a regional teen talk show for WB Kansas . At 20, Southern graduated from the University of Miami, earning a B.S. in anthropology and a B.A. in journalism. While in school, she competed in American Idol and received a grant to travel to Peru to study the shamanic use of ayahuasca among rainforest communities.

== Career ==
=== Emerging technology ===
In 2017, Southern received a grant from the Google Creator Lab to create experimental VR content. One piece, New World, won AT&T's 2020 Film Award and another, Life Support, was nominated for a Streamy Award. Southern was also chosen to be an ambassador for The Geena Davis Institute Gender in Media #ShesGotDrive campaign to promote female voices in media.

Southern's immersive content work led her to begin producing music with AI-based musical composition tools. In 2018, she released a music album titled I AM AI, where the instrumental backing music was generated using a variety of AI-based tools including Amper, an open source product which allows users to create music based on user generated inputs, IBM Watson Beat, Google Magenta and AIVA. Her first single, "Break Free", was released in August 2017, and features music generated using Amper. Her song "New World" was tokenized using blockchain technology to enable hundreds of collaborators to split backend royalties on sales and streams of the track. The album received international attention, and radio play in the US.

In April 2019, Southern debuted her first full-length feature documentary, I AM HUMAN, which explored the co-evolution of the human brain and technology. I AM HUMAN had its worldwide premiere at the 2019 Tribeca Film Festival in New York and was co-directed and produced by Southern. The Winner of four Best Feature awards following its premiere, I AM HUMAN chronicled the journey of three real-world pioneers with implantable brain-computer interfaces. I AM HUMAN won numerous awards including Best of the Fest at the 2019 El Dorado Film Festival, Audience Choice for Best Feature at the 2019 Eastern Oregon Film Festival, Outstanding First Feature at the Tallgrass Film Festival, Best Feature at Other Worlds Austin and Best Director at the Oslo Film Festival. I AM HUMAN was released on March 10, 2020 on video-on-demand platforms.

=== Digital media and YouTube ===
On July 2, 2007, Southern released her first YouTube video, Hott4Hill, which garnered more than a million views and appeared on FOX and MSNBC's Hardball with Chris Matthews.

Shortly after, Southern was appointed the face of AT&T U-Verse's entertainment channel and Cosmopolitan's first daily online series. In addition, she starred in the first online series for The WB, Sorority Forever.

In 2009, Southern wrote/produced her first comedic musical web series, which later sold to MTV as a half-hour comedy pilot, with David Zuckerman as co-writer/executive producer.

In 2013, Southern released a musical comedy album, which reached #20 on the iTunes comedy chart and was recognized by Billboard. The song “Crush”, which was on the album, made it to the Top 100 in radio play that August. Southern ultimately released more than 50 original songs and covers as well as an 80's inspired album, Flashback Friday.

Southern launched her YouTube channel in 2012 by releasing one video per week for a year. In 2014, Southern's YouTube Channel was listed on New Media Rockstars Top 100 Channels, ranked at #52. As of 2015, she had more than 450,000 subscribers.

By 2017, Southern had stopped posting regular content on her YouTube channel. She cited the YouTube algorithm as problematic for the digital community, and a desire to focus on other creative endeavors and experiments with emerging technology.

=== TV hosting, radio, acting, singing ===
When Southern was seventeen, she was part of American Idol season three's Top 50. She went on to host and executive produce DirecTV's first original series, Project My World, before landing other jobs in the entertainment industry and building a YouTube channel. She was later a live correspondent on the US version of The X Factor., a correspondent on Discovery Channel's Shark After Dark Live, which earned the #1 ratings spot in its time slot. Southern was later hired to continue her role as correspondent for Naked After Dark on Discovery Channel, a companion late-night show to Naked and Afraid. She also debuted a series with Marriott that was later renewed for a second season, and launched a digital talk show with Maker Studios. The series, which launched in 2015 and 2016, was an exploration of internet culture, and featured guests ranging from celebrity/science enthusiast Seth MacFarlane and King Bach to psychedelic advocate Zach Leary and activist musician Kate Nash.

Southern's television acting roles included: a recurring role in the fifth season of the CBS comedy series Rules of Engagement, as well as guest starring on New Girl, American Dad!, The League and Guys with Kids.

== Personal life ==
In 2019, Southern was diagnosed with stage 3 breast cancer. She completed a year of treatment in the summer of 2020, and has raised funds for an organization that provides cold cap medical treatments to young women with breast cancer.

== Videography ==
=== Film/TV ===
Year	Title	Role	Notes
2007	Project My World	Taryn	Nine episode documentary
2007–2008	The Heavy Show	Various characters	
2008	Senior Skip Day	Isha	movie
2008	Sorority Forever	Taryn Monaghan	31 episodes
2009	Woke Up Dead	Debbie	
2010	Pound of Flesh	Dyonesia Cosa	movie
2010	Rules of Engagement	Allison	Guest Star in 5 episodes
2010	The Temp Life	Nancy Roder	8 episodes
2010	Battle Los Angeles	Reporter on beach	movie
2011–2012	It's Fred	Judy Munsley, Fred's Mom	9 episodes
2012	New Girl	Megan	Guest appearance in Season 2, Episode 3 "Fluffer"
2012	Guys with Kids	Erica	Guest appearance in Season 1, Episode 12 "Marny's Dad"
2014	Last Man Standing	Rachel	Guest appearance in Season 3, Episode 15 "Tasers"

== Discography ==
- On My Face (2012)
- Flashback Friday (2015)
- I Love You, But (2016)
- Break Free (2017)
- I AM AI (2018)
