= Colbert, Washington =

Unincorporated community in Washington, United States

- Unincorporated community
- Location within Washington (state)
- Coordinates: 47°49′36″N 117°20′31″W
- Country: United States
- State: Washington
- County: Spokane
- Elevation: 1,841 ft (561 m)
- Time zone: UTC-8 (Pacific (PST))
  - Summer (DST): UTC-7 (PDT)
- ZIP code: 99005
- Area code: 509
- GNIS feature ID: 1512105

Colbert (/ˈkoʊlbərt/) is an unincorporated community in Spokane County, Washington, United States. The town is on U.S. Route 2, north of the city of Spokane. Colbert was originally called Dragoon; the present name is for Harry Colbert, an early postmaster. A post office was established as Dragoon in 1890, and the name was changed to Colbert in 1902.

== Education ==
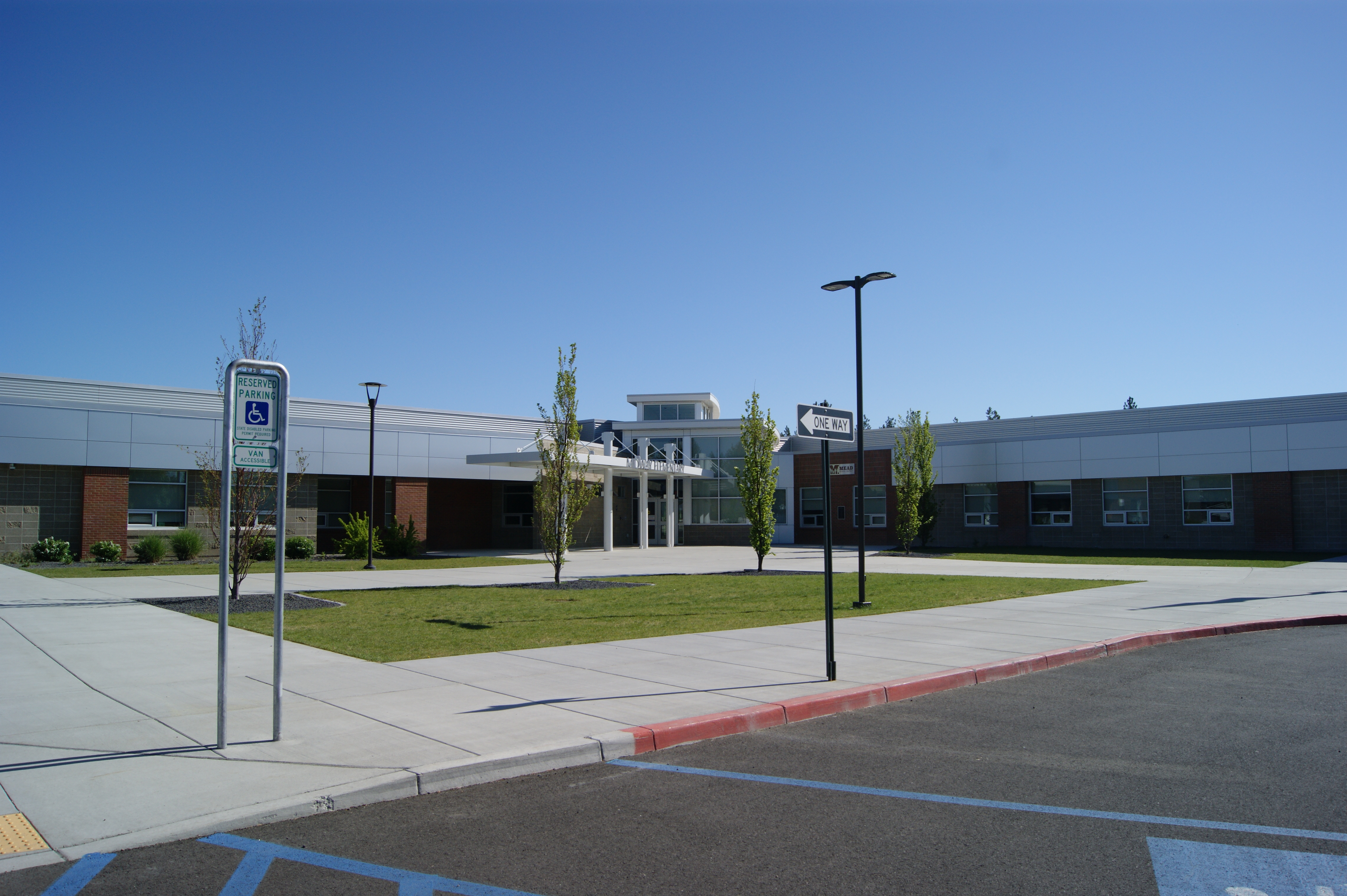
Midway Elementary School

Children who live in Colbert attend either Colbert Elementary School on Greenbluff Road or Midway Elementary School, both of which, along with Shiloh Hills Elementary and Meadow Ridge Elementary, feed into the newly formed Mountainside Middle School (previously Mead Middle School), which feeds into Mount Spokane High School. These schools are part of the Mead School District.

Colbert Elementary School has about 600 students enrolled, with 25 classroom teachers, 11 specialists, and 26 support staff.

The K-12 private school Northwest Christian is located in Colbert.

== Recreation ==
The main recreational facility in Colbert is Bidwell Park. This park features a pool with water slides, a small playground, a tennis court, a basketball court, and a volleyball court with sand. There is a parking lot adjacent to the pool and a road with parking that goes between two baseball fields.

== Notable residents ==
- Mikaela Hoover, actress
