= Tony Tony Chopper =

Fictional character from One Piece

- One Piece character
- Chopper in his most common form, as a human-reindeer hybrid as illustrated by Eiichiro Oda in the color spread of Chapter 1000
- First appearance: One Piece chapter 134: "Dr. Kureha" (Weekly Shōnen Jump No. 23, May 8, 2000)
- Created by: Eiichiro Oda
- Voiced by: Japanese; Ikue Otani (ep. 83-253, 264+); Kazue Ikura (ep. 254-263); English; Lisa Ortiz (4Kids); Brina Palencia (FUNimation); Emlyn Morinelli (Singapore, Odex); Mikaela Hoover (live action series)
- Birthday: December 24

In-universe information
- Alias: "Cotton Candy Lover"
- Species: Reindeer/Human
- Gender: Male
- Occupation: Pirate (Doctor)
- Relatives: Hiriluk (surrogate father); Kureha (surrogate mother)
- Affiliations: Straw Hat Pirates (Doctor); Straw Hat Grand Fleet; Foxy Pirates (Former); Ninja-Pirate-Mink-Samurai Alliance (Disbanded)
- Age: 15 (debut); 17 (after the timeskip)
- Devil Fruit: Human-Human Fruit (ヒトヒトの実, Hito Hito no Mi)
- Bounties: 1000 (current); 100 (second); 50 (first)

Tony Tony Chopper (Japanese: トニートニー・チョッパー, Hepburn: Tonī Tonī Choppā), otherwise known as "Cotton Candy Lover", is a fictional character in the manga series and media franchise One Piece created by Eiichiro Oda. The character made his first appearance in the 134th chapter of the series, which was first published in Japan in Shueisha's Weekly Shōnen Jump magazine on May 8, 2000. He is the sixth member of the Straw Hat Pirates and the fifth to join, serving as their doctor. Chopper is frequently featured on official merchandise, serving as a mascot for the series.

The power of the Zoan-type Human-Human Fruit (ヒトヒトの実, Hito Hito no Mi) provides him with the ability to transform into a full-sized reindeer or a reindeer-human hybrid.^{[ch. 140]} A drug he calls "Rumble Ball" (ランブル・ボール, Ranburu Bōru) enables him to perform even more transformations for a short time.^{[ch. 149]}^{[ch. 1014]}

Rejected by his herd because of his blue nose and eating the Devil Fruit, Chopper is rescued by Drum Island's quack doctor Doctor Hiriluk. While developing a potion to create cherry blossoms when in contact with snow, Chopper is heartbroken when Hiriluk falls ill with a deadly disease. After Hiriluk's death, Doctor Kureha takes him in as his mentor. After the Straw Hats arrive at Drum Island and take Chopper with them, Kureha uses Hiriluk's potion to turn the snowy sky into cherry blossoms, fulfilling Hiriluk's life mission. When complimented, Chopper acts flustered and sometimes yells and calls them things such as jerk, and other things at the person who complimented him to stop trying to make him happy.^{[ch. 140]} A running gag within the series is when other characters mistake him as a Tanuki, and he angrily corrects them, pointing out that he is a Tonakai (Japanese for "Reindeer").

== About ==
=== Personality and Characteristics ===
With Chopper's back story, Oda wanted to illustrate that one need not be blood-related to be considered family. When asked by a fan what the nationalities of the members of the Straw Hat Pirates would be if One Piece was set in the real world, Oda replied that Chopper would be Canadian.

Chopper is initially ostracized as a monster. Chopper is very naïve, and has a tendency to believe anything told to him, even the outrageously fictitious, exaggerated lies of Usopp. Chopper loves to be complimented and is incapable of hiding his feelings. After the time-skip he embraces his status because he wants to be a "monster for Luffy."

=== Abilities ===
The power of the Zoan-type Human-Human Fruit (ヒトヒトの実, Hito Hito no Mi) provides Tony Tony Chopper with the ability to transform into three forms: a humanoid being, human-reindeer hybrid or his default reindeer form.^{[ch. 140]} In addition to his normal transformations, Chopper developed a drug he calls the Rumble Ball (ランブル・ボール, Ranburu Bōru), having the shape of round yellow pills, which allows him four additional transformations to use temporarily. Although the primary effects of the rumble ball only last three minutes,^{[ch. 149]} Chopper cannot consume a second ball for six hours without adverse effects, mainly the loss of control over his transformations during the three minutes of his second Rumble Ball.^{[ch. 406]} If Chopper consumes three Rumble Balls within six hours, he grows to monstrous proportions and loses all self control and consciousness.^{[ch. 407]} This form, known as Monster Point, is extremely powerful, but also has the adverse effect of draining Chopper's life force. After the two-year timeskip Chopper is able to transform into six forms without a rumble ball and can use a rumble ball to control his Monster Point.^{[ch. 645]}^{[ch. 646]} Later with the help of their enemy and temporary prisoner Caesar Clown, Chopper was able to improve the formula and lengthen the effects of the Rumble Ball ten-fold to thirty minutes at a time,^{[ch. 1014]} albeit with new side-effects of Chopper temporarily shrinking down to an infant-like form, known as Baby Geezer, with antiqued speech.^{[ch. 1017]}

Since Chopper is an animal who ate the Human-Human Fruit, he can converse with other animals and humans alike.^{[ch. 154]}

=== Portrayals ===
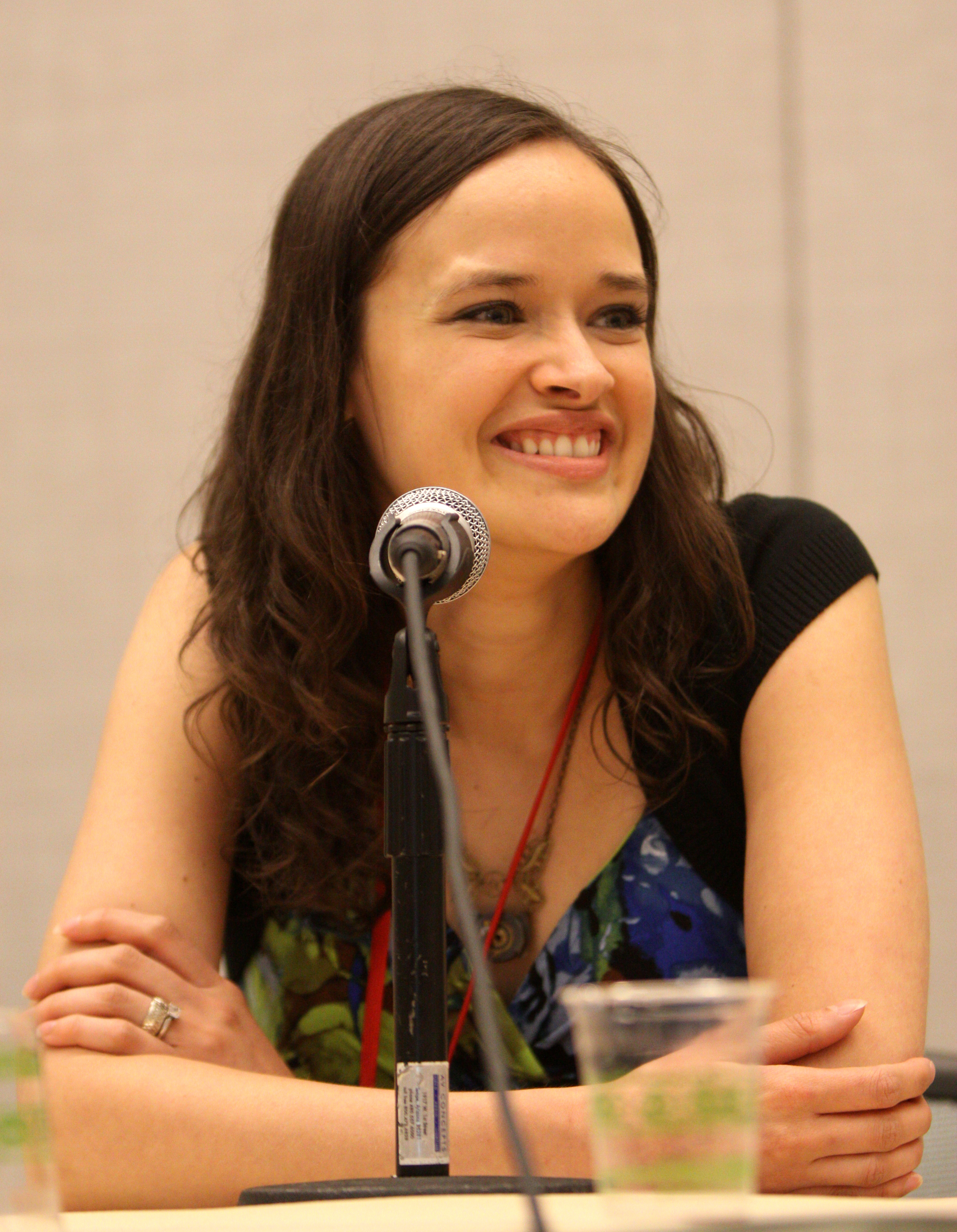
Brina Palencia voices Tony Tony Chopper in the Funimation English dub of the anime series.

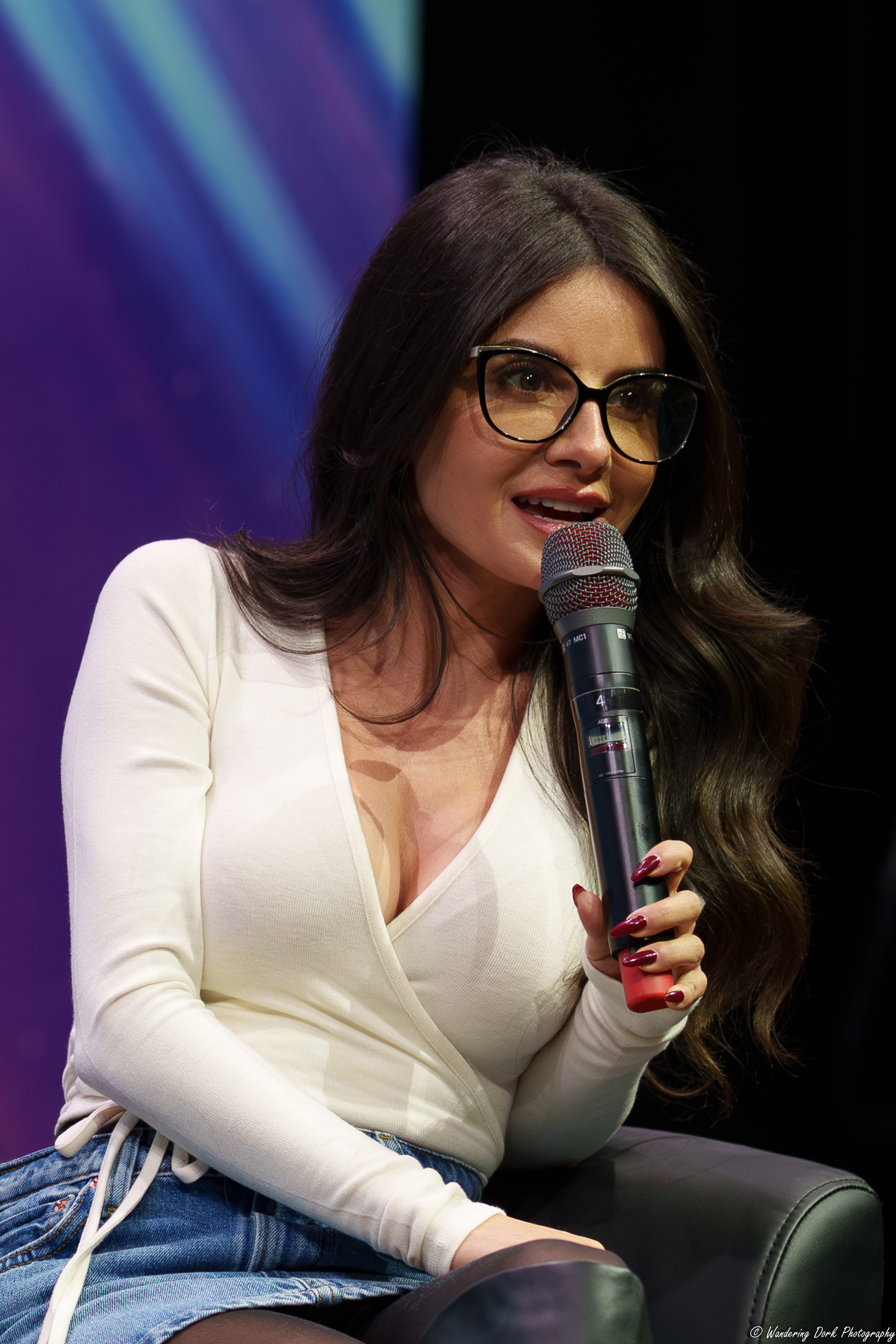
Mikaela Hoover voices and performs the face capture for Tony Tony Chopper in the live-action series.

In the original Japanese anime of One Piece, Tony Tony Chopper's main voice actress is Ikue Ōtani. Kazue Ikura voiced Tony Tony Chopper for episodes 254–263. Brina Palencia voices Chopper in the English Funimation dub. Lisa Ortiz voiced him in the 4Kids Entertainment English dub. Emlyn Morinelli voices Chopper in Singapore's Odex dub.

In the live-action adaptation, Chopper is voiced by American actress Mikaela Hoover, who also does the face capture for him. Additionally, N’kone Mametja acts as the on-set proxy for Chopper's hybrid form, while Gavin Gomes acts as the suit performer for Chopper's Heavy Point.

== Appearances ==
=== In One Piece ===
Chopper grew up on the winter island Drum, where he was an outcast among reindeer due to his blue nose. He ate the Human-Human Fruit (ヒトヒトの実, Hito Hito no Mi), giving him the ability to speak, think, and transform into a human. This ability further alienated him from the other reindeer, and he was rejected by the herd. He grew up an outcast until taken in by the fake doctor Hiriluk, a former thief, who accepts Chopper as his son and instills within him his initial passion for medicine. After Hiriluk's death, Chopper becomes Dr. Kureha's assistant and learns her medical knowledge.

Luffy tries "to convince Chopper to join the crew as the ship's Doctor". A frightened Chopper continues to give Luffy the slip and later explains he can't be part of the crew because he is a monster. Luffy tells Chopper to shut up and come with them regardless, which moves Chopper to tears as he has finally found real friends, people who aren't afraid of him.

Chopper is the doctor of the crew and has knowledge of medicine and medical drugs, as well as the preparation of remedies and ointments from regular fruits, roots and vegetables found on most islands. Most of this he learned during his apprenticeship under Dr. Kureha or from his time at the Birdie Kingdom.

Chopper stands at a height of 90 centimetres (2 ft 11 in) and weighs 20 kg (44 lb) in his Brain Point form. He possesses extraordinary genius-level intelligence, excelling in medicine, surgery, and pharmacology. His power ranking is classified as Class A, with attack potency ranging from Large Building to City Block level. His speed varies from Supersonic+ to Hypersonic+, and his lifting strength is rated between Class 5 and Class M. In battle, Chopper is an expert fighter who leverages his transformative abilities to gain advantages. He has enhanced stamina at an exceptional human level and durability comparable to City Block level. However, his primary weakness is that he becomes immobilized if more than half of his body is submerged in water.

Chopper found a genuine feeling of family after joining the Straw Hats, where his friends encourage him as a person and as a doctor. He treats injuries and illnesses and creates antidotes in emergency situations because of his medical knowledge and charming demeanor, which makes him a vital member of the crew. During the Punk Hazard arc, one of his greatest accomplishments was developing an antidote to protect youngsters Caesar Clown experimented on.

=== In other media ===
Chopper has appeared in other media besides the manga and its television anime adaptation. He is featured in most of the One Piece films starting with Movie 3: Chopper's Kingdom of Strange Animal Island, where he is the main character. He is also the main character in the ninth movie, which is a retelling of the storyline during which he was introduced.

Chopper has appeared in many One Piece licensed electronic video games. Though in the game, One Piece: Grand Battle he is not labeled as a Straw Hat character, and has no alliance in the game. Though like the rest of the Straw Hat's, he has unlockable costumes outside of his alternate colors. In One Piece: Grand Adventure he is aligned with the Straw Hats. He is also a support character in Jump Super Stars. In 2006, he is featured in the Dragon Ball/One Piece/Naruto crossover game Battle Stadium D.O.N. as a playable character.

Chopper was seen in Bokusatsu Tenshi Dokuro-chan when Sakura mentions "reindeer who are doctors" and other things from anime, while he was freaking out in a forest. He also appears twice in the Webcomic VG Cats. Chopper and other characters also appeared in Cross Epoch, a crossover between One Piece and Dragon Ball Z.

In the live-action Netflix adaptation, Mikaela Hoover provides the voice and motion capture performance for Chopper, with N'kone Mametja serving as the on-set proxy and Gavin Gomes portraying the supersized "heavy point" transformation. The visual-effects company Framestore adapted Chopper's design for the live-action series, supervised by Victor Scalise. Oda advised the production team to approach the character's design as a stuffed toy rather than a realistic animal, to avoid an uncanny valley effect.

=== In merchandise ===
There have been various pieces of merchandise released for Chopper over the years. Various plush figures have been based on him, including many season based ones, as well as an assortment of others. There have also been many figures released of Chopper. Additionally, there have been many other pieces of merchandise based on Chopper such as cushions, clothing, towels, key chains, and clocks.

== Reception ==
=== Critical reception ===
Sean Cubillas of Screen Rant ranked Chopper third on a top ten list of the most adorable anthropomorphic anime animals, writing, "It makes sense that the best-selling manga of all time would also have one of the cutest, talking animal characters of all time. Though berated by humans as a monster and even as an outcast by other reindeer, Tony Tony Chopper hasn't become anything less than a friendly, welcome face for all the fans. It also helps that there's just a lot of One Piece merch centered around him." In a review, Cubillas writes "Tony Tony Chopper on design alone is already plenty iconic. He's meant to be the mascot for the series and after seeing all of the One Piece merch with his face on it, he's done a pretty good job. The scene to define him, however, comes in his backstory. After tragically losing Dr. Hiluluk to a political assassination, his own poison mushroom soup, and an undisclosed terminal illness, Chopper runs to Dr. Kureha's office waving Hiluluk's pirate flag. He begs the old woman to teach him, proclaiming that he wants to be a doctor that can cure any disease."

In another article, Cubillas uniquely gave Chopper two entries in his ranking of the series top ten running gags, noting "Part of the Cowardly Trio, Chopper is as up for a fight as Usopp with an actual illness. Unfortunately for him, he can't quite hide away … it's easy to understand why most characters who see him for the first time tend to think that he's a tanuki (or a raccoon dog). While Chopper has some kinship with other animals, he certainly doesn't like being mislabeled, particularly when this denotes him as the Straw Hat's pet and not as the talented doctor that he truly is."

An IGN review of the manga praised Chopper's character as one of the best in the series and said that he was able to be both touching and funny.

However, Chopper's status as a mascot met with criticism by both fans and critics, who view him as too stereotypical and insufficiently developed compared to the other Straw Hats. Dyler Crews wrote, "Even before Pikachu solidified the concept of a manga and anime franchise having an adorable mascot in the '90s, the trope was already old hat. Looking to cash in on merchandising, Oda simplified Tony Tony Chopper's design to make the character resemble a plush toy. Although Oda didn't relegate Chopper to mascot status only, giving the character an essential job within the crew, Chopper's utility in the story has diminished as his marketability grew, Chopper is now often used for jokes or cute moments instead of playing a central role as the crew's doctor in important storylines .Having the voice actor behind Pikachu didn't help either.

Mikaela Hoover's performance as Chopper in the live-action series was met with critical acclaim, with Rafael Motamayor hailing Chopper as the standout of the second season. David Caballero lamented that due to the wide emotions that Chopper displays, the "CGI simply can't keep up, especially considering Hoover is acting her heart out in the voice department."

=== Popularity ===
Chopper ranked in the top ten during the second through seventh popularity polls. Chopper was the fourth most popular character in the second, third, and fourth Japanese popularity polls. He was ranked the seventh most popular character in the fifth and sixth Japanese popularity poll. In the first worldwide popularity poll, Chopper was ranked the sixteenth most-favorite character.

The denouement of Chopper's introduction arc was rated the ninth most heartbreaking scene in One Piece, and Chopper was involved in half of the top ten most heartbreaking scenes in the manga: the Going Merry's funeral, Robin saying she wants to live, the Straw Hats' departure, the Going Merry rescuing the Straw Hats, and the aforementioned denouement, when Kureha fulfills Hiriluk's dying wish by making Drum "bloom" like a Sakura tree. Jamie Lee Curtis said Chopper was her favorite character and that she was interested in playing Kureha, Chopper's mentor, in the live-action adaptation, although she ultimately did not play the character due to scheduling conflicts.

== See also ==
- Straw Hats
- List of One Piece characters

== Notes ==
- "One Piece v16". MangaLife. Archived from the original on December 19, 2008.
