= On My Face =

Studio album by Taryn Southern
- Released: October 12, 2012
- Recorded: 2008–12
- Genre: Comedy, pop
- Length: 38:11
- Language: English
- Label: Arkatone Music Group

Taryn Southern chronology
On My Face (2012)	Flashback Friday (2015)

On My Face is a 2012 musical comedy album by actress and singer Taryn Southern. Released on October 12, it is Southern's debut studio album. Taryn Southern, who was part of American Idol's third season's Top 50, first gained national attention with her musical comedy video Hot4Hill, which was released during the 2008 Presidential race.

== Background ==
Shortly after the success of Taryn Southern's first musical comedy video, Hot4Hill, she began working on a similarly-themed musical comedy album.

In 2010, Southern released the video for the album's first single, "Keep It In Your Pants" on YouTube. The song reached #20 on the iTunes comedy chart.

On October 12, 2012, Southern released the full-length album on various platforms including Amazon.com, Spotify and the iTunes Store.

The album consists of thirteen individual tracks either written or co-written by Taryn Southern.

== Promotion ==
In advance of her album's release, Taryn Southern announced on her website a contest to design the album's back cover. Following the theme of the album's title, entrants were to photoshop various items onto a picture of Taryn's face with the winner selected by YouTube viewers.

As part of the album's release, Southern announced that she would be releasing eight related videos on her YouTube channel. Furthermore, she announced that behind the scenes videos would be released exclusively on the Official Comedy YouTube channel.

Lastly, coinciding with the release of her album, Alloy Digital's new website Crushable announced that Taryn Southern would be hosting the site's first web series, Infamous with Taryn Southern, with video content related to her album.

All tracks from On My Face were removed from the artist's profiles in all distribution sources in January 2017.

== Track listing ==
No.	Title	Writer(s)	Producer(s)	Length
1.	"Internet Stalker"	Taryn Southern; Jordan Palmer	Palmer	3:17
2.	"I Think I Farted"	Southern; Palmer	Palmer; Will Forbes	2:43
3.	"Remarkable Vagina"	Southern; Julia Price; Ethan Carlson	Forbes	2:18
4.	"Just Google That Shit"	Southern; Palmer	Palmer	2:49
5.	"Where Is My Goat?"	Southern; Forbes; Andy Lange	Forbes	3:27
6.	"Bad Sex"	Southern; Forbes	Forbes	3:57
7.	"Coffee Makes Me Poo"	Southern; Forbes; DJ Lubel	Forbes	2:32
8.	"Guys They Just Wanna Bang You"	Southern; Forbes; Alex Tenner	Tenner	2:57
9.	"Welcome to Hollywood"	Southern	Forbes	3:17
10.	"Wrong Hole (The Untold Story)"	Southern; Forbes	Forbes	3:04
11.	"Keep It In Your Pants"	Southern; Forbes	Forbes	3:04
12.	"Shave Your Ballsack"	Southern; Forbes	Forbes	1:43
13.	"Single Girls"	Southern; Forbes; Lange	Lange	3:03
Total length:				38:11
