= Prom Queen: Summer Heat =

- Created by: Big Fantastic
- Directed by: Doug Cheney, Chris Hampel, Chris McCaleb, Ryan Wise
- Starring: Alexandra French, Sean Hankinson, Katy Stoll, David Loren, Jake Shideler, Angela Arimento
- Country of origin: United States
- No. of episodes: 15

Production
- Producer: Vuguru
- Running time: About 2 minutes

Original release
- Network: MySpace; YouTube; Veoh; Lockerz
- Release: August 27, 2007 – present

Related
- SamHas7Friends

Prom Queen: Summer Heat is the mini-series spinoff of the web series Prom Queen. Like Prom Queen, the show was produced by former Walt Disney CEO Michael Eisner's production company Vuguru and the returning internet series production company Big Fantastic, the creators of SamHas7Friends.

== Plot ==
Following the events of the web-series Prom Queen, the characters venture south to Mexico for a summer vacation, but find themselves unable to escape the mysteries that had haunted their high school lives.

== Cast ==
- Sean Hankinson as Ben
- Katy Stoll as Sadie
- David Loren as Chad
- Laura Howard as Danica
- Alexandra French as Nikki
- Jake Shideler as Josh
- Angela Arimento as Marisol
