= Project My World =

American reality television series

Project My World is a reality television series that was broadcast on American satellite TV channel, The 101 Network, an exclusive service of DirecTV. The ten-part series premiered on October 16, 2006 and was shown on Monday nights.

The show followed three women as they traveled the world meeting up with their friends and unsigned bands, all of whom had accounts on MySpace. The program was produced in various European countries over a 30-day period.

The show's hosts, creators and executive producers are actresses/hosts Renee Intlekofer and Shaina Fewell. Taryn Southern, a friend and another actress, was also part of the cast for the first season, but will not return for an upcoming second season. An online search eventually produced Southern's replacement, Bridgetta Tomarchio.

Project My World traveled to Australia and New Zealand in the second season which premiered on October 1, 2007.

== About the hosts ==
- Intlekofer is a former professional wrestler who has a degree in sociology from UCLA; she is originally from Oregon.
- Fewell grew up on a farm in Indiana and is a music video director.
- Bridgetta Tomarchio is originally from Baltimore, Maryland and has been a backup dancer and snake handler. She has performed at some Britney Spears concerts.

== Cities visited 2006 ==
- Valencia, Spain
- Barcelona, Spain
- Saint-Tropez, France
- Munich, Germany
- Verona, Italy
- Venice, Italy
- Split, Croatia
- Paris, France
- Ramstein, Germany
- London, England

== Cities visited 2007 ==
- Auckland, New Zealand
- Christchurch, New Zealand
- Queenstown, New Zealand
- Sydney, Australia
- Jindabyne, Australia
- Hanging Rock, Australia
- Melbourne, Australia
- Brisbane, Australia
- Cairns, Australia

== Performing bands 2007 ==
- Dead inside the chrysalis
- Midnight Youth
- The Dukes
- Sunburn
- Pluto
- Elias
- Super-Ok!
- MC Lesson
- Angelas Dish
- Kanvas Grey
- Dead Day Sun
- Skybombers

== Events and activities on the show ==
- Tomatillo Festival (Spain)
- Hot air balloon Riding (Spain)
- Oktoberfest (Germany)
- Indoor skydiving (England)
- Rappelling (Germany)

== Events and activities on the show ==
- Zorbing
- Bungee jumping
- Winterfest/Queenstown, NZ
- Skydiving Great Barrier Reef
- V8 car racing
- dirt bikes
