= Guest House (2020 film) =

2020 film directed by Sam Macaroni

- Theatrical release poster
- Directed by: Sam Macaroni
- Written by: Sam Macaroni; Sean Bishop; Troy Duffy
- Produced by: Tara L. Craig; Scott Clayton; Sam Macaroni
- Starring: Pauly Shore; Mike Castle; Aimeé Teegarden; Billy Zane; Steve-O; Charlotte McKinney; Mikaela Hoover
- Cinematography: Thor Wixom
- Edited by: Laurence Cohen; Miles Barken
- Music by: Tim Montijo
- Production companies: Ego System; Squid Farm
- Distributed by: Lionsgate
- Release date: September 4, 2020
- Running time: 84 minutes
- Country: United States
- Language: English

Guest House is a 2020 American comedy film co-written and directed by Sam Macaroni.

The film stars Pauly Shore, Mike Castle, Aimeé Teegarden, Billy Zane, Steve-O, Charlotte McKinney and Mikaela Hoover. The film released on digital and on-demand platforms on September 4, 2020.

== Plot ==
Three years after getting in trouble for drug use in college, Blake Renner and his girlfriend, Sarah Masters, move into a house with an excellent backyard and a guest house; however, the realtor reveals that there is one catch: a drug-addict-turned-squatter named Randy Cockfield who is living in the guest house collecting drugs and priceless artifacts. Blake works at a Skateboard shop run by Shred, while Sarah works as a school teacher. After two months, Randy is still there. He finds a wild possum and captures it. Blake and Randy talk to each other and smoke Cannabis. Sarah is annoyed by the issues and her father, Douglas Masters, does not approve of her relationship with Blake. Blake proposes to Sarah and she accepts, despite her father’s disapproval.

Six months later, Randy is still there and Blake and Sarah are fed up. Randy organizes an orgy, and when Blake tries to stop them he is drugged and destroys a gazebo shooting fireworks into the sky. Following the incident, Blake is arrested by corrupt cops, who are friends of Randy. A turf war starts between Randy and Blake. Blake assaults Randy and is arrested and bailed out again. The corrupt cops allow Randy to get a restraining order from Blake. Randy sneaks into the couple's house and injects MDMA in their water bottles, altering their behavior and resulting in uncontrolled sexual activity which results in Blake getting fired. With more time on his hands, Blake hires a crew to bug-bomb the guest house, causing Randy to have to escape for medical reasons. With Randy gone, Blake and Sarah organize a quiet dinner in the backyard. Randy returns and releases a drug-addicted possum with rabies on them, and the group are bitten by the possum, leading to the need of rabies injections. One member ends up in the emergency room due to the severity of the bites.

Blake and Sarah organize their wedding in the backyard and, despite her father's objections, the wedding proceeds and the couple is married. Randy puts MDMA in their drinks, causing the wedding guests to behave abnormally and damage the home. Blake finds Randy hidden in the attic and attempts to beat him to death until Douglas stops him and beats him. Randy and Blake are arrested and Sarah bails Blake out. Sarah also reveals that she's pregnant with Blake's son.

Blake finds a new job and the two are separated until they are asked to return for questioning about the house. They find Randy and make peace, officially ending their turf war. He explains that he repaired the home damages with money made from selling a priceless artifact from his collection which was worth millions. Randy explains that the house was originally owned by his parents and he had been preventing it from being sold because of his childhood memories. Randy shows that he has redesigned the guest house into a room for their baby and that he wants a family to live in the house. Randy leaves, and the two newly-weds move in and start to raise their son in the house. They eventually get a video chat from Randy who is now partying on a yacht. He claims that he and his companions will be coming to the guest house. Blake and Sarah say that they won't allow him to squat in the guest house again.

== Cast ==
- Pauly Shore as Randy Cockfield
- Mike Castle as Blake Renner
- Aimee Teegarden as Sarah Masters
- Billy Zane as Douglas Masters
- Steve-O as Shred
- Preston Lacy as Micky
- Charlotte McKinney as Jenny
- Mikaela Hoover as Taylor
- Alycia Cooper as Edna Hindpoken
- Chris Kattan as Delivery Guy Ricky
- Lou Ferrigno as Sergeant Winters
- Erik Griffin as Officer Ford
- Liz Katz as Carrie
- Bobby Lee as Benny
- Timothy DeLaGhetto as Thadius Baker
- Sam Macaroni as Doctor Mitchell
- Jack Tenney (JoogSquad) as Wake Boarding Man
- Lou Ferrigno Jr. as Kip Werner
- Ed Bassmaster as Sonny Days

== Reception ==
Rotten Tomatoes gives the film a 0% approval rating based on six reviews, with an average rating of 2.1/10. IMDb gives it 4.4 out of 10 based on 2886 reviews
