= Web series =

Episodic short videos released online

A web series, also known as a short-form series or web show, is a sequence of short scripted or unscripted videos, generally in episodic form, released via the Internet. A typical episode of a web series can be anywhere from 3 to 15 minutes long (though some may run up to 20 minutes). (Note: "Today there are more than 60 festivals dedicated to web series around the world, and most of these operate with a requirement for submissions that two or three episodes must have been made, and that episodes run for a maximum of 20 minutes. Some have requirements for episodes to be shorter than 15 minutes.") A single installment of a web series can be called a webisode or an episode.

Web series are distributed on websites and apps, such as YouTube, Vimeo, and TikTok, and can be watched on devices such as smartphones, tablets, desktops, laptops, and Smart TVs (or television sets connected to the Internet with a media streaming device). Major OTT services, such as Netflix and Amazon Prime Video, (Note: Netflix and Amazon Prime Video are available globally, along with other international streaming services.) are also including short-form series in their libraries, either as original or acquired programs. Web series can also be released on social media platforms. Because of the nature of the Internet, they may be interactive and immersive. As a form of new media, web series first emerged in the mid-1990s and became more prominent in the early 2000s.

== How web series differ from similar media formats ==
Although the design of a web series can be similar to that of a television series, the scale of a web series is smaller and its development and production do not entail the same financial investment required for a television series. (Note: Quibi, a mobile app for short-form streaming that partitioned original content and full-length TV series into segments of 10 minutes or less each, attracted talent from prestige television and film studios. The platform shut down six months after it was launched.) The popularity of some web series, however, has led to them being optioned for cable and streaming television.

Web series differ structurally from streaming television series. (Note: Because they are delivered over the Internet, "web series" is the preferred term used in India for streaming television series, regardless of episodes length.) While web series feature shorter episodes, streaming television episodes typically run from 30 to 60 minutes or longer. (Note: In the entertainment industry, episodic television programs with a runtime of 30+ minutes per episode are considered 'long-form series'. This half-hour benchmark represents the structural threshold where a digital series transitions into a premium, full-length TV series intended for television streaming apps.) Although both are accessed through the Internet, streaming television series are designed to be watched on streaming platforms such as Netflix, Amazon Prime Video, or Disney+. OTT services offer original productions made by and for them as well as licensed content acquired with distribution rights. These streaming television services operate as modern counterparts to traditional television networks.

Web series are different from short-form content, such as microdramas, in that the latter are vertical videos specifically designed for smartphone viewing and intended for fast-paced consumption, with runtimes usually ranging from less than one minute to three minutes.

== Recognition ==
=== Festivals ===
There are film festivals for web series, such as Melbourne WebFest (Australia), Seoul Webfest (Note: Formerly known as KWebFest.)(South Korea), Webfest Berlin (Germany), Rio Webfest (Brazil), NYC Web Fest (United States), LA Web Fest (United States), and Vancouver Web Fest (Canada).

In addition to web series festivals, major festivals such as Series Mania (France), Serial Killer (Czech Republic), and Seriencamp (Germany) include dedicated categories for short-form series.

=== Awards ===
Awards organizations have been established to celebrate excellence in web series and major award ceremonies have created digital media and short-form award categories, including the Emmy Awards (US), (Note: The Emmy Awards short-form episode runtime is now from two minutes to 20 minutes) Canadian Screen Awards, and BAFTA Awards (UK). (Note: A strand is "a linked series of programmes, sharing a common title.")

The Webby Awards, established in 1996 by the International Academy of Digital Arts and Sciences (IADAS), and the Indie Series Awards, established in 2009 by We Love Soaps, recognize independently produced comedy, drama, and reality TV entertainment created for the web. In 2009, the International Academy of Web Television (IAWTV) was founded with the mission to support and recognize artistic and technological achievements in the digital entertainment industry. It administered the selection of winners for the Streamy Awards in 2009 and 2010. Due to the poor execution and reception of the 2010 awards show, IAWTV decided to halt its production of the ceremony. This decision led to the formation of the IAWTV Awards in 2012, which recognize creators, cast, and crew of short-form digital series from around the world.

== History ==
=== 1990s ===
In April 1995, "Global Village Idiots", an episode of the reality-based program Rox on public access cable television in Bloomington, Indiana, was uploaded to the Internet, making Rox the first show distributed via the web. The same year, Scott Zakarin created The Spot, an episodic series that integrated photos, videos, and blogs into the storyline. Likened to Melrose Place on the Web, The Spot featured a rotating cast of characters playing trendy twenty-somethings who rented rooms in a fabled Santa Monica, California, beach house called "The Spot". The Spot earned Infoseek's "Cool Site of the Year" award, which later became the Webby.

In January 1999, Showtime licensed the animated sci-fi web series WhirlGirl, making it the first independently produced web series licensed by a national television network. In February 1999, the show premiered simultaneously on Showtime and online. The character occasionally appeared on Showtime, for example, hosting a "Lethal Ladies" programming block, but spent most of her time online, appearing in 100 webisodes.

=== 2000s ===
As broadband access increased in speed and availability, delivering high-quality video over the Internet became a reality. In the early 2000s, the Japanese anime industry began broadcasting original net animation (ONA), a type of original video animation (OVA) series, on the Internet. Early examples of ONA series include Infinite Ryvius: Illusion (2000), Ajimu (2001), and Mahou Yuugi (2001).

In 2000, The Brothers Chaps launched the Adobe Flash-created web series Homestar Runner. After being put on hiatus in 2010, it returned in 2014.

In 2002, Matt Jolly (better known as "Krinkels") released the first episode of Madness Combat on Newgrounds. The show is still ongoing, with the latest episode, "Madness Combat 12: Contravention", released on Twitch in September 2024.

In 2003, Microsoft launched MSN Video, offering NBC-related content. Its web series, Weird TV 2000, a spin-off of the syndicated television series Weird TV, featured dozens of shorts, comedy sketches, and mini-documentaries produced exclusively for MSN Video. The video-sharing site YouTube was launched in early 2005, allowing users to share television programs. YouTube co-founder Jawed Karim said the inspiration for YouTube first came from Janet Jackson's role in the 2004 Super Bowl incident, when her breast was exposed during her performance, and later from the 2004 Indian Ocean tsunami. Karim could not easily find video clips of either event online, which led to the idea of a video-sharing site.

From 2003 to 2006, many independent web series gained significant popularity, most notably the science fiction series Red vs. Blue by Rooster Teeth. The series was distributed independently via the online portals YouTube and Revver, as well as the Rooster Teeth website, acquiring over 100 million social media views during its run. (Rooster Teeth would eventually create the computer-animated web series RWBY in 2013.) In 2004, the adult-animated series Salad Fingers was created and amassed a cult following. The comedy show The Burg, hailed as the Internet's first sitcom and starring Kelli Giddish and Lindsey Broad, rapidly gained an audience and press attention before its creators signed a creation deal with Michael Eisner. The drama Sam Has 7 Friends, which ran in the summer and fall of 2006, was nominated for a Daytime Emmy Award and was temporarily removed from the Internet when it was also acquired by Eisner. In 2004–2005, Spanish producer Pedro Alonso Pablos recorded a series of video interviews featuring actors and directors such as Guillermo del Toro, Santiago Segura, Álex de la Iglesia, and Keanu Reeves, which were distributed through his own website. lonelygirl15, California Heaven, The Burg, and Sam Has 7 Friends also gained popularity during this time, acquiring audiences in the millions. (Science fiction thriller lonelygirl15 was so successful that it secured a sponsorship deal with Neutrogena in 2007.)

In 2004, Stewart St. John, executive producer and head writer of the 1990s web series The Spot, revived the brand for online audiences as The Spot (2.0), with a new cast, and as a separate soap opera on Sprint PCS Vision-enabled cell phones, creating the first American mobile phone series. St. John and partner Todd Fisher produced over 2,500 daily videos of the mobile soap, driving storylines across platforms to its web counterpart.

In 2007, the creators of lonelygirl15 followed up on the show's success with KateModern, a comedy-drama series that debuted on the social network Bebo and took place in the same fictional universe as their previous show. Big Fantastic created and produced the soap opera Prom Queen, financed and distributed by Michael Eisner's production firm Vuguru, and debuted the series on MySpace. Vuguru partnered with Mark Cuban's channel HDNet to release All-for-nots, a mockumentary series by The Burg creators Kathleen Grace and Thom Woodley, which debuted at the SXSW Festival in 2008. These web series highlighted interactivity with the audience in addition to the narrative on relatively low budgets. In contrast, the eight-episode show Sanctuary, starring actor/producer Amanda Tapping, cost $4.3 million to produce. Both Sanctuary and Prom Queen were nominated for a Daytime Emmy Award. Award-winning producer/director Marshall Herskovitz created the drama Quarterlife, which debuted on MySpace and was later distributed on NBC.

In 2008, major television studios began releasing web series, such as the ABC comedy show Squeegies, the NBC sci-fi show Gemini Division, and the Bravo reality series The Malan Show. Warner Bros. relaunched The WB as an online network beginning with the original mystery web series Sorority Forever, created and produced by Big Fantastic and executive produced by McG. Meanwhile, MTV announced a new original web series created by Craig Brewer, $5 Cover, that brought together the indie music world and new media expansion. Joss Whedon created, produced, and self-financed the musical comedy-drama Dr. Horrible's Sing-Along Blog, starring Neil Patrick Harris and Felicia Day. Big Fantastic wrote and produced Foreign Body, a mystery web series that served as a prequel to Robin Cook's novel of the same name. Beckett and Goodfried founded a new Internet studio, EQAL, and produced a spin-off of lonelygirl15 titled LG15: The Resistance.

The mainstream press began to provide coverage. In the United Kingdom, KateModern ended its run on Bebo. Bebo also hosted a six-month-long reality travel show, The Gap Year, produced by Endemol UK, and produced an interactive sci-fi drama Kirill for MSN.

During MIPCOM in October 2008, MySpace announced plans for a second series and indicated that it was in talks with Australian cable network Foxtel to distribute its first series on network television. Additionally, MySpace announced plans to produce versions of the MySpace Road Tour reality series in other countries. The emerging potential for success in web video caught the attention of top entertainment executives in America, including former Disney executive Michael Eisner, then head of the Tornante Company. Tornante's Vuguru subdivision partnered with Canadian media conglomerate Rogers Media on October 26, securing plans to produce upwards of 30 new web shows a year. Rogers Media agreed to help fund and distribute Vuguru's upcoming productions, thereby solidifying a connection between old and new media. Web series could be distributed directly from the producers' websites, through streaming services, or via online video sharing websites.

In 2009, the first web series festival was established, named the Los Angeles Web Series Festival.

=== 2010s ===
In January 2010, the first episode of the independent animation web series Battle for Dream Island was released on YouTube. Created by twin brothers Cary and Michael Huang, it is the first in a category of game show genre parodies featuring anthropomorphic objects, a genre later called "object shows".

During the 2010s, YouTube established itself as the leading distributor of self-produced web series. In October 2015, YouTube unveiled YouTube Red (now known as YouTube Premium), a subscription service which, alongside ad-free streaming, offered an exclusive catalog of web series later known as YouTube Originals (the original content program was shut down in January 2022).

In May 2017, Kevin and Luke Lerdwichagul, creators of the YouTube parody channel and sketch comedy machinima web series SMG4, launched the animation studio Glitchy Boy, later renamed Glitch Productions, to focus on original web shows, with the first, titled Meta Runner, being released in 2019.

== See also ==
- British Academy Television Award for Best Short Form
- International Emmy Award for Best Short-Form Series
- Web anime
- Webnovela
- Webtoon
- Digital content
- Podcast
- Tubefilter
- Channel 101
- Shorty Awards
