= SamHas7Friends =

- SamHas7Friends logo
- Created by: Douglas Cheney; Chris Hampel; Chris McCaleb; Ryan Wise; Marqus Blakely
- Directed by: Douglas Cheney; Chris Hampel; Chris McCaleb; Ryan Wise
- Starring: Stephanie Marquis
- Country of origin: United States
- No. of episodes: 80

Production
- Producer: Marqus Blakely
- Running time: 90 seconds

Original release
- Network: YouTube; Revver iTunes
- Release: August 28 – December 15, 2006

Related
- Prom Queen

Sam Has 7 Friends is a 2006 drama web series created, produced, and funded by the production company Big Fantastic and subsequently bought and distributed by the studio Vuguru. The series appeared on YouTube, Revver, iTunes and its own web site. The show revolves around its tagline, "Samantha Breslow has seven friends. On December 15, 2006, one of them will kill her," with each episode bringing Sam one day closer to her death.

== History ==
The series was created as an experiment by a group of young Los Angeles-based filmmakers – Douglas Cheney, Chris Hampel, Chris McCaleb, Ryan Wise, and producer Marqus Blakely – in their spare time. The project was on a budget of $50,000. Chris Hampel and Chris McCaleb were also working on Michael Mann's film Miami Vice, with Hampel as Mann's assistant, and McCaleb as an assistant editor.

The group eventually formed a production company called Big Fantastic and set about creating a series of webisodes. The producers believed there was an untapped market for people with short attention spans, or office workers with only sporadic free time, who could watch a short-form, scripted, and highly serialized drama. When the series launched, it was distributed for free on YouTube, Revver, iTunes and its own site, samhas7friends.com. The series was produced with little to no business model, with minimal support from advertising via Revver. Since the site's shutdown, all episodes and related content were moved over to Blip.TV which provided revenue to the producers by pre-roll ads until it eventually closed in 2015.

== Story ==
Sam Has 7 Friends is variously described as a soap opera or murder mystery. The story follows an attractive cast of young actors around LA with the knowledge, throughout the series, that one of them is going to kill Samantha Breslow, an aspiring actress.

The seven "friends" that appear in the series opening credits are Sam's boyfriend Patrick, her ex-boyfriend Willie, her best friend Dani, Dani's boyfriend Chivo, her neighbor Scott, Patrick's other girlfriend Vera, and Sam's agent Roman.

The characters get in various fights with each other over the course of the webseries' 80-episode run. With each webisode only lasting 90 seconds (1 minute and 30 seconds), each episode focuses on the most interesting minute and a half of the characters' days.

Throughout the series, Sam has a bad run of luck, going through two break-ups, struggling to find acting work and getting in fights with her best friend, her agent and her sister. After attempting various reconciliations, she decides she has had her fill of Los Angeles and decides to leave.

On the very final episode, Samantha is murdered while preparing to pack her bags and move out of Los Angeles forever. The killer is never seen and was never revealed in the final episode, leaving the viewers to process the mystery. The answer was eventually slowly revealed within its spin-off series, Prom Queen: The Homecoming.

== Reception ==
Critics had mixed reactions to Sam Has 7 Friends. Virginia Heffernan of the New York Times described the series as "respectably viral." Television critic Andrew Wallenstein was perplexed by the series, and suggested that "maybe drama remains the domain of traditional mediums."

The series received small audiences of several thousand viewers at YouTube, Revver and its own site. At iTunes the show was more popular, receiving more than 10,000 downloads a day through the show's run.

== Aftermath ==
While the show attracted 3 million views during its initial run, Sam Has 7 Friends caught the eye of the United Talent Agency, one of the "Big 5" Hollywood talent agencies, which operates a unit to scout for online talent.

After shopping the series around, United Talent Agency and Big Fantastic caught the eye of Michael Eisner, the former CEO of Walt Disney who was creating a studio to produce content for the internet. Eisner acquired the rights for Season 1 of Sam Has 7 Friends as well as an option to produce any future seasons. Through his new production company, Vuguru, Eisner funded the production of Big Fantastic's second series, Prom Queen. That series debuted on MySpace on April 1, 2007.

In October 2012, both this show and "Prom Queen" were made available for viewing online on The CW's website.
