= Vuguru =

American Multi-platform Studio

- Founded: 2006
- Founder: Michael Eisner
- Headquarters: Beverly Hills, California
- Key people: Larry Tanz, Michael Eisner, David Shall, Kristin Jones
- Parent: The Tornante Company (50%); Rogers Media (50%)
- Website: Homepage

Vuguru is an American independent multi-platform studio founded by Michael Eisner's The Tornante Company in March 2006. The company has produced content including the web series Prom Queen, The Booth at the End, Little Women Big Cars, The All-for-Nots, and Back on Topps. The company has signed content deals with AOL, HDNet, Yahoo!, Hulu, YouTube, Stan Lee's POW! Entertainment, and FremantleMedia. Its shows are distributed in over forty countries, on the Internet, mobile phones, and linear television platforms.

== Corporate overview ==
Vuguru properties are distributed internationally in over forty countries. The company produces web television series for distribution on the Internet, portable media devices, television, and cellphones. The name of the company was developed from the French word "vous" and the English word "guru", and combining the words creates a synthetic term that refers to "you are the guru viewing" according to company founder Michael Eisner. Eisner also stated that the purpose of the firm was to produce "story-driven content for the Internet that up until now could only be found in movie theaters or on television". In October 2009, Vuguru was spun off as a separate LLC with funding from Rogers Communications, one of Canada's largest communications companies.

In November 2010, Vuguru signed an agreement with AOL to produce a minimum of six scripted series over the next year, each a series of roughly 90-minute episodes, for distribution by AOL. Vuguru also signed a distribution and first-look deal with Content Film in 2010 for regions outside of North America. In 2012 Eisner signed a distribution deal with Universal Studios, which he stated is a step towards film development for both Vuguru produced projects and other properties. Vuguru signed an additional content creation pact with Yahoo!, in addition to its deals with Hulu and YouTube. In 2013 FremantleMedia will become the main international distributor for Vuguru, distributing its products outside of the US and Canada.

== Multi-platform content ==
Early Vuguru multi-platform series included SamHas7Friends (which Vuguru acquired in 2007) and Foreign Body, a prequel to the novel by Robin Cook, shot primarily on location in New Delhi, India. In 2010 Vuguru targeted the production of ten to fifteen new series for Internet distribution. In 2011 Vuguru partnered with comic book guru Stan Lee's company POW! Entertainment to produce additional content. New Vuguru web series have included Don't Ask, Don't Tell, Little Women Big Cars, The Millionaire Tour, Nuclear Family, Off Season, Fetching, Crawlspace, and Pretty Tough.

=== Prom Queen ===
Prom Queen Season One logo

The studio's first project, Prom Queen, consisted of 90-second shorts in 80 episodes and was distributed online, beginning in April 2007. The cost of each 90-second episode was approximately $3000. The project was well reviewed online and attracted over twenty millions viewers. The second season was entitled Prom Queen: Summer Heat, and the third season Prom Queen: Homecoming was released on the CW network platforms.

=== The All-for-Nots ===
The Vuguru web series The All-for-Nots was distributed online by HDNet. The show has been described as modern version of The Monkees or Spinal Tap, as it features a made-for-the-web indie band with the same name as the title of the show. The web series follows the All-for-Nots, a band originating in Williamsburg, Brooklyn, on a fictional national tour across the US. It was released in 24 seven-minute episodes, in addition to 30 shorter web clips that provide background on the band and its members. The show was nominated for three Streamy Awards in 2009, including Best Cinematography in a Web Series, Best Original Music in a Web Series, and Best Ad Integration in a Web Series, which it lost to fellow Vuguru web series Back on Topps.

=== Back on Topps ===
Back on Topps Season One logo

Vuguru produced two seasons of the sports comedy web series Back on Topps. The show was nominated for a Sports Emmy Award for Outstanding New Approaches in Sports Programming: Short Format in 2009. That year the show also won a 2009 Streamy Award for Best Ad Integration in a Web Series. In 2010 it was the winner of the Streamy Award for Best Branded Entertainment Web Series and nominee for the 2010 Streamy Awards for Best Writing for a Comedy Web Series, Best Ensemble Cast in a Web Series, and Best Guest Star in a Web Series. Eisner's investment company is the owner of the Topps merchandise company, from which the series gets its name. The comedy was played on FoxSports.com, and was described in its first season as a seventeen episode mockumentary.

=== The Booth at the End ===
The Booth at the End, a psychological thriller in 23-minute installments, made its debut in 2010 in Canada on the website of CityTV. The content is also available in 62 separate two-minute online episodes, and on FX. The Guardian said of the quality of the series that, "There is more talent and effort poured into one 120-second nugget, demanding a corresponding surge in effort and engagement from the viewer, than there is in almost any hour of TV elsewhere that you care to name." The show centers around individuals who encounter a man named Xander Berkeley. Berkeley sits in a diner booth silently looking out the window, waiting for a stranger to approach him with friendly banter. When they do, their journey begins. Tasks have included the robbing of a bank for exactly $101,043 in exchange for beauty or setting off a bomb in a cafe in order for a woman's husband to be cured of Alzheimer's.

== Executives ==
The chairman and founder of Vuguru is Michael Eisner. In 2009 Vuguru hired Larry Tanz as the company's first President, after having previously served as president and chief executive officer of LivePlanet. They also hired David Shall as their head of business operations, now COO, who was formerly a business affairs executive at Fox. In 2010 the company hired Kristin Jones as its Chief Creative Officer, a former senior vice-president of production, international development, and acquisitions with Miramax. Jones left Vuguru in August, 2013. Tanz was promoted to CEO in February 2012. Eisner stated of Tanz that, "Under his leadership, the company has expanded its production slate, created valuable partnerships and increased profitability."
