= Prom Queen (web series) =

- Created by: Big Fantastic (Doug Cheney, Chris Hampel, Chris McCaleb, Ryan Wise)
- Directed by: Doug Cheney, Chris Hampel, Chris McCaleb, Ryan Wise
- Country of origin: United States
- No. of episodes: 80

Production
- Producer: Vuguru
- Running time: 90 seconds

Original release
- Network: MySpace; YouTube; Veoh
- Release: April 1, 2007 – present

Related
- SamHas7Friends

Prom Queen is the first web series produced by former Walt Disney CEO Michael Eisner's new production company Vuguru and veteran production company Big Fantastic, the creators of Sam Has 7 Friends. The series, consisting of 80 episodes of 90 seconds each, is one of the best-funded entrants into the world of original programming designed exclusively for online video.

The show generated revenue through sponsorships, by selling some of the clothing worn by the characters, and by carrying advertising for Hairspray.

The series premiered April 1, 2007, on MySpace, and supplemental scenes can be seen on MySpace as each of the characters has a MySpace page that includes blogs, Vlogs, and comments between the characters. According to the Financial Times, it marks MySpace's boldest push into original video content. The series was also distributed on YouTube, Veoh, and on an original Prom Queen website.

The first season ended on June 20, 2007, with over 15 million views of the episodes during the original 12-week run, and has been viewed by over 40 million people to date.

A 15-episode spinoff series, Prom Queen: Summer Heat, debuted on August 27, 2007. On May 7, 2008, a Japanese remake of the series, titled Tokyo Prom Queen, began airing in a similar format.

On October 20, 2008, Michael Eisner confirmed that a third season of "Prom Queen" would be produced.

A DVD of the series was released on October 8, 2008; it included behind-the-scenes footage and audio commentaries from the cast and creators of the series.

In July 2009 it was announced that a follow-up series was being filmed, entitled Prom Queen: The Homecoming. Starting July 4, 2010, 'Homecoming' began to air on Citytv, a Canada-based television website. Four episodes were released each Monday. "Homecoming" connected 'Sam Has 7 friends' with 'Prom Queen' and primarily focused on the character, Sadie Simmons. 'Homecoming' ended with a cliffhanger, suggesting another season would appear.

In October 2012, "Homecoming" debuted in the United States (along with the original "Prom Queen" and "Sam Has 7 Friends") on The CW's website.

As of November 2014, the first season can be seen for free on YouTube, at the channel promqueentv. The episodes contain their original edits, without being pasted together as they had been on THE CW website.

On April 13, 2019, actor Sean Hankinson posted a video to Instagram portraying his character, Ben. The video appeared to be simply for fun, not some kind of announcement.

== Plot ==
The core plot of Prom Queen revolves around a text message sent to Ben, saying, "U R going 2 kill the prom queen." This occurs as the prom approaches, and the drama begins to unfold.

== Main characters ==
- Ben - the witty student who receives a cryptic message.
- Sadie - Ben's quiet sister, who writes for the school newspaper. She says she hates the idea of prom, but secretly wants to attend.
- Chad - the school jock, who carries a pink phone that receives a call from one person only. Who could it be?
- Nikki - Chad's girlfriend. She's stuck-up and wants to be the prom queen. However, she has a terrible self-image and has a secret.
- Lauren - Nikki's friend who has a bad relationship with her mother. She loves Josh, but does he love her?
- Curtis - Sadie's quirky best friend with possible other agendas.
- Jill - Lauren's mother, who was Prom Queen at her prom. Jill is mentally unhealthy and seems to be obsessed with Ben.
- Danica - a British exchange student, staying with Lauren; she has a video camera which she uses daily, to capture her American experience.
- Courtney - the girl whom Ben likes. They are doing a school play together, but it seems she has a second life, of sorts.
- Josh - Ben's friend, who keeps to himself and is even a mystery to Ben.

== Cast ==
- Sean Hankinson - Ben
- Katy Stoll - Sadie
- David Loren - Chad
- Laura Howard - Danica
- Alexandra French - Nikki
- Jake Shideler - Josh
- Haley Mancini - Lauren
- John Shires - Nolan
- Mills Allison - Curtis
- Andre Boyer - Brett
- Sheila Vand - Courtney
- Kateland Carr - Michele
- Amy Kay Raymond - Jill

== Music ==
James McKeever wrote the musical score for the series.
